= List of rivers of Georgia (country) =

Map of Georgia

The rivers of Georgia, a country in the Caucasus, are part of either the Black Sea or Caspian Sea Drainage basins. The most spectacular rivers include the Alazani (longest river flowing through Georgia and Azerbaijan), Aragvi, Enguri (second longest river within Georgia), Kura (Mtkvari), and Rioni (longest river in Georgia).

Georgia has about 25,000 rivers, many of which power small hydroelectric stations. Drainage is into the Black Sea to the west and through Azerbaijan to the Caspian Sea to the east. The largest river is the Kura River, which flows 1,364 km from northeast Turkey across the plains of eastern Georgia, through the capital, Tbilisi, and into the Caspian Sea. The Rioni River, the largest river in western Georgia, rises in the Greater Caucasus and empties into the Black Sea at the port of Poti. Soviet engineers turned the river lowlands along the Black Sea coast into prime subtropical agricultural land, embanked and straightened many stretches of river, and built an extensive system of canals. Deep mountain gorges form topographical belts within the Greater Caucasus.

== List of rivers ==
The following table lists significant rivers that flow through Georgia. It shows the total length of the river, the length of the river within Georgia and other countries the river flows through, the size of the river's drainage basin, and the course of the river to the Caspian Sea or Black Sea.

River	Total length	Length within Georgia (Other countries)	Basin size, 1,000	Course
Aapsta	35 km (22 mi)	35 km (22 mi) (de facto Abkhazia)	.243 km^{2} (0.094 sq mi)	Black Sea
Abasha	66 km (41 mi)	66 km (41 mi)	.370 km^{2} (0.143 sq mi)	Black Sea
Acharistsqali	90 km (56 mi)	90 km (56 mi)	1.5 km^{2} (0.58 sq mi)	Black Sea, Chorokhi→
Alazani	409 km (254 mi)	391 km (243 mi) (Azerbaijan)	22.0 km^{2} (8.5 sq mi)	Caspian Sea
Algeti	108 km (67 mi)	108 km (67 mi)	.763 km^{2} (0.295 sq mi)	Caspian Sea
Amtkeli	38 km (24 mi)	38 km (24 mi)	.398 km^{2} (0.154 sq mi)	Black Sea, Kodori→
Andi Koysu	144 km (89 mi)	(Russia)	4.81 km^{2} (1.86 sq mi)	Caspian Sea, Sulak→
Aragvi	110 km (68 mi)	110 km (68 mi)	2.7 km^{2} (1.0 sq mi)	Caspian Sea, Kura→
Argun	148 km (92 mi)	(Russia)	3.39 km^{2} (1.31 sq mi)	Caspian Sea, Sunzha→ Terek→
Assa	133 km (83 mi)	(Russia)	2.06 km^{2} (0.80 sq mi)	Caspian Sea, Sunzha→ Terek→
Bakhvistsqali	42 km (26 mi)	42 km (26 mi)	.156 km^{2} (0.060 sq mi)	Black Sea, Supsa→
Bzyb (Bzipi)	110 km (68 mi)	110 km (68 mi)	1.5 km^{2} (0.58 sq mi)	Black sea
Chanistsqali	63 km (39 mi)	63 km (39 mi)	.315 km^{2} (0.122 sq mi)	Black Sea, Khobi→
Choloki	29.5 km (18.3 mi)	29.5 km (18.3 mi)	.159 km^{2} (0.061 sq mi)	Black Sea, Natenbi→
Çoruh (Chorokhi)	438 km (272 mi)	26 km (16 mi) (Turkey)	22.1 km^{2} (8.5 sq mi)	Black sea
Debed	176 km (109 mi)	(Armenia)	4.08 km^{2} (1.58 sq mi)	Caspian Sea, Khrami→ Kura→
Dzirula	83 km (52 mi)	83 km (52 mi)	1.27 km^{2} (0.49 sq mi)	Black Sea, Qvirila→ Rioni→
Enguri	206 km (128 mi)	206 km (128 mi)	4.1 km^{2} (1.6 sq mi)	Black sea
Ghalidzga	53 km (33 mi)	53 km (33 mi) (de facto Abkhazia)	.483 km^{2} (0.186 sq mi)	Black Sea
Great Liakhvi	115 km (71 mi)	115 km (71 mi)	2.311 km^{2} (0.892 sq mi)	Caspian Sea, Kura→
Gumista River	12 km (7.5 mi)	12 km (7.5 mi) (de facto Abkhazia)	.576 km^{2} (0.222 sq mi)	Black Sea
Iori	320 km (200 mi)	183 km (114 mi) (Azerbaijan)	4.7 km^{2} (1.8 sq mi)	Caspian Sea
Kelasuri	42 km (26 mi)	42 km (26 mi) (de facto Abkhazia)	.22 km^{2} (0.085 sq mi)	Black Sea
Khanistsqali	57 km (35 mi)	57 km (35 mi)	.914 km^{2} (0.353 sq mi)	Black Sea, Rioni→
Khipsta	33 km (21 mi)	33 km (21 mi)	0 km^{2} (0 sq mi)	Black Sea
Khobi	150 km (93 mi)	150 km (93 mi)	1.34 km^{2} (0.52 sq mi)	Black Sea
Khrami	220 km (140 mi)	187 km (116 mi) (Azerbaijan)	8.3 km^{2} (3.2 sq mi)	Caspian Sea
Kintrishi	45 km (28 mi)	45 km (28 mi)	.291 km^{2} (0.112 sq mi)	Black Sea
Kodori	110 km (68 mi)	110 km (68 mi)	2.0 km^{2} (0.77 sq mi)	Black sea
Korolistskali	29.5 km (18.3 mi)	29.5 km (18.3 mi)	.159 km^{2} (0.061 sq mi)	Black Sea
Ksani	84 km (52 mi)	84 km (52 mi)	.885 km^{2} (0.342 sq mi)	Caspian Sea, Kura→
Kura (Mtkvari)	1,515 km (941 mi)	351 km (218 mi) (Turkey, Azerbaijan)	21.1 km^{2} (8.1 sq mi)	Caspian Sea
Kvabliani	41 km (25 mi)	41 km (25 mi)	.9 km^{2} (0.35 sq mi)	Caspian Sea
Little Liakhvi	63 km (39 mi)	63 km (39 mi)	.513 km^{2} (0.198 sq mi)	Caspian Sea, Great Liakhvi→ Kura→
Lopota	33 km (21 mi)	33 km (21 mi)	.263 km^{2} (0.102 sq mi)	Caspian Sea, Alazani→ Kura→
Machakhelistsqali	37 km (23 mi)	(Turkey)	369 km^{2} (142 sq mi)	Black Sea, Çoruh→
Mashavera	66 km (41 mi)	66 km (41 mi)	1.39 km^{2} (0.54 sq mi)	Caspian Sea, Khrami→ Kura→
Mokvi	47 km (29 mi)	47 km (29 mi)	.336 km^{2} (0.130 sq mi)	Black Sea
Mulkhra	27 km (17 mi)	27 km (17 mi)	.435 km^{2} (0.168 sq mi)	Black Sea, Enguri→
Natanebi	60 km (37 mi)	60 km (37 mi)	.657 km^{2} (0.254 sq mi)	Black Sea
Ochkhamuri	21.4 km (13.3 mi)	21.4 km (13.3 mi)	.0652 km^{2} (0.0252 sq mi)	Black Sea, Choloki→ Natanebi→
Paravani	74 km (46 mi)	74 km (46 mi)	2.35 km^{2} (0.91 sq mi)	Caspian Sea, Kura→
Pkhista	13 km (8.1 mi)	13 km (8.1 mi) (de facto Abkhazia)		Black Sea, Pkhista→ Psou→
Psou	57 km (35 mi)	57 km (35 mi) (de facto Abkhazia, along Russian Border)	.420 km^{2} (0.162 sq mi)	Black Sea
Qvirila (Kvrilia)	152 km (94 mi)	152 km (94 mi)	3.6 km^{2} (1.4 sq mi)	Black Sea, Rioni River→
Rioni	333 km (207 mi)	333 km (207 mi)	13.4 km^{2} (5.2 sq mi)	Black Sea
Supsa	117 km (73 mi)	117 km (73 mi)	1.1 km^{2} (0.42 sq mi)	Black Sea
Suramula	42 km (26 mi)	42 km (26 mi)	.719 km^{2} (0.278 sq mi)	Caspian Sea, Ptsa→ Kura→
Tedzami	51 km (32 mi)	51 km (32 mi)	.404 km^{2} (0.156 sq mi)	Caspian Sea, Kura→
Tekhuri	101 km (63 mi)	101 km (63 mi)	1.04 km^{2} (0.40 sq mi)	Black Sea, Rioni→
Terek (Tergi)	623 km (387 mi)	(Russia)	43.2 km^{2} (16.7 sq mi)	Caspian Sea
Tskhenistsqali	184 km (114 mi)	184 km (114 mi)	2.1 km^{2} (0.81 sq mi)	Black Sea, Rioni River→
Vere	45 km (28 mi)	45 km (28 mi)	.194 km^{2} (0.075 sq mi)	Caspian Sea, Kura→

== Pictures of rivers ==
Spectacular Georgian rivers
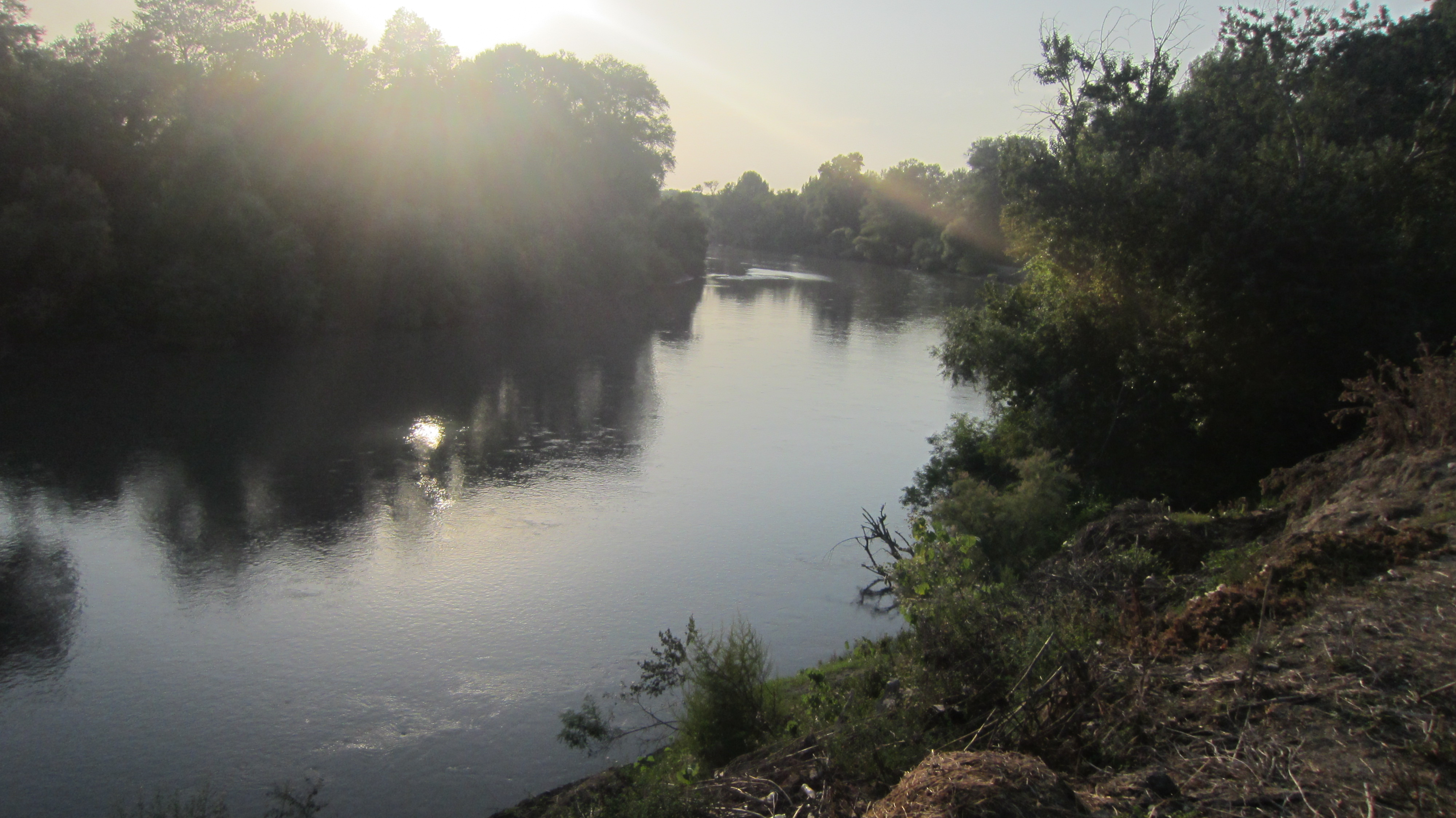
Alazani

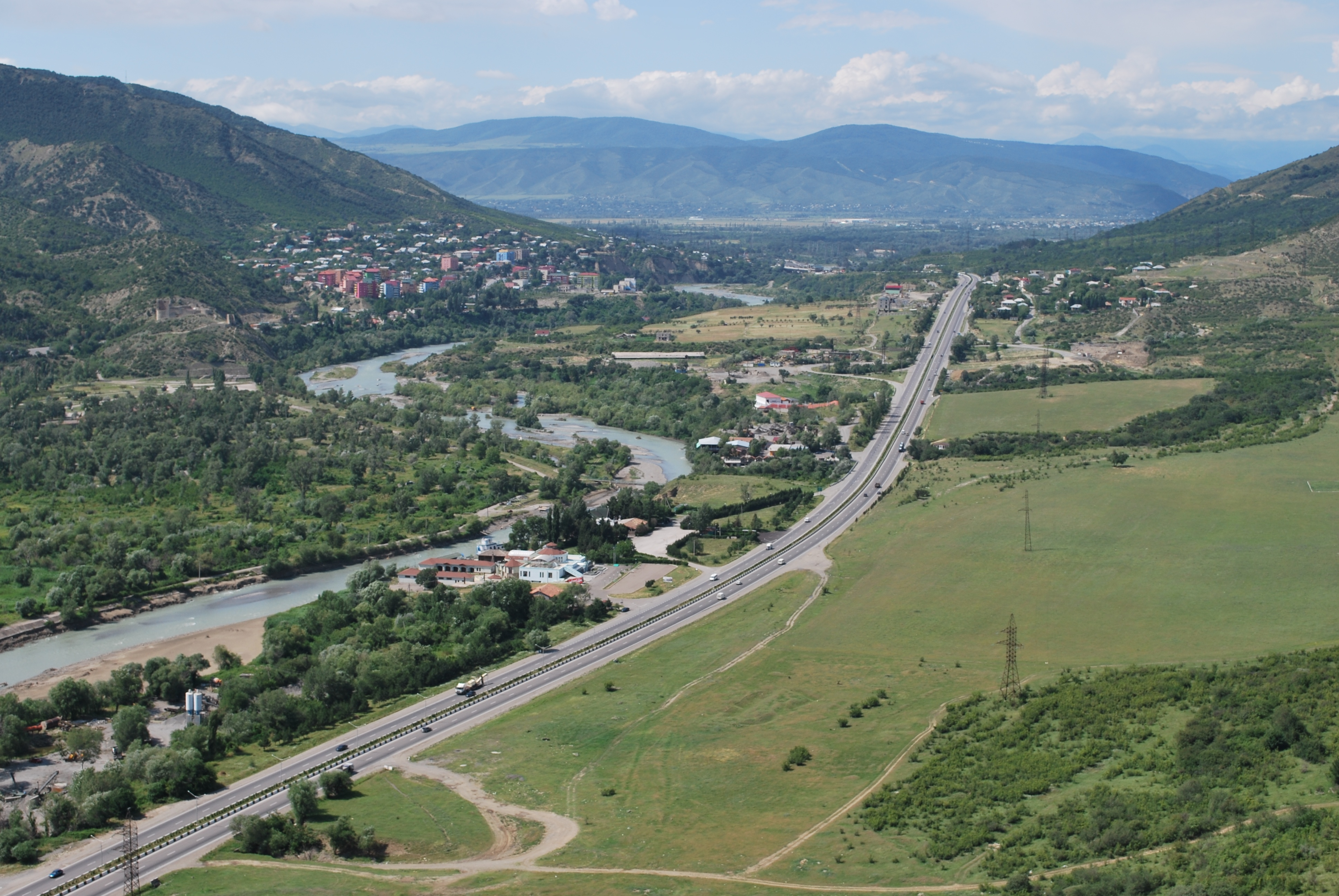
Aragvi River

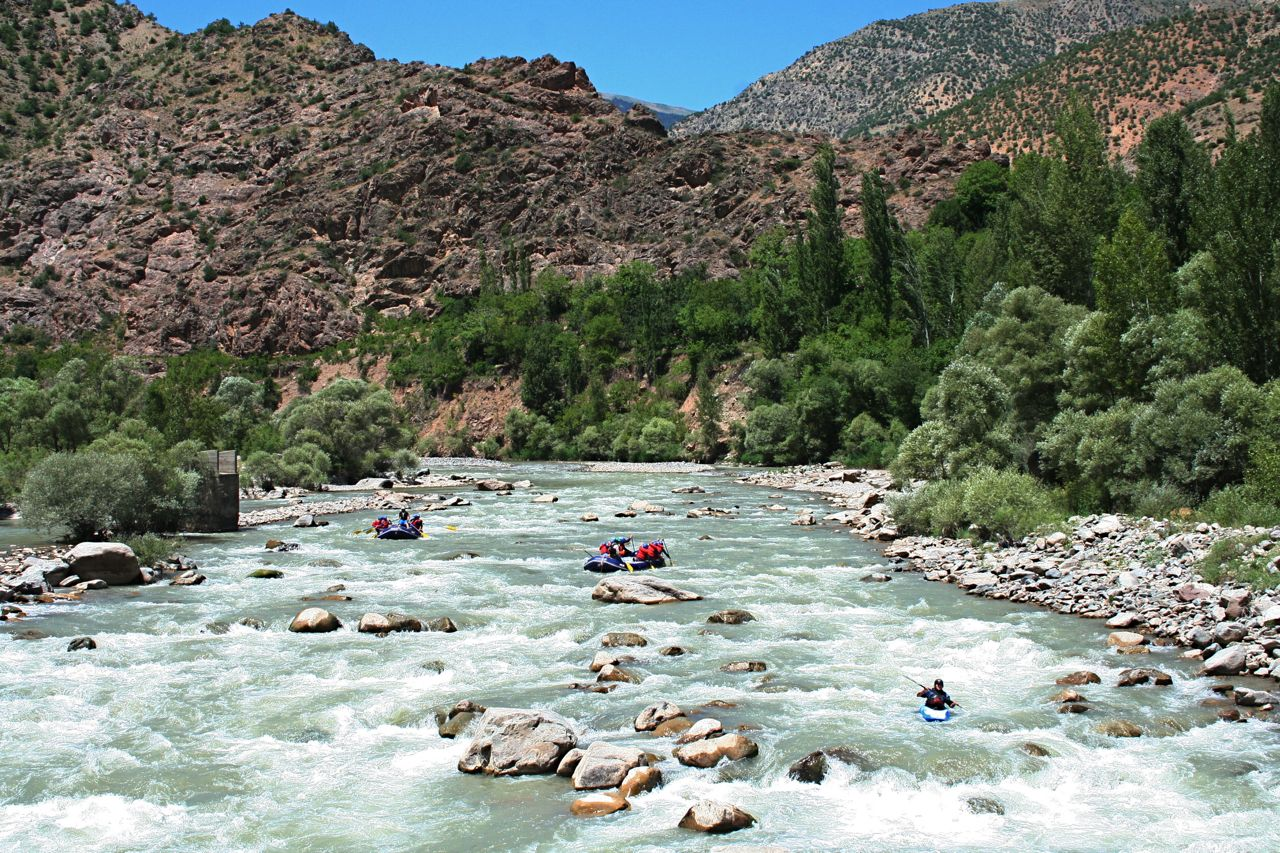
Çoruh River

Enguri River

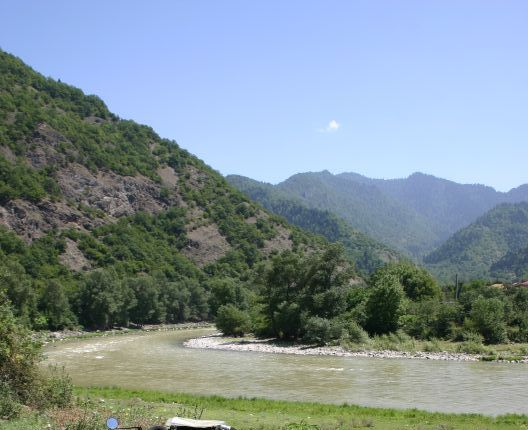
Kura River

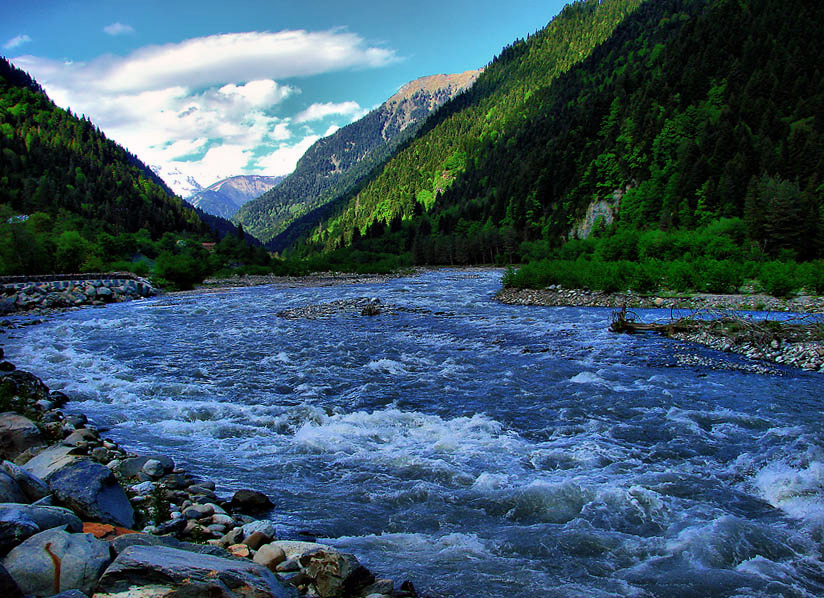
Rioni River
