= Abkhaz Range =

Mountain range in Abkhazia

Abkhazian ridge
- Georgian: აფხაზეთის ქედი Abkhaz: Aҧsnytәi ashkhaӡқua
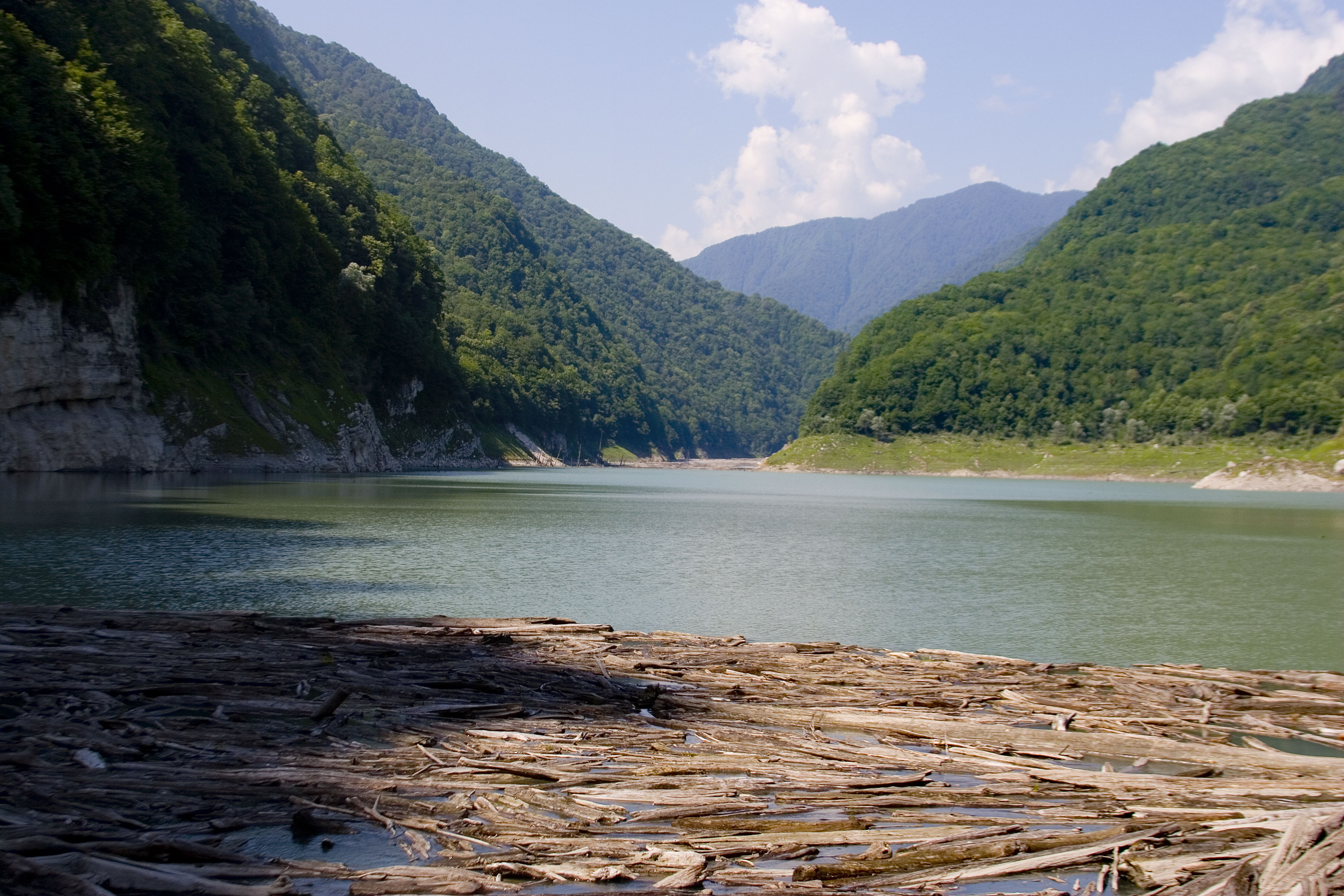
- Lake Amtkeli

Highest point
- Peak: Shkhapizga
- Elevation: 3,026 m (9,928 ft)
- Prominence: 1,145 m (3,757 ft)
- Listing: Ribu

Dimensions
- Length: 60 km (37 mi)

Geography
- Location within Abkhazia Location within Georgia
- Country: Abkhazia (Note: The political status of Abkhazia is disputed. Having unilaterally declared independence from Georgia in 1992, Abkhazia is formally recognised as an independent state by 4 UN member states (three other states previously recognised it but then withdrew their recognition), while the remainder of the international community recognizes it as de jure Georgian territory. Georgia continues to claim the area as its own territory, designating it as Russian-occupied territory.)
- Range coordinates: 43°13′37″N 41°23′23″E
- Parent range: Western Caucasus

Abkhaz Ridge or Chkhalta Ridge (Georgian: აფხაზეთის ქედი, apkhazetis kedi; Abkhaz: Aҧsnytәi ashkhaӡқua, Apsnytvi ridge) — mountain range in Abkhazia, on the southern slopes of Greater Caucasus. Ridge provides drainage divide between the Chkhalta River drainage basin and basins of the Amtkeli, Jambali, Kuabchari and Zimi rivers.

== Geography ==
The ridge serves as an eastern continuation of the Bzyb Range, from which it is separated by a low cofferdam pass Amtkeli, in the area of which the river Kelasuri begins, the valley of which separates southern spurs of two ridges. It stretches in accordance with the direction of folding parallel to the Main Caucasian (Dividing) ridge, from which it is separated by the upper reaches of the Bzyb River and the valley Chkhalta River.

The length of the ridge is about 60 km, the height is up to 3026 m. Notable mountain peaks: Shkhapidzga (3026 m), Shoudyd (2638 m), Atsgara (2670 m), Zurgia (2295 m) and others. A ridge with sharp mountain glacial forms (traces of significant ancient glaciation), modern glaciation is insignificant: three cirque glaciers with a total area of no more than 1 km^{2}. The gentle southern slopes are cut by deep canyon rivers Amtkeli and Jampali, as well as their tributaries. In the middle part of the northern slope, there are several high-mountainous lakes belonging to the Chkhalta basin.

The mountains consist of porphyry from the Jura and mica schist. The slopes are covered with spruce - fir and beech oval forests, in the ridge part there are mountain meadows. Karst new phenomena are widespread: underground rivers, caves, wells.

== See also ==
- Bzyb Range
- Gagra Range
