= Bzyb =

Bzyb, Bzyp, Bzyph or Bziphi may refer to the following entities in Abkhazia, Georgia:

- Bzyb (region), a historical region of Abkhazia
- Bzyb (village)
- Bzyb Abkhaz, a sub-group of the Abkhaz people
- Bzyb dialect, a dialect of the Abkhaz language
- Bzyb Range, a mountain range bounded by the Bzyb river
- Bzyb River, a river in the region
- Church of Bzyb, a church in the Bzyb village
