= Geography of Abkhazia =

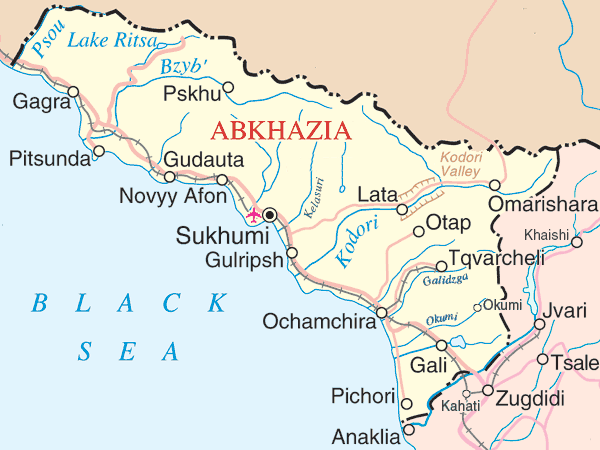
Map of Abkhazia

Abkhazia is a region in South Caucasus. It is a de facto independent republic, but internationally is mostly recognized as part of Georgia.

== Geography ==
Abkhazia covers an area of about 8,660 square kilometres (3,340 sq mi) at the western end of Georgia, on the north shore of the Black Sea. The Caucasus Mountains to the north and the northeast divide Abkhazia from Circassia. To the east, the region is bordered by Svaneti. To the southeast, Abkhazia is bounded by Samegrelo; and on the south and southwest by the Black Sea. The topography is varied as it ranges from the lowlands around the Black Sea to the high peaks in the north.

The region is extremely mountainous (nearly 75% is classified as mountains or foothills) and settlement is largely confined to the coast and a number of deep, well-watered valleys. The Greater Caucasus Mountain Range runs along the region's northern border. The Gagra, Bzyb, and Kodori Ranges branch off from the Main Caucasus Range. The highest peaks of Abkhazia are in the northeast and east (along the border with Svaneti) and several exceed 4,000 meters (13,123 ft) above sea level. The highest mountain is Dombai-Ulgen (4,046 m or 13,274 ft).

== Landscape ==
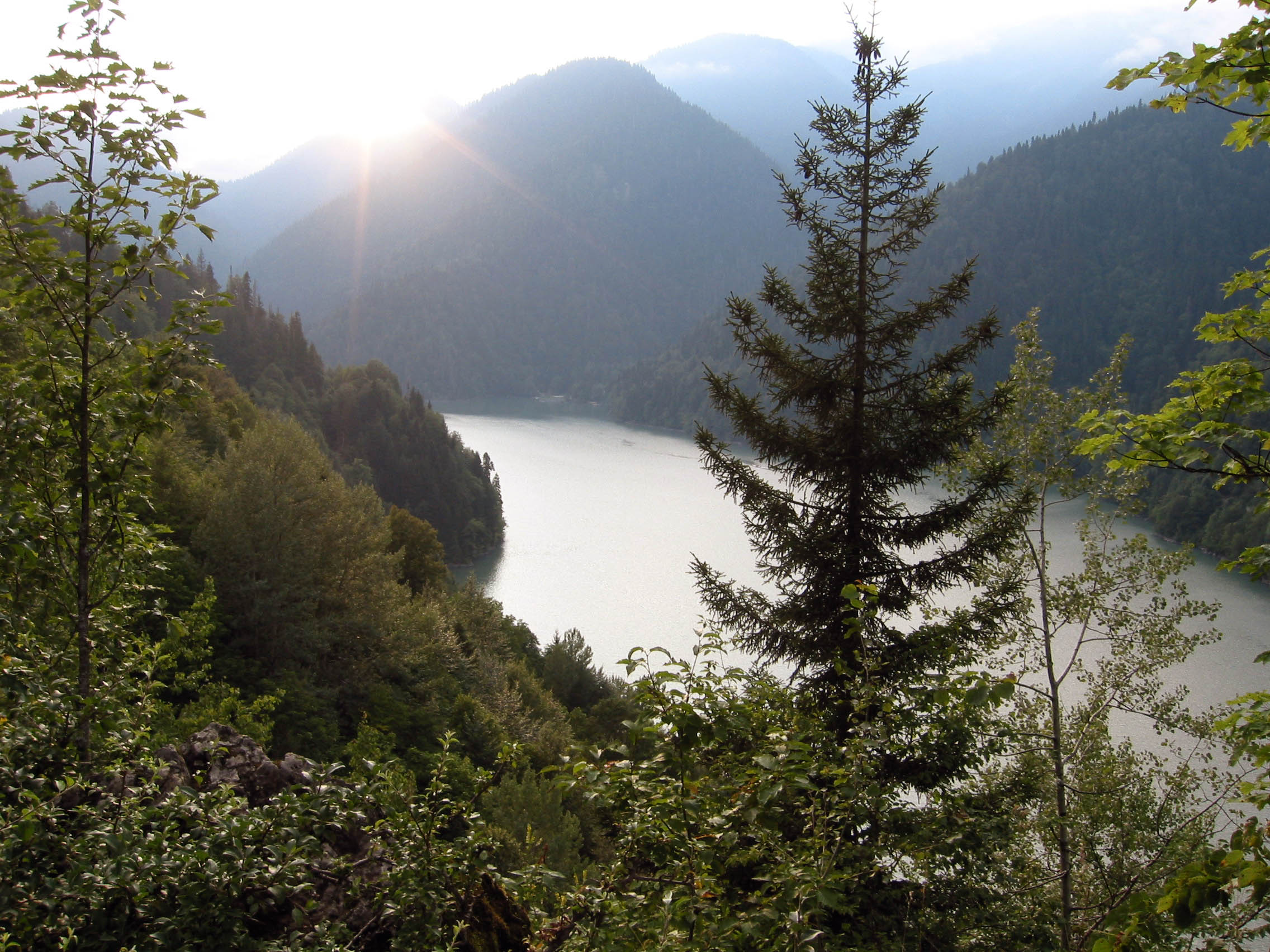
Ritsa lake

The landscapes of Abkhazia range from coastal forests (endemic Pitsunda pine forests near Bichvinta/Pitsunda) and citrus plantations, to eternal snows and glaciers to the north of the republic. Because of Abkhazia's complex topographic setting, most of the territory has been spared from significant human cultivation and development. Therefore, a large portion of Abkhazia (nearly 70% of the territory) is still covered by forests today. Abkhazia is also well known for the high number of endemic species of plants that are found only in the Caucasus, only in Georgia, or only in Abkhazia. The forests of Abkhazia used to be more prevalent and have since been cleared drastically. They consisted of oak, beech, and hornbeam. Southeastern Abkhazia, a part of the Colchis Lowland, is still covered by Colchian forests (alder, hornbeam, oak, beech), or by citrus and tea plantations.

The world's deepest known cave, Krubera (Voronja) Cave, is located in Abkhazia's western Caucasus mountains. The latest survey (as of September 2007) has measured the vertical span of this cave system as 2,191 m (7,188 ft) between its highest and lowest explored points.

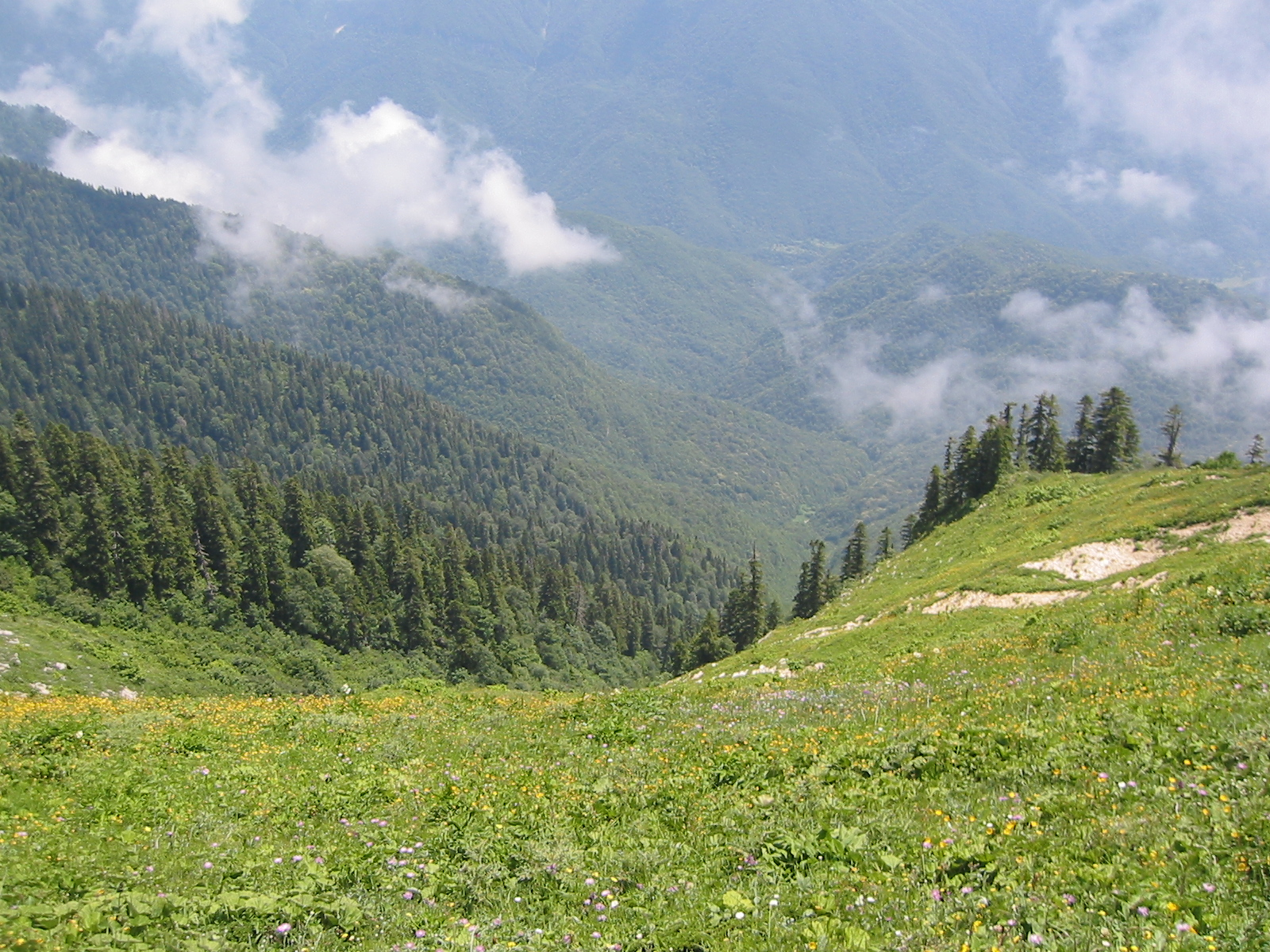
Gagra Range

The foothills, up to an elevation of 600 meters (1,969 ft) above sea level, are covered by deciduous forests (with evergreen elements), and include tree species such as oak, hornbeam, beech, and buxus. The forest covers from 600 to 1,800 meters (1,969 to 5,906 ft) above sea level and is made up of both deciduous and coniferous tree species. The most common species are beech, spruce, and fir. The mixed forest zone is home to some of the tallest trees in Europe and the world, where some specimens of the Nordmann Fir (especially around Lake Ritsa) reach heights of over 70 meters (230 ft). The zone extending 1,800 to 2,900 meters (5,906 to 9,514 ft) above sea level is made up of either subalpine forests or alpine meadows. Territory lying above 2,900 meters (9,514 ft) is mainly covered by eternal snows and glaciers.

== Climate ==
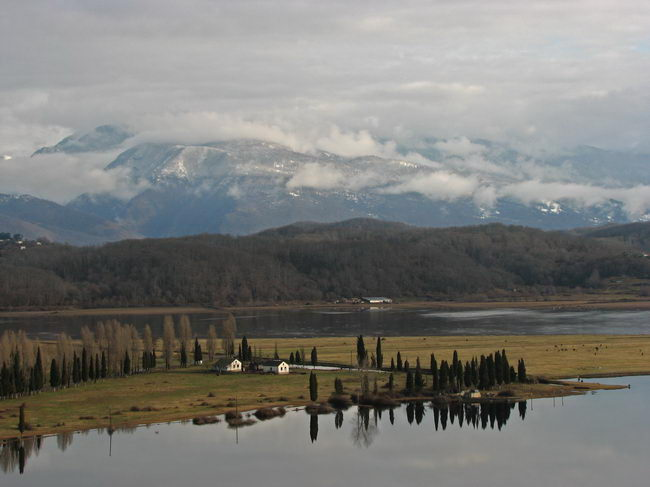
View of the Caucasus mountains from Pitsunda cape

Because of Abkhazia's proximity to the Black Sea, its climate is very mild, considering the northern latitude. The Caucasus Mountains are greatly responsible for moderating the region's climate, as they shield Abkhazia from cold northerly winds.

The coastal areas of the Republic have a subtropical climate, where the average annual temperature in most regions is around 15 °C (59 °F). Average winter (January) temperatures vary between 4 and 6 °C (39.2 and 42.8 °F), while average summer (July) temperatures are anywhere between 22 and 23 °C (71.6 and 73.4 °F). The coastal territory rarely experiences strong frosts during the winter.

Higher elevations of Abkhazia, above 1,000 meters (3,281 ft) above sea level have a maritime, mountain climate, experiencing relatively cold winters and long, warm summers. Elevations above 2,000 meters (6,562 ft) above sea level have colder winters and shorter summers. Abkhazia's highest regions have a cold, summerless climate throughout the year.

Abkhazia receives high amounts of precipitation, but is known for its unique micro-climate (transitional from subtropical to mountain) along most of its coast, causing lower levels of humidity. The annual precipitation along the coast ranges from 1,200 to 1,400 mm (47.2 to 55.1 in). The foothills, the lower ranges, and the interior gorges of the Republic receive anywhere between 1,000 to 1,800 mm (39.4 to 70.9 in) of precipitation annually. Some of the interior gorges that are sheltered from the moist influences of the Black Sea receive the lowest amounts of precipitation. The higher mountainous regions receive 1,700 to 3,500 mm (66.9 to 137.8 in) of precipitation per year. Although there is usually no significant snowfall in the coastal regions, the mountains of Abkhazia do receive significant amounts of snow. Avalanches in the northeast sometimes pose a threat to populated areas. Snow depths often exceed 5 meters (16.4 ft) or 500 cm (196.9 in) in some of the high, mountainous areas facing the Black Sea. The climate is mild, which in the Soviet times caused it to become a popular holiday destination known as the "Georgian Riviera".

Climate data for Sukhumi
Month	Jan	Feb	Mar	Apr	May	Jun	Jul	Aug	Sep	Oct	Nov	Dec	Year
Mean daily maximum °C (°F)	10.0 (50.0)	10.7 (51.3)	12.8 (55.0)	16.8 (62.2)	20.4 (68.7)	24.2 (75.6)	26.5 (79.7)	26.8 (80.2)	24.1 (75.4)	20.3 (68.5)	15.6 (60.1)	12.0 (53.6)	18.3 (65.0)
Mean daily minimum °C (°F)	2.2 (36.0)	2.7 (36.9)	4.5 (40.1)	8.3 (46.9)	12.2 (54.0)	16.2 (61.2)	19.0 (66.2)	18.6 (65.5)	14.8 (58.6)	10.4 (50.7)	6.6 (43.9)	3.9 (39.0)	10.0 (49.9)
Average precipitation mm (inches)	102 (4.0)	76 (3.0)	102 (4.0)	102 (4.0)	92 (3.6)	89 (3.5)	83 (3.3)	107 (4.2)	120 (4.7)	114 (4.5)	104 (4.1)	108 (4.3)	1,199 (47.2)
Average rainy days	17	15	16	15	12	11	10	10	10	12	16	16	160
Source 1: climatebase.ru
Source 2: Georgia Travel Climate Information
