= Sakeni =

Sakeni may refer to one of the following entities:

- Sakeni (village), a village in Georgia
- Sakeni (river), a river in Georgia
- Sakeni Church, an Eastern Orthodox church in Sakeni village, Georgia
