= Otapi =

Otapi Georgian: ოტაფი, Abkhaz: Уатаҧ
- Village and municipality
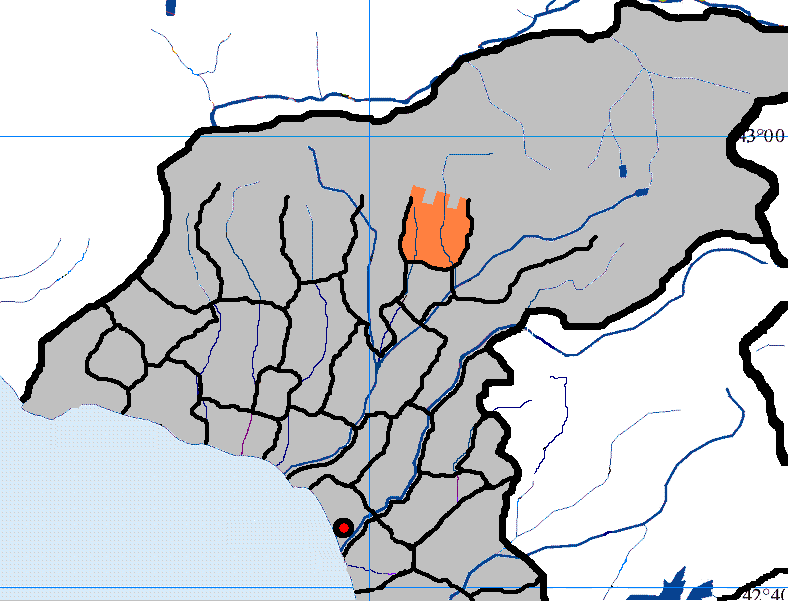
- Municipal location within Ochamchira District (shaded orange)

- Location of Otapi Otapi (Abkhazia)
- Coordinates: 42°55′18″N 41°32′43″E
- Country: Georgia
- Partially recognized independent country: Abkhazia
- District: Ochamchira

Government
  - District head (as of 2010): Murman Dzhopua

Population (2010)
  - Total: Approx. 150
- Time zone: UTC+3 (MSK)
  - Summer (DST): UTC+4

Otapi (Georgian: ოტაფი; Abkhaz: Уатаҧ) is a village and municipality in Ochamchira District, Abkhazia, a partially-recognized state claimed by Georgia. The village lies on the Otapi River. Otapi is noted for its karst cave, Abrskil Cave, which is a tourist attraction in the area.

== Etymology ==
Otapi is also known by several other names such as Atap-Tsarakhmul, Tskar-Khumul, Tskarkhumuli and Tskhar-Khumul.

== Geography ==
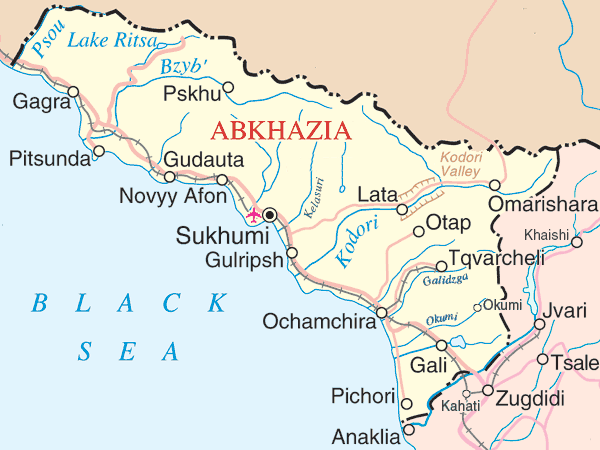

Otapi is in the northwestern part of Georgia and in the central-eastern part of Abkhazia. Within Ochamchira district it is in the central-northern area, to the northwest of Tkvarcheli and to the southeast of Tsebelda (Lata). Populated towns within 5 km (3.1 mi) distance from the Otapi are the Mramba (3.1 km (1.9 mi)), the Akhyvaa (3.7 km (2.3 mi)), the Aymara (4.2 km (2.6 mi)) and the Androu (4.8 km (3.0 mi)).

The town is situated in a very mountainous terrain in the Greater Caucasus at an elevation of 255 metres (837 ft). It experiences snowfall for a considerable duration of the year. The climate is cold and harsh during the winter months.

Mountains in this area of Abkhazia include Mount Achimedzmakh, Eisirkhu (1,237 metres (4,058 ft)), Atvazhukhu (895 metres (2,936 ft)) and Beduk (392 metres (1,286 ft)). Gora Atvazhu-Khu and Gora Beduk are the nearest mountains, which surround the town, within 3 kilometres (1.9 mi) distance. Ablaskira Cave lies at an altitude of 600–700 m (2,000–2,300 ft).

The Otapi River flows through the village and continues south. Mokvi River is another river that flows through this part of Abkhazia. Approximately 20 km (12 mi) to 25 km (16 mi) north of the village is the greater Kodori River, which eventually flows into the Black Sea. Two other small rivers which flow close to the town are the Ulys and the Dzhandzhali-Kvara Rivers.

== Population ==
Before the 1992–1993 Georgian-Abkhaz war, up to 125 families lived in Otapi. The population of the village has declined considerably due to conflict in the region. As of 2010, Otapi contains about 50 houses and buildings.

== Transportation ==
The nearest railroad is Stantsiya, Gupi, which is 11.1 km (6.9 mi) away from the town. The nearest airport is at Sukhumi dranda (SUI) 18 mi (29 km) and Georgia is 41.2 km (25.6 mi) away.

== Abrskila Cave ==
There are two caves of note in the immediate region: Abrskila and Achkityzga.

Abrskil Cave (or "Abrskila") is a notable landmark in the area and it is named after the hero of the Abkhazian national epos, Abrskil. According to Prof. Shalwa Inal-yipa, it is the biggest cave in Caucasia. Characteristics of the cave include interior walls that reach a height of 30–40 meters and this karstic cave reaches a length of about 2 kilometres (1.2 mi), although only 1,500–1,700 metres (4,900–5,600 ft) are accessible to tourists. The Achwats stream flows out of the cave and into the Duab River. The part of the cave which is open to tourists consists of four halls with stalactites and stalagmites. At the cave entrance, tourists can view a waterfall, as well as the Great Abkhazian Wall towers. On June 6, 2010, President Sergey Bagapsh visited the village of Otapi and the Abrskil Cave with MP Zaur Adleiba and the Ochamchira district governor Murman Dzhopua and pledged to provide the assistance needed to restore a tourist route to Abrskil cave. The villagers of Otapi rely heavily on tourists visiting this cave for their livelihoods and selling locally produced farm goods to them. The Abkhaz state-owned company, Chernomorenergo, has been responsible for providing the cave with electricity to light up the tunnels and attract more tourists to fuel the local economy.

Peshchera Achkityzga Cave is situated on the side of a cliff within 1 kilometre (0.62 mi) distance from the town of Otapi.

== See also ==
- Ochamchira District
