= List of rivers of Georgia =

List of rivers of Georgia may refer to:

- List of rivers of Georgia (country), a list of rivers of the country of Georgia
- List of rivers of Georgia (U.S. state), a list of rivers of the American state of Georgia
