= Achibakh Mountain =

Mountain in Abkhazia

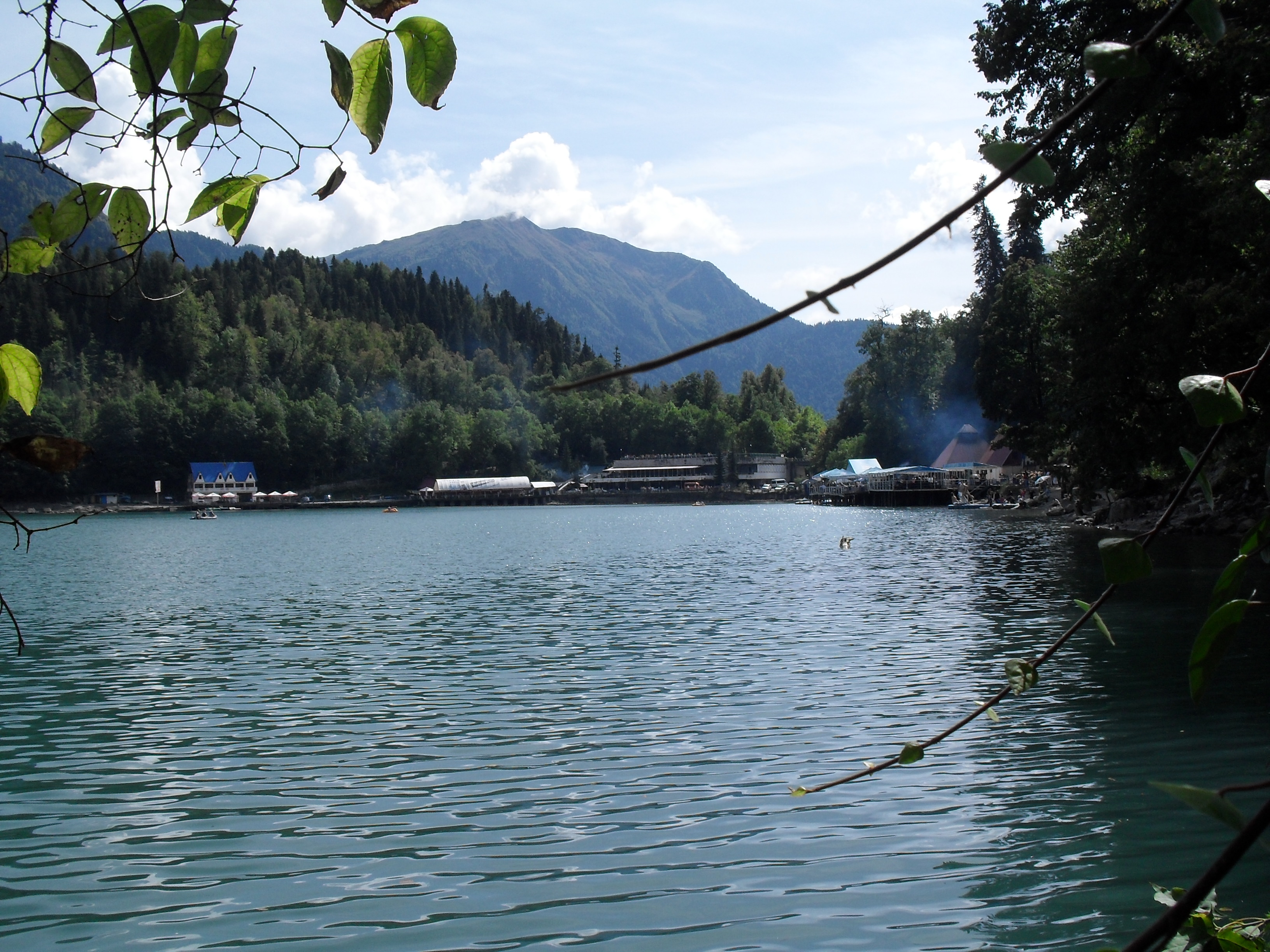
- View of Mount Achibakh from the Lake Ritsa

Highest point
- Elevation: 2,376 m (7,795 ft)
- Coordinates: 43°25′07″N 40°34′57″E

Geography
- Location within Abkhazia Location within Georgia
- Country: Georgia
- Region: Abkhazia
- Parent range: Gagra Range

Achibakh or Achibakhi (Georgian: აჩიბახი) is a mountain in Abkhazia. Height 2376 m. The highest peak of the plateau Rykhva. On the map of Abkhazia, issued in 2009 by the Geographical Society of Abkhazia, the mountain is called Arttara.

== Geography ==
The limestone mountain rises above the karst fields, in which there are many caves. One of the largest caves is the Quartet mine (-340 m).

The highest point in the vicinity is Mount Agepsta northwest of mountain Achibakhi.

== Flora ==
Mixed forest and subalpine (tree line) endemic flora grow on the mountain.

== See also ==
- Achibakh Range
