= Bzyb Range =

Mountain range in Abkhazia, Georgia

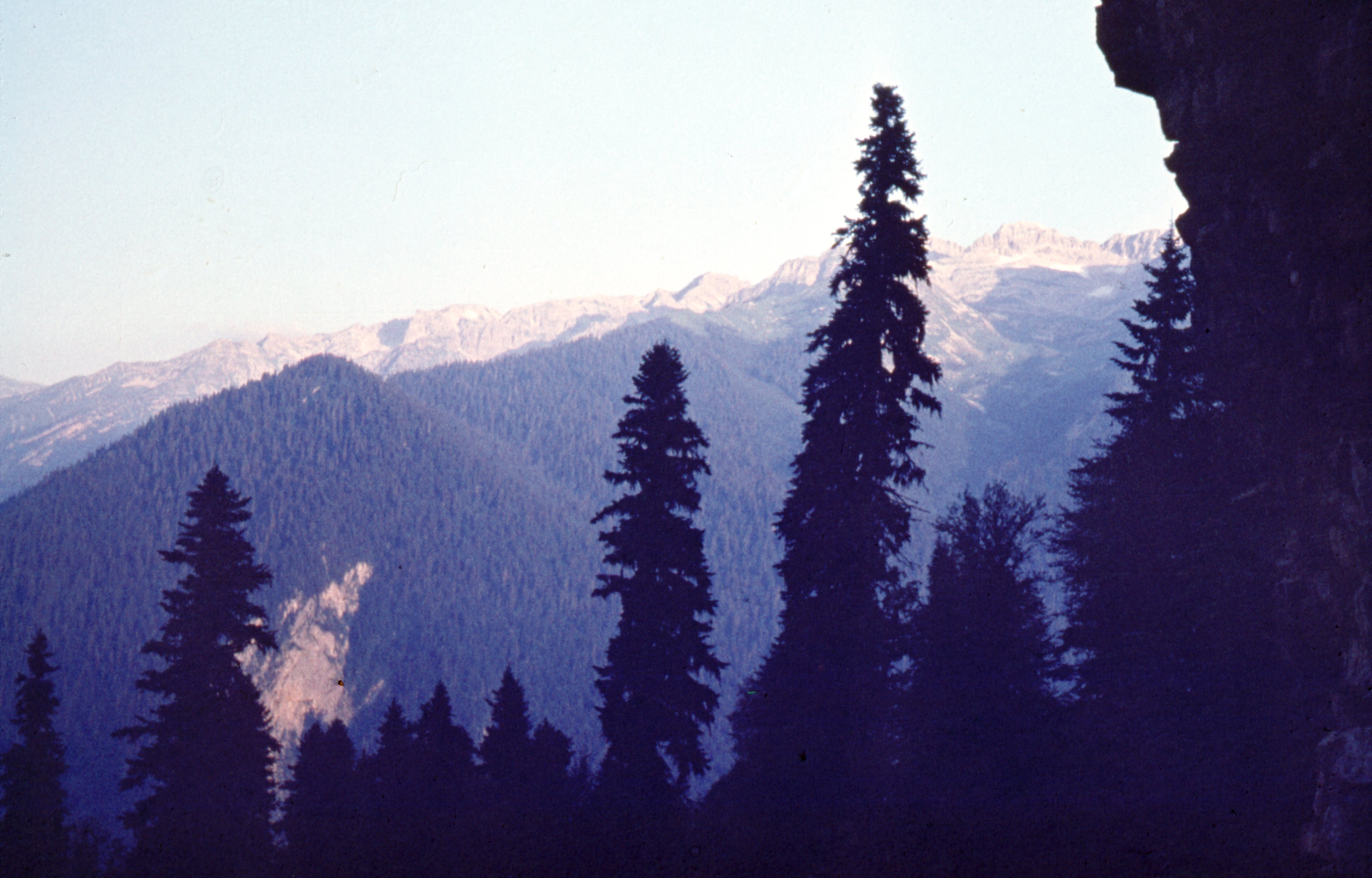
- View of Bzyb Range from north side.

Highest point
- Peak: Khimsa
- Elevation: 3,032 m (9,948 ft)
- Coordinates: 43°16′27″N 41°11′51″E

Dimensions
- Length: 50 km (31 mi)

Geography
- Location within Abkhazia Location within Georgia
- Country: Georgia
- Region: Abkhazia (Note: The political status of Abkhazia is disputed. Having unilaterally declared independence from Georgia in 1992, Abkhazia is formally recognised as an independent state by 4 UN member states (three other states previously recognised it but then withdrew their recognition), while the remainder of the international community recognizes it as de jure Georgian territory. Georgia continues to claim the area as its own territory, designating it as Russian-occupied territory.)
- Range coordinates: 43°18′N 40°55′E
- Parent range: Caucasus Mountains
- Borders on: Greater Caucasus

Bzyb Mountain Range (Georgian: ბზიფის ქედი, bzipis kedi; Abkhaz: Агеишьха, Ageish'kha) is a mountain range in Abkhazia, Georgia on the southern slope of the western part of Greater Caucasus. The ridge is about 50 km long.

== Geography ==
The Bzyb Range's length is about 50 km and elevation is up to 3,033 m, it is made mainly of limestone with pronounced karst landscape. It is bounded by the valley of the Bzyb River from the north and west and partially by the valley of Kelasuri River, which separates it from the Abkhaz Range.

The highest point is mountain Khimsa (3032 m), the second highest is Mount Dzishra (2623 m). There are a number of passes, including Dow - 1387 m, Himsa - 2454 m, Gudauta. The ridge contains many karst wells, mines and caves.

From the north and west it is delimited by the Bzyb river valley, from the east - by a slight depression behind the mountain Himsa (Amtkel pass) and the river valley Amtkeli, delimiting it from Abkhaz Range. To the south, it gradually decreases to the Black Sea plains. The northern slope of the ridge is steep, the southern slope is gentle and is divided into separate spur and river valleys of Hipsta, Aapsta, Western Gumista, Eastern Gumista, Kelasuri.

== Flora ==
Bzyb Range slopes are covered with broadleaved and coniferous forests. At a higher elevations there are alpine meadows.

== Tourist attractions ==
One of the attractions is the Snezhnaya (Snowy) Cave, the most speleologically complex in the whole former Soviet Union. It is the fourth in the list of deepest caves in the world.

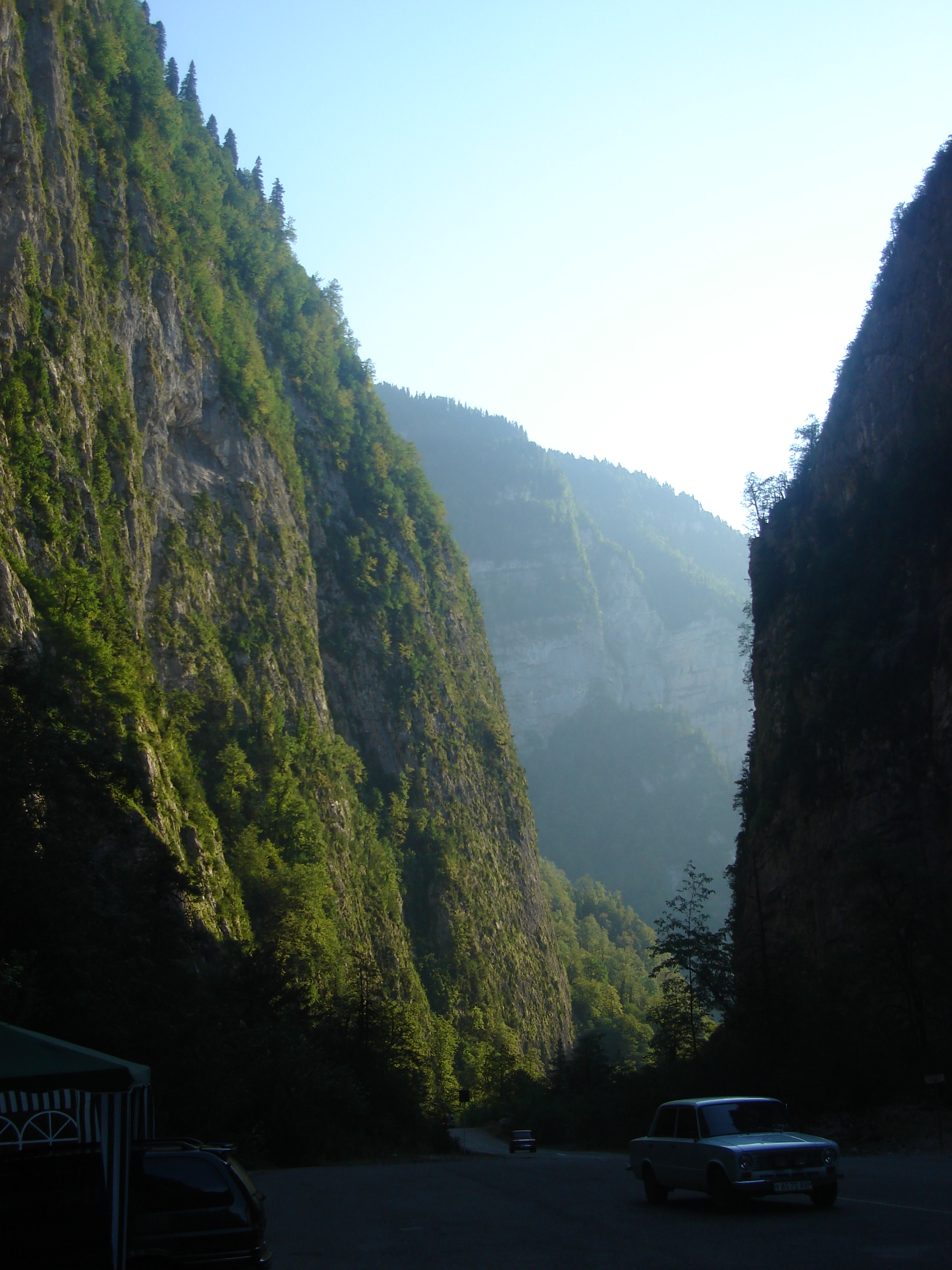
A place where the Gagra Range comes most closely to the Bzyb Range is called Stone Sack and is a popular tourist attraction. One can see mountains of both ranges overhead. This is a view from the Stone Sack to the lower stream of the Bzyb River.

== See also ==
- Gagra Range
- Kodori Range
