= Sakeni (river) =

River in Georgia

- Native name: საკენი (Georgian)

Location
- Country: Georgia
- Disputed Region: Abkhazia (Note: The political status of Abkhazia is disputed. Having unilaterally declared independence from Georgia in 1992, Abkhazia is formally recognised as an independent state by 5 UN member states (two other states previously recognised it but then withdrew their recognition), while the remainder of the international community recognizes it as de jure Georgian territory. Georgia continues to claim the area as its own territory, designating it as Russian-occupied territory.)
- Villages: Sakeni; Omarishara; Martskhena Gentsvishi

Physical characteristics
- Source: Memuli Glacier, Kodori Range
  - location: Mestia Municipality, Georgia
  - coordinates: 43.165877°N 42.129849°E
  - elevation: 2834 m
- Mouth: Kodori
  - location: Martskhena Gentsvishi
  - coordinates: 43°06′21.9″N 41°49′22.4″E
  - elevation: 748 m
- Length: 35 km (22 mi)
- Basin size: 233 km^{2} (90 sq mi)
- Discharge
  - average: 20.6 m^{3}/s (730 cu ft/s)

Basin features
- Progression: Kodori→ Black Sea
- Landmarks: Sakeni Church
- Tributaries
  - left: Chepara, Khvarashi, Bardgnakravari, Nachvali, Tsemratimra
  - right: Albaki
- Waterbodies: Topi Lake

Sakeni (Georgian: საკენი, romanized: sak'eni Abkhaz: Сакьан, romanized: Sak'yan) is a river of western Georgia, in the north-east of Abkhazia. It originates in the Caucasus Mountains, in the eastern part of Upper Abkhazia and flows south-west to the Kodori river, entering it north of the village of Martskhena Gentsvishi. The river is 35 kilometres (22 mi) long, the drainage basin is approximately 233 square kilometres (90 sq mi), and the average discharge is 20.6 cubic metres per second (730 cu ft/s). The river is mainly fed by rain, snow, and glacier runoff of the Caucasus Mountains as well as by underground water sources.
