= Abrskil Cave =

Cave in Abkhazia, Georgia

Abrskil(a) Cave
- Abrskila, Achuats Tizgo
- Location within Georgia Location within Abkhazia
- Location: Abkhazia, (Note: The political status of Abkhazia is disputed. Having unilaterally declared independence from Georgia in 1992, Abkhazia is formally recognised as an independent state by 5 UN member states (two other states previously recognised it but then withdrew their recognition), while the remainder of the international community recognizes it as de jure Georgian territory. Georgia continues to claim the area as its own territory, designating it as Russian-occupied territory.) Georgia
- Coordinates: 42.920556°N 41.554722°E
- Length: 2,000 m (6,600 ft)
- Geology: Karst cave

Abrskil Cave or Abrskila (Georgian: აბრსკილის მღვიმე) is a stalactite cave near Otapi village in Abkhazia, Georgia. It is named after the national hero of Abrskil — a parallel folk hero of the Greek Prometheus and Georgian Amiran — known as Abkhaz Prometheus. It is also called the Otap cave. Abrskila is more than 2 km in length out of which about 1.5 to 1.7 km is accessible for viewing. Its beauty and fame is compared favourably with another cave known as the New Athos Cave.

== Geography ==
Abrskil Cave is located in the picturesque southern slopes of the Panavi ridge near the port of Ochamchire, in karstic limestone. The cave is about 2 km long (3 km length including passages has also been reported), out of which 1.5 to 1.7 km has been made accessible. The cave has a winding gallery from where Achkitzgo River is seen to emerge. This gallery has six chambers, out of which the main hall is studded with naturally developed, elegantly formed stalactites, stalagmites, helictites, columns, curtains and so forth, formed in karstic limestone formations. These halls have been illuminated by lights to make them look attractive and the most impressive hall is called the Heliktitův Hall. The access entrance to the cave has watch towers known as Abkhazian Wall, where a water fall is also seen. It is the second longest cave in Abkhazia.

During the visit of President Sergey Bagapsh on 6 June 2010 to the village of Otap and the Abrskil Cave with Member of Parliament Zaur Adleiba and the Ochamchira district governor Murman Dzhopua and pledged to provide the assistance needed to restore a tourist route to Abrskil cave. The villagers of Otap rely heavily on tourists visiting this cave for their livelihoods and selling locally produced farm goods to them. The Abkhaz state-owned company, Chernomorenergo, has been responsible for providing the cave with electricity to light up the tunnels and attract more tourists to fuel the local economy. The cave has been developed with improved infrastructure facilities to encourage tourism to the place.

== Legend ==
The legend that is directly linked to the Abrskil Cave is that of Abraskil, the folk hero of Abkhazian. According to the popular folk legend of Abkhazian, Abraskil is the name of the legendary boy born out of wedlock to a lovely girl called Abkhazia. He grew up in wild and wayward ways. He was unlike other boys and grew up into a very strong, handsome person with huge ambitions. He could ride on a horse and hurl large stones while riding on it. His favourite horse was called Arasch. His bravery and daring was a kind of Robin Hood image for his friends and compatriots. He challenged God that he was as good as Him and that he could perform any act which God could do. He moved between the mountains and the sea with great aplomb and abandon; he was kind of invincible in his movements on his magic horse Arasch. He had a following of compatriots. However, God told Abrskil to give up his cruel killing of people and destruction of forest land. He was asked to submit himself before God for punishment. Since Abrskil was very proud and brave he refused and God became furious and directed His angels to capture Abrskil as prisoner to mete out suitable punishment. The apostles of god, called as afehambres, were appointed by god to catch Abraskil. Abraskil used a handy tool called alabasha (kind of a bludgeon) to negotiate from place to place between the mountain and the sea, performing a Tarzan act, making it difficult for the apostles or angels to catch him. The apostles then hatched a plan to catch him by spreading slippery cow skins near the sea. As Abraskil jumped with his horse Arasch from the mountain to the sea shore, his horse slipped and he fell and was hurt. He was immediately caught by the angles. He made every effort to escape but woodpeckers help was sought to break his alabasha to prevent him from escaping. As he fell from his horse towards the shores of the Black Sea, his alabasha also broke and he was caught within the cow skin near the sea. He could not escape. He was then tied up and brought to a cave in a nearby hill, close to the Otapi village. There, he was chained to a pillar in the cave and his horse was also tied to a nearby post. For seven days and nights he tried in vain to break loose from the post. As he was making these efforts to get free, a bird – boloqanqara – sat on the pillar. Abraskil was furious and he struck at the bird with the hammer. As his bad luck would have it, the hammer got firmly stuck in the pillar and the bird flew away. He and his horse could not escape. He was imprisoned in the cave. The cave where he and his horse were tied up is now famous and is called the achuats tizgo (which means the place of horse's dung). While his friends, particularly Djmlot, tried to get him freed, the fair skinned blue eyed people of the village exulted at his plight in the cave. He could not escape from the cave.
