= Church of Bzyb =

Ruined medieval Christian church in Abkhazia/Georgia

Church of Bzyb ბზიფის ტაძარი (in Georgian)
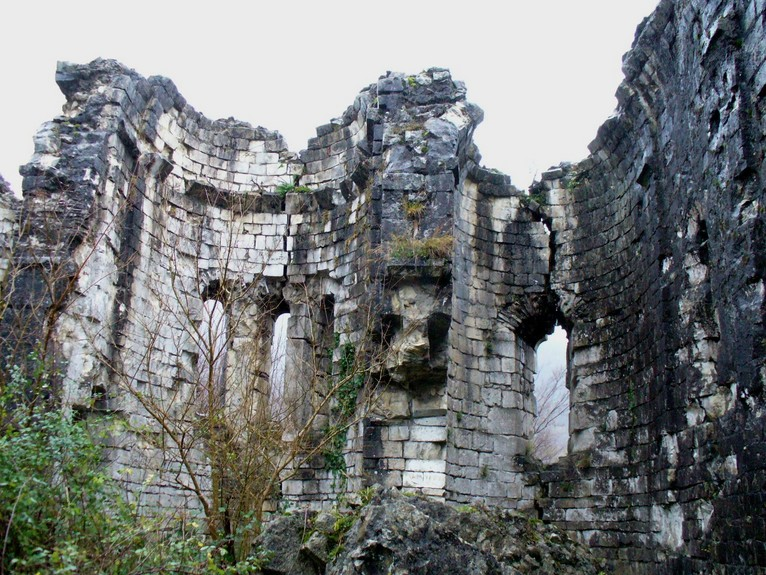
- Ruins of the Bzyb church in 2006.

- Location within Abkhazia Location within Georgia

Religion
- Affiliation: Georgian Orthodox
- Province: Abkhazia
- Ecclesiastical or organizational status: ruins

Location
- Location: (Georgia (country)) Bzyb, Gagra District, Abkhazia, Georgia
- Interactive map of Church of Bzyb ბზიფის ტაძარი (in Georgian)
- Coordinates: 43°14′27″N 40°23′45″E

Architecture
- Type: Church
- Completed: 9th-10th century

The Bzyb Church (Georgian: ბზიფის ტაძარი, romanized: bzipis t'adzari) is a ruined medieval Christian church at the village of Bzyb in Gagra District, Abkhazia/Georgia, on the right bank of the Bzyb River.

== History ==
Church is part of the Bzyb fortress complex and date to the latter half of the 9th century or 10th century.

The church, dated to the second half of the 9th century, is a large domed cross-in-square design, with three projecting apses. Only the ruins of walls covered with blocks of hewn stone survive. They are located in the upper portion of the ruined fortress; the lower part was once crossed by an old road. The fortress was strategically placed to guard the Bzyb valley. To the east of the Bzyb church, remains of an older church are visible. The church may have served as the seat of the Byzantine bishop of Soterioupolis.

Georgia has inscribed the church on the list of Cultural Monuments of National Significance and reported an inadequate state of conservation.
