= Dombay-Ulgen =

Mountain in Georgia

Dombai-Ulgen
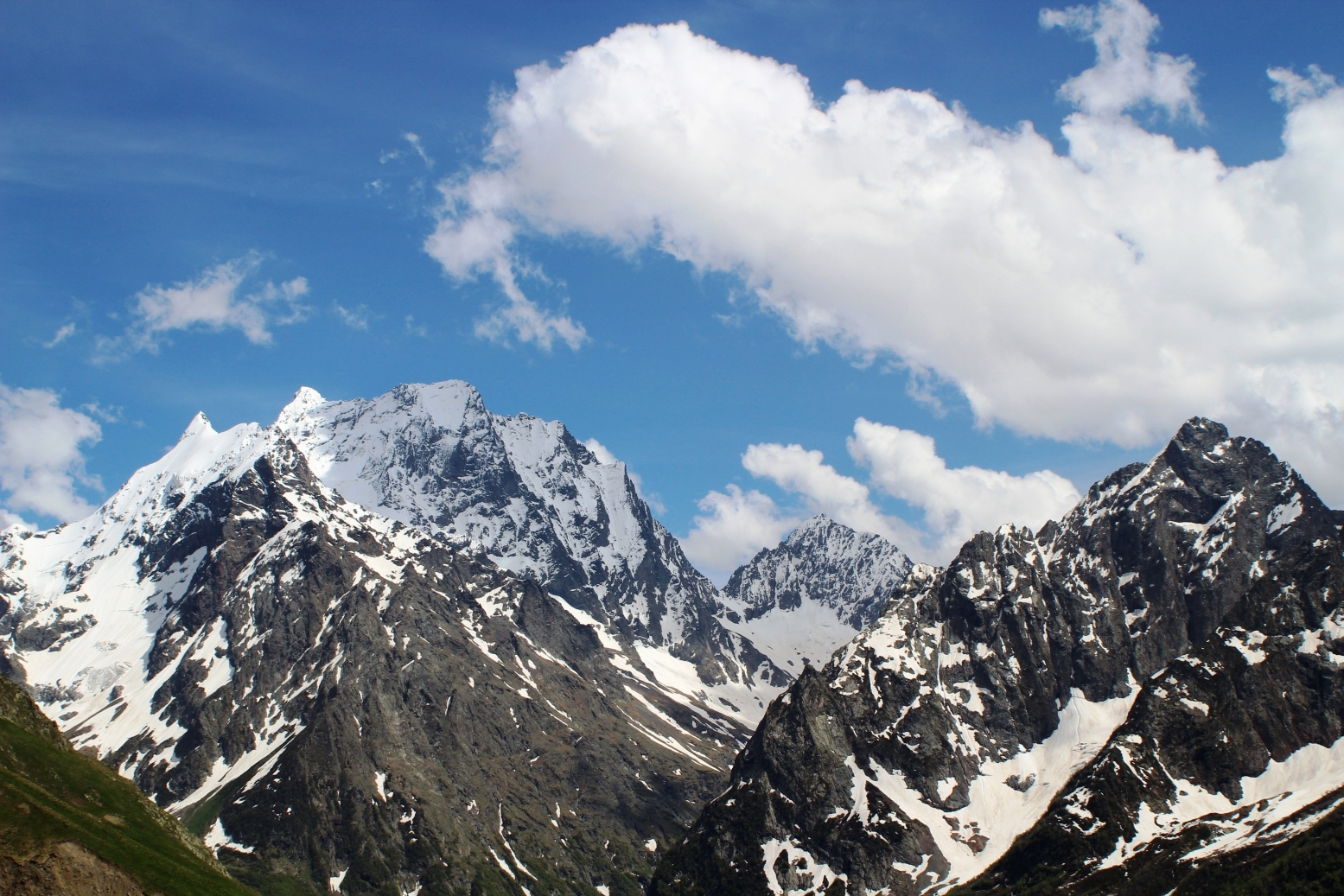

Highest point
- Elevation: 4,046 m (13,274 ft)
- Prominence: 1,265 m (4,150 ft)
- Isolation: 54.09 km (33.61 mi)
- Listing: Ribu
- Coordinates: 43°14′37″N 41°43′38″E

Naming
- English translation: The killed bison
- Language of name: Karachay-Balkar

Geography
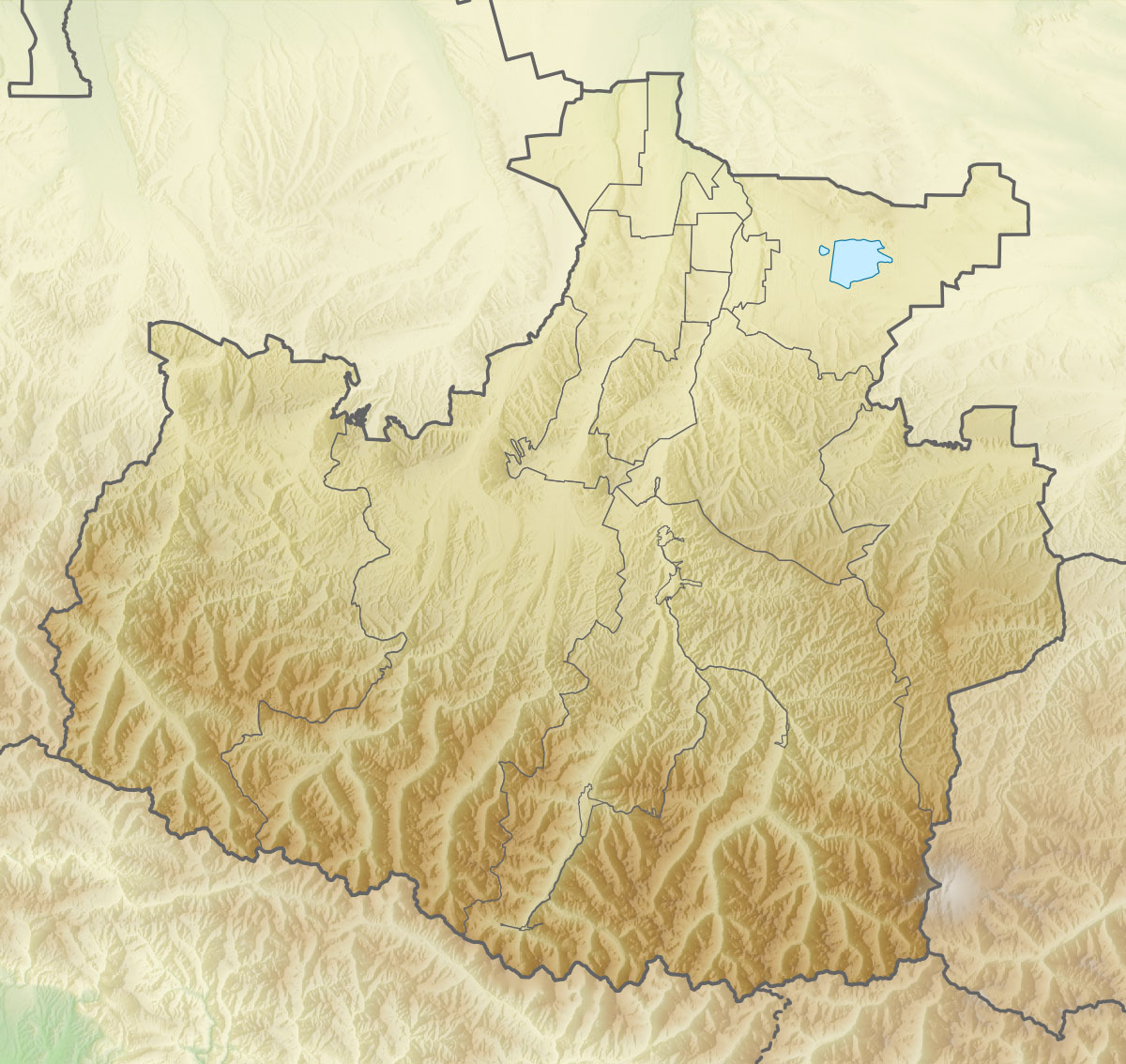
- Location within Karachay-Cherkessia Location within Abkhazia Location within Georgia Location within Caucasus Mountains
- Location: Abkhazia, Georgia - Russia
- Countries: Georgia and Russia
- Parent range: Caucasus

Dombai-Ulgen or Dombay-Ulgen (Georgian: დომბაი-ულგენი; Russian: Домбай-Ульген, Karachay-Balkar: Доммай ёлген) is a 4,046-metre-high (13,274 ft) mountain of the Greater Caucasus and the highest point of Abkhazia, a state with limited international recognition otherwise seen to be part of Georgia. It is located on the border with Karachay–Cherkessia, an autonomous republic of Russia. The mountain is composed of gneiss, crystalline schist, and granite. The top is covered by snow and glaciers at all times of the year.

== Photo Gallery ==
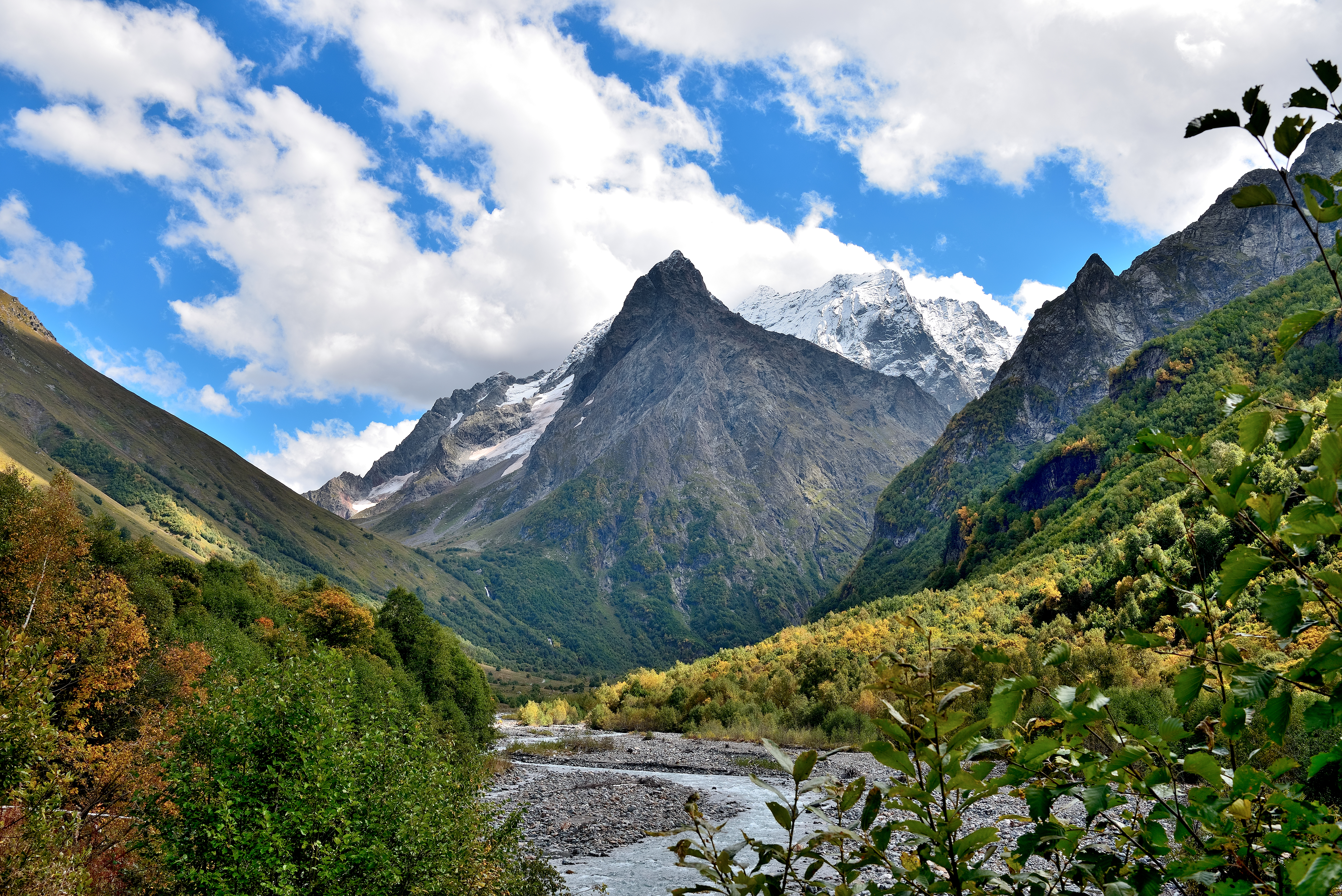
View of the mountain from the gorge from the side of Dombay

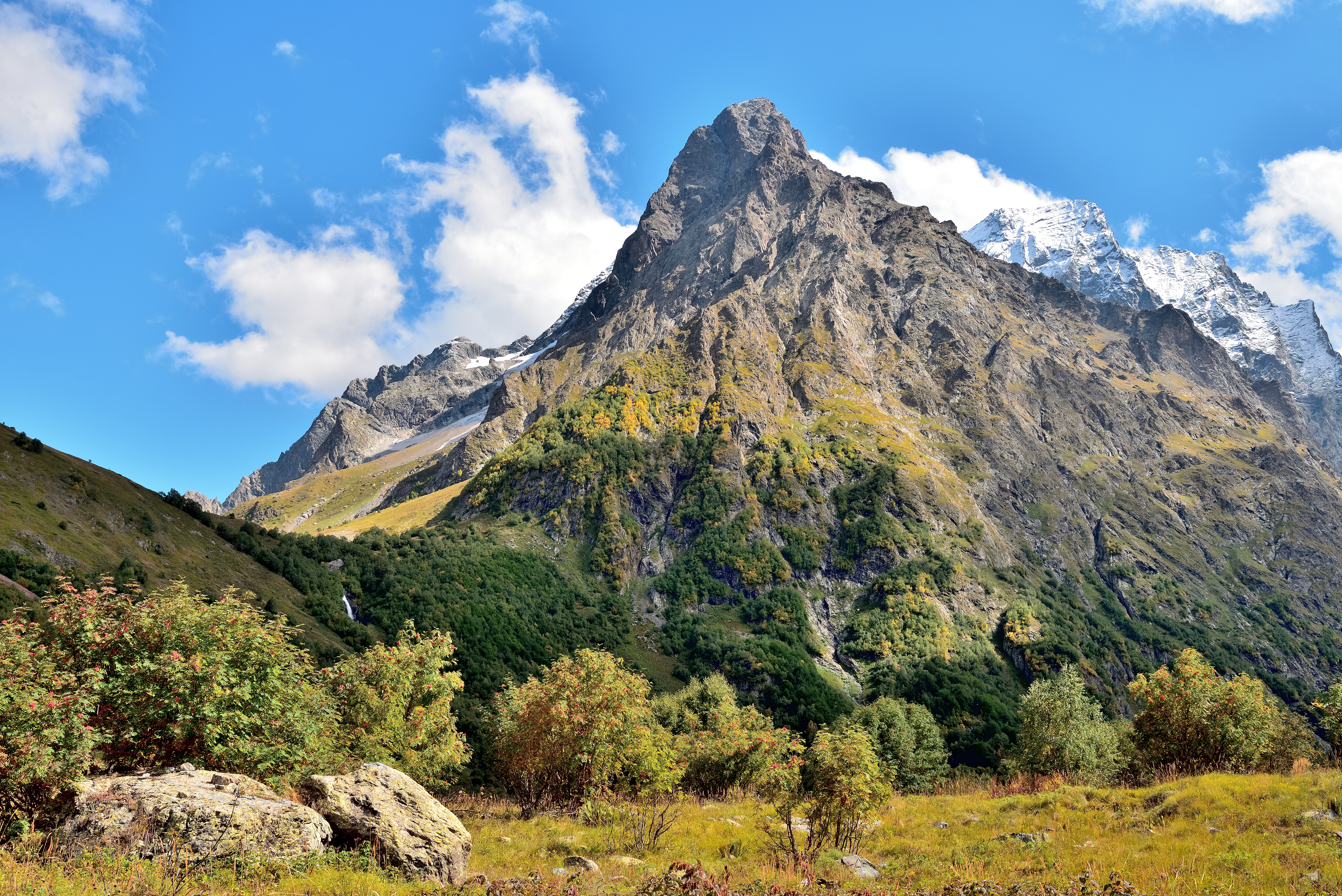
Dombai-Ulgen Gorge

== See also ==
- Geography of Abkhazia
- Geography of Georgia (country)
- Geography of Russia
- List of countries by highest point (Countries with disputed sovereignty)
