= Abrskil =

Abrskil or Abrskila was the hero of Abkhazian national epos, Abrskil. He was a role model of the Greek Prometheus and hence was also known as Abkhaz Prometheus. The Abrskil Cave, a notable landmark near the village of Otapi, is named after this legend.

== Legend ==
According to the popular folk legend of Abkhazian, Abraskil is the name of the legendary boy born out of wedlock to a lovely girl called Abkhazia. He grew up in wild and wayward ways. He was unlike other boys and grew up into a very strong, handsome person with huge ambitions. He could ride on a horse and hurl large stones while riding on it. His favourite horse was called Arasch. His bravery and daring was a kind of Robin Hood image for his friends and compatriots. He challenged God that he was as good as Him and that he could perform any act which God could do. He moved between the mountains and the sea with great aplomb and abandon; he was kind of invincible in his movements on his magic horse Arasch. He had a following of compatriots.

However, God told Abrskil to give up his cruel killing of people and destruction of forest land. He was asked to submit himself before God for punishment. Since Abrskil was very proud and brave he refused and God became furious and directed His angels to capture Abrskil as prisoner to mete out suitable punishment. The apostles of God, called as afehambres, were appointed by God to catch Abraskil. Abraskil used a handy tool called alabasha (a kind of bludgeon) to negotiate from place to place between the mountain and the sea, performing a Tarzan act that made it difficult for the apostles or angels to catch him.

The apostles then hatched a plan to catch him by spreading slippery cow skins near the sea. As Abraskil jumped with his horse Arasch from the mountain to the sea shore, his horse slipped and he fell and was hurt. He was immediately caught by the angels. He made every effort to escape but woodpeckers' help was sought to break his alabasha to prevent him from escaping. As he fell from his horse towards the shores of the Black Sea, his alabasha also broke and he was caught within the cow skin near the sea. He could not escape.

He was then tied up and brought to a cave in a nearby hill, close to the Otap village. There, he was chained to a pillar in the cave and his horse was also tied to a nearby post. For seven days and nights he tried in vain to break loose from the post. As he was making these efforts to get free, a bird (boloqanqara) sat on the pillar. Abraskil was furious and he struck at the bird with the hammer. As his bad luck would have it, the hammer got firmly stuck in the pillar and the bird flew away. He and his horse could not escape. He was imprisoned in the cave. The cave where he and his horse were tied up is now famous and is called the achuats tizgo ("place of horse’s dung"). While his friends, particularly Djmlot, tried to get him freed, the fair-skinned, blue-eyed people of the village exulted at his plight in the cave. He could not escape from the cave.

== Historical perspective ==
According to ancient historical records, it has been inferred that Abrasil, the folk hero of Abkhazian, was known to the ancient Greeks as well. A parallel has therefore been drawn between the Greek folk mythical hero, Promethesus, and that of Abrasil.

In ancient times, the Greeks had founded the Black Sea colonies. They were fully aware of the warriors of the coastal regions of the Black Sea who acted like pirates in the region. These people were identified as the Heniochis. This class of people were the ancestors of the present-day Abkhazians. The folk hero of Abkhazians was thus known to the Greeks and they in turn created their own folk hero and called him Promethesus. Their folk hero was also punished by gods for bringing “fire to humanity”. The difference in the folk legend is that Promethesus was tied to the mountains and subjected to torture by attack by eagles.

== Abrskil Cave ==
A notable landmark connected with the legend of the folk hero is the Abrskil Cave (or "Abrskila") located near the village of Otap. The cave is named after the hero of Abkhazian national epos, Abrskil, where he was imprisoned. This karst cave reaches a length of about 2 km (3 km in some references) although only 1,500–1,700 meters are accessible to tourists. The part of the cave which is open to tourists consists of several chambers studded with stalactites, and stalagmites.
