= Pkhista =

Coordinates: 43.4734°N 40.0448°E

- Mouth
- Native name: Georgian: ფხისთა

Location
- Country: Georgia, Abkhazia

Physical characteristics
- Length: 13 km (8.1 mi)

Basin features
- Progression: Pkhista→ Psou→ Black Sea

The Pkhista (Georgian: ფხისთა) is a river in the West Caucasus, near the border between Georgia (Abkhazia) and Russia. It has a length of 13 kilometres (8.1 mi) and flows into the left (eastern) bank of the Psou to the south of the village of Salkhino. It is one of two main left tributaries of the Psou River, the other being the Besh River. Both tributaries are in Georgia.
