= Kodori Range =

Mountain range in Abkhazia, Georgia

- Location within Abkhazia Location within Georgia

Highest point
- Peak: Mount Moguashirkha
- Elevation: 3,852 m (12,638 ft)

Dimensions
- Length: 75 km (47 mi)

Geography
- Country: Georgia
- Disputed Region: Abkhazia (Note: The political status of Abkhazia is disputed. Having unilaterally declared independence from Georgia in 1992, Abkhazia is formally recognised as an independent state by 4 UN member states (three other states previously recognised it but then withdrew their recognition), while the remainder of the international community recognizes it as de jure Georgian territory. Georgia continues to claim the area as its own territory, designating it as Russian-occupied territory.)
- Range coordinates: 42°57′N 41°47′E
- Parent range: Western Caucasus

Kodori range (Georgian: კოდორის ქედი, romanized: k'odoris kedi Abkhaz: Кәыдрытәи ахықә, romanized: Kəydrytəi ahykə) is a mountain range in the west Greater Caucasus, in the eastern border part of Abkhazia, Georgia.

== Geography ==
The longest and most branched ridge of Abkhazia. It is a southwestern spur of the Main Caucasian (or Dividing) ridge, from which the Dalari pass departs and east of the Gvandra peak (3985 m.). It stretches for almost 75 km from north-east to south-west. From the northwest it is delimited by the Sakeni river valley (beginning Kodori), from the southeast - by the Enguri valleys and its tributary Nenskra.

The ridge line has sharp ups and downs. The highest peaks are Moguashirkha (3852 m) and Kharikhra (3710 m); are located in the northern and Khojali Mountain (3313 m) in central parts of the ridge.

It is composed mainly of volcanic rocks, shale and sandstone.

On the slopes of the southern spurs there is surrounded by mountains, town Tkvarcheli.

== See also ==
- Bzyb Range
- Gagra Range
