= Mokvi (river) =

- Location within Abkhazia Location within Georgia

Location
- Country: Georgia (Abkhazia)

Physical characteristics
- Source
  - location: Caucasus Major
  - coordinates: 42.9644°N 41.7664°E
  - elevation: 2,560 m (8,400 ft)
- Mouth: Georgia/Abkhazia
  - location: Black Sea
  - coordinates: 42.7481°N 41.4139°E
  - elevation: 0 ft (0 m)
- Length: 47 km (29 mi)
- Basin size: 336 square kilometres (130 mi^{2})
- Discharge
  - average: 18 m^{3}/s (640 cu ft/s)

Mokvi (Georgian: მოქვი; Abkhaz: Мықу) is a river in the Ochamchire Municipality of Abkhazia, Georgia. The river's length is about 47 km and watershed — 336 km2. It forms on southern slopes of Kodori Range, at 2560 meters above sea level. The river mouth with the Black Sea is near the village Jukmuri. Mokvi river feeds by snow, rain and groundwater.
