= Mount Agepsta =

Mountain in the Gagra Range of the Caucasus Mountains System

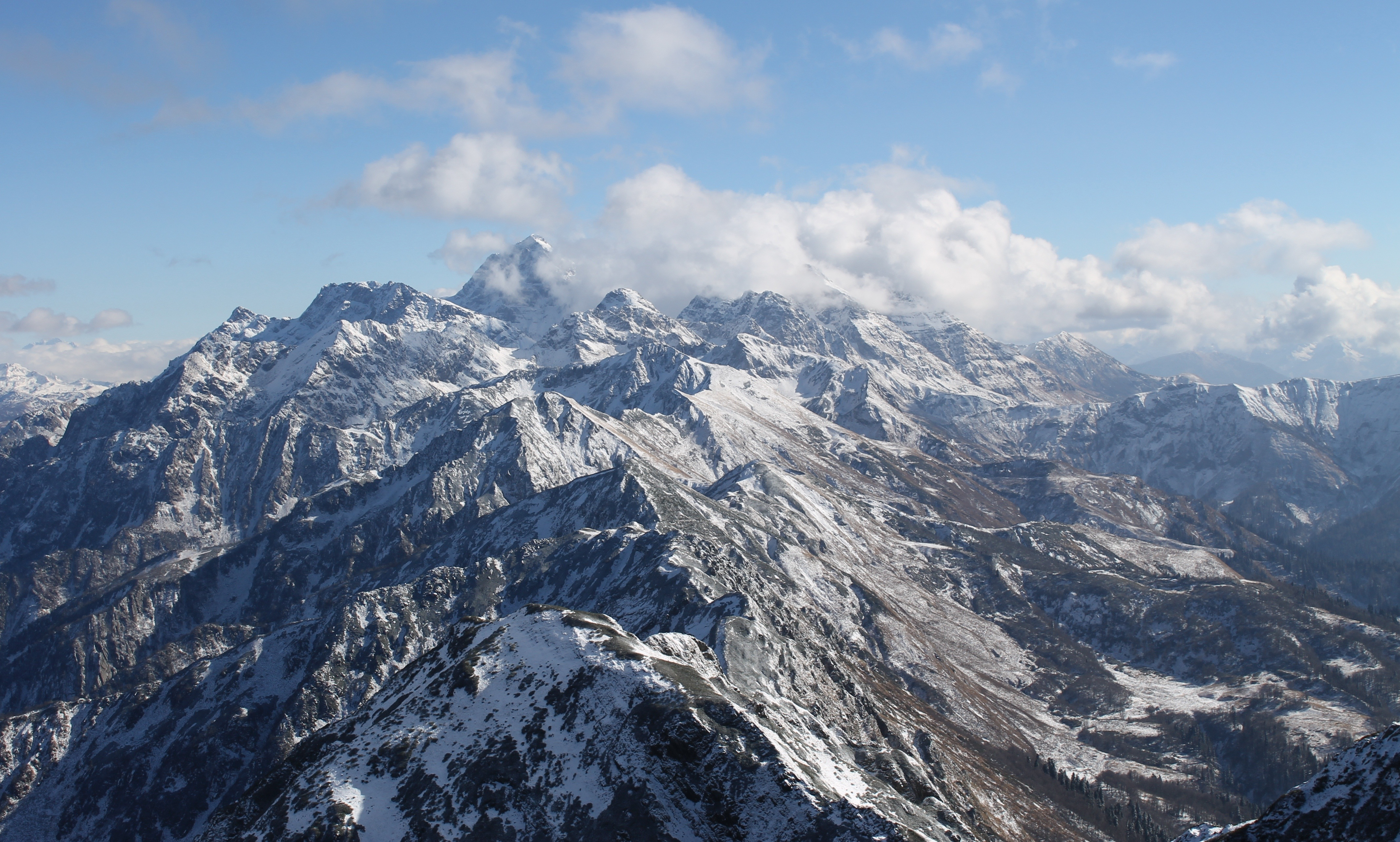
- Agepsta from Aibga Ridge

Highest point
- Elevation: 3,357 m (11,014 ft)
- Prominence: 1,160 m (3,810 ft)
- Isolation: 35.37 km (21.98 mi)
- Listing: Ribu
- Coordinates: 43°32′54″N 40°28′50″E

Geography
- Location within Georgia
- Country: Georgia
- Region: Gagra District
- Parent range: Gagra Range

Mount Agepsta (Georgian: აგეფსთა, romanized: agepsta, Abkhaz: Аҕьаҧсҭа, Agh'aphstha) is a mountain in the Gagra Range of the Caucasus Mountains system located in Republic of Abkhazia,

The summit is 3,357 m (11,014 ft) above sea level in elevation.

== Ecology ==
The slopes of Mount Agepsta, up to an elevation of 1,700–1,800 m (5,577–5,906 ft), are forested in Nordmann Fir (Abies nordmanniana) and Oriental Beech (Fagus orientalis) forests. They are in the Caucasus mixed forests ecoregion of the Temperate broadleaf and mixed forests Biome.

Higher elevations on the mountain have alpine meadows. The highest elevations near the summit have small glaciers.

== See also ==
- Mountains of the Caucasus
- Mountain ranges of the Caucasus
