= Lake Amtkeli =

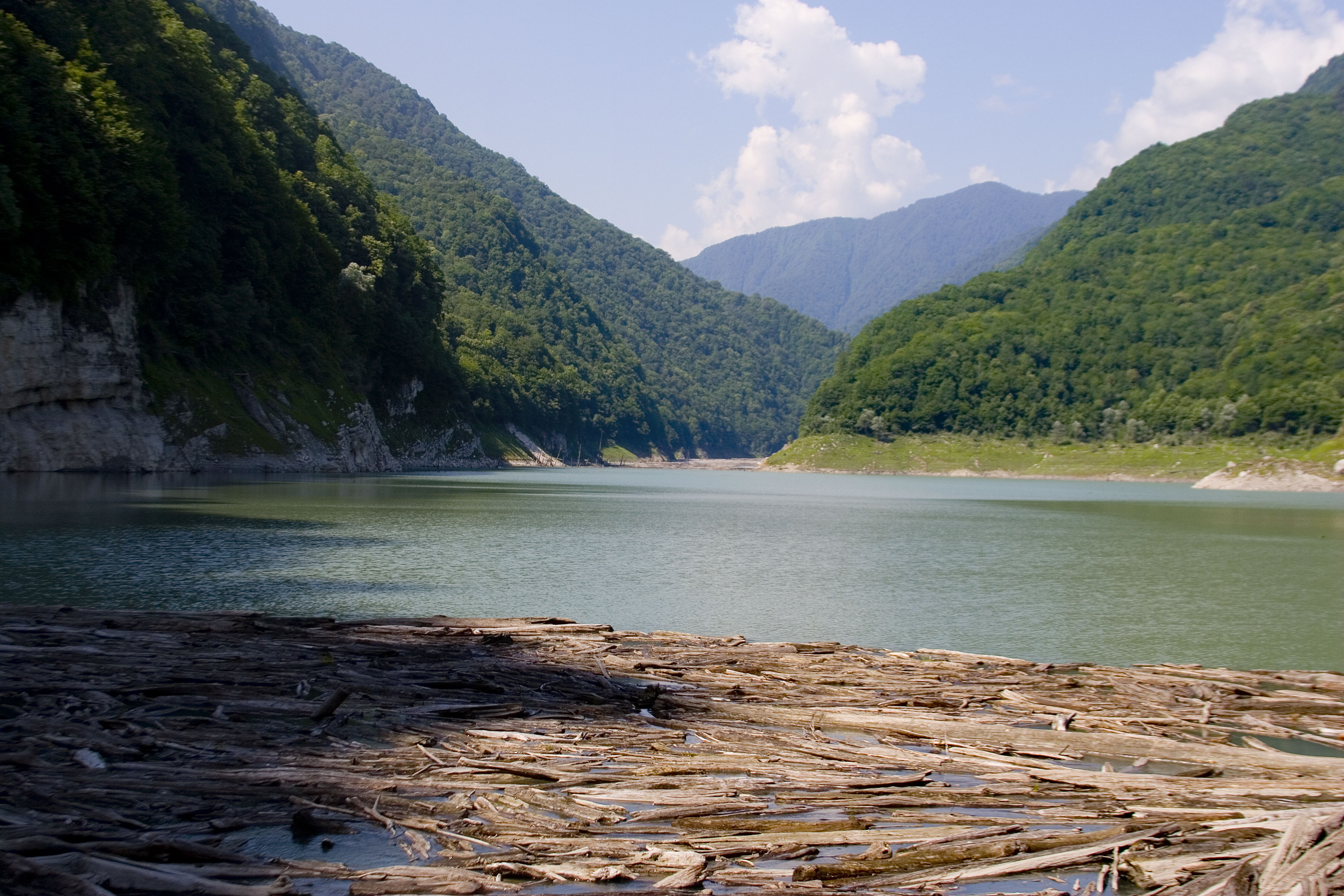

- Location within Abkhazia Location within Georgia
- Interactive map of Lake Amtkeli
- Location: Gulripshi District
- Coordinates: 43°05′42″N 41°17′54″E
- Lake type: Glacial lake
- Primary inflows: Amtkeli
- Primary outflows: Jampali (through sinkholes); Amtkeli
- Catchment area: 153 km^{2} (59 sq mi)
- Basin countries: Georgia, (Abkhazia)
- Built: 3 October 1891
- Max. length: 2.4 km (1.5 mi)
- Surface area: 0.58 km^{2} (0.22 sq mi)
- Max. depth: 65 m (213 ft)
- Surface elevation: 512 m (1,680 ft)
- Frozen: very rarely
- Settlements: Azanta

Lake Amtkeli or Amtkel (Georgian: ამტყელის ტბა; Abkhaz: Амтҟьал) is a lake in the Gulripshi District of Abkhazia, Georgia that was formed on 3 October 1891 when an earthquake caused a landslide on the south-western slope of Mt. little Shkhapach into the valley of the Amtkeli River.

== Geography ==
Lake Amtkeli is fed by the Amtkeli River, but only a small part of its water percolates through the obstructing rubble back into the river. The greater part leaves the lake through underground passages to the Jampali River. Due to the lake's limited discharge capacity, its water level rises strongly during snowmelt in May, leading to annual fluctuations of up to 40 m (131 ft) in the lake's average 512 m (1,680 ft) height above sea level and 65 m (213 ft) maximal depth, and increasing its length from 2.4 km (1.5 mi) to 4 km (2.5 mi). The average surface area of Lake Amtkeli is 0.58 km^{2} (0.22 sq mi), and its drainage basin measures 153 km^{2} (59 sq mi).

Due to the lake's origin, its underwater slopes are steep, following the surface slopes.

=== Human settlement ===
The village of Azanta is located next to lake Amtkeli, and some of its inhabitants keep fishing boats on its shore.

== Environment ==
Lake Amtkeli is home to trout, chub, nase, barbel and spirlin.

In July and August, the lake's average surface temperature is 20 °C (68 °F), in Winter it rarely freezes over.
