= Aapsta =

River in Georgia

- Location within Abkhazia Location within Georgia

Location
- Country: Abkhazia, Georgia
- State: Gudauta District

Physical characteristics
- Source
  - location: Caucasus Major
  - coordinates: 43°17′47″N 40°49′07″E
  - elevation: 1,445 m (4,741 ft)
- Mouth: Georgia/Abkhazia
  - location: Black Sea
  - coordinates: 43°05′17″N 40°41′15″E
  - elevation: 0 ft (0 m)
- Length: 35 km (22 mi)
- Basin size: 243 square kilometres (94 mi^{2})
- Discharge
  - average: 13.2 m^{3}/s (470 cu ft/s)

Aapsta (Georgian: ააფსთა Abkhaz: Аапста) is a river in Abkhazia, Georgia. It originates on the southern slopes of the Achbikhvdar ridge in the Gudauta pass area in beech forests at 1445 meters above sea level; flows into the Black Sea between the village Tskuara (Primorskoe) and the city Gudauta.

== Physical and geographical characteristics ==
The length of the river is 35 kilometers, the catchment area is 243 km^{2}, the slope of the river is 41.3 ‰, the prevailing width of the river is 15 meters, the depth is from 0.3 to 2.1 meters with a current speed of 1.3-1.6 m / s.

In the middle and lower reaches of the coast, overgrown with beech-hornbeam forest. On the river are the villages Aats and Abgarhuk, at the mouth - the village Tskuara (Primorskoe).

The predominant type of feeding is snow feeding in the upper reaches; closer to the mouth, rain feeding becomes important. Average mineralization of waters is 213 mg / l. The type of water regime is the Black Sea, floods occur at all seasons.

Through the Dokhurtu tributary, Aapsta is connected with the cave system Snezhnaya (Snowy) Cave.

=== Tributaries ===
The Aapsta has 83 tributaries, the density of its river basin is 0.77 km / km^{2}. The main tributaries are:

- Dohurta - left tributary
- Mtsara - left tributary
- Dzish - left tributary
- Dry - left tributary
- Noisy - right tributary
- Fast - left tributary
- Spinal - left tributary
- Mtsaga - right tributary

== Etymology ==
Hydronym comes from the Abkhaz language, from the Abkhazian "aaps" translates as "yew river".
