= Psou =

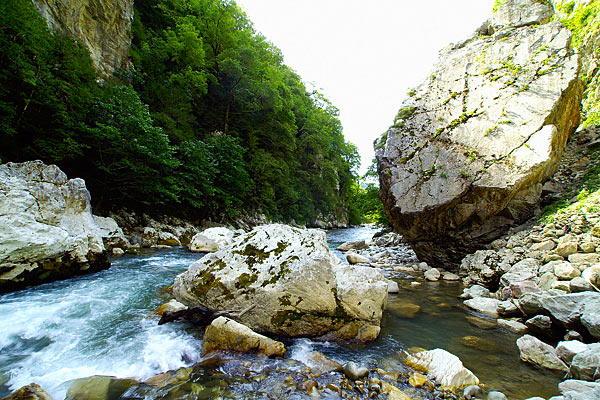

Location
- Country: Georgia (Abkhazia), Russia

Physical characteristics
- Source
  - location: Greater Caucasus
- Mouth
  - location: Black Sea
  - coordinates: 43.3861°N 40.0101°E
- Length: 53 km (33 mi)
- Basin size: 421 km^{2} (163 sq mi)

The Psou (/psoʊ/; Adyghe: Псыу; Georgian: ფსოუ; Abkhaz: Ԥсоу; Russian: Псоу) is a river in the West Caucasus, bordering the Gagra Range to the east. It flows along the southern slopes of the Greater Caucasus Mountain Range and forms a part of the border between Georgia (Abkhazia) and Russia. Its source is in the Aigra Mountain, and it flows into the Black Sea. The Psou is 53 kilometres (33 mi) long, and the drainage basin is approximately 421 square kilometres (163 sq mi). Between the mouth of the river and the mouth of the Mzymta is a "sandy depositional foreland", which is approximately 8 kilometres (5.0 mi) in length and 2 kilometres (1.2 mi) wide.

The principal tributaries of the Psou are the Besh and the Pkhista. Between 1913 and 1955, a hydrological station was in operation at Leselidze, roughly 1.5 kilometres (0.93 mi) upstream of the river's mouth. The Psou gained notoriety as a smuggling route out of the country, by-passing Russian controls on the border. As of 2008 it was still designated as a transboundary river which lacked an international cooperation agreement as part of the UNECE Water Convention.
