= Bzyb (river) =

River in northwestern Abkhazia

Bzyb/Bzipi
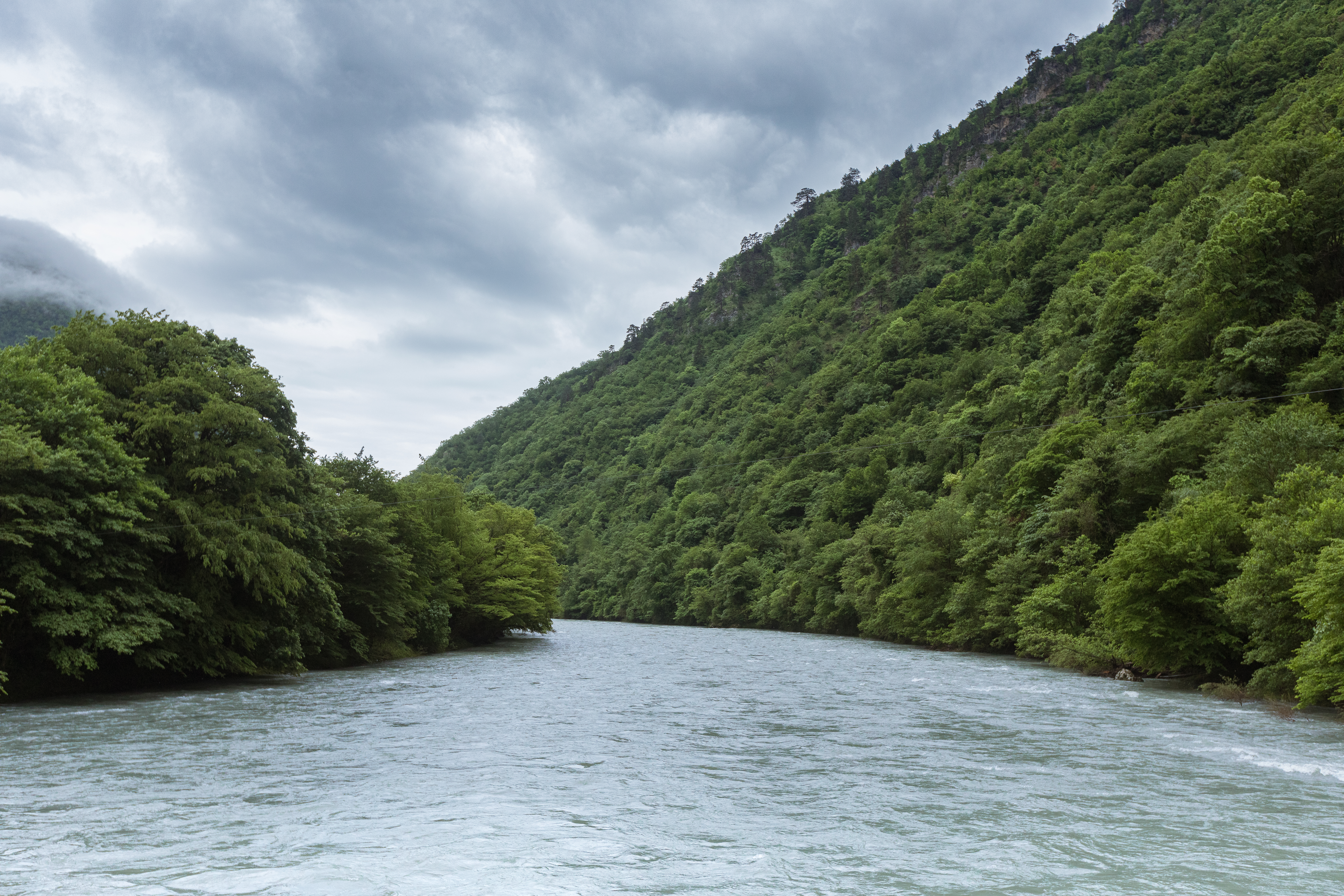
- Bzyb in 2021

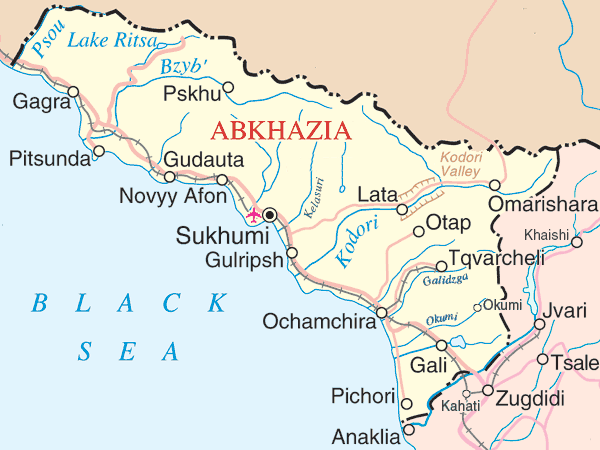
- Map of Abkhazia showing passage of the Bzyb.

Location
- Country: Georgia, (Abkhazia)

Physical characteristics
- Source
  - location: Caucasus Major
  - elevation: 2,300 m (7,500 ft)
- Mouth
  - location: Black Sea
  - coordinates: 43.1864°N 40.2806°E
- Length: 110 km (68 mi)
- Basin size: 1,510 km^{2} (580 mi^{2})
- Discharge
  - average: 96 m^{3}/s (3,400 cu ft/s)

The Bzyb or Bzipi (/bzɪb/ or /bzipi/; Georgian: ბზიფი; Abkhaz: Бзыԥ, romanized: Bzyṗ) is (along with the Kodori) one of the two longest rivers of Abkhazia and the twelfth longest river in Georgia. The river valley has rich biodiversity of herbaceous garden plants, particularly in the gorge section in the upper reaches where the most prominent and colourful bellflower Campanula mirabilis with profuse growth of 100 flowers per plant is given the name, the "Queen of the Abkhazian flora". During 1904-1917 it served as the border between the Russian Empire's Sukhumi Okrug and the Black Sea Governorate.

== Etymology ==
Bzipi is a comparatively new Georgian name of the river. Until the 1820s, the river bore another name (Georgian: კაპოეტისწყალი, romanized: k'ap'oet'ists'q'ali) literally meaning "Water of Kapoeti" (a Georgian term for a cyprinid fish known also as the khramulya).

Georgian scholars associate the name Bzyp with the Georgian name for the box tree (Georgian: ბზა, romanized: bza). Thus, the main river of Abkhazia flowing near the box-trees or the gorge of Bzyp is called the Bzipi.

According to Abkhazian historians the name of the river is derived from bzy, the word for water or river in the language of the neighbouring Ubykh people, or its Abkhaz cognate. Other versions have also been suggested.

== Geography ==
The Bzyb basin is located in the zone of humid subtropics of the Caucasus Mountains. The Bzyb is first among Abkhazia's rivers with respect to length,110 kilometres (68 mi), and second after the Kodori with respect to average annual discharge, 96 cubic metres per second (3,400 cu ft/s) and drainage basin area, 1,510 square kilometres (580 mi^{2}). At its entrance in the mouth of the Black Sea it splits into two estuary channels.

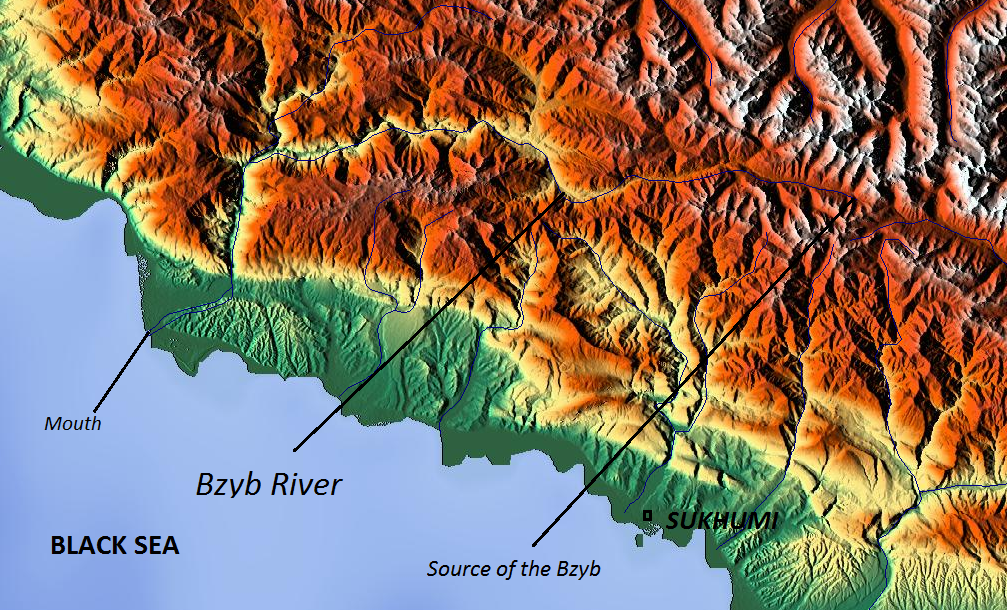
Map of the Bzyb region

Clays, marls, dolomites, and sandstones are encountered at the river Bzyb which flows down from a height of (2,300 m (7,500 ft)) in the western part of the Caucasus Major near 43°17′47″N 41°13′49″E and flows into the Black Sea at 43°11′18″N 40°16′52″E in two branches. Its valley borders the Bzyb Range, Gagra Range and some other ranges of Caucasus Major. The Bzyb separates Arabika from the adjacent Bzyb Range, an outstanding karst area with many deep caves. An upper tributary of the river is the Jimsa which flows in the area of the mountain of the same name. The Bzyb' basin has the Lake Ritsa, which forms the headwaters of the Iupshara. A road from the Black Sea to Lake Ritsa runs along this valley.

Southeast of the Bzyb outfall area is the Pitsunda Cape which projects far out into the Black Sea. Seismic data extracted in the region has revealed that valleys on the submarine slope cut several dozen metres into Miocene-Pliocene conglomerates. This cape was formed over time by the transportation of sediment along the Bzyb and accumulating on the cape. According to the data collected by Mandych in 1967, the Bzyb transports around 170,000 tonnes of course material annually, almost as high as the combined total of the Mzymta and Psou rivers (200,000 tonnes per year). The upper river basin in Northern Abkhazia is home to the Bzyb Abkhaz people (one of the three ethnic groups of Abkhaz), who have their own distinct dialect. Gudaud is another subgroup of Bzyb. The river is used for transportation of logs from the upland forest areas.

The hydropower potential of most significant rivers of the country, the Kodori, Bzyb, Kelasuri, Gumista rivers that form the Black Sea basin, has been assessed to be more than over 3.5 million kW.

== Flora and fauna ==
The river valley has a rich biodiversity of flora, right from the mouth of the river at Pitsunda and extending upstream to the Ritsa Lake. The river forming the upper valley is a gorge section of more than 300 metres (980 ft) height, with steep rock slopes on both banks. On these slopes, herbaceous plants are found; the most prominent of these plants, among many species found here, is the bellflower Campanula mirabilis which is known by the epithet the "Queen of the Abkhazian flora." Blue flowers from these plants (said to bloom 100 flowers per plant) cover the entire gorge section during the months of June to August. Another plant recently identified near the Ritz Lake is given the name Campanula paradoxa and "forms a rosette of large leaves with lateral shoots producing inflorescence of white flowers." Other garden plant species found in the valley are the local bellflowers namely C. albovii and C. dzyschrica. A few other lesser-known flowering plants known here are: Aquilegia gegica (the pale-blue columbine), the Ranunculus suukensis (a buttercup which has large flowers up to 2.5 centimetres (0.98 in) in diameter), and the endemic variety of Geum speciosum; this last species, although closely related to the common aven, differs from it due to the larger size of its flowers and leaves.

At the mouth of the Bzyb is Pitsunda Cape, which has a lake known as Inkit Lake, which is fed by Bzyb. This lake was once an internal harbour connected to the Black Sea when the ancient city of Pityus was founded; archaeological finds at this place have revealed antiquarian artifacts and foundations of structures. It is also mentioned that an ancient temple existing here got flooded consequent to a change in the lake level.

The Bzyb river basin also contains a notable population of fir trees. Significant populations of Darevskia alpina, a species listed as vulnerable by the IUCN, have been recorded in the upper reaches of the Bzyb.

There is also a large Agricultural Experimental Station in the wide part of the Bzyb valley where plant species have been introduced from all parts of the world. Some of the rare collections which have thrived well under the prevailing climatic conditions include the coniferous coastal redwood Sequoia sempervirens and the deodar Cedrus deodara. These are 50-year-old redwoods, which have grown to be 25 metres (82 ft) in height.

The river supports a significant population of Black Sea salmon (also known as kumzha from the name in Georgian: კუმჟა, romanized: k'umzha).

== Recreation and use ==
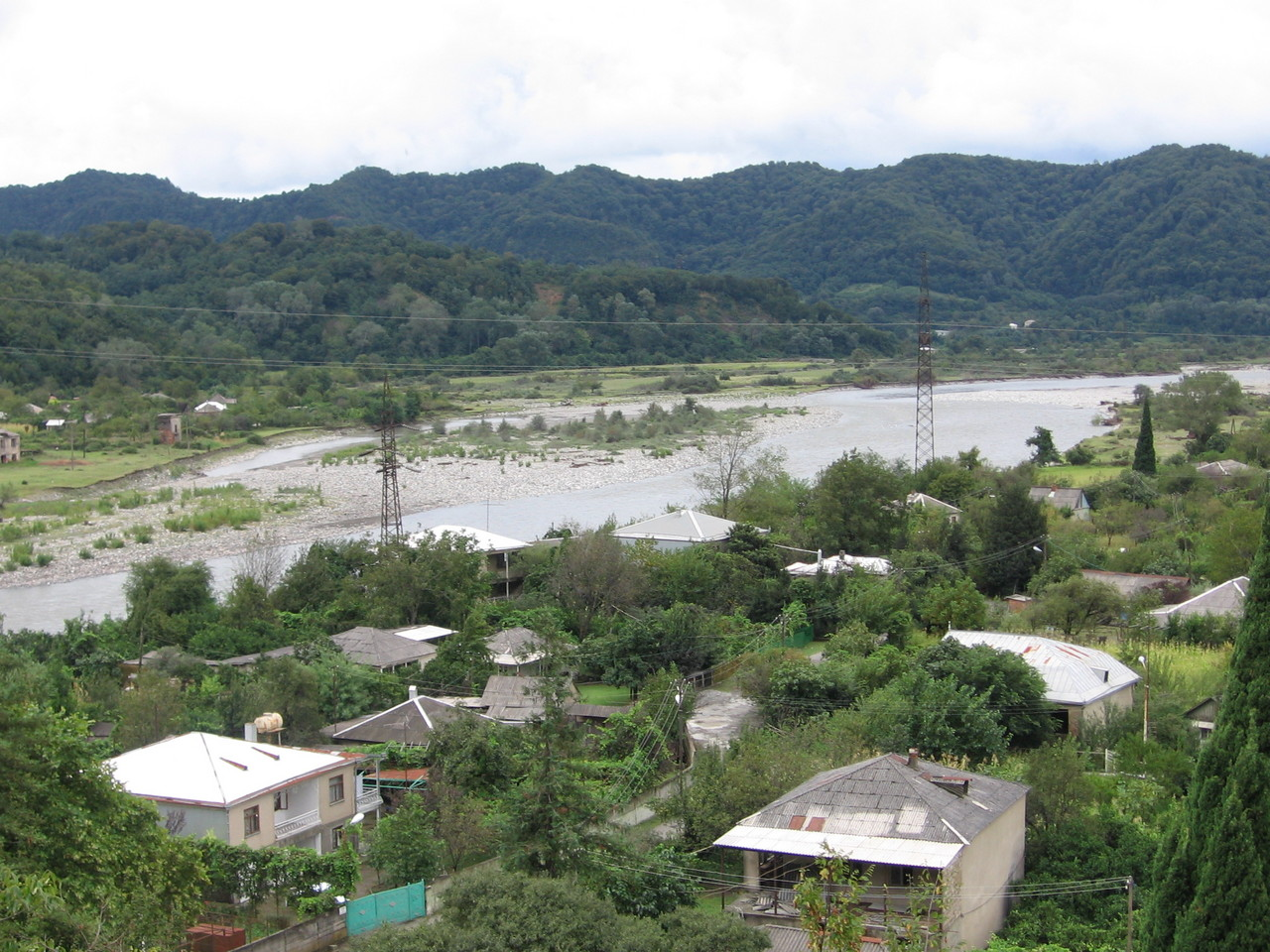
The river Bzyb at Bzyb (village)

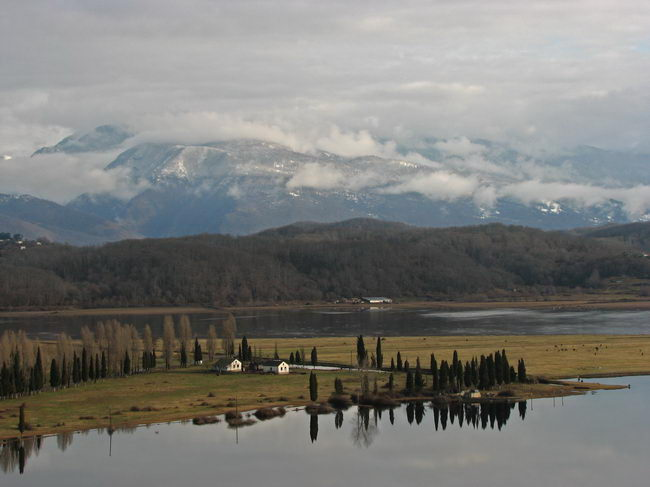
View from Pitsunda Cape at the mouth of Bzyb at the estuary

Soviet General Secretary Nikita Khrushchev once proposed a major dam and hydroelectric power generation facility on the Bzyb, since his favourite resort was located near the mouth of the river at Pitsunda. However, this proposal was ruled out by his experts who opined that a dam built on the Bzyb would have had catastrophic effects in causing beach erosion at Pitsunda. In the end, the dam was built on the Enguri instead, where the impact upon the coastline was assessed to be considerably less pronounced.

It also ensued, when the Soviet president was staying in Pitsunda resort, that he heard rumours that he was to be deposed. He was summoned from here on 13 October 1964 by the Politburo to Moscow when he was given a charge sheet accusing him of nepotism, corruption and several other criminal issues, which was a way of saying that he was deposed. On 14 October, he resigned and giving his briefcase into his son Sergei's hand told him: "That's it. I'm retired."

The river is popular for kayaking and rafting. The mountainous Ritsa Lake region in the Ritsa reserve of Abkhazia is well known for its wines, grown between forests and mountain rivers. The Abkhaz souvenir varieties of wine include the "Ritsa" and "New Athos," among many other varieties.

Pitsunda Cape at the mouth of the Bzyb has many important landmarks such as the ancient settlement of Pitiunt, a lighthouse, a temple of the 10th century, a museum and an old pine tree maintained from 1926.
