= Sakeni Church =

Village of Sakeni, Gulripshi municipality, Autonomous Republic of Abkhazia, Georgia

Sakeni Church საკენის ეკლესია (in Georgian)
- Location within Abkhazia Location within Georgia

Religion
- Affiliation: Georgian Orthodox
- District: Gulripshi Municipality
- Province: Abkhazia

Location
- Location: (Georgia (country)) Sakeni, Gulripshi Municipality, Abkhazia, Georgia
- Interactive map of Sakeni Church საკენის ეკლესია (in Georgian)
- Coordinates: 43°05′30″N 41°53′55″E

Architecture
- Type: Church
- Completed: Middle Ages

The Sakeni Church (Georgian: საკენის ეკლესია) is a church in the village of Sakeni, Gulripshi Municipality, Autonomous Republic of Abkhazia, Georgia.

== History ==
The church is broadly dated to the Middle Ages, but the exact time of its construction is unknown.

The church stands in the center of the village. It is a hall-church design, its walls built of large coarsely processed blocks of local volcanic rock. There is the only entrance, leading into a hall with a small vault leaning against arches. The arches are constructed of the porous volcanic rock. According to local reports, the villagers have found iron crosses and fragments of millstones in the debris of the church. The local Georgian Svan community revered the church as a shrine of St. George. The church was partially restored and continued to be used until 2008, when the local population had to leave the area during the Russo-Georgian War.

There is a second church on the northeast outskirts of the village. At an altitude of about 1600 m above sea level, it is the most highland place of warship on the territory of Abkhazia. Its design is akin to the former church, but it is larger in size. Local limestone volcanic rock is used in its walls and ceiling blocks.
