= Amtkeli =

Amtkeli Amt’q’eli
- Location within Abkhazia Location within Georgia
- Native name: Georgian: ამტყელი

Location
- Country: Georgia, Abkhazia

Physical characteristics
- Source: Caucasus Mountains
  - location: Georgia, Abkhazia
  - coordinates: 43°02′45″N 41°19′28″E
- Mouth: Kodori
  - coordinates: 43°15′21″N 41°17′22″E
- Length: 39 km (24 mi)

Basin features
- Progression: Kodori→ Black Sea

Amtkeli (Georgian: ამტყელი Abkhaz: Амтҟьал) is a small river in north-western Georgia. It originates in the Caucasus Mountains, in the region of Upper Abkhazia, in the western part of the Chkhalta range near Amtkeli pass. It flows south to Lake Amtkeli and joins the Kodori River. Its catchment area is 398 square kilometres (154 mi^{2}).

The Amtkeli is fed by snow, rain and groundwater. Floods occur in late spring and summer, and the low flows occur in winter.
