= Gagra Range =

Mountain range of the Greater Caucasus in Abkhazia, Georgia

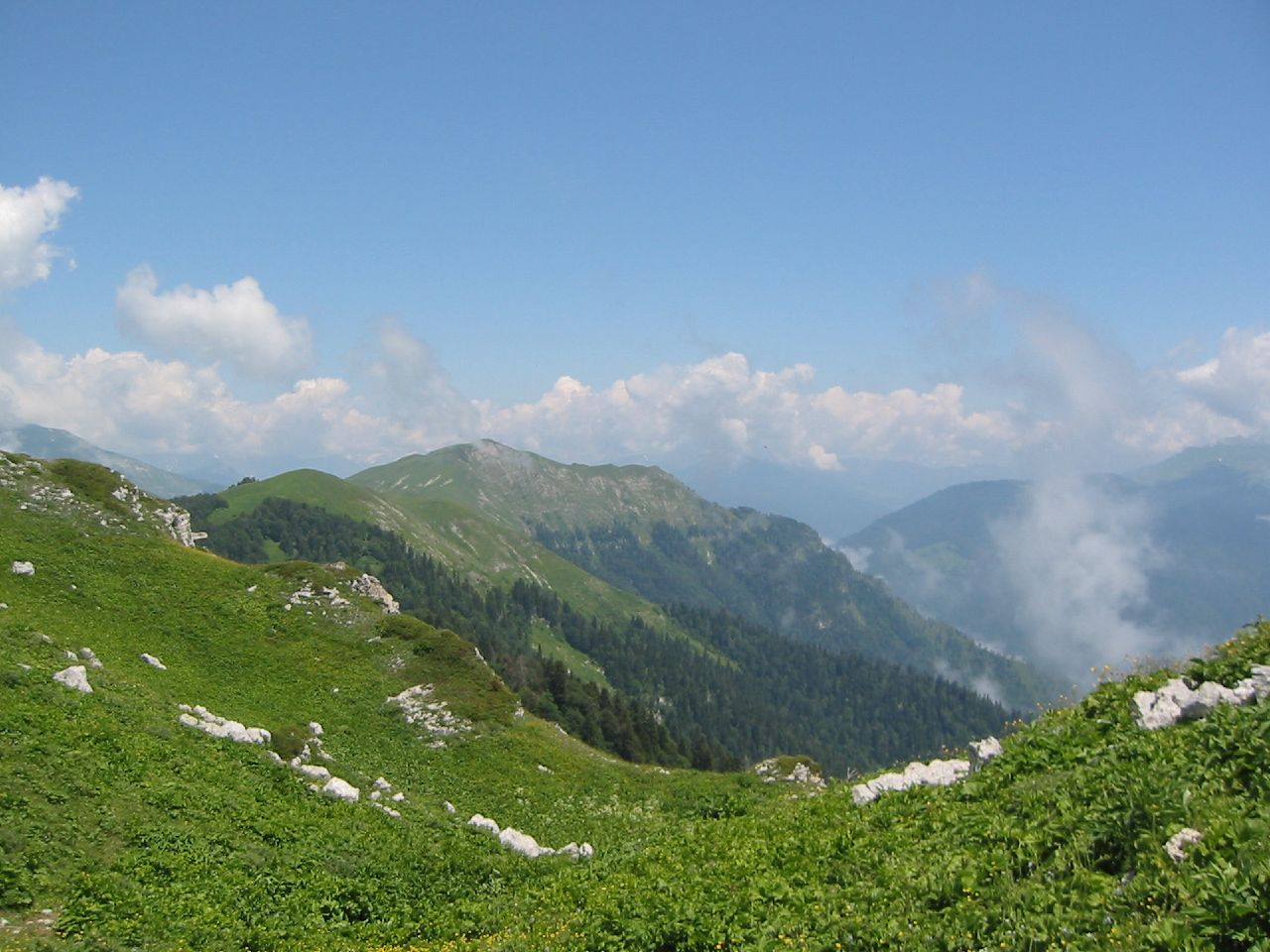
- View of Gagra mountains.

Highest point
- Peak: Mount Agepsta
- Elevation: 3,357 m (11,014 ft)

Dimensions
- Length: 85 km (53 mi)

Geography
- Location within Abkhazia Location within Georgia
- Country: Georgia
- Region: Abkhazia (Note: The political status of Abkhazia is disputed. Having unilaterally declared independence from Georgia in 1992, Abkhazia is formally recognised as an independent state by 4 UN member states (three other states previously recognised it but then withdrew their recognition), while the remainder of the international community recognizes it as de jure Georgian territory. Georgia continues to claim the area as its own territory, designating it as Russian-occupied territory.)
- Range coordinates: 43°29′54″N 40°12′50″E
- Parent range: Caucasus Mountains

Gagra Range (/ˈɡæɡrə, ˈɡɑː-/; Georgian: გაგრის ქედი, romanized: gagris kedi; Abkhaz: Гагратәи ахықә, romanized: Gagratəi ahyķə; Russian: Гагрский хребет, romanized: Gagrsky khrebet) is a mountain range of the Greater Caucasus in the Republic of Abkhazia. It runs between the valleys of the Bzyb and Psou rivers to the south of the Caucasus Major, in a general North-South direction. The highest elevation is located at Mount Agepsta at 3,357 m (11,014 ft). Geologically, the range is formed of Lower Cretaceous and Upper Jurassic limestone, carved into dramatic karst based landscapes within the Arabika Massif.

== Geography ==
Gagra Range is part of the Greater Caucasus in Abkhazia..It runs between the valleys of the Bzyb and Psou rivers to the south of the Caucasus Major, in a general North-South direction. The range spans 85 km (53 mi), dropping abruptly toward the Black Sea, forming deep valleys along the coast. The range consists of steep slopes, with the highest elevation located at Mount Agepsta at 3,357 m (11,014 ft) along the Abkhazian–Russian border. While the western slopes drop sharply toward the sea, while northeastern foothills are gentler and more vegetated. The Gagra Range approaches the Black Sea close to the city of Gagra and plays an important role in moderating the climate of that resort by blocking cold, continental winds from the north and east.

== Geology ==
The mountain range is composed of limestone from Lower Cretaceous and Upper Jurassic period. These limestone form extensive karst landscapes includes caves, sinkholes, gorges, and subterranean rivers. The mountains host some of the deepest cave systems in earth. The Veryovkina Cave extending up to 2,209 m (7,247 ft) deep, is the deepest-known cave on Earth. It was discovered in 1968 and explored to full depth via vertical exploration systems. The Sarma Cave is the third deepest globally at about 1,830 m (6,000 ft) depth, with documented stygobiont amphipods. These cave systems incorporate numerous water springs, fed by deep cave aquifers formed five to six million years ago, and feed into the sea via the coastal foothills. A highway to Lake Ritsa, the deepest lake in Abkhazia (116 m), runs by the range, along the Bzyb, Iupshara and Gega rivers.

== See also ==
- Bzyb Range
- Kodori Range
- Achibakh Mountain
