= Kelasuri =

River in Georgia

- Location within Gulripshi District Location within Abkhazia Location within Georgia

Location
- Country: Abkhazia-Georgia
- State: Sukhumi district / Gulrypsh district

Physical characteristics
- Source: Kelasuri First / Kelasuri Second
  - location: Caucasus Major
  - coordinates: 43°14′15″N 41°11′46″E
  - elevation: 1,380 m (4,530 ft)
- Mouth: Georgia/Abkhazia
  - location: Black Sea
  - coordinates: 42°58′15″N 41°03′58″E
  - elevation: 0 ft (0 m)
- Length: 42 km (26 mi)
- Basin size: 220 square kilometres (85 mi^{2})
- Discharge
  - average: 13.2 m^{3}/s (470 cu ft/s)

The Kelasuri or Kelasyri, also Kalashir (Georgian: კელასური [Kelasuri], Abkhaz: Kyalashәyr [Kyalashir]) is a river in Abkhazia, Georgia.

The source is located on the glacier Khimsa at Bzyb Range. Kelasuri begins at the merger of Kelasuri First and Kelasuri Second rivers.

The river flows along the administrative border of the Sukhumi and Gulripshi districts.

The river sources are glacial water and rain. Water consumption in early May is about 20 to 25 cubic metres per second (710 to 880 cu ft/s). A significant part of the river bed runs along the gorge. 5 km (3.1 mi) from the center Sukhumi and flows into the Black Sea. It is one of the largest rivers in Abkhazia.
