= Kodori (river) =

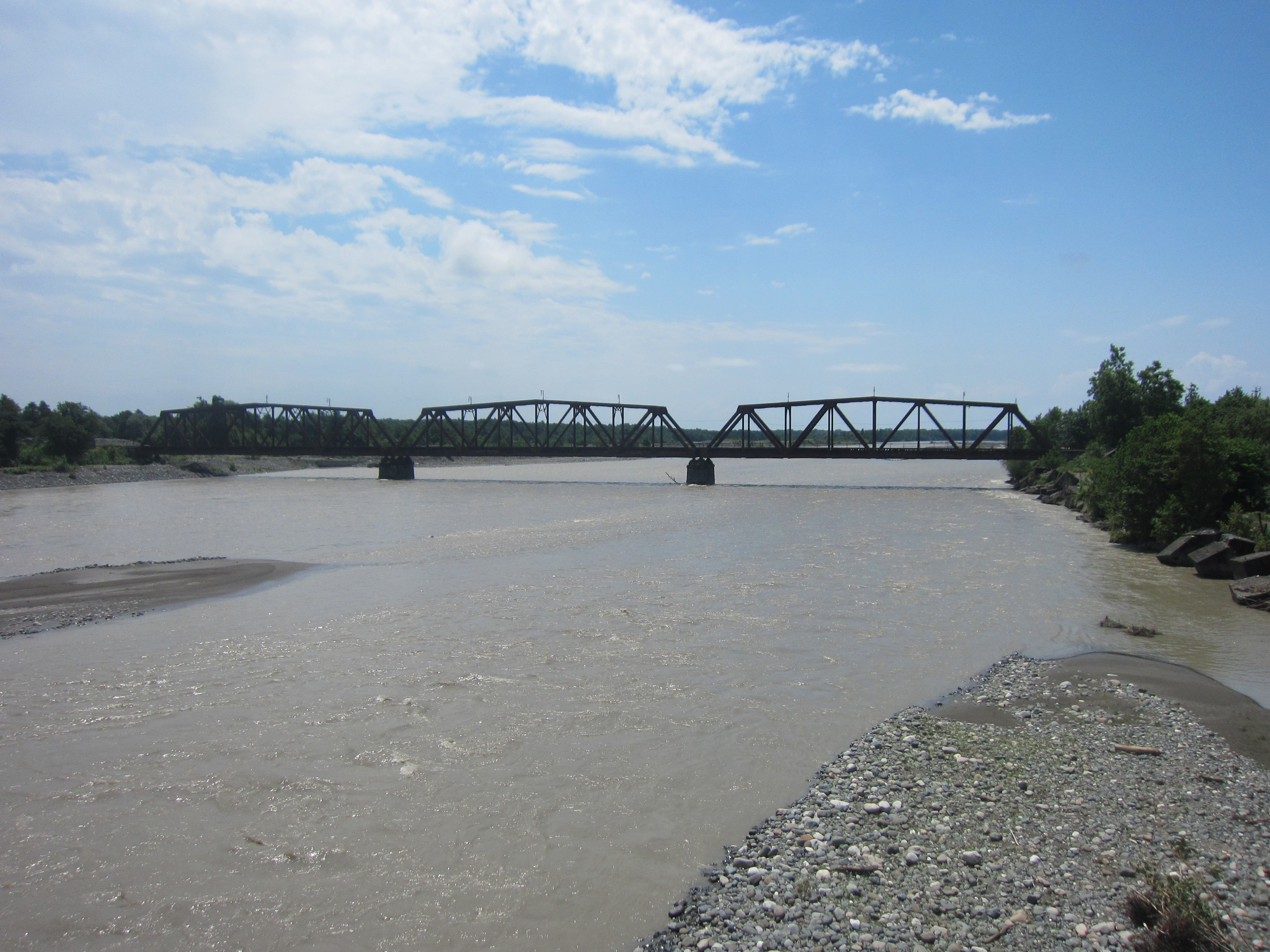

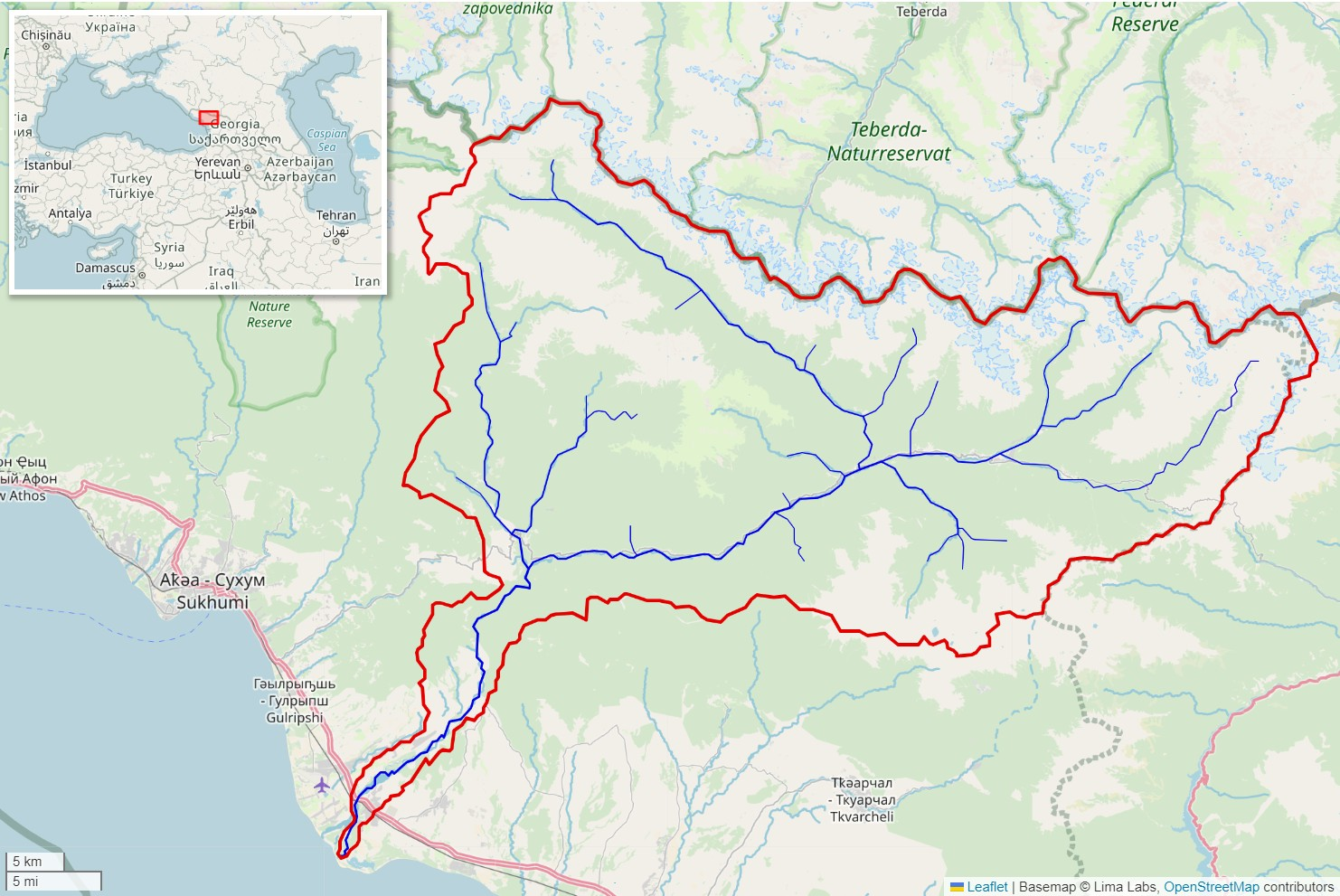
- Kodori River watershed (Interactive map)

Location
- Country: Georgia/Abkhazia

Physical characteristics
- Source: Kelasuri First / Kelasuri Second
  - location: Main Caucasian Range; Caucasus Major
  - elevation: 1,380 m (4,530 ft)
- Mouth: Georgia/Abkhazia
  - location: Black Sea
  - coordinates: 42°49′14″N 41°07′55″E
  - elevation: 0 ft (0 m)
- Length: 105 km (65 mi)
- Basin size: 2,051 square kilometres (792 mi^{2})
- Discharge
  - average: 144 m^{3}/s (5,100 cu ft/s)

The Kodori (Georgian: კოდორი; Abkhaz: Кәыдры, romanized: Kwydry) is one of the two longest rivers of Abkhazia, along with the Bzyb. It is formed by the joining of the rivers Sakeni and Gvandra. The Kodori is first among Abkhazia's rivers with respect to average annual discharge at 144 cubic metres per second (5,100 cu ft/s) and drainage basin area at 2,051 square kilometres (792 mi^{2}). It is second after the Bzyb with respect to length at 105 kilometres (65 mi) when combined with the Sakeni.

== See also ==
- Kodori Valley for the valley through which the Kodori flows.
