= Gagra landing (August 1992) =

Landing at Gagra (1992)
- Part of the War in Abkhazia (1992–1993)
Date	August 15 – August 19, 1992
Location	Gagra district
Result	Georgian victory
Territorial changes	Georgians take control of most of the Gagra district

Belligerents
(Georgia (country)) Georgia	Abkhazia

Commanders and leaders
Badri Pirtskeliani; Maj. Barbakadze; Giorgi Gobronidze	Unknown

Units involved
Georgian National Guard; Mkhedrioni; Local Georgian formations	Abkhaz National Guard

Strength
250 paratroopers 4 armored reconnaissance/patrol vehicles 4 armored troop-carriers	100+ men

Casualties and losses
Unknown	3-8 dead

The Gagra landing was a landing operation undertaken by the Georgian National Guard and Mkhedrioni and associated battle for the Gagra district in the beginning of the 1992–1993 War in Abkhazia. The operation was successful and Georgians took control of the district.

== Georgian landing ==
On 15 August 1992, a day after beginning of the war, a Georgian naval force supported by armed local Georgian formations landed in Gantiadi or Leselidze in the Gagra district near the border with Russia. After securing border, they turned southward to capture the town of Gagra. Georgians utilized aviation to clear Psou-Gagra road and Abkhazians retreated. By 19 August Georgian secured Gagra and Abkhazians retreated to the village of Bzyb. A frontline was formed from the Mamzyshkha Mountain down to Alakhadzi by the sea.

== Abkhaz counteroffensive ==
Securing Gagra district was of critical importance to Georgians to guard the border and prevent Abkhazians from getting any kind of support from Russia and Confederation of Mountain Peoples of the Caucasus. Yet Abkhazs still received some reinforcements through the mountain passes of Gudauta District. On 22-23 August, around 1,000 North Caucasian volunteers arrived to Abkhazia to help separatists. On the night of 24 August 1992, the 1,500 Abkhazian-North Caucasian troops attacked the town of Gagra, which resulted in dozens being killed. The Abkhazs launched an offensive in the area of city of Gagra on Mount Mamzyshkha. On 25 August, the battle was raging on the perimeter of the city of Gagra. The strongest offensive-push was undertaken at 10pm. Georgians managed to hold on offensive despite running low on equipment and ammunition, soon receiving reinforcements from Mkhedrioni. Abkhazs made only small gains. On 30 August, each side accused the other of launching the offensive, with Abkhaz separatist leader Vladislav Ardzinba alleging that Georgians launched offensive in the direction of Bichvinta which was held by Abkhaz forces, reportedly with about 1,000 soldiers and 10 tanks. There was a fighting in a gorge outside the town of Gagra and near the Gumista River. Gagra garrison commander, Badri Pirtskeliani, reported the deaths of 10 Georgians and 20 being wounded by late afternoon. Russian agency reported the deaths of 35 Georgians, while Abkhazian casualties were not reported. In the end, there were no territorial changes as a result of a week of fierce battles.

== Ceasefire ==
On 29 August 1992, Abkhaz separatist leader Vladislav Ardzinba, head of Russia's Committee for Emergencies Sergei Shoigu and Georgian defence minister Tengiz Kitovani met in Sochi and agreed on a ceasefire. The ceasefire was supposed to involve an exchange of prisoners and hostages, dead bodies, as well as joint Georgian-Russian force to guard railroads and key communications. It was supposed to begin on 31 August 1992. Moreover, a meeting was scheduled on 3 September between Russian president Boris Yeltsin, head of Georgia's State Council Eduard Shevardnadze and Vladislav Ardzinba in Moscow. However, the fighting near Gagra continued, killing one and wounding two on Georgian side on 3 September, before the new ceasefire agreement was signed between Yeltsin, Ardzinba and Shevardnadze on 3 September, establishing a joint Abkhaz-Russian-Georgian commission to monitor the truce.

== Ceasefire implementation ==
The 3 September ceasefire agreement established peace but was frequently violated. On 20 September, in the worst incident after the ceasefire agreement, the Abkhazian separatists ambushed a car of Georgian militiamen and mountaineers near Gagra, killing seven and wounding 10. Three Georgian soldiers died in a gun battle near Kolkhida a day before.

In early October, Abkhazians launched another offensive and captured Gagra district.
