= Zemo Khevi =

Zemo Khevi ზემო ხევი (Georgian)
- Village
- Location in Georgia Zemo Khevi (Abkhazia)
- Coordinates: 43°14′30″N 40°19′13″E
- Country: Georgia
- Partially recognized independent country: Abkhazia
- District: Gagra
- Community: Kolkhida
- Elevation: 100 m (330 ft)

Population (1989)
  - Total: 262
- Time zone: UTC+4 (GET)

Zemo Khevi (Georgian: ზემო ხევი) is a village at an altitude of 100 meters ASL, at the southern slope of Gagra Range in the Gagra District of Abkhazia, (Note: The political status of Abkhazia is disputed. Having unilaterally declared independence from Georgia in 1992, Abkhazia is formally recognised as an independent state by 4 UN member states (three other states previously recognised it but then withdrew their recognition), while the remainder of the international community recognizes it as de jure Georgian territory. Georgia continues to claim the area as its own territory, designating it as Russian-occupied territory.) Georgia. Distance to Gagra is 15 km.

== See also ==
- Gagra District

== Literature ==
- Georgian Soviet Encyclopedia, V. 4, p. 512, Tb., 1979.
