= Georgian Gorge =

Georgian Gorge საქართველოს ხეობა (Georgian) Аҳәыҳәшәара (Abkhaz)
- Village
- Location in Georgia Georgian Gorge (Abkhazia)
- Coordinates: 43°17′26″N 40°16′37″E
- Country: Georgia
- Partially recognized independent country: Abkhazia
- District: Gagra
- Community: Kolkhida
- Elevation: 60 m (200 ft)

Population (1989)
  - Total: 518
- Time zone: UTC+4 (GET)

Georgian Gorge (Georgian: საქართველოს ხეობა; Abkhaz: Аҳәыҳәшәара) is a village at an altitude of 60 meters from sea level, at Olginski riverside in the Gagra District of Abkhazia, (Note: The political status of Abkhazia is disputed. Having unilaterally declared independence from Georgia in 1992, Abkhazia is formally recognised as an independent state by 4 UN member states (three other states previously recognised it but then withdrew their recognition), while the remainder of the international community recognizes it as de jure Georgian territory. Georgia continues to claim the area as its own territory, designating it as Russian-occupied territory.) Georgia. Distance to Gagra is 7 km.

== See also ==
- Gagra District

== Literature ==
- Georgian Soviet Encyclopedia, V. 9, p. 189, Tb., 1985.
