= Kultubani =

Kultubani კულტუბანი Асабулеи Asabulei
- Village
- Location in Georgia Kultubani (Georgia)
- Coordinates: 43°24′17″N 40°01′56″E
- Country: Georgia
- Occupied by: Abkhazia
- District: Gagra
- Elevation: 100 m (330 ft)

Population (1989)
  - Total: 866
- Time zone: UTC+3 (MSK)
  - Summer (DST): UTC+4

Kultubani (Georgian: კულტუბანი; Abkhaz: Асабулеи, Asabulei) is a village in Abkhazia, Georgia. (Note: The political status of Abkhazia is disputed. Having unilaterally declared independence from Georgia in 1992, Abkhazia is formally recognised as an independent state by 4 UN member states (three other states previously recognised it but then withdrew their recognition), while the remainder of the international community recognizes it as de jure Georgian territory. Georgia continues to claim the area as its own territory, designating it as Russian-occupied territory.)
