= Alpuri (village) =

Alpuri ალპური (Georgian)
- Village
- Location in Georgia Alpuri (Abkhazia)
- Coordinates: 43°17′1″N 40°16′48″E
- Country: Georgia
- Partially recognized independent country: Abkhazia
- District: Gagra
- Community: Kolkhida
- Elevation: 100 m (330 ft)

Population (1989)
  - Total: 278
- Time zone: UTC+4 (GET)

Alpuri (Georgian: ალპური) is a village at an altitude of 100 meters above sea level in the Gagra District of Abkhazia, (Note: The political status of Abkhazia is disputed. Having unilaterally declared independence from Georgia in 1992, Abkhazia is formally recognised as an independent state by 4 UN member states (three other states previously recognised it but then withdrew their recognition), while the remainder of the international community recognizes it as de jure Georgian territory. Georgia continues to claim the area as its own territory, designating it as Russian-occupied territory.) Georgia. It is roughly 2 kilometres from Gagra.

== See also ==
- Gagra District

== Literature ==
- Georgian Soviet Encyclopedia, V. 1, p. 325, Tb., 1975.
