= Battle of Gagra (October 1992) =

1992 battle of the Georgian-Abkhazian War

Coordinates: 43°20′N 40°13′E

- Part of War in Abkhazia
Date	1–6 October 1992
Location	Gagra, Abkhazia, Georgia
Result	Abkhazian victory
Territorial changes	Abkhazians separatists capture Gagra District

Belligerents
Abkhazia; CMPC	Georgia

Commanders and leaders
Shamil Basayev; Ruslan Gelayev; Sergei Matosyan	Giorgi Karkarashvili

Units involved
Abkhaz National Guard; Cossack units Bagramyan Battalion	13th "Shavnabada" Light Infantry Battalion "Orbi" (lit. 'griffin') "White Eagles" special units

Strength
3,000–4,000	Hundreds

Casualties and losses
117 killed (Abkhaz claim)	42 killed, 47 captured (Georgian claim); 300 killed (Russian claim)
- 429 Georgian civilians (Georgian claim)

The Battle of Gagra, or Operation Storm was fought between Georgian forces and the Abkhaz secessionists aided by the Confederation of Mountain Peoples of the Caucasus (CMPC) militants from 1 to 6 October 1992, during the War in Abkhazia. The allies, commanded by the Chechen warlord Shamil Basayev, captured the town of Gagra from the undermanned Georgian forces (which were reportedly fewer in numbers but possessed more tanks and armoured personnel carriers) in a surprise attack, leading to an outbreak of ethnic cleansing of local Georgian population. The battle proved to be one of the bloodiest in the war and is widely considered to be a turning point in the Georgian-Abkhaz conflict. The action, in which Russian commanders were suspected to have aided to the attackers, also resulted in a significant deterioration of the Georgian-Russian relations.

== Background ==
During the Russian Empire and Soviet Union, Gagra was a prominent Black Sea resort town in the northwest of Abkhazia, near the international border between Georgia and the Russian Federation. Georgian forces took control of the town from the Abkhaz separatist militia in an August 1992 amphibious operation; part of the Georgian government forces’ attempts to push its offensive southward against the rebel-held enclave around Gudauta, where the Abkhaz secessionist leadership had taken refuge after Georgian troops had entered the regional capital of Sukhumi. Gudauta was also home to a Soviet-era Russian military base, consisting of the 643rd anti-aircraft missile regiment and a supply unit, which were used to funnel arms to the Abkhaz. After an initial military setback, Abkhaz leaders urged Moscow and the Confederation of Mountain Peoples of the Caucasus to intervene in the conflict. The Confederation responded by declaring war on Georgia and sent hundreds of its fighters to aid the Abkhaz side. Meanwhile, the Russian government arranged on 3 September 1992 a truce which left the Georgian government in control of most of Abkhazia, but obliged it to withdraw a large part of its troops and hardware from Gagra and its environs. The conflicting sides resumed the negotiations concerning Abkhazia’s status within Georgia, whose inviolable territorial integrity was emphasized in the ceasefire agreement.

== Assault on Gagra ==
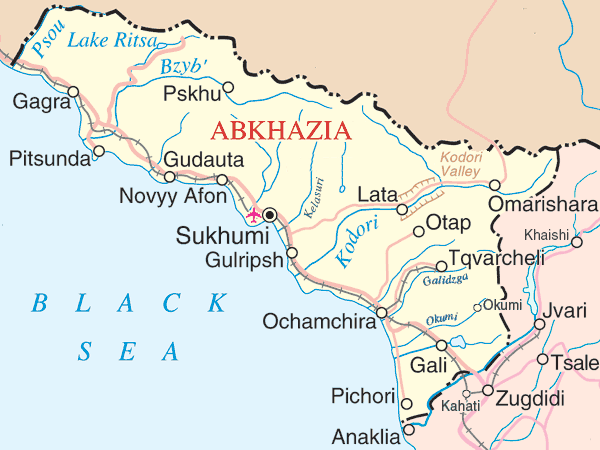
Map of Abkhazia

The truce was not to last long, however. Shortly thereafter, the Abkhaz side declared that the Georgian government had failed to complete the withdrawal of its troops from the Gagra zone. However, according to Russian Army Lieutenant General Sufiyan Bepayev, deputy commander of the Transcaucasian Military District, the Georgians had complied with the 3 September accords and by 30 September had withdrawn 1,200 troops and their corresponding equipment from the area.

On 1 October the Abkhaz forces attacked and captured Psakhara, one week after the Supreme Soviet of Russia had passed a motion condemning Georgia’s policy in Abkhazia and demanding Russian peacekeepers. The combined Abkhaz and North Caucasian forces resumed hostilities and launched a major offensive against Gagra. They were commanded by the then little-known Chechen warlord Shamil Basayev, (Note: Reports on how Basayev arrived in Abkhazia are conflicting. He received personal orders from Yusuf Soslambekov, head of the Parliament of the CMPC, to lead a volunteer battalion into Abkhazia. Georgian officials claimed that the Russian security services sent buses to the Chechen capital Grozny to transport Basayev, Ruslan Gelayev and others to the Georgian-Abkhaz conflict zone. However, Basayev and dozens of his fighters are known to have left Chechnya on their own car caravan. They did commandeer a Russian passenger bus to Karachay-Cherkessia, where the passengers were freed after the local police (militsiya) allegedly received orders from a higher authority to abandon the chase so Basayev and his men could go on to Abkhazia.) who had been appointed Deputy Minister of Defense in the Abkhaz secessionist government and put in charge of the Gagra front. The offensive included T-72 tanks, Grad rocket launchers, and other heavy equipment that the Abkhaz had not previously possessed. The allies were aided by combat helicopters and Su-25 bombers. The type and quantity of equipment that helped advance the Abkhaz offensive was the first and primary cause of Georgian suspicions of Russian assistance to the secessionists. Russian border guards were accused of at least not preventing the North Caucasian militants from crossing into Abkhazia. The Georgian side also accused the Russians of assisting the attackers by imposing a naval blockade of the coastline, in addition to claiming that Deputy Minister of Defense of the Russian Federation G. Kolesnikov was directly responsible for planning the operation.

The Georgian Shavnabada Battalion was caught by surprise, losing almost all of its parked heavy vehicles, but managed to build up a defensive line at the southwestern edges to the city and the beach site. Artillery batteries, which had been already placed on the southern heights prior to the battle, had good line of sight on the town and its surroundings. The Abkhaz-North Caucasian alliance advanced with full force toward the city center in an attempt to overwhelm the defenders by sheer manpower. The initial assault was met with heavy resistance and shelling. Georgian soldiers and artillery in particular dealt heavy losses to the attackers and forced them to retreat. The Shavnabada Battalion, along with a platoon of mixed special forces units, mounted a counterattack and made the alliance forces disperse and rout into the northeastern forests. The Abkhaz-North Caucasian combatants' fighting morale was at the edge of collapse and a large number of them started to disband. However, the alliance re-consolidated its forces, gathered sufficient numbers, and mounted another massive offensive. With most equipment already lost in the surprise attack, Georgian forces ran out of options and considered abandoning Gagra the next day. Special forces leader Gocha Karkarashvili, younger brother of overall commander Giorgi Karkarashvili, insisted on remaining in town with a number of men in order to halt the attackers until reinforcements arrived, despite the remoteness of this possibility. He and a small number of commandos and armed Georgian civilians entrenched themselves in the police and railway stations. The outnumbered Georgians were able to defend these two positions for a while until they were completely surrounded and overrun. The Abkhazians identified 11 members of the elite unit White Eagles, including its leader. Most of the aiding militias were captured. The 13th Battalion and special forces elements became entangled in a losing fight with a second large group of combatants approaching from the nearby forests which led to a full retreat. As it became apparent that Georgian forces were abandoning Gagra completely due to internal rivalries intensifying in Georgia's capital, thousands of Georgian civilians fled to the villages of Gantiadi and Leselidze immediately north of the town. In the days that followed these villages also fell, adding to the flight of refugees to the Russian border. Russian border guards allowed some Georgian civilians and military personnel to cross the border and then transported them to Georgia proper. According to some sources, the elder Karkarashvili and some of his men were also evacuated by helicopter to Russian territory.

Those Georgians who remained in Gagra and the surrounding villages were subjected to a reprisal campaign by Abkhaz forces, many of whom were refugees who had fled Georgian forces earlier and sought revenge for what they themselves had been forced to endure. Official Georgian sources put 429 as the number of civilians who were killed during the battle or in its immediate aftermath. Mikheil Jincharadze, an influential Georgian politician from Gagra who served as Deputy Chairman of Supreme Council of Abkhazia, was captured in his house and executed at the mercy of his Abkhazian friends on October 2, 1992, another victim that was presumably executed that day was Zviad Nadareishvili, who was the Head of Administration Unit of Gagra, while the town itself fell on the same day.

My husband Sergo was dragged and tightened to the tree. An Abkhaz woman named Zoya Tsvizba brought a tray with much salt on it. She took the knife and started to inflict wounds on my husband. Afterwards, she threw handful of salt onto my husband's exposed wounds. They tortured him like that for ten minutes. Afterwards, they forced a young Georgian boy (they killed him after) to dig a hole with the tractor. They placed my husband in this hole and buried him alive. The only thing I remember him saying before he was covered with the gravel and sand was: “Dali take care of the kids!

The battle of Gagra triggered the first allegations of Russian aid to the separatists and marked the beginning of a rapid worsening of Georgia’s relations with Russia. By the end of October, the head of the Georgian government, Eduard Shevardnadze, had halted talks on the Russian mediation, declaring that because of Russia’s "undisguised interference, including military interference... in the internal affairs of sovereign Georgia, we have no other choice."

The fighting around Gagra continued until 6 October 1992. After the capture of Gagra, the Abkhaz-CMPC forces quickly gained control of the strategic area along the Russian border and made steady progress down the coast from Gagra to the Gumista River northwest of Sukhumi, placing the regional capital itself at risk.

Georgian refugees fled to Russia through the land border or were evacuated by the Russian navy.
