= Battle of Gagra =

The Battle of Gagra may also refer to:

- Battle of Gagra (1919)
- Gagra landing (August 1992)
- Battle of Gagra (October 1992)
