= Aibga =

Aibga or Aibgha may refer to:

- Aibga (village), a village between the border of Abkhazia (internationally recognized as part of Georgia) and Russia, subject to a territorial dispute
- Aibga Ridge, a mountain ridge controlled by Russia, also disputed between Russia and Georgia and Abkhazia
