= Bzyb (village) =

Settlement in Abkhazia, Georgia

Bzyb ბზიფი (Georgian) Бзыԥ (Abkhaz)
- Urban-type settlement and municipality
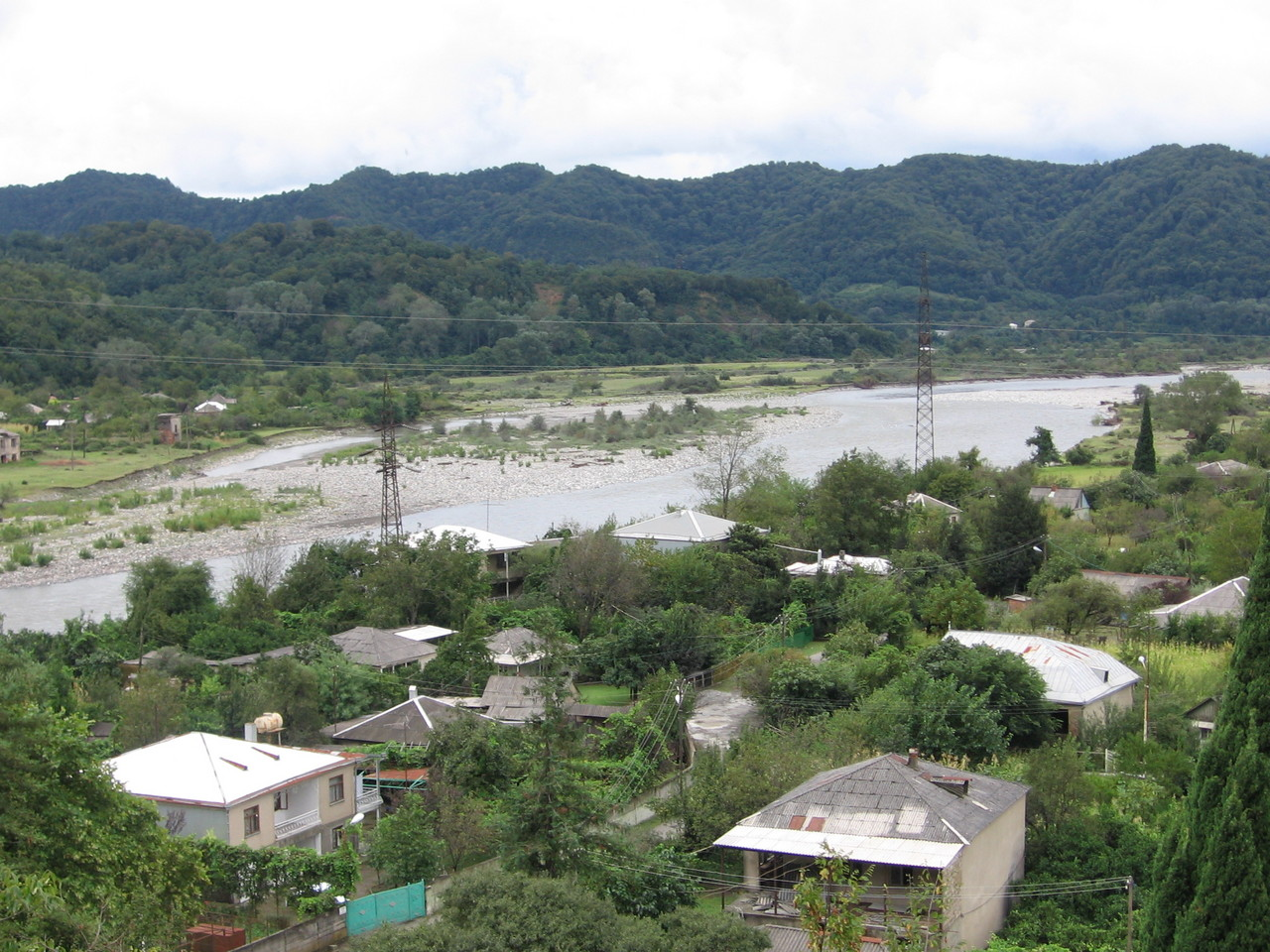

- Location in Abkhazia

- Location in Georgia Location in Abkhazia
- Coordinates: 43°13′45″N 40°22′13″E
- Country: Georgia
- Partially recognized independent country: Abkhazia (Note: The political status of Abkhazia is disputed. Having unilaterally declared independence from Georgia in 1992, Abkhazia is formally recognised as an independent state by 4 UN member states (three other states previously recognised it but then withdrew their recognition), while the remainder of the international community recognizes it as de jure Georgian territory. Georgia continues to claim the area as its own territory, designating it as Russian-occupied territory.)
- District: Gagra

Government
  - Mayor: Tamaz Leiba (Note: "Администрация городов, сёл и посёлков Гагрского района". Gagra DistrictAdministration.)
  - Deputy Mayor: Alla Grigolia

Population (2011)
  - Total: 4,719
- Time zone: UTC+3 (MSK)
- Climate: Cfa

Bzyb or Bzipi (Georgian: ბზიფი, Bzipi, Abkhaz: Бзыԥ, Bzyph, Russian: Бзыбь or Бзыпта) is an urban-type settlement located in the Gagra District of Abkhazia, Georgia. Next to the river Bzyb. There is a 9th or 10th-century church, now in ruins and a medieval fortress nearby. The town became less important when the fortress was destroyed and the town passed into the control of the clan of Inal-Ipa, which perhaps branched off around 1730 from Abkhazia's princely house, the Shervashidze.

== Demographics ==
At the time of the 2011 Census, Bzyb had a population of 4,719. Of these, 54.7% were Abkhaz, 27.5% Armenians, 10.7% Russians, 3.7% Georgians, 0.9% Ukrainians and 0.3% Greeks

== See also ==
- Gagra District
