= Aibga (village) =

Aibga აიბღა (Georgian) А́ибӷа (Abkhaz)
- Village
- Location in Georgia Aibga (Abkhazia)
- Coordinates: 43°35′10″N 40°11′55″E
- Country: Georgia
- Partially recognized independent country: Abkhazia
- District: Gagra
- Elevation: 840 m (2,760 ft)

Population (2011)
  - Total: 26
- Time zone: UTC+4 (GET)

Aibga (Georgian: აიბღა [aibɣa]; Abkhaz: А́ибӷа; Russian: Аибга) is a village straddling the border between Abkhazia/Georgia and Russia.

== Geography ==
The village is located on both banks of the river Psou, at an altitude of 840 meters above sea level. The State border divides the village into two parts.

== Population ==
According to the deputy of Abkhazia's de facto parliament Valery Kvarchia "in summer the village inhabited by 26 people, but in winter there remains few, only the most courageous and strong".

== See also ==
- Gagra District
