= Giorgi Gogiashvili =

Georgian footballer

Giorgi Gogiashvili Георгий Гогиашвили
Personal information
- Full name: Giorgi Demurovich Gogiashvili
- Date of birth: 7 January 1971 (age 55)
- Place of birth: Leselidze, Georgian SSR
- Height: 1.76 m (5 ft 9 1/2 in)
- Positions: Midfielder; striker

Senior career*
Years	Team	Apps	(Gls)
1990	Sikharuli-90 Gagra	38	(22)
1991–1993	Tskhumi Sokhumi	82	(30)
1993–1996	Samtredia	76	(17)
1996–1999	Zhemchuzhina Sochi	110	(14)
1999–2000	Torpedo Kutaisi	24	(2)
2000	Kolkheti-1913 Poti	6	(0)
2001	Hapoel Tzafririm Holon	3	(0)
2001–2002	Zhemchuzhina Sochi	41	(11)
2002–2004	Neftyanik Ufa	80	(39)
2005–2006	Vostok	51	(39)
2007	Kaisar	17	(11)
- * Club domestic league appearances and goals

Giorgi Demurovich Gogiashvili (Russian: Георгий Демурович Гогиашвили; born 7 January 1971) is a former Georgian professional footballer. He also holds Russian citizenship.

== Club career ==
Giorgi debuted professionally in the Pirveli Liga for FC Sikharuli-90 Gagra in 1992. He made his Russian Premier League debut for FC Zhemchuzhina Sochi on 17 July 1996 in a game against FC Krylia Sovetov Samara and spent four seasons in the RPL with the club.

== Honours ==
- Umaglesi Liga runner-up: 1992, 1995.
