= Leselidze (town) =

Town in Abkhazia, Georgia

Leselidze ლესელიძე (Georgian) Гьачрыԥшь (Abkhaz) Լեսելիձե (Armenian) Gyachrypsh
- Town (and municipality)

- Location in Georgia Leselidze (Abkhazia)
- Coordinates: 43°23′N 40°01′E
- Country: Georgia
- De facto state: Abkhazia (Note: The political status of Abkhazia is disputed. Having unilaterally declared independence from Georgia in 1992, Abkhazia is formally recognised as an independent state by 4 UN member states (three other states previously recognised it but then withdrew their recognition), while the remainder of the international community recognizes it as de jure Georgian territory. Georgia continues to claim the area as its own territory, designating it as Russian-occupied territory.)
- District: Gagra

Government
  - Mayor: Roman Rabaia (Note: "Администрация городов, сёл и посёлков Гагрского района". Gagra DistrictAdministration.)
  - Deputy Mayor: Roman Kharabua
- Time zone: UTC+3 (MSK)

Historical population
Year	Pop.
1959	646
1989	969
2011	1,546

Leselidze (Georgian: ლესელიძე, Leselidze; Armenian: Լեսելիձե; Russian: Леселидзе) or Gyachrypsh (Abkhaz: Гьачрыԥшь, G'achryphsh; Russian: Гячрыпш) is a town in Abkhazia. Formerly named Yermolovsk, the town is located on the shores of the Black Sea and is 14 kilometers from the city of Gagra.

== History ==
The town was founded in the 19th century as the settlement Yermolovsk (Russian: Ермоловск), named in honor of the Minister of Agriculture A.S. Yermolov who traveled to this place in 1894. Some authors linked the name of the settlement to General Yermolov (commander of the Caucasian war), but this presumption is apparently erroneous.

In 1944 the town was officially renamed in honor of the national hero Colonel-General Konstantin Leselidze (1903-1944) who fought in the Caucasus during World War II. In the post-war years the town saw a lot of improvements, it was developed as a vacation site. A children's sanatorium was built as well as a resort and a sports training base. The base was favored by top Soviet athletes. Soviet Union national football (soccer) team and other Soviet football clubs trained there as well as handball players and track-and-field athletes.

In 1975 a monument (created by Silovan Kakabadze) of Konstantin Leselidze was erected in the town. In September 1992, after the fall of Gagra during the 1992–1993 war in Abkhazia, Abkhazian troops destroyed the monument along with other Georgian landmarks.

In 1992, the town was renamed Gyachrypsh by the unrecognized Abkhazian authorities. The name “Gyachrypsh” originated from the territory which was ruled by the Abkhazian prince named Gech or Gechkuaj. In historical literature there is a variation: “Gechiler” (Circassian “Gech-chiler”).

In his book My War, Chechen diary of a trench General, Russian general Gennady Troshev accused Shamil Basayev of perpetrating war crimes in the area around Leselidze in the aftermath of the 1992–1993 war:

“The trademark of Basayev’s 'janissaries' (numbering around 5000) in that war was senseless cruelty. In autumn of 1993 in the vicinity of Gagra and the town Lеselidze 'the commander' personally led a punitive action for the extermination of refugees. Several thousand Georgians were killed, hundreds of Armenian, Russian and Greek families slaughtered. According to the accounts of miraculously survived eyewitnesses, the bandits took pleasure in videotaping the scenes of abuse and rape.”

Under Abkhazian control the town is known to feature two all-inclusive resorts - "Gech" and "Laguna".

== Demographics ==
In 1959, Leselidze was principally inhabited by Russians, Armenians, and Estonians.

== See also ==
- Gagra District
- Giorgi Gogiashvili
