= Gantiadi =

Settlement in Abkhazia, Georgia

Gantiadi განთიადი (Georgian) Цандрыԥшь (Abkhaz) Tsandrypsh
- Urban-type settlement
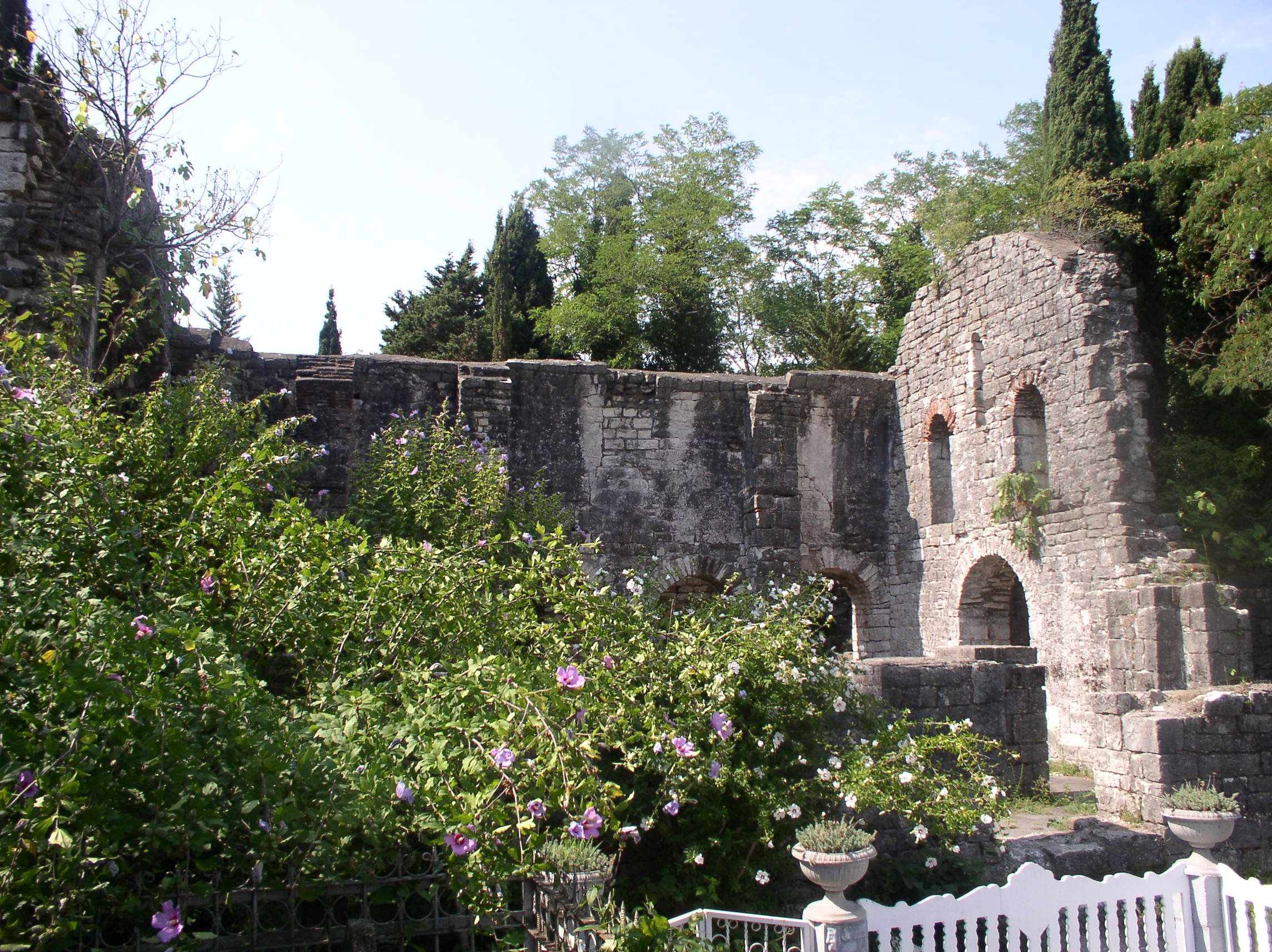
- Basilica in Gantiadi (6th century AD)

- Location in Abkhazia

- Location in Georgia Gantiadi (Abkhazia)
- Coordinates: 43°22′N 40°05′E
- Country: Georgia
- Partially recognized independent country: Abkhazia (Note: The political status of Abkhazia is disputed. Having unilaterally declared independence from Georgia in 1992, Abkhazia is formally recognised as an independent state by 4 UN member states (three other states previously recognised it but then withdrew their recognition), while the remainder of the international community recognizes it as de jure Georgian territory. Georgia continues to claim the area as its own territory, designating it as Russian-occupied territory.)
- District: Gagra

Government
  - Mayor: Albert Tarkil
  - First Deputy Mayor: Karapet Karagozyan
  - Second Deputy Mayor: Grigori Kasparyan

Population (2011)
  - Total: 5,170
- Time zone: UTC+3 (MSK)
- Climate: Cfa

Gantiadi (Georgian: განთიადი [ɡantʰiadi]; Russian: Гантиади), or Tsandrypsh (Abkhaz: Цандрыԥшь; Russian: Цандрыпш), is an urban-type settlement on the Black Sea coast in Georgia, in the Gagra District of Abkhazia, 5 km from the Russian border.

== Name ==
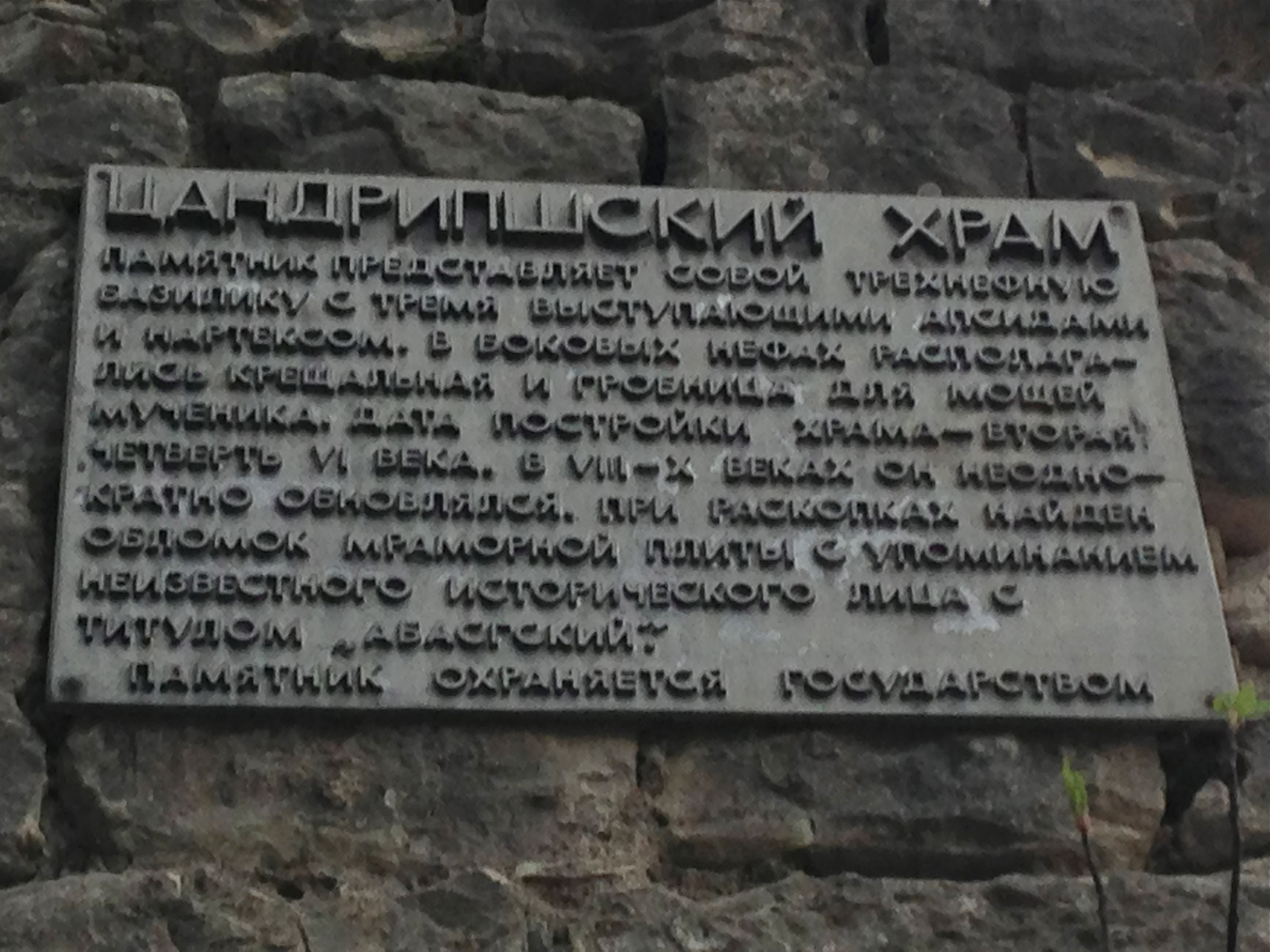
Basilica

Gantiadi in historical times, was known as Sauchi (Russian: Саучи). Then, until 1944 as Yermolov, after the Russian general Aleksey Petrovich Yermolov. From 1944 until 1991, the settlement was known as Gantiadi (Georgian: განთიადი, Russian: Гантиади), from the Georgian word for Dawn. After the 1992-93 war in Abkhazia, Gantiadi was renamed as Tsandrypsh by the de facto government, but the name Gantiadi is still used informally among Abkhazians and widely in other languages. The name Tsandrypsh derives from the princely family Tsanba.

== History ==
Gantiadi is said to have been the historical capital of the principality of Saniga before the 6th century AD. It later became the capital of Sadzen.

== Demographics ==
In 2011, Gantiadi had a population of 5,170. Of these, 55.9% were Armenians, 19.6% Abkhaz, 18.4% Russians, 1.2% Ukrainians, 0.9% Georgians and 0.7% Greeks.

== Main sights ==
Tsandrypsh houses a 6th-century Georgian Christian church. A personal residence of Joseph Stalin is also located here.

== See also ==
- Gagra District
