= Psakhara =

Psakhara კოლხიდა (Georgian) Ԥсахара (Abkhaz) Kolkhida
- Village (and municipality)
- Location in Abkhazia Psakhara (Georgia)
- Coordinates: 43°15′10″N 40°17′45″E
- Country: Georgia
- Occupied by: Abkhazia
- District: Gagra

Government
  - Mayor: Akhra Abijba (Note: "Администрация городов, сёл и посёлков Гагрского района". Gagra District Administration.)
  - Deputy Mayor: Beslan Dziapshipa
- Elevation: 20 m (66 ft)

Population (1989)
  - Total: 3,102
- Time zone: UTC+3 (MSK)

Psakhara or Kolkhida (Georgian: კოლხიდა, Kʼolkhida; Abkhaz: Ԥсахара, Phsachara) is a village at an altitude of 20 meters from sea level in the Gagra District of Abkhazia. (Note: The political status of Abkhazia is disputed. Having unilaterally declared independence from Georgia in 1992, Abkhazia is formally recognised as an independent state by 4 UN member states (three other states previously recognised it but then withdrew their recognition), while the remainder of the international community recognizes it as de jure Georgian territory. Georgia continues to claim the area as its own territory, designating it as Russian-occupied territory.) Official status of urban-type settlement was received in 1982.

== See also ==
- Gagra District

== Literature ==
- Georgian Soviet Encyclopedia
