= Gagra District =

Gagra District გაგრის რაიონი Гагра араион Гагрский район
- District
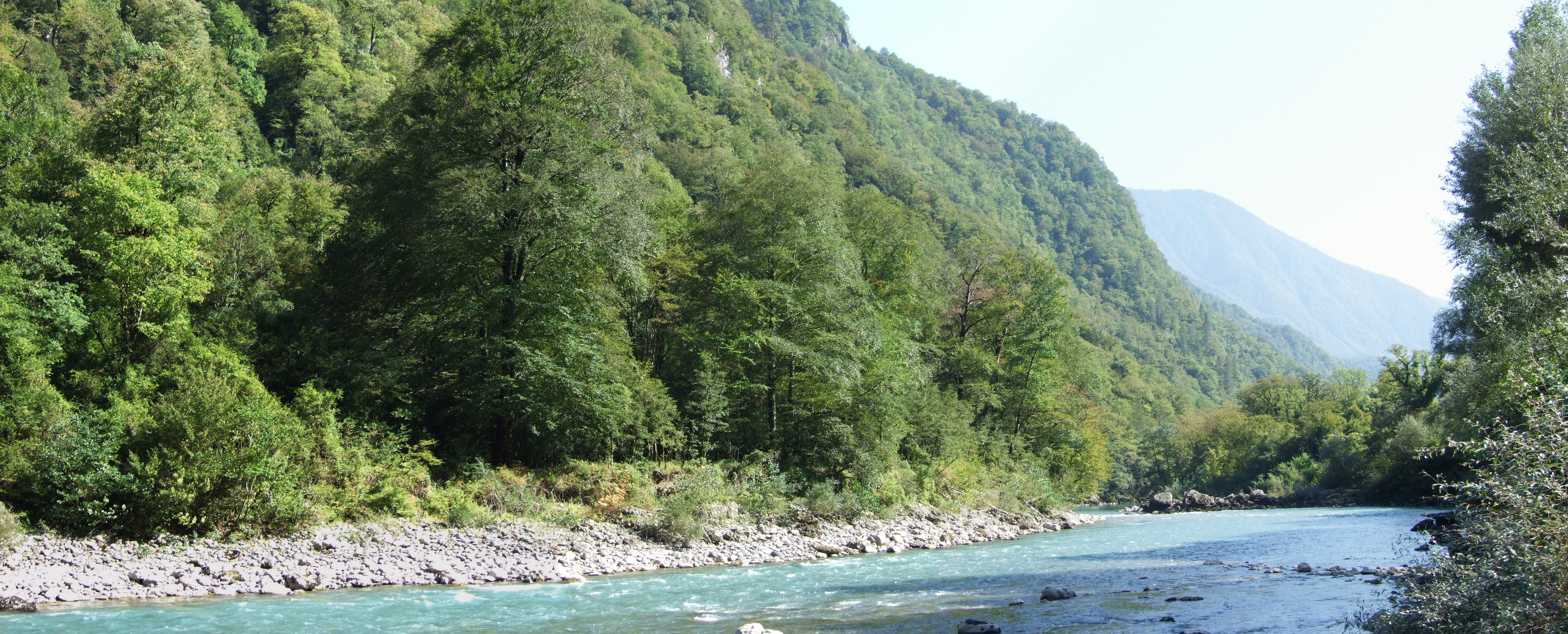
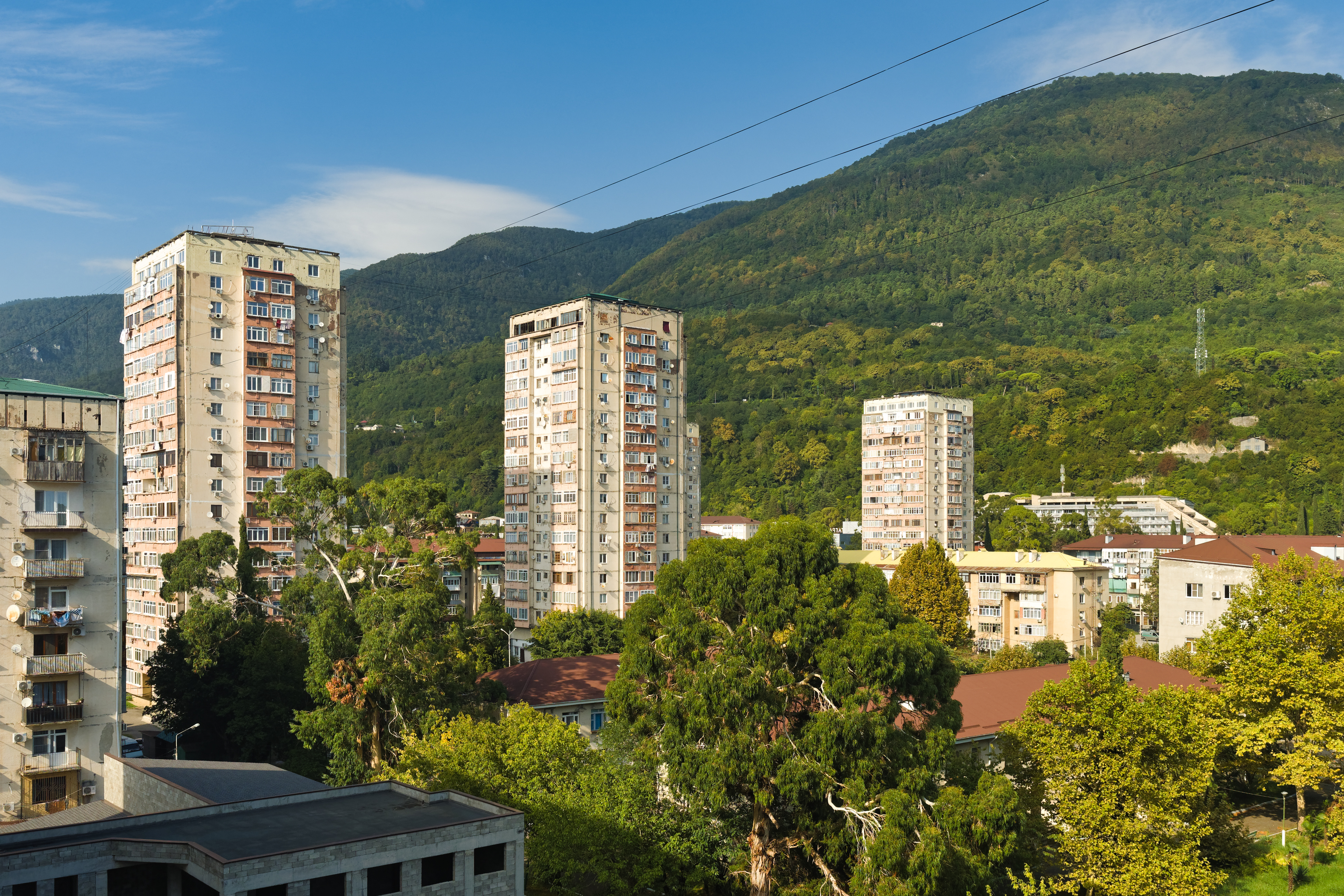
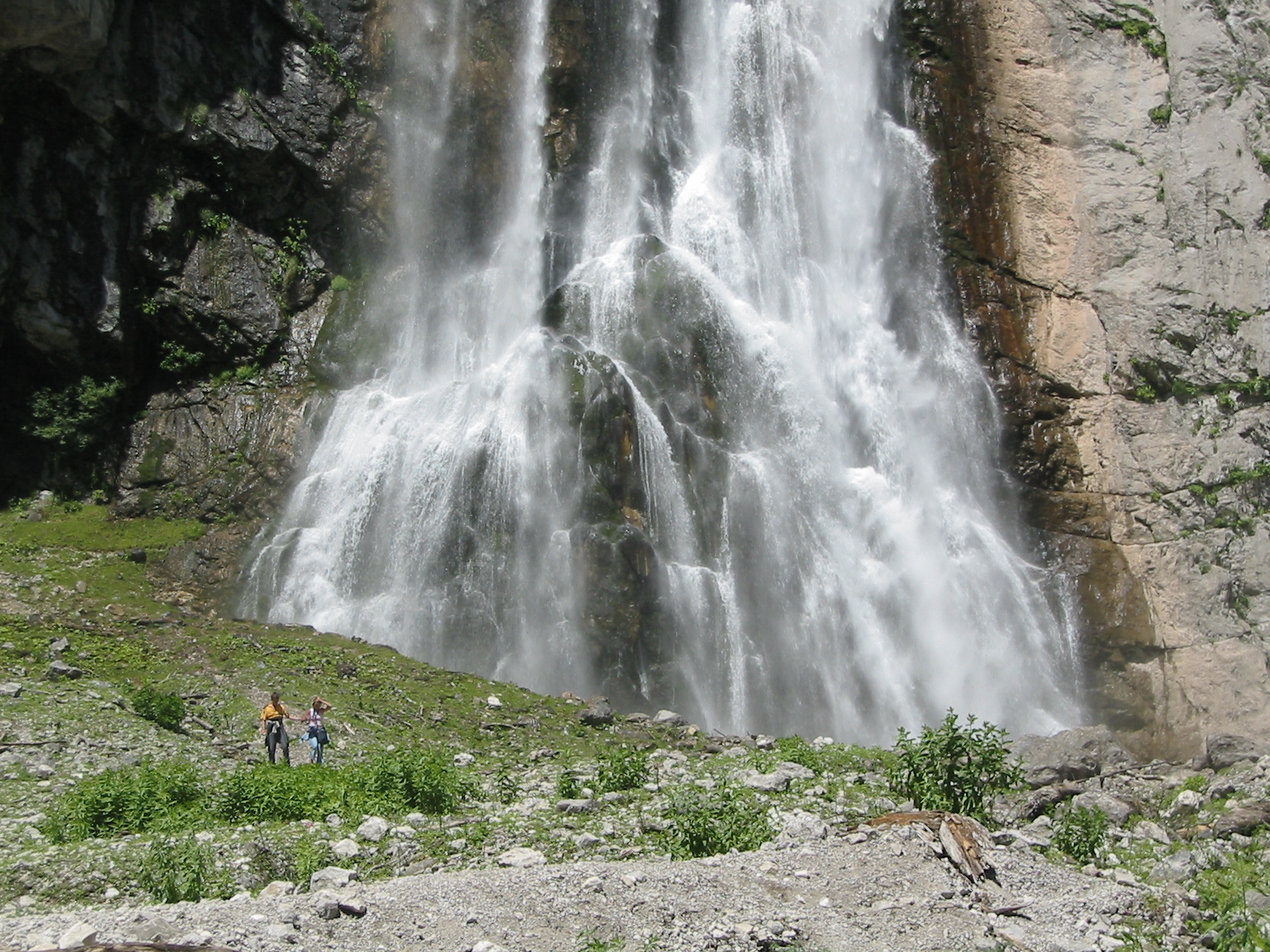
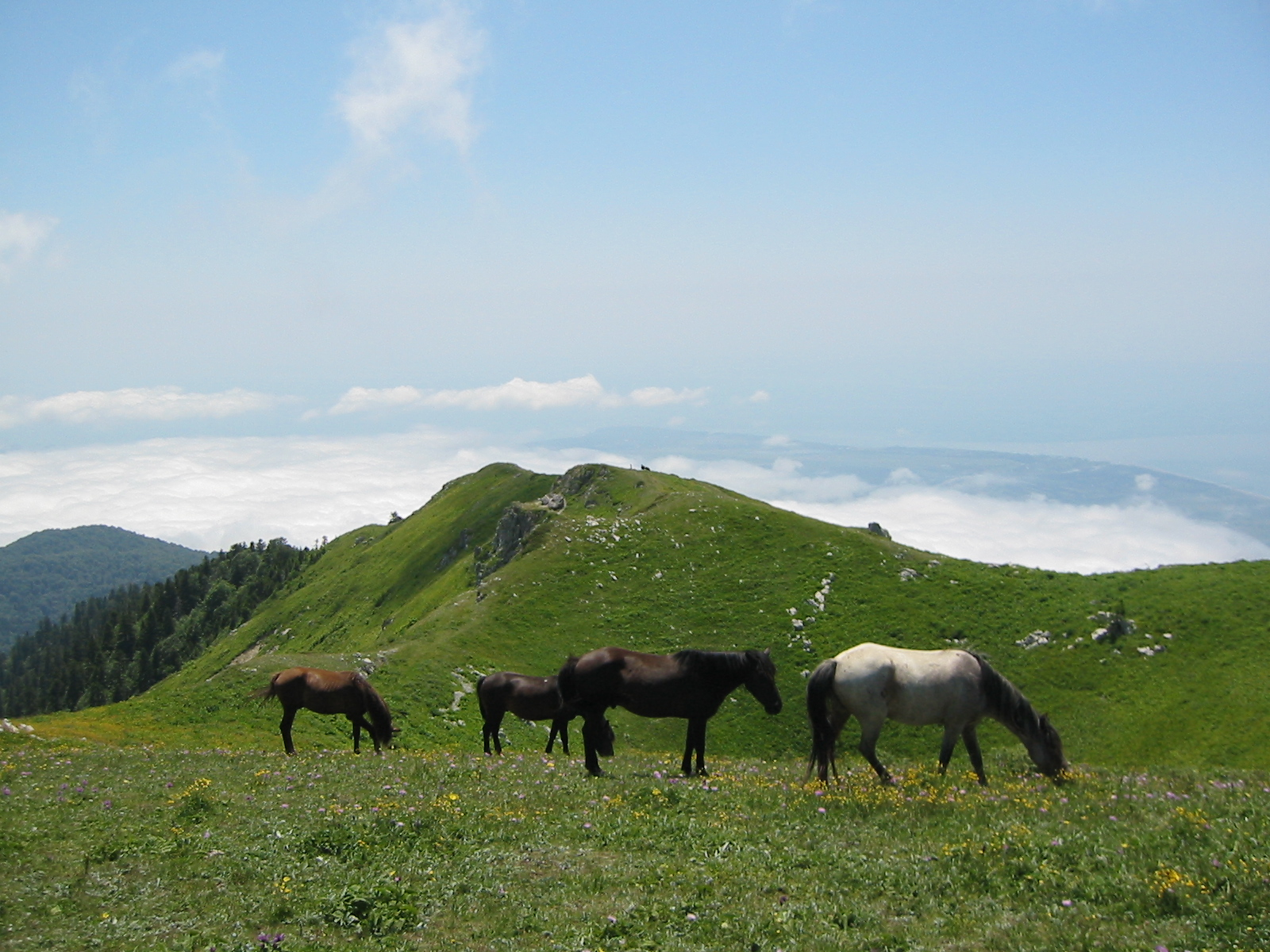
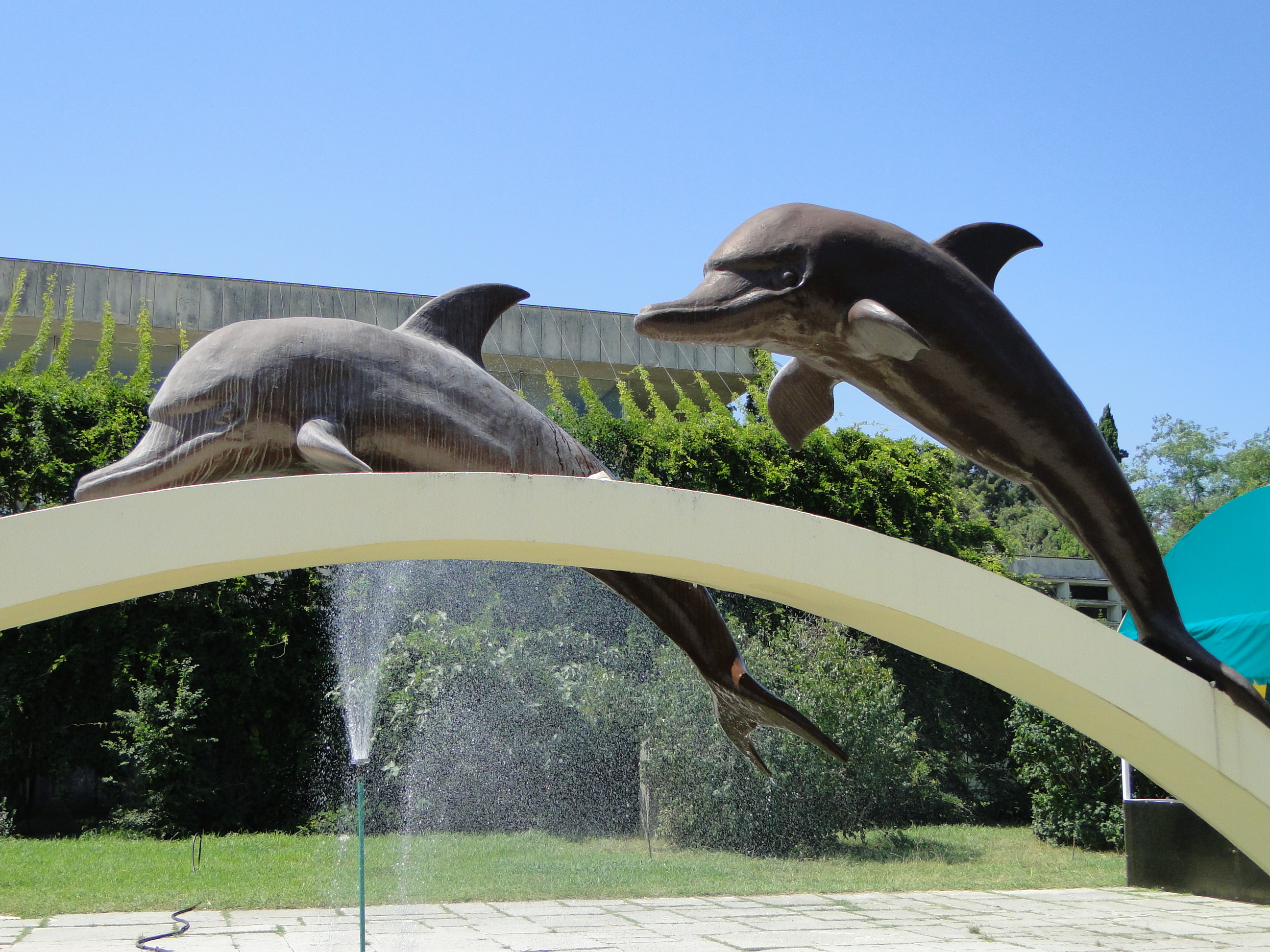
- From the top to bottom-right, Bzyb River, Gagra, Gega Waterfall, Gagra Range, Pitsunda

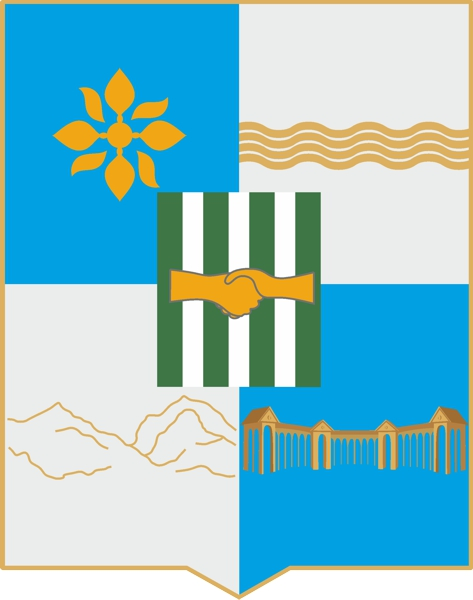
- Coat of arms
- Location of Gagra District in Abkhazia (de facto bordering)
- Coordinates: 43°25′55″N 40°15′53″E
- Country: Georgia
- De facto state: Abkhazia
- Capital: Gagra

Government
  - Governor: Yuri Khagush

Area
  - Total: 772 km^{2} (298 sq mi)

Population (2018)
  - Total: 39,390
  - Density: 51/km^{2} (130/sq mi)
- Time zone: UTC+3 (MSK)

Location of Gagra District on the map of Georgia

Gagra District is a district of Abkhazia. (Note: The political status of Abkhazia is disputed. Having unilaterally declared independence from Georgia in 1992, Abkhazia is formally recognised as an independent state by 4 UN member states (three other states previously recognised it but then withdrew their recognition), while the remainder of the international community recognizes it as de jure Georgian territory. Georgia continues to claim the area as its own territory, designating it as Russian-occupied territory.) It corresponds to the Georgian district by the same name. In medieval times, it was known as the southern part of Sadzen. It is located in the western part of Abkhazia, and the river Psou serves as a border with the Krasnodar Krai territory in Russia. The district’s capital is also called Gagra.

== Geography ==
The Psou River forms most of the border between Gagra District and Russia. The district is mostly mountainous with multiple ridges of the Greater Caucasus Mountains.

== History ==
In 1904, Gagra and its surroundings were transferred from the Sukhumsky District of Abkhazia to the Sochi District, which was under the control of Prince Oldenburgsky, and in 1917 it was returned to this position. In 1929, thanks to the Abkhaz authorities, the Pilenkovskaya volost between Gagra and Psou was returned to Abkhazia. It was then that Gagra was established as a separate district. Today it includes the city of Gagra, the urban settlements of Pitsunda, Tsandrypsh, as well as eleven villages – Alahadzi, Khishkha, Bzyp, Psahara, Gechripsh, Ldzaa, Mahadyr, Mkalripsh, Hashpsy, Askhuzara.

== Administration ==
Grigori Enik was reappointed as Administration Head on 10 May 2001 following the March 2001 local elections.

In December 2002, Enik was appointed Head of the State Customs Committee, he was succeeded by Valeri Bganba.

On 25 May 2006, Bganba was released from office by President Bagapsh upon his own request, and succeeded by Astamur Ketsba. In turn, after the election of Alexander Ankvab, on 6 September 2011 Ketsba was dismissed upon his own request and temporarily replaced by his deputy Teimuraz Kapba.

On 15 November, Grigori Enik, who had previously headed the Presidential Administration, was appointed Acting Head of Gagra District. On 28 May 2012, Enik was permanently appointed.

Following the May 2014 Revolution and the election of Raul Khajimba as President, he dismissed Enik and replaced him with MP Beslan Bartsits (as acting Head) on 22 October. Bartsits was confirmed in his post the following year.

On 16 May 2016, Bartsits became Head of the Presidential Administration. The same day, Gagra Forestry Director Zaur Bganba was appointed acting District Head. Bganba was confirmed in his post on 2 June.

=== List of governors ===
#	Name	From	Until	President	Comments
Chairmen of the (executive committee of the) City Soviet:
	Enver Kapba	1967	1970		
Heads of the City Administration:
	Ruslan Iazychba	≤1994	≥1997	Vladislav Ardzinba	
	Grigori Enik	≤2000	December 2002	Vladislav Ardzinba	First time
	Valeri Bganba	December 2002	12 February 2005	Vladislav Ardzinba	
	Valeri Bganba	12 February 2005	25 May 2006	Sergei Bagapsh	
	Astamur Ketsba	25 May 2006	29 May 2011	Sergei Bagapsh	
	Astamur Ketsba	29 May 2011	6 September 2011	Alexander Ankvab	
	Teimuraz Kapba	6 September 2011	15 November 2011	Alexander Ankvab	Acting
	Grigori Enik	15 November 2011	1 June 2014	Alexander Ankvab	Second time
	Grigori Enik	1 June 2014	22 October 2014	Valeri Bganba	
	Beslan Bartsits	22 October 2014	16 May 2016	Raul Khajimba	
	Zaur Bganba	16 May 2016	Present	Raul Khajimba	

== Demographics ==
The population of the Gagra town zone in 1989 was 77,079, but this number dropped dramatically following the collapse of the Soviet Union and the 1992-1993 war in Abkhazia, (including the ethnic cleansing of Georgians), to 37,002 at the time of the 2003 census. Ethnic Armenians now constitute a plurality in the district.

As of the 2011 census, this had risen to 40,217 (2011 census).

=== Ethnic groups ===
According to 2011 census, the ethnic composition was:

Ethnicity	Population	Percentage
Abkhazians	15,482	38,5%
Armenians	15,422	38,4%
Georgians	999	2,5%
Greeks	259	0,6%
Russians	6,334	15,7%
Ukrainians	529	1,3%
Other	1,188	2,9%

== Settlements ==
The district's main settlements are:

- Gagra
- Pitsunda
- Leselidze
- Gantiadi
- Bzyb

The district is mostly mountainous except for the Bzyb lowland in the southern part of it (where Pitsunda is located) and is crossed by several ranges (Gagra, Arabika and others).

== See also ==
- Administrative divisions of Abkhazia
- Aibgha (village)
- Alpuri (village)
