= Subdivisions of Abkhazia =

Overview of the levels of political administration in Abkhazia

Map of subdivisions of Abkhazia.

During the Soviet era, the Abkhaz ASSR was divided into six raions (districts) named after their respective capitals.

The administrative divisions of the disputed Republic of Abkhazia have stayed the same, with one exception: in 1995, Tkvarcheli District was created around the town of Tkvarcheli from parts of the Ochamchira and Gali districts.

The Georgian government, which claims Abkhazia as an autonomous republic but lacks control, has not changed the subdivisions from the Soviet-era.

== Districts of Abkhazia ==
Districts are led by the head of the administration, who is simultaneously the mayor of the district's capital, except in the case of Sukhumi. The head of the administration is appointed by the president following consultations with the District Assembly. Previously, the head was appointed from among the District Assembly members, but without consultation, but in practice the president would often appoint an acting head who was not a member of the Assembly but who was subsequently elected to the Assembly. The current procedure was adopted by the People's Assembly of Abkhazia on 29 January 2016, over competing proposals to elect the head directly by the district's residents or by Assembly members, and after voting almost unanimously not to change the previous procedure on 30 July 2015.

districts of Abkhazia

- (1) Gagra
- (2) Gudauta
- (3) Sukhumi
- (4) Gulripshi
- (5) Ochamchira
- (6) Tkvarcheli
- (7) Gali

== Towns ==
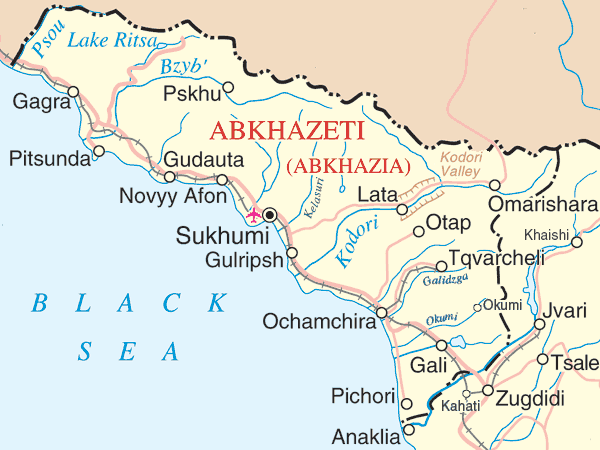
Map of Abkhazia

- Gagra
- Gali
- Gudauta
- New Athos
- Ochamchire
- Pitsunda (since 2007)
- Sukhumi
- Tkvarcheli

== Urban settlements ==
- Bzyb
- Gulripshi
- Leselidze
- Miusera
- Gantiadi

== Historical regions of Abkhazia ==
Abkhazia has traditionally been divided into several historical regions (they roughly correspond to modern districts that are given in parentheses):

- Sadzen (Gagra district and Sochi region which is now in Russia)
- Bzyb (Gudauta district)
- Gumaa (Sukhumi district)
- Abzhywa (Ochamchira and partly Tkvarcheli districts)
- Samurzakano (Gali and partly Tkvarcheli district)
- Dal-Tsabal (Gulripshi district)

These are the regions mentioned in the Abkhazian Constitution of 1994. According to the popular (but erroneous) belief that the seven stripes of the Abkhazian flag correspond to the seven historical regions of the country, the seventh one represents Pskhu-Aibga.
