= Russian-occupied territories in Georgia =

Russian-occupied territories in Georgia (Georgian: რუსეთის მიერ ოკუპირებული ტერიტორიები საქართველოში, romanized: rusetis mier ok'up'irebuli t'erit'oriebi sakartveloshi) refers to areas of Georgia's sovereign territory to which a large portion of the international community designates as occupied by Russia since the Russo-Georgian War in 2008, regardless of what their status is in Russian law. They consist of the regions of the Autonomous Republic of Abkhazia and the former South Ossetian Autonomous Region of Soviet Georgia (currently divided between several non-autonomous administrative divisions of independent Georgia), whose status is a matter of international dispute.

Since the 2008 war and subsequent Russian military occupation of Abkhazia and South Ossetia, the Russian government, along with four other UN member states, considers the territories sovereign independent states: the Republic of Abkhazia and the Republic of South Ossetia. Before Russian occupation, the unrecognized republics of Abkhazia and South Ossetia did not completely control their respectively claimed territories. Russian military bases were established in Abkhazia and South Ossetia. Russia does not allow the European Union Monitoring Mission to enter either Abkhazia or South Ossetia. Russia has signed agreements with the de facto civilian administrations of both territories to integrate them militarily and economically into Russia. Russian troops have started the process of demarcation ("borderization") along, and beyond the Georgia–South Ossetia separation line.

Both Abkhazia and South Ossetia are widely recognized as integral parts of Georgia and together represent 20 percent of Georgia's internationally recognized territory. The Georgian "Law on Occupied Territories of Georgia", adopted in 2008, criminalizes and prosecutes entry into Abkhazia and South Ossetia from the Russian side without special permission and allows only economic activity in the two territories that are in accordance with it. Georgia and many other members of the international community including the United States, China, the United Kingdom, France, Germany, Italy, Canada, Australia, Ukraine, Turkey, Japan, the European Union, the OSCE, and the Council of Europe as well as the United Nations have recognized Abkhazia and South Ossetia as occupied territories and have condemned the Russian military presence and actions there.

== Overview ==
Georgian administrative divisions are outlined in black. Russian-occupied territories (Abkhazia and South Ossetia) are shown in pink.

Territory in question	Autonomous Republic of Abkhazia	former South Ossetian Autonomous Oblast
Claimed by	Georgia (1992–present)	
De-facto administrated by	Republic of Abkhazia (1992–present)	Republic of South Ossetia (1992–present)
Russia considers it part of its territory?	No, Russia recognises Abkhazia as an independent state since 2008 following the Russo-Georgian War	No, Russia recognises South Ossetia as an independent state since 2008 following the Russo-Georgian War
Nature of occupation	Presence of the 7th Military Base, opposed by Georgia	Presence of the 4th Guards Military Base, opposed by Georgia
De-facto armed forces	Abkhazian Armed Forces	Armed Forces of South Ossetia
De-facto circulating currency	Russian ruble	
Passports	Abkhazian passport. Residents are also eligible for Russian passports for travel abroad.	South Ossetian passport. Residents are also eligible for Russian passports for travel abroad.
Under Russian telephone numbering plan?	Yes, +7 (840) and +7 (940)	Yes, +7 (850) and +7 (929)

== History ==
After the Russo-Georgian War, on 26 August 2008, the Russian President Dmitry Medvedev signed decrees recognizing the independence of Abkhazia and South Ossetia as sovereign states. The Georgian parliament unanimously passed a resolution on 28 August 2008 formally declaring Abkhazia and South Ossetia Russian-occupied territories, and calling Russian troops occupying forces. Russia established diplomatic relations with both Abkhazia and South Ossetia. Russian troops were placed in both Abkhazia and South Ossetia. Russian Foreign Minister Sergey Lavrov said that a military presence in Abkhazia and South Ossetia was necessary to prevent Georgia from regaining control.

Russians gradually withdrew from Georgia proper after the war, but they remained in Perevi. On 12 December 2008, Russian forces withdrew from Perevi. Eight hours later, a 500-strong Russian contingent re-occupied the village, and Georgian police withdrew after the Russians threatened to fire. All Russian troops in Perevi withdrew to South Ossetia on 18 October 2010 and a Georgian Army unit moved in.

In 2009, Georgian president Mikheil Saakashvili mentioned in several addresses the fact that Russia was staying 40 kilometers away from Georgia's capital, Tbilisi, and aimed weapons at it.

In the province of Racha, the bridge on the road leading to the Mamison Pass on the border with Russia was blown up in June 2009 and Georgian border guards allegedly pulled back several kilometres deeper into the Georgian territory. Mamuka Areshidze, a Caucasus affairs expert, said that the pull back "could have been conditioned with the Georgian authorities willingness to prevent clashes with Russians".

In April 2010, the Foreign Relations Committee of the Parliament of Georgia appealed to legislative bodies of 31 countries, asking to declare Georgia's two regions Abkhazia and South Ossetia as territories under Russian occupation and to recognize that the massive displacement of civilians from those regions by Russia amounts to ethnic cleansing.

In March 2011, the Russians demanded that the village of Aibga, situated on the Psou River in the northwest part of Abkhazia, be transferred to Russia. During the existence of the Soviet Union, the village was divided into two; the southern part belonged to Georgia and the northern part to Russia. It is claimed that Russia further demanded 160 square kilometres (62 sq mi) of land near Lake Ritsa in Gagra District. After the Abkhaz side proved that the southern part of Aibga belonged to the Georgian SSR, the claim on the village was dropped by Russia.

On 11 June 2014, Georgian Prime Minister Irakli Garibashvili generated controversy when he told the BBC News that Russia was "not interested in annexing" Abkhazia and South Ossetia. The opposition United National Movement criticized this statement, accusing Garibashvili of failing to defend state interests on the international arena.

Russia signed "alliance and integration" agreements with Abkhazia in November 2014 and South Ossetia in March 2015. Both treaties formally placed the respective militaries of the breakaway republics under Russian command, while the agreement with South Ossetia also included provisions integrating its economy with that of Russia. The border between Russia and South Ossetia was also effectively dissolved, with customs being integrated. Georgian officials have strenuously condemned the deepening of the occupied territories' economic and military dependence on Russia, calling it "creeping annexation". Georgian officials denounced integration treaties signed between Russian President Vladimir Putin and his Abkhaz and South Ossetian counterparts in 2014 and 2015 as attempts to annex the breakaway regions into the Russian Federation.

== Georgian law ==
In late October 2008, president Mikheil Saakashvili signed into law legislation on the occupied territories passed by the Parliament of Georgia. The law covers the breakaway regions of Abkhazia and the territory of former South Ossetian Autonomous Oblast.

In February 2013, it was reported that the Georgian Government was considering amendments to the law that would decriminalize entry into Abkhazia and South Ossetia from territories other than those controlled by Georgia and make it an administrative offence, subject to financial penalty instead of prison term.

On 16 May 2013, the amendments were made to the law on occupied territories of Georgia. Violating this law first time will entail administrative sanctions, not criminal persecution and imprisonment as it was before. According to the amendments if a person crosses the border illegally for the first time, he/she is fined for GEL 400, while repeated violation is still a criminal offense posing up to 1 year of imprisonment or minimum GEL 800 fine.

In July 2013, reports emerged that the actor Gérard Depardieu would be investigated by Georgian authorities for the violation of law. Georgian Government representative said that "Depardieu visited Abkhazia's capital, Sokhumi, and met with the region's separatist leadership on 1 July without preliminary consultations with Tbilisi."

In February 2014, the Ministry of Foreign Affairs of Georgia issued a warning to the visitors of the Sochi Winter Olympics that entering Abkhazia from the territory of the Russian Federation would violate an international law and that individuals going through the boundaries, uncontrolled by Georgian customs and border control, would be subject to prosecution by the Georgian justice system. The statement was a response to the earlier declaration by the de facto authorities in Sukhumi that they simplified visa rules for tourists seeking to enter Abkhazia during the Winter Olympics via the Psou border crossing point.

On 15 April 2014, after annexation of Crimea by the Russian Federation, Ukrainian Rada adopted the law "On Ensuring Protection of the Rights and Freedoms of Citizens and Legal Regime on the Temporarily Occupied Territory of Ukraine". The Ukrainian law is based on the Georgian law on Occupied Territories.

=== Overview ===
"The Law of Georgia on Occupied Territories" (in Georgian), 23 October 2008.

According to the Georgian law titled Law on Occupied Territories of Georgia, the term "the occupied territories and territorial waters" or "The Occupied Territories" covers the territories of the Autonomous Republic of Abkhazia, Tskhinvali Region (territory of the former South Ossetia Autonomous Region) and waters in the Black Sea located in the aquatic territory of the Black Sea, along Georgia's state border with the Russian Federation, to the South of the Psou river, up to the administrative border at the estuary of the Engury River. The term also covers the air space over the aforementioned territories.

The law restricts free movement and economic activity in the territories. In particular, according to the law, foreign citizens should enter the two breakaway regions only from Georgia. Entry into Abkhazia should be carried out from the Zugdidi District and into South Ossetia from the Gori District.

The legislation also lists special cases in which entry into the breakaway regions will not be regarded as illegal. It stipulates that a special permit on entry into the breakaway regions can be issued if the trip there "... serves Georgia's state interests; peaceful resolution of the conflict; de-occupation or humanitarian purposes". Citizens of foreign countries and persons without citizenship having entered Georgia from Russian side through Abkhazia and South Ossetia, who seek asylum in the country, are not subject to punishment.

Any economic activity (entrepreneurial or non-entrepreneurial) is prohibited, regardless of whether or not it is implemented for receiving profit, income or compensation, if under the laws of Georgia 'On Licences and Permits', 'On Entrepreneurs', 'On Bee-Farming', 'On Museums', 'On Water', 'On Civil Registry', 'On Electronic Communications', the Maritime Code of Georgia or the Civil Code of Georgia, such activity requires a license, permit, authorization or registration or if, under the Georgian legislation, such activity requires an agreement, but it has not been granted. Any transaction related to real estate property and concluded in violation of the Georgian law is deemed void from the moment of conclusion and does not give rise to any legal consequences. The law's provision covering economic activities is retrospective, going back to 1990.

The law prohibits international air traffic and maritime traffic (except for the cases defined in the UN Convention on Maritime Law of 1982), railway traffic and international automobile transportation of cargo. The law also prohibits the use of national resources and organization of cash transfer.

The law says that the Russian Federation – the state which has carried out military occupation – is fully responsible for the violation of human rights in Abkhazia and South Ossetia. The Russian Federation, according to the document, is also responsible for compensation of material and moral damage inflicted on Georgian citizens, stateless persons and foreign citizens, who are in Georgia and enter the occupied territories with appropriate permits.

The law also says that de facto state agencies and officials operating in the occupied territories are regarded by Georgia as illegal. The law will remain in force until "full restoration of the jurisdiction of Georgia".

=== Criticisms ===
In 2009, the Committee on the Honouring of Obligations and Commitments of the Parliamentary Assembly of the Council of Europe asked the European Commission for Democracy Through Law (Venice Commission) for an opinion on the law on occupied territories of Georgia. The Commission's resulting March 2009 report criticized the Georgian law. The law was at odds with UN Security Council resolutions that were binding both on the Russian Federation and on Georgia. The report said that the law raised concerns "with regard to humanitarian access to the conflict affected areas". The terms used in Article 2 contradicted 1982 United Nations Convention on the Law of the Sea (UNCLOS). Limitation on free migration "may be in contradiction with the Georgian international engagements". The Commission also stressed Georgia's obligation to respect the 1951 Refugee Convention. The commission also criticized the law's lack of clarity, saying that "the text of the law is not clear." In its aspects dealing with private property (Article 5), it might have violated Article 1 of the First Protocol of the European Convention on Human Rights (ECHR) and the principle of proportionality, as well as additionally violating further aspects of the Hague Convention (The Laws and Customs of War on Land). A restriction and criminalization of economic activities (Article 6) was contrary to the rule of customary international law, and also the IV Geneva Convention. The Commission also recommended "the insertion of a clarifying provision" into the law regarding basic documents issued by illegal authorities concerning the personal status.

In 2012, the European Commission considered that Georgia's "continued application of the law on Occupied Territories" was a concern for the effectiveness of the "engagement strategy" with the breakaway territories, and in 2013 noted that there had been no change to the "restrictive aspects of the law" but that it hoped for a "more relaxed implementation of the Law" from the new government in Georgia.

=== International reactions ===
- — The Ministry of Foreign Affairs of Azerbaijan issued a statement in which it called on the citizens of Azerbaijan to refrain from travelling to Abkhazia and South Ossetia without permission of Georgian authorities and warned that these trips were considered illegal and the travellers would be punished accordingly. The Ministry also referred to these territories as "territories that are out of control of its Government".
- (Czech Republic) — The Czech Ministry of Foreign Affairs issued a warning for its citizens.
- — In connection with the adoption of the Georgian law on occupied territories, the Foreign Ministry of Ukraine has advised their citizens to fulfill the provision of international law and refuse to cross the border from the Russian side.
- (Romania) — The Romanian Ministry of Foreign Affairs issued special guidelines for its citizens attending the Sochi Olympics. According to the guidelines, travel to Abkhazia and South Ossetia from Russia without warning the Georgian side is prohibited and punishable.
- — France's Ministry of Foreign Affairs released guidelines to travellers for the Sochi 2014 Olympic Games. The official Spectator Guide included a special note recommending French citizens to abstain from visiting Georgia's regions of Abkhazia and South Ossetia. The guide stated it was a punishable crime.
- — The United Kingdom’s Foreign Office advised against all travel to Abkhazia and South Ossetia, stating "The British government does not recognise the unilateral declarations of independence made by the de facto authorities in Abkhazia and South Ossetia."
- — The Foreign Ministry of Estonia warned its citizens that travelling to Abkhazia and South Ossetia is illegal and punishable without permission of the Georgian government.
- (Spain) — The Spanish Ministry of Foreign Affairs strongly discourages its citizens from travelling to the occupied Abkhazia and South Ossetia without permission of the Georgian government, as it is illegal under international law and subject to fines and a potential prison sentence.

== Russian position ==
Russia claims, that "Abkhazia and South Ossetia are not occupied territories, but independent States." The Russian Federation also holds that it "... does not at present, nor will it in the future, exercise effective control over South Ossetia or Abkhazia;" and "it was not an occupying power." It also noted that "despite having crossed into the territory of Georgia in the course of the conflict, Russia was not an occupying power in terms of IHL." According to Russia, "the number of Russian troops stationed in South Ossetia and Abkhazia [...] does not allow Russia in practice to establish effective control over these territories which total 12 500 sq. kilometres in size."

On 14 March 2012, Russia's Foreign Minister Sergey Lavrov said that Russia was ready to lift visa requirements for Georgian citizens, if Tbilisi repealed its law on occupied territories. "When he [President Saakashvili] announced that all Russian citizens could travel to Georgia without visa, he forgot to mention that a law 'on occupied territories' is in force in Georgia according to which anyone who has visited South Ossetia or Abkhazia since [the 2008 August] war, which was launched by Saakashvili, will face criminal liability in Georgia with jail term from two to four years," RIA Novosti news agency quoted Lavrov as saying while addressing the lawmakers in the State Duma.

In June 2013, the Russian Foreign Ministry asked Georgia to abolish the law on the occupied territories of Georgia. Russian deputy Foreign Minister Grigory Karasin claimed that the abolition of the law would "create a favourable environment for cultural exchanges, above all for tourist trips".

== Situation on the ground ==
Russian military bases in South Ossetia/Tskhinvali region.

Russian military bases in Abkhazia

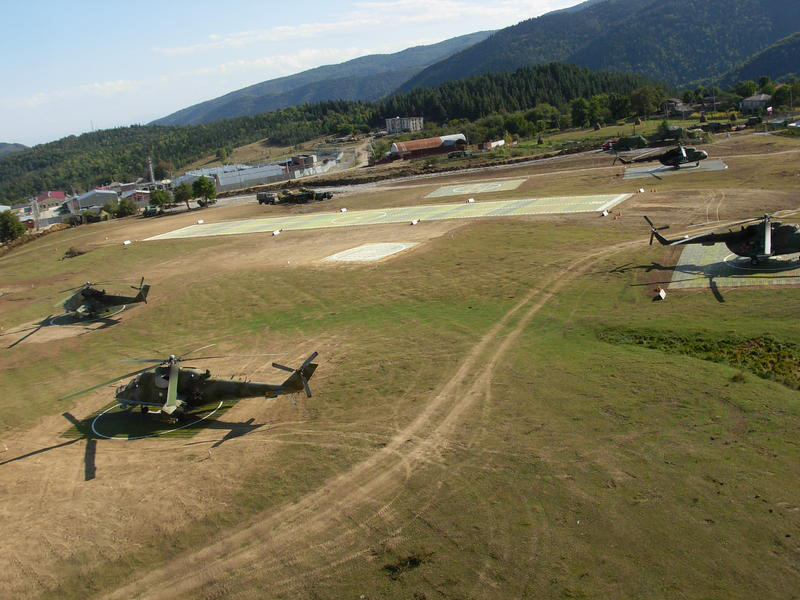
Russian military base near town of Java as of 2008.

Currently 20% of Georgia's internationally recognized territory is under Russian military occupation. Russia does not allow the EUMM monitors to enter South Ossetia and Abkhazia in violation of the Six Point Ceasefire Agreement.

The United States Department of State published The Human Rights Report in 2011 where it is underlined that de facto authorities of Abkhazia and South Ossetia are supported by several thousand occupying Russian troops since 2008. The de facto Abkhaz authorities restricted the rights of ethnic Georgians to participate in the political process and to exercise basic rights. Since 2008 the de facto authorities of South Ossetia have refused to permit ethnic Georgians expelled during and after the 2008 war to return to South Ossetia unless they renounced their Georgian citizenship and accepted a Russian passport. No international party was able to monitor the extent of the Russian military presence. Media in the occupied territories was tightly restricted by the de facto authorities and Russian occupying forces.

The report prepared by the National Committee on American Foreign Policy and the Institute for the Study of Human Rights, raised concerns that Russia "not only failed to withdraw, it expanded territory under its control beyond the pre-war conflict zones" and Russia "established a troop presence in 51 villages it did not control before the war and conducted military patrols on territory it did not previously hold". The report also describes Russian military presence in Abkhazia and South Ossetia:

"Russia also deployed new weapons systems, such as attack helicopters and tanks where they did not exist before the war. By October 2010, Abkhazia and South Ossetia became host to "Smerch" type offensive rockets, "Tochka-U", and S-21, a tactical rocket that can carry nuclear, cluster, or chemical agents up to 150 kilometers. S-300 surface to air missiles were based in Abkhazia. Russia signed 49-year lease agreements with automatic 5-year renewals in Gudauta and Tskhinvali. Russia has built 5 permanent military bases in South Ossetia manned by approximately 5,000 security personnel. Another 5,000 are based in Abkhazia. Both deployments include regular army troops, border guards and FSB personnel. Russia's Ministry of Defense revamped its military command in the North Caucasus, linking it to Russian forces in Georgia."

In one of the Georgian villages in South Ossetia, Russian forces bulldozed the Georgians' houses and built new military bases in their place, for the Russian 58th Army.

A report by International Crisis Group found that as Russia has control over Abkhazia's "borders", roads and sea, it does not need a heavy permanent presence; Russia can move military equipment and troops into and out of Abkhazia at will. However, there is the heavy Russian military and FSB border guard presence along the Abkhaz-Georgia proper administrative boundary line (ABL) in the Gali district.

2013 Human Rights Reports: Georgia mentions that there were abductions along the administrative boundary lines of both occupied regions in 2013. De facto officials of the occupied territories and Russian officials continued to detain people for their "illegal" crossing of the administrative boundary line. Media in South Ossetia and Abkhazia was still restricted by the authorities and Russian occupying forces. De facto authorities and Russian forces in occupied Abkhazia and South Ossetia restricted the movement of the population across the administrative boundaries for health care and other services. The quality of education in occupied Abkhazia and South Ossetia was reportedly poor.

According to Elizabeth Cullen Dunn and Michael S. Bobick, this situation is called "occupation without occupation" and is a distinctive form of warfare. Vladimir Putin's form of warfare is "the spectacle of dominance", that creates docile populations within the new geographic boundaries of Russia in Europe. The key element of strategy is to use the separatist regions as perches from which to intimidate the larger states that once administered them. A creeping occupation and subsequent takeover of strategic positions in the breakaway regions aim at re-establishing control over Russia's "near abroad". By occupying breakaway provinces and establishing military bases from which to threaten occupation of the rest of Ukraine, Georgia, and Moldova, Russia can influence the actions of the sovereign states. The "war without war" and "occupation without occupation" is more flexible and cheaper than a real occupation, since the potential target can be rapidly changed.

== Russian border operations ==
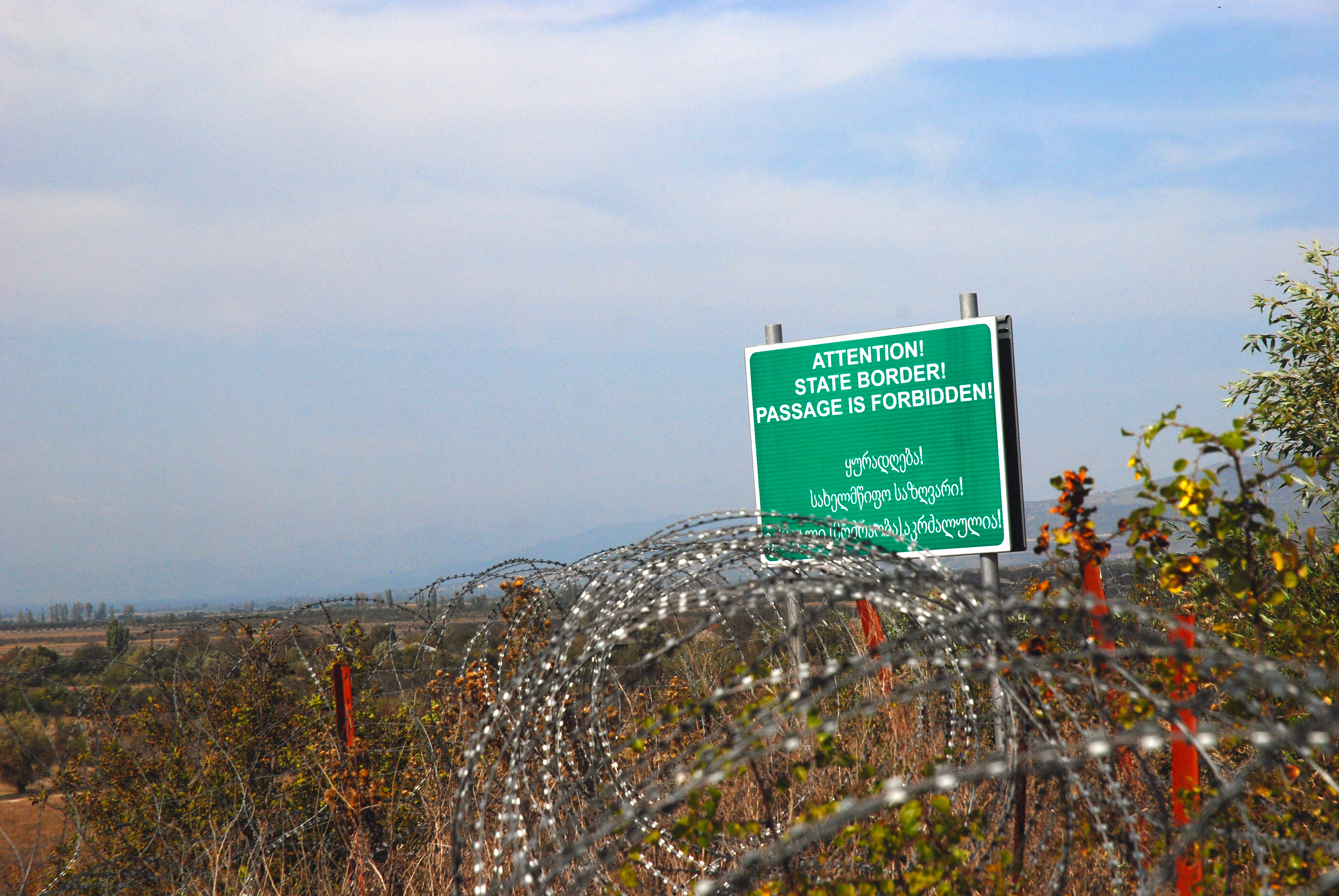
The ABL and borderization at Khurvaleti village.

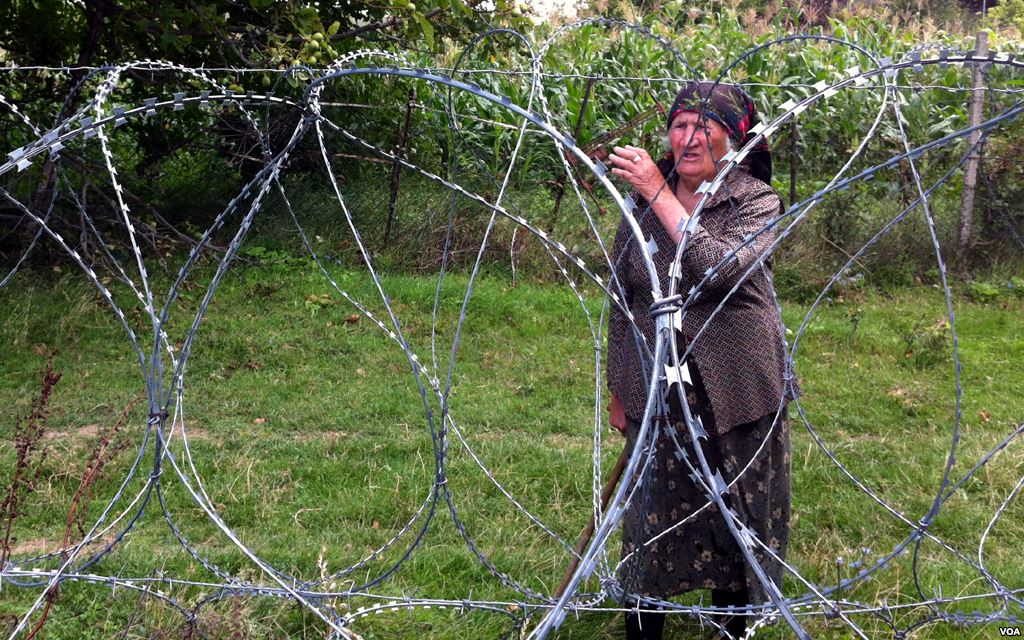
A Georgian villager is left beyond the barbed-wire fence installed by the Russian troops along the South Ossetia–Shida Kartli administrative boundary line (ABL) in September 2013.

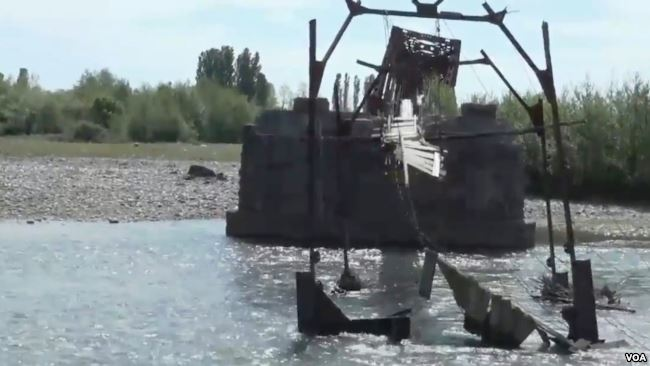
One of the bridges connecting Abkhazia with the rest of Georgia dismantled by the Abkhaz-Russian border troops in April 2016.

On 2 August 2009, Russian troops reportedly moved the South Ossetian boundary markers about 500 metres (0.3 mi) into the Georgian-controlled territory in the village of Kveshi. However, on 4 August the Russians removed the iron posts they had installed earlier in Kveshi. The demarcation of the South Ossetian boundary in Shida Kartli started in 2011 with the construction of a few fences in Ditsi and Dvani, but it was stopped after local negotiations.

The process of border demarcation continued in February 2013. Russian troops started the installation of barbed wire barriers to separate the South Ossetian territory from the rest of Georgia. In some instances, the Georgian residents could not access their plots or come out of their homes because the border of barbed wire runs through or around their property. According to Georgia's Interior Ministry, there was no fencing activities at the administrative border of Georgia's other breakaway region of Abkhazia, where the Enguri river served as "a natural dividing line", but Russian troops were blocking the pathways to prevent "illegal" movement across the administrative boundary line. The new South Ossetia-Georgia border extended between 50–300 metres (150–1,000 ft) beyond the occupation line. By August 2013, an estimated 27 kilometres (17 mi) of barriers had been built.

The process – erecting borders between Russian-occupied territories and Georgia proper – was called "borderization". The "borderization" process also involved a gradual advance of the occupation line inside Georgia by grabbing small chunks of Georgian-held terrain to enlarge the Russian-held territory, placing it nominally under South Ossetian administration. The "borderization" intensified after Russian President Vladimir Putin endorsed a proposal by the Russian government to sign an agreement on the state border between Russia and South Ossetia. The decree published on 12 September said that Putin had directed the Foreign Ministry to hold talks with South Ossetia and sign a treaty upon reaching an agreement. In Dvani, the village of Kareli Municipality, the border was moved further inside the Georgian-controlled territories by 400 metres (0.25 mi). Several families were given a few days to abandon their homes in Dvani. New border crossed through several Georgian villages, and effectively separated people from their farmland, ancestral homes, and cemeteries. After Ditsi and Dvani, Adzvi became the third Georgian village that was divided into two parts. By late October 2013, about 40 km (25 mi) of fencing or barbed wire had been erected, supported by intermittent pylons equipped with hi-tech surveillance cameras. Russia had built 19 border guard bases.

In September 2013, it was suggested that the continuation of "borderization" would place 1,600 metres (1 mi) of the Baku–Supsa oil pipeline beyond the occupation line. Georgian deputy Minister for Energy and Natural Resources, Ilia Eloshvili said that the Russians had to move the line one more kilometre (0.6 mi) into the Georgian-controlled territory in order for the portion of the pipeline to be under their authority. According to him, theoretically there would be no problems for operating the underground pipeline, but the BP supervisors would not be able to supervise this portion of the pipeline.

Russian authorities remained tight-lipped about the developments, claiming only that South Ossetia was marking out its "true territorial boundaries in line with maps from the Soviet-era", when it was an autonomous region within the Georgian Soviet Socialist Republic. The Russian Foreign Ministry also dismissed the report that the boundary was being shifted further into Georgia proper and warned of "serious consequences" if Tbilisi continued what it described as "political speculation". Sergey Lavrov declared that fences across South Ossetia would no longer be needed after "hotheads cool down". Georgians suspected that the fence-building by the Russian military personnel was connected to the fact that their country made steps towards close cooperation with the European Union by initiating an association agreement with the EU. It was also suggested that Russia was trying to drag Georgia into a renewed conflict. The border was also dubbed a "rural Berlin Wall" for all the villages it had split into two.

In January 2014, it was announced that a swathe of Abkhazian territory would be included in part of the large "security zone" being set up in advance of the Winter Olympics in Sochi, Russia. In a period between 20 January and 21 March, anyone entering the zone had to produce documents to police. A stationary checkpoint was established at the village of Bagripshi in Gagra district on the edge of the 11 km (7 mi) zone, which was manned by officers from the Abkhaz security service, interior ministry and migration service. The Government of Georgia expressed "deep concern" over the "illegal expansion". On 19 March 2014, the security zone was lifted.

During the period surrounding the holding of the Sochi Olympics, the process of "borderization" along the South Ossetian ABL was suspended, however after the end of the Games it was resumed despite the protests of the Georgian Government. The installation of a security fence along the 400-kilometre (250 mi) Georgian-South Ossetian administrative boundary line (ABL) had a huge impact on the lives of local people. The EUMM Georgia representative said: "Just walking up to the fence means you've already crossed over and will be arrested." According to EUMM spokesperson Ann Vassen, the detention cases were around five to six per week in early 2014. The Georgian Government estimated that the total length of the barbed wire installations along the South Ossetian ABL was about 50 km (30 mi) by April 2014.

On 15 April 2014, three Georgian journalists were detained near an administrative boundary line of South Ossetia. The TV crew was working on a report about "borderization" and a shift of the boundary deeper into Georgian-controlled areas. Russia's Foreign Ministry claimed that the journalists "intentionally and demonstratively" crossed the border and this was "a planned action for the purposes of complicating the atmosphere" of the scheduled meeting between Russian and Georgian diplomats (Grigory Karasin and Zurab Abashidze) in Prague on 16 April. The Ministry said in an official statement: "All this, together with the latest cock-and-bull stories about 'violations of Georgian air space by Russian aircraft', is evidence that the forces attempting to normalise relations with Russia, and the forces sharing the regime of Mikheil Saakashvili supporting the escalation of hostilities, continue to fight within the Georgian community." The detained journalists were released later on 16 April. One of them, journalist Bela Zakaidze recalled the hours spent in pre-detention isolator in Tskhinvali and talked about psychological pressure. Grigory Karasin said: "The journalists were detained for understandable reasons. Today they were expelled back to Georgian territory under a judgment of the South Ossetian court."

In mid-April 2014, two portions of Baku-Supsa pipeline reportedly appeared on the Russian-controlled territories near the villages of Orchosani and Karapili. As of late July 2014, Russian forces were still constructing "security fence" across South Ossetia.

Green border signs claiming "state border" started to appear for the first time in 2015 along the imaginary administrative boundary line and since then have been moved further into Georgian territory on several occasions.

In July 2017, it was reported that Russia again moved its fences and border signs several hundred meters deeper into Georgian territory.

=== Georgian reaction ===
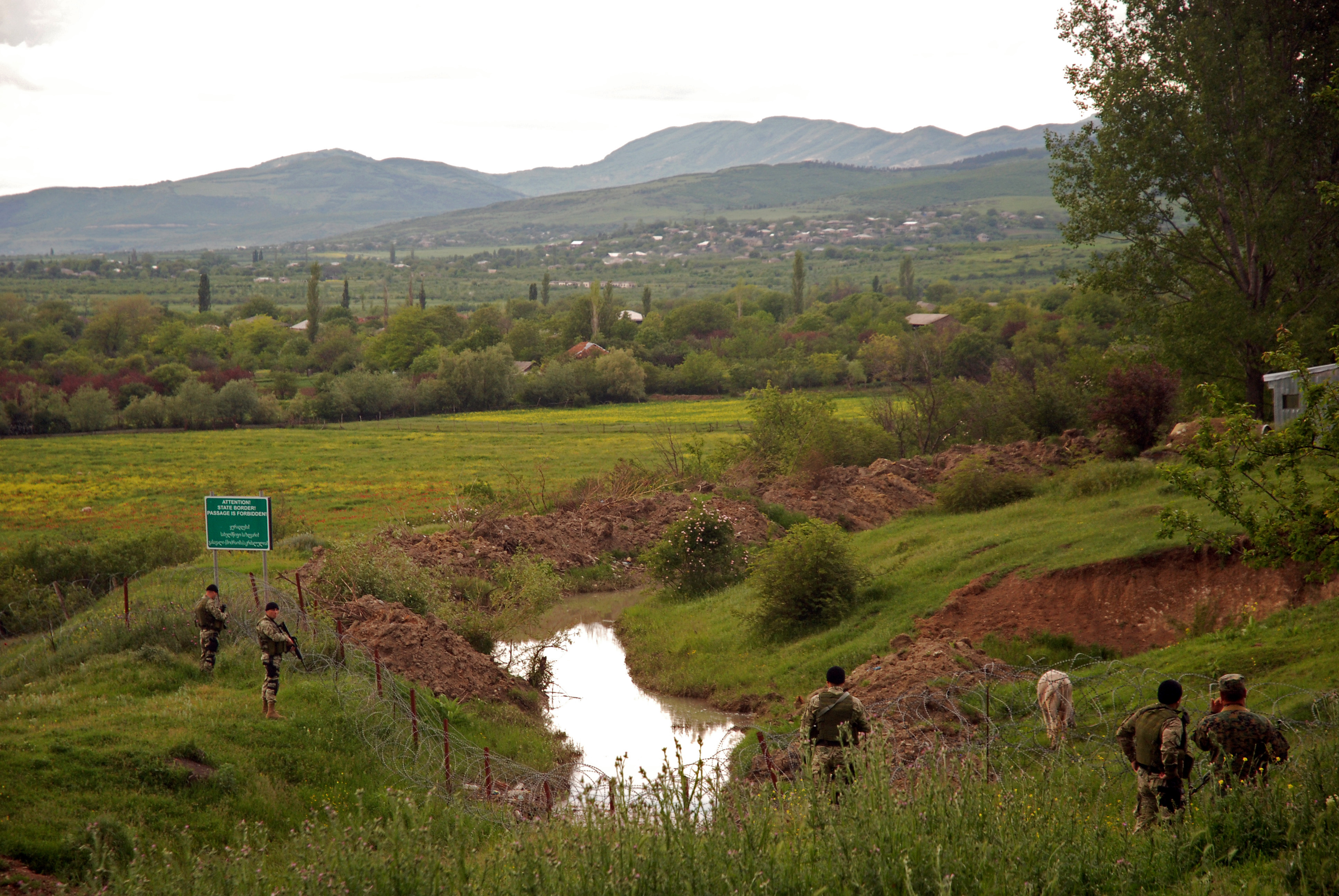
Georgian police at the barbed wire fences installed by the Russian and South Ossetian forces at Khurvaleti in 2016.

"What's happening is very unpleasant and, frankly speaking, incomprehensible, too. I thought a different relationship would develop between the new Georgian government and Russia", Georgian Prime Minister Bidzina Ivanishvili said in an interview with a Georgian newspaper in May 2013.

On 17 September 2013, the Ministry of Foreign Affairs of Georgia issued a statement on the Russian troops' illegal activities along the Tskhinvali region's occupation line and expressed its concern. The statement also said: "Critical situation in Georgia's occupied regions and adjacent areas once again underlines the necessity of the establishment international security and human rights monitoring mechanisms."

On 21 September 2013, Alex Petriashvili, the Georgian State Minister of Euro-Atlantic Integration, said that the recent "provocations" did not promote normalization of relations between Georgia and Russia. "We think that Georgian government responds the provocations that took place in recent days and months maturely and coherently and we don't yield to the provocations. These provocations don't promote normalization of Georgia-Russian relations."

Georgian President Mikheil Saakashvili raised the issue during his address to the United Nations General Assembly on 25 September 2013. "The annexation of Georgian lands by Russian troops continues," he stated. "Despite the friendly statements made by the new Georgian government in recent weeks and months, the Russian military keeps advancing its positions, dividing communities with new barbed wire and threatening our economy."

On 25 September 2013, Ivanishvili declared that the resumption of "borderization" along South Ossetia-Georgia demarcation line was linked to the Kremlin's anxiety regarding the upcoming 2014 Sochi Winter Olympic Games. He also said: "Much will be clarified probably after the Olympics. At this stage all these barbwires, I think, is not even in the interest of [Russia], but the Olympics is of major importance for Russia."

In October 2013, several rallies were held in Georgia to protest against Russian occupation. On 13 October, non-governmental organizations (NGOs) and students went to the village Ditsi to protest the "borderization". They symbolically lit torches and released balloons. At about 15:00, another rally started in the Georgian towns of Tbilisi, Rustavi, Telavi, Gori, Batumi, Kutaisi and Zugdidi. At about 19:00 a concert started on Rose Revolution Square in Tbilisi under the slogan "No to Occupation! No to Sochi Olympics!"

President Giorgi Margvelashvili said on 26 February 2014, that "completely senseless" process of "borderization" aimed at "maintaining conflict". He said: "These barbed wire fences have no strategic military purpose whatsoever. This is an action definitely directly against the people – against those people who want to see and meet each other beyond barbed wire fences."

On 3 March 2014, several hundred Georgians held a rally in the village Atotsi near the South Ossetian boundary protesting the resumption of installation of barbed wire by Russian soldiers. Demonstrators carried Ukrainian flags because they saw the similarity between the situation in Georgia and the crisis in Ukraine. Demonstrators also performed the Georgian anthem. Ossetian/Russian news agency OSInform reported that a rally was held by "Georgian fascist elements", the number of "the destructive elements" was about 500, and they were "accompanied by the Georgian Polizei". The news report concluded that "Georgian fascism is not finished off and is raising its head together with the Ukrainian supporters of Bandera."

== International position ==
Abkhazia and South Ossetia mutually recognise one another as independent states, and both are also recognised by one other Russia-backed non-UN member state: Transnistria. Only four United Nations member states recognise Abkhazia and South Ossetia: Nicaragua, Russia, Syria, and Venezuela.

=== Ukraine ===
On 19 September 2008, Hryhoriy Omelchenko, member of Verkhovna Rada from Yulia Tymoshenko Bloc, declared that Russia attacked Georgia without a declaration of war and occupied the Georgian territories. He said that: "Therefore, according to international legal norms, Russian Federation is an aggressor, invader and occupant." He called for respect for inviolability of existing borders and territorial integrity.

=== Latvia ===
On 3 March 2009, Latvian President Valdis Zatlers met Giorgi Baramidze, the Vice-Prime Minister and Minister for European and Euro-Atlantic Integration of Georgia. The president expressed his support for Georgia's domestic reforms and foreign policy. He also asked Baramidze what Russia was doing in those parts of Georgia that it had occupied.

In June 2011, the Foreign Affairs Committee of the Saeima adopted a statement supporting Georgia's territorial integrity and condemning the Russian occupation of South Ossetia and Abkhazia. The Committee expressed its disappointment that the Russian Federation continued to ignore the six-point agreement signed on 12 August 2008, and called on the Russian Federation to fulfill its commitments.

=== Czech Republic ===
In October 2009, the Senate of the Parliament of the Czech Republic adopted a resolution on the situation in Georgia. The Senate stated that it was necessary that international organizations should be given the opportunity to work in the occupied territories. It called on Russia to respect the ceasefire agreement reached on 12 August 2008 and to allow the dignified return of refugees to Abkhazia and South Ossetia. The Senate condemned the recognition of Abkhazia and South Ossetia.

In April 2013, Foreign Minister Karel Schwarzenberg said after meeting with his Georgian counterpart Maia Panjikidze that Russia respected only a state "that is larger" and therefore the Czech Republic could not mediate between Russia and Georgia. As for Georgia's future with regard to the occupied territories, the Czech Foreign Minister said Georgia should maintain contacts with them. "It is difficult when your territories are occupied, but sometimes you have to wait for years, even decades before the window of possibilities will be opened for you. I do not know when that time will come, but it will necessarily come", he said.

=== Japan ===
According to the October 2014 Joint Statement between Japan and Georgia on "Solidarity for Peace and Democracy": "Both sides shared the view that peaceful resolution to the conflict in Georgia's occupied regions of Abkhazia and Tskhinvali region/South Ossetia in line with the principles of sovereignty and territorial integrity of Georgia within its internationally recognized borders are essential for the peace and stability of the country and the entire South Caucasus region". Japan's position on "Georgia's occupied regions of Tskhinvali region/South Ossetia and Abkhazia" was reaffirmed in the 1 March 2017 statement by the Embassy of Japan in Georgia.

=== Lithuania ===
In November 2009, Audronius Ažubalis, Lithuanian Parliamentarian, stated that in 1999 Russia committed to fully withdraw its armed forces from Moldova and Georgia at the Istanbul Summit. "Unfortunately, these essential commitments have not been fully implemented, even ten years later: the so-called Russian "peacekeepers" are still dislocated in the Moldovan region of Transnistria, Russia has occupied a part of the Georgian territory: Abkhazia and South Ossetia Regions. Russian military infrastructure is being actively developed in these Georgian regions."

The first European country to officially recognise Abkhazia and South Ossetia as Georgian territories under Russian military occupation, became Romania. The Lithuanian Seimas adopted a resolution condemning Russian occupation of Georgian territories on 1 June 2010. The resolution said that Russia's use of the local puppet regimes to control the regions constituted a violation of international law.

On the fifth anniversary of Russo-Georgian war in 2013, a protest was held in Vilnius to support Georgia's territorial integrity. Georgian Parliamentary Vice-Speaker Giorgi Baramidze attended the rally. He addressed the protesters, finishing his speech in Lithuanian: "Long live free Lithuania's, long live free Georgia!"

In March 2014, Lithuanian ambassador to the United States, Žygimantas Pavilionis said in an interview for the LRT TV programme Savaitė, that after the Russo-Georgian War everyone in Brussels "laughed about Lithuania's position". He said that "... at that time, the Western world forgot and forgave Russia for what it did in Georgia – occupied a large part of its territory, and is still keeping it." In July 2014, Žygimantas Pavilionis said that when Russia occupied the Georgian territories, "... Lithuanian diplomats were the only ones in Europe and, I dare say, in Lithuania who constantly tried to defend a free Georgia to the end."

In July 2014, Foreign Minister Linas Antanas Linkevičius said that Lithuania must maintain a dialogue with the government of Belarus, noting that Western leaders met with Russian President Vladimir Putin, despite the Russo-Ukrainian war. He admitted that there were "bad things" in Belarus, but noted that Minsk had not recognized Russia's occupation of Ukrainian and Georgian territories. "Belarus, nevertheless, has not recognized the Crimean occupation, the occupation of Southern Ossetia and Abkhazia. And that's a certain position. It's our neighbor and economic partner," Linkevičius said.

=== United States ===
In June 2010, the White House published its report on the U.S.-Russia relations, where it called on Russia to end its occupation of the Georgian territories of Abkhazia and South Ossetia.

Secretary of State Hillary Clinton said that Russia is occupying parts of Georgia and building permanent military bases in contravention of the truce during a visit to Tbilisi in 2010. According to Russian news agencies, then Prime Minister of Russia Vladimir Putin commented on this statement, saying that "They [Georgians] mustn't seek solutions outside," and "It's necessary to conduct a dialogue without citing third parties." Putin also stressed that Russia was not the occupier, but only "liberated" Abkhazia and South Ossetia.

In August 2010, the U.S. Department of State said that they were not surprised by reports that Russia deployed S-300 air-defense systems on the territory of Abkhazia. "I believe it's our understanding that Russia has had S-300 missiles in Abkhazia for the past two years," the department's assistant secretary, Philip J. Crowley, said. "There have been systems in Abkhazia for two years. We can't confirm whether they [Russia] have added to those systems or not... this is by itself is not necessarily a new development. That system has been in place for some time," he continued.

In March 2011, U.S. Assistant Secretary of State for European and Eurasian Affairs Philip H. Gordon said that use of term "occupied" by Washington in reference to Abkhazia and South Ossetia was not meant to be a "provocation" but a description of situation on the ground.

In July 2011 the U.S. Senate unanimously approved a resolution introduced by U.S. Senators Jeanne Shaheen (D-NH) and Lindsey Graham (R-SC) affirming U.S. support for the sovereignty, independence, and territorial integrity of the country of Georgia and calling upon Russia to remove its occupying forces from Abkhazia and South Ossetia. The resolution states that "finding a peaceful resolution to the conflict is a key priority for the United States in the Caucasus region and that lasting regional stability can only be achieved through peaceful means and long-term diplomatic and political dialogue between all parties." Graham said that "Russia's invasion of Georgian land in 2008 was an act of aggression not only to Georgia, but to all new democracies." In response, the Russian Foreign Ministry said that the resolution was "no more than PR move" and claimed that it encouraged "revanchist sentiments" on the part of Georgia. Russian President Dmitry Medvedev told Russian media outlets that the U.S. Senate resolution reflected only the "views of some of its senile members".

In August 2013, United States Ambassador to Georgia Richard Norland issued a statement where he said: "There is no place in the modern world for building a new Berlin wall."

In September 2013, the U.S. Embassy in Tbilisi expressed concern over "borderization" activities in Georgia along the administrative boundary lines of Russian-occupied territories of Abkhazia and South Ossetia. The statement called for the barriers "to be removed in accordance with Russia's commitments under the August 2008 cease-fire agreement and its obligations under international humanitarian law".

In October 2013, U.S. State Department spokeswoman Marie Harf denounced the erection of fences and other physical barriers by Russian security forces along the administrative boundary lines of the occupied territories of Georgia.

In late February 2014, when tensions between Ukraine and Russia escalated, U.S. Secretary of State John Kerry denounced Russia's continued military presence in Abkhazia and South Ossetia in violation of the ceasefire, saying: "We continue to object to Russia's occupation, militarisation and borderisation of Georgian territory, and we call on Russia to fulfil its obligations under the 2008 ceasefire agreement, including the withdrawal of forces and free access for humanitarian assistance."

On 7 June 2014, the White House announced $5 million aid for Georgia that would help people living near the border with Russia and "increase access to objective information by populations in the occupied territories of Abkhazia and South Ossetia".

In September 2014, the U.S. Secretary of Defense Chuck Hagel visited Georgia. Speaking at a news conference after meeting with the Georgian Defense Minister, Hagel hailed Georgia's new status as an enhanced NATO partner and Georgia's drive to become a NATO member. "Russia's actions here [in Georgia] and in Ukraine pose a long-term challenge that the United States and our allies take very seriously," he said. Hagel called on Russia to "fully withdraw its forces from Georgia's borders" and hailed "the restraint Georgia has shown".

In May 2017, U.S. President Donald Trump signed the Consolidated Appropriations Act, 2017, which includes a provision that no appropriated funds may be used to support "the Russian occupation of the Georgian territories of Abkhazia and Tskhinvali Region/South Ossetia" or to assist the governments of other countries that have recognized the two territories' independence. The August 2017 Countering America's Adversaries Through Sanctions Act, inter alia, made reference to Russia's "illegal occupation of South Ossetia and Abkhazia in Georgia" and its disregard of "the terms of the August 2008 ceasefire agreement".

=== Romania ===
On 28 June 2010, the Senate of Romania adopted a resolution on the situation in Georgia, reaffirming its support for Georgia's territorial integrity and recognizing the regions of Abkhazia and South Ossetia as integral parts of Georgia. The Senate condemned the recognition of Georgia's breakaway regions by a number of countries and emphasized the necessity of complying with the six-point ceasefire agreement of 12 August 2008. The Romanian Senate supported the Georgian Government's strategy with respect to the occupied territories. It condemned the continuation of the policy of changing the ethnic composition in the two regions and insisted on ensuring the unhindered return of refugees.

In March 2014, the President of Romania Traian Băsescu at the presentation of the Defence Ministry's annual report declared: "We can no longer see the incidents of 2008, when the Russian Federation occupied Abkhazia and South Ossetia, as isolated occurrences. Ukraine was next, so all politicians and all military strategists are bound to ask, who will follow. Could it be Transdniestr, could it be the Republic of Moldova? These are questions anyone may ask. The unpredictability of the Russian Federation prompts us to look at various scenarios and response options."

President Băsescu told Realitatea TV broadcaster on 13 April 2014, "The Russian forces control the Black Sea almost in its entirety, through controlling all these frozen conflicts." He also said that "In Transnistria they occupy Moldovan territory, in Crimea they occupy Ukrainian territory, in Georgia they occupy Georgian territory, South Ossetia and Abkhazia..."

=== France ===
French Foreign Minister Bernard Kouchner said during a visit to Tbilisi in July 2010 that "Abkhazia and South Ossetia are integral parts of Georgia and Russia should withdraw its troops from those territories." He also said that "the term 'occupation' cannot solve the problems between Georgia and Russia" while answering questions from journalists.

In August that year, when it was announced that S-300 systems were placed in Abkhazia to protect the airspace of Abkhazia and South Ossetia, French Foreign Ministry said their deployment undermined stability in the region. "We are concerned about [Russia's] announcement about the deployment of air defense systems in Abkhazia and South Ossetia. It [deployment] harms stability in the region," a spokeswoman told a news conference in Paris.

In October 2011, President Nicolas Sarkozy visited Georgia. He addressed some 30,000 people gathered on Freedom Square in Tbilisi. Sarkozy accused Russia of violating the ceasefire that he brokered. "France will not resign itself to a 'fait accompli'," he said, with Georgian president looking on. "I would like to reiterate here my commitment to watch over the enforcement of the accord."

In May 2014, President François Hollande had three-day trip to South Caucasus countries and finished by visiting Georgia on 13 May. Speaking at a joint news conference with his Georgian counterpart Giorgi Margvelashvili, he said that Georgia's territories remain occupied and the cease-fire agreement is not fully respected. "France did everything for the agreement to be reached and the conflict to stop. However we see today that occupation still exists and Georgia still has to regain territorial integrity," Hollande said while speaking about the 2008 Georgia-Russia war.

=== Estonia ===
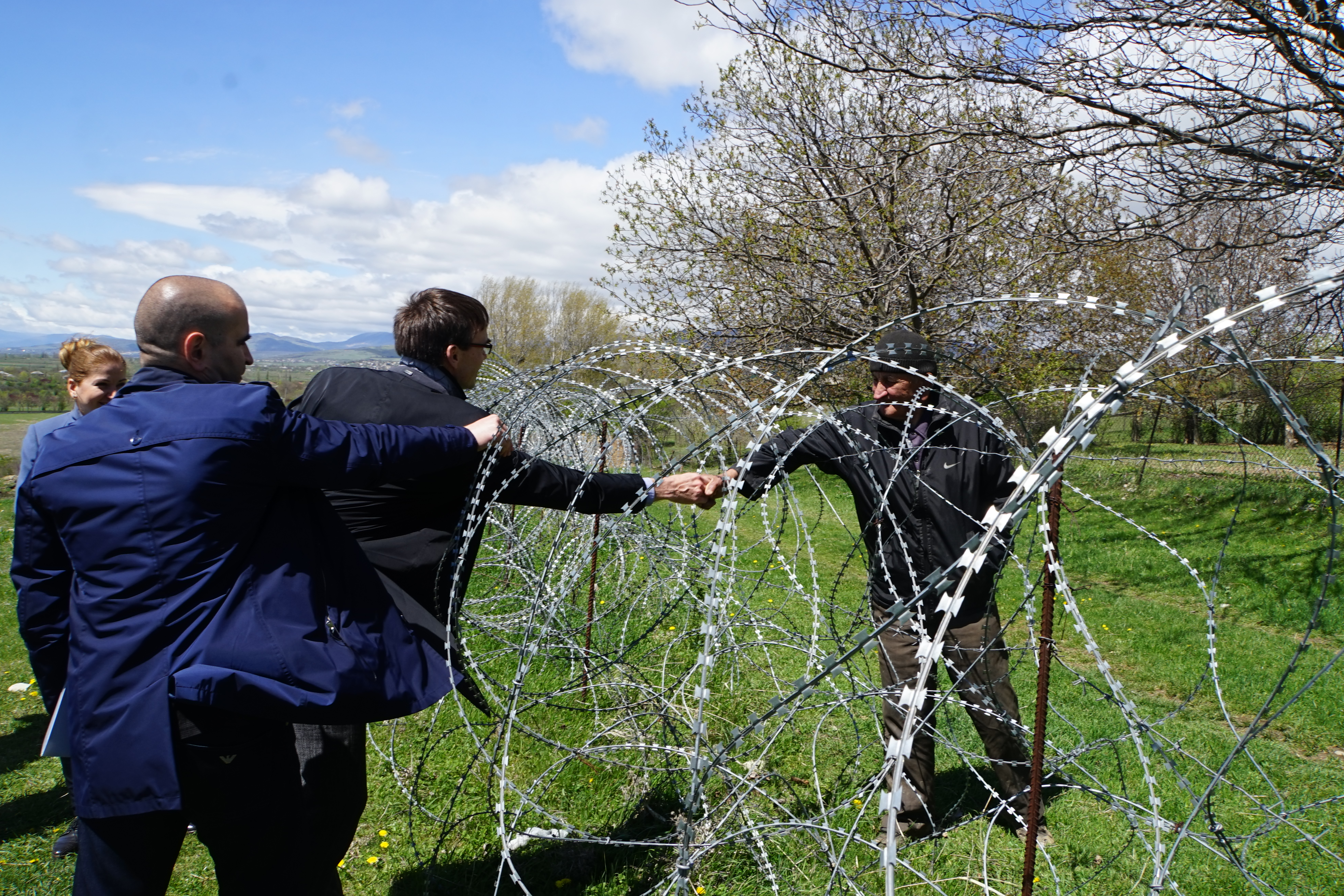
Foreign Minister of Estonia, Sven Mikser, greeting a Georgian man left behind a barbwire fence installed by the Russian military at the village of Khurvaleti in April 2017.

On 8 August 2010, the Estonia-Georgia Parliamentary Group of the Riigikogu released a statement on the second anniversary of Russian aggression against Georgia. The Estonia-Georgia Parliamentary Group expressed its concern that a part of the Georgian territory was under occupation, the internally displaced persons from Abkhazia and South Ossetia could not return to the places of their permanent residence, and representatives of the international organizations and humanitarian missions could not access the occupied regions. Estonia reaffirmed its respect to the sovereignty and territorial integrity of Georgia.

In September 2012, The Wall Street Journal published an article by the Estonian defense minister Urmas Reinsalu, titled "Georgian Democracy and Russian Meddling". Reinsalu argued: "In Tallinn—and hopefully in Brussels, Paris and Washington as well—we are trying to understand what Russia expects to gain by occupying Georgian territory. Does the Kremlin believe that a country is excluded from NATO membership just because a fifth of its territory is occupied? Did Russian officials not hear when on two recent occasions, most recently at May's NATO Summit in Chicago, that Georgia was assured of admission into NATO?"

In October 2013, President Toomas Hendrik Ilves attended opening of the wine international festival in Moldova. He assessed Russian activities along the occupation line in Georgia as a "blatant" violation of international law.

In late August 2014, Estonian foreign minister Urmas Paet said that the so-called presidential elections in occupied Abkhazia on 24 August was illegal. "Recognising these elections would mean legitimising a military occupation. This is unacceptable," he said.

=== Sweden ===
In April 2011, Foreign Minister Carl Bildt said in an interview: "The Russian occupation of Abkhazia and South Ossetia is going to be there for quite some time to come. So it's important that we from the European side keep our position or principle toward integrity of Georgia. But we shouldn't be under illusions that we can change things very fast."

=== Spain ===
During his visit to Georgia in May 2012, Josep Antoni Duran i Lleida, the Chair of the Foreign Affairs Committee at the Spanish Congress of Deputies, called on Georgian citizens not to allow the Russian military exercises, named "Kavkaz 2012", to influence the parliamentary elections in October 2012. On behalf of Spain, he expressed the support for Georgia's territorial integrity and condemned the Russian occupation.

=== Suriname ===
An official delegation of Suriname visited the village of Dvani to see the "borderization" in October 2013. Jennifer Simons, chairperson of the National Assembly of Suriname, said that they had some information regarding the situation in Georgia, but what they saw with their own eyes "is beyond all expectations".

=== Poland ===
In May 2014, Prime Minister Donald Tusk said that the idea of the Eastern Partnership was to bring some countries closer to the European Union. "The main task has been completed, but the context has changed dramatically", he said. The Prime Minister said that Ukraine had already signed the political agreement with the EU and the association agreements would soon be signed with Moldova and Georgia. "Consequently the most difficult stage is behind us", he said. "At the same time, Europe must answer the question what to do with this new and dramatic challenge", Prime Minister said. "Namely the fact that the three countries associated with the EU will be countries whose territory is, in fact, partially occupied. Ukraine has lost Crimea, Georgia has a problem with Abkhazia and Ossetia, and Moldova with Transnistria. This may indeed build a permanent crisis element into the EU-Russia relations", he said.

=== Canada ===
In its June 2018 statement condemning Syria's recognition of Abkhazia and South Ossetia, Global Affairs Canada described the two entities as "Russian-occupied regions of Abkhazia and South Ossetia in Georgia", adding that "Russia's occupation of these regions is a clear violation of international law that infringes on Georgia's sovereignty and territorial integrity."

=== Organizations ===
==== European Union ====
In February 2009, the Czech Presidency of the EU announced that the European Union was "... seriously concerned about the plans announced by the Russian Federation to build up its military presence in the Georgian regions of Abkhazia and South Ossetia without the consent of the Government of Georgia".

On 23 June 2009, Ivan Počuch opened Annual Security Review Conference in Vienna by statement on behalf of the European Union. He said: "The EU reiterates its firm support for the sovereignty and territorial integrity of Georgia within its internationally recognized borders. [...] The EU remains deeply concerned by the signing of the agreements between Russia and the Georgian separatist regions of Abkhazia and South Ossetia on the joint protection of the so called borders and by the subsequent deployment of Russian border-guards. [...] The EU remains equally concerned about the decision announced by the Russian Federation to build up its military presence in these Georgian regions without the consent of the Government of Georgia. Such initiatives are in contradiction with the spirit of the ceasefire agreements and jeopardise stability and security in the region by further increasing tensions."

In May 2013, Andrzej Tyszkiewicz, the head of EUMM, commented on the installation of fences in Georgia. He said that "EUMM has observed an increase in the construction of fences and obstacles, which has a negative impact on the local population." "The freedom of movement of communities living in areas adjacent to the Administrative Boundary Lines is a key priority for EUMM," Tyszkiewicz continued. "The installation of fences impedes people's livelihood and divides families and communities. This is unacceptable."

On 1 October 2013, the spokesperson of Catherine Ashton, High Representative of the Union for Foreign Affairs and Security Policy, issued a statement saying that the High Representative was calling on the Russian Federation to remove the barriers installed along administrative boundary lines in Georgia.

In October 2013, after meeting Mikheil Saakashvili in Brussels, José Manuel Barroso, European Commission president, condemned the "borderization". "The EU firmly condemns the erection of fences and barriers on Georgia's internal administrative boundaries, in breach of the 2008 ceasefire agreements," Barroso said. "This has a directly negative impact on the local populations."

In November 2013, European Commission mentioned the term "occupied territories" in the report to describe Abkhazia and South Ossetia.

On 30 April 2014, EU issued a statement on the Council of Europe Secretary General's ninth consolidated report on the conflict in Georgia. The EU supported the independence, sovereignty and territorial integrity of Georgia and expressed its concern about the Russian military and security related presence and infrastructure reinforcements in Abkhazia and South Ossetia. The EU believed "... that a clear commitment by Russia on non-use of force is necessary". It also called for "... the full implementation of the ceasefire agreement of 12 August 2008 and of the 8 September Implementing Measures of the six-point agreement, including providing the EU Monitoring Mission with access to the breakaway regions". The EU called to ensure freedom of movement across the ABL. The release of three journalists, imprisoned on 15 April, was welcomed. The EU was concerned by the fact that the Council of Europe was not allowed to enter Abkhazia and South Ossetia in the course of preparing the report.

===== European Parliament =====
On 20 May 2010, European Parliament adopted a resolution on the need for an EU strategy for the South Caucasus where it stressed "... the importance of protecting the safety and rights of all people living within the breakaway regions, of promoting respect for ethnic Georgians' right of return under safe and dignified conditions, of stopping the process of forced passportisation, of achieving a reduction of the de facto closed borders, of obtaining possibilities for the EU and other international actors to assist people within the two regions". It also called on Russia to honour its obligation to withdraw its troops to the positions held before August 2008, and noted "... with concern the agreement of 17 February 2010 between the Russian Federation and the de facto authorities of Abkhazia to establish a Russian military base in Abkhazia without the consent of the Government of Georgia and notes that such an agreement is in contradiction with the Ceasefire Agreements of 12 August and 8 September 2008".

On 20 January 2011, European Parliament adopted a new strategy for the Black Sea. The document pointed out that "... human rights violations are a daily occurrence in occupied South Ossetia and Abkhazia". It also called on the High Representative of the Union for Foreign Affairs and Security Policy "... to step up efforts to encourage Russia to comply with the six-point Sarkozy Plan to stabilise and resolve the conflict in Georgia".

A document adopted by the European Parliament in March 2011 condemned Russian military presence in Abkhazia and South Ossetia, calling it "non-mandated presence of the Russian military troops in the occupied regions of Georgia". The document also mentions ethnic cleansing of Georgians, non-fulfillment of the ceasefire agreement of 12 August 2008, and talks about the necessity to deploy international peacekeeping forces. It also condemned the decision of the joint Russian-Abkhaz Commission on Property Rights that violated Georgian IDPs' right to claim their property in Abkhazia.

In October 2011, in an official European Parliament document, Georgia's regions of Abkhazia and South Ossetia (Tskhinvali region) were called occupied territories. Russian recognition of those regions and Russian military presence in both Abkhazia and South Ossetia in violation of the fundamental norms and principles of international law was criticised.

On 17 November 2011, European Parliament passed the resolution where Abkhazia and South Ossetia were recognized as occupied territories. The resolution noted that Russia continued "... to occupy the Georgian regions of Abkhazia and the Tskhinvali region/ South Ossetia, in violation of the fundamental norms and principles of international law; whereas ethnic cleansing and forcible demographic changes have taken place in the areas under the effective control of the occupying force, which bears the responsibility for human rights violations in these areas." The resolution asks Russia to live up to the ceasefire agreement signed in 2008 and to guarantee EUMM full unlimited access to Abkhazia and South Ossetia. The resolution also called on Russia "... to reverse its recognition of the separation of the Georgian regions of Abkhazia and the Tskhinvali region/ South Ossetia, to end the occupation of those Georgian territories and to fully respect the sovereignty and territorial integrity of Georgia as well as the inviolability of its internationally recognised borders as provided for by international law, the UN Charter, the Final Act of the Helsinki Conference on Security and Cooperation in Europe and the relevant United Nations Security Council resolutions."

In February 2014, European Parliament adopted the resolution regarding EU-Russia summit. The EP members condemned Russian actions in the occupied territories of Abkhazia and South Ossetia, in particular "the process of borderisation around Abkhazia and the Tskhinvali region / South Ossetia, which has led to the expansion of the area of occupied territories, to the detriment of Georgia".

On 2 April 2014, Hannes Swoboda, leader of the Progressive Alliance of Socialists and Democrats, visited the village of Khurvaleti to see the situation on the ground. He personally talked with Davit Vanishvili, resident of the village, who had been threatened by the Russian forces. Swoboda told journalists: "I am deeply concerned about new facts of borderization. Instead avoiding the tension, and making relations more human, new facts of borderization are observed here that contradicts the agreement with Russia."

On 17 April 2014, the European Parliament adopted a resolution about Russian pressure on Eastern Partnership countries. The resolution, which called on the EU-member states to consider strengthening sanctions against Russia for its support of rebels in eastern Ukraine, also mentioned Georgia's occupied regions, saying that Russia "... is still occupying the Georgian regions of Abkhazia and Tskhinvali / South Ossetia, in violation of the fundamental norms and principles of international law". The resolution said that under the effective control of the occupying power there had been ethnic cleansing and forced demographic changes in Abkhazia and South Ossetia, and Russia bore responsibility for human rights violations. The resolution also declared that Georgia, Moldova and Ukraine "... have a European perspective and may apply to become members of the Union provided that they adhere to the principles of democracy, respect fundamental freedoms and human and minority rights and ensure the rule of law".

==== NATO ====
In November 2010, NATO Parliamentary Assembly adopted a resolution containing the terms "occupied territories" and "ethnic cleansing" referring to Russian military presence and actions in Abkhazia and South Ossetia. NATO parliamentarians urged Russia "to reverse" the results of ethnic cleansing and allow the "safe and dignified" return of all internally displaced persons to their homes. The Resolution condemned the tightening by Russian FSB Border Troops of procedures for crossing the Administrative Border Line, enhancement of Russia's military presence on the occupied territories as well as Russia's blocking of the extension of the OSCE and UN missions in Georgia. It urged Russia to allow EUMM unimpeded access to the entire territory of Georgia. NATO Parliamentary Assembly also welcomed Georgia's State Strategy on Occupied Territories and the Action Plan for Engagement.

In late June 2013, NATO Secretary General Anders Fogh Rasmussen during his visit to Georgia said that the fence-building by the Russian troops "impedes freedom of movement" and could "further inflame tensions" in the region.

In September 2013, James Appathurai, the NATO Secretary General's Special Representative for the Caucasus and Central Asia, expressed concern on his Facebook page about the construction of fences.

On 2 October 2013, Secretary-General Anders Fogh Rasmussen expressed concern over Moscow's activities to install fences along the administrative boundary lines of Abkhazia and South Ossetia. He called for the removal of the barriers, which he said effect "the lives of those citizens of Georgia who live on either side of the administrative boundary lines". He also stated that the erection of the barriers "is in contradiction with Russia's international commitments and does not contribute to a peaceful resolution of the conflict."

On 5 February 2014, NATO criticized Russia for expanding its border deeper into Georgia's region of Abkhazia, a move Moscow had portrayed as a temporary step to expand a security zone around the Sochi Winter Olympics. "We have noted the recent decision to temporarily extend the so-called border zone of Abkhazia further into Georgian territory without the Georgian government's consent," NATO Secretary General Anders Fogh Rasmussen said. "We are very concerned about that decision," he told a news conference in Brussels.

==== OSCE ====
The OSCE Parliamentary Assembly held its annual session in Monaco on 9 July 2012. It passed a resolution supporting Georgia, and referring to breakaway Abkhazia and South Ossetia as occupied territories. The resolution urged the Government and the Parliament of the Russian Federation, and the de facto authorities of Abkhazia and South Ossetia to allow the European Union Monitoring Mission access to the occupied territories. It also said that the OSCE Parliamentary Assembly was "concerned about the humanitarian situation of the displaced persons both in Georgia and in the occupied territories of Abkhazia, Georgia, and South Ossetia, Georgia, as well as the denial of the right of return to their places of living". Russian Foreign Ministry reacted harshly, saying that "the majority of deputies in the Assembly (parliamentary Assembly of the OSCE) once again don't wish to objectively accept the realities of the situation today in the Caucasus."

On 26 October 2013, Ignacio Sánchez Amor, Special Representative of the OSCE Parliamentary Assembly on Border Co-operation, visited the villages of Ditsi and Didi Khurvaleti in Gori Municipality. He expressed his regret regarding the establishment of physical obstacles along the administrative borders. "I call on the involved authorities to stop this process immediately and to remove the barbwire which prevents the residents in the area from living a normal daily life and contravenes the principle of the territorial integrity of Georgia," he said. "It is sad to see ordinary people being exposed to such hardship." Ignacio Sánchez Amor again visited the administrative boundary line on 14 May 2014 and condemned the continuing negative effect of a "fake" border on the local population.

Parliamentarians of the OSCE states met in annual session in Baku on 28 June to 2 July 2014. Among numerous decisions, the OSCE Parliamentary Assembly also called on the Russian Federation to fulfil the commitments under the 12 August 2008 ceasefire agreement to de-occupy the Georgian territory and to respect the principles of international law.

==== Council of Europe ====
In 2013, the Parliamentary Assembly of the Council of Europe adopted a resolution, expressing its concern over the humanitarian consequences of 2008 war. The Assembly also called for granting "... full and unimpeded access to the European Monitoring Mission in Georgia (EUMM) to the former conflict zones that are now occupied".

In September 2013, the co-rapporteurs of the Parliamentary Assembly for Georgia, Michael Aastrup Jensen and Boris Tsilevitch, expressed their concern about the resumption of the building of fences and other physical obstacles by Russian border guards along the administrative boundaries. They were also concerned that in several places these obstacles were constructed deep into Georgian-controlled territories, thus the de facto boundaries were being moved.

In January 2014, the EPP/CD Group at the Parliamentary Assembly expressed its concern over the "borderization" campaign and condemned the seizure of additional land and expulsion of tens of civilians from their homes.

In early April 2014, the Council of Europe adopted a resolution that condemned Russian aggression against Ukraine and annexation of Crimea. The council's assembly withdrew the voting rights of Russia's 18-member delegation until the end of 2014. The resolution was adopted by 145 votes to 21, with 22 abstentions. The resolution also criticised Russia for its military presence in Abkhazia and South Ossetia, saying that the Russian Federation failed to implement CoE Resolutions 1633 (2008), 1647 (2009) and 1683 (2009) on the consequences of the Russo-Georgian war and Russian troops still occupy the Georgian provinces of Abkhazia and South Ossetia. The Assembly also criticised the refusal of the Russian Federation to allow EU monitors and to reverse ethnic cleansing.

During its 1198th meeting held on 29–30 April 2014, the Deputies of the Committee of Ministers of the Council of Europe discussed the ninth Consolidated Report on the Conflict in Georgia, which was prepared by the Secretary General, Thorbjørn Jagland. The Council of Europe's member states positively assessed the Consolidated Report and supported the practice of submitting the Secretary General's consolidated reports in future. Only the representatives of Russia questioned the effectiveness of the Secretary General's consolidated reports. The Deputies supported the territorial integrity of Georgia. They expressed their concern regarding the installation of barbwire fences and other artificial obstacles by Russia and stressed the need of the de-installation of obstacles.

==== United Nations ====
On 21 May 2014, UN High Commissioner for Human Rights Navi Pillay said at a press conference in Tbilisi that South Ossetia was "one of the most inaccessible places on earth". She noted that "Since May 2013, barb wired fences, additional watch towers and other monitoring equipment have been set up by Russian guards along a stretch of more than 50 kilometres of the Administrative Boundary Line of South Ossetia." She said that she saw the "devastating" effect of this fence on local villagers. Pillay declared that South Ossetia became "a black hole". She highlighted the case of one 80-year-old man, Davit Vanishvili, whose house is surrounded by the barb wire and called him a "very brave" man.

=== Joint declarations ===
==== Lithuania and Poland ====
In November 2008, President of Lithuania Valdas Adamkus and President of Poland Lech Kaczyński issued a joint declaration on the withdrawal of Russian troops from Georgia. They acknowledged "... that the 12 August ceasefire agreement has not yet been fully implemented, in particular with respect to the points concerning Russian troops' withdrawal to pre-conflict positions and free access to humanitarian aid, as it was agreed between the European and Russian leaderships". They said that "... OSCE as well as EU observers should be allowed in the occupied Georgian territories of Abkhazia and South Ossetia". The Presidents stressed that the "... deployment and continuous increase of Russian troops in Georgia, including Abkhazia and Tskhinvali region/South Ossetia, undermine the peace building efforts in Georgia sponsored by the European Union and other international agencies". The Presidents called on the international community and the EU governments to demand full and unconditional withdrawal of Russian troops from Georgian territory in compliance with the 12 August ceasefire agreement.

==== GUAM and Baltic Assembly ====
GUAM Organization logo

Baltic Assembly logo

The GUAM Parliamentary Assembly, Baltic Assembly and the representatives of the Parliament of Poland participated in the 6th Session of the GUAM Parliamentary Assembly held on 2–3 December 2013 in Tbilisi. They adopted the Joint Statement, where they underlined the significance of the Eastern Partnership initiative. They "... outlined with regret that, recently, acts and attempts encouraging aggressive separatism and legitimization of occupation have become more frequent (illegal visits of officials to the conflict regions and occupied territories; visits of separatist leaders to certain capitals; illegal economic and other activities in the conflict regions and occupied territories; illegal setting of artificial barriers/barbwire fences along the occupation line in the Tskhinvali and Abkhazia regions of Georgia) and called upon the respective parties to stop actions that are incompatible with international law and undertaken obligations."

==== EU and Georgia ====
EU – Georgia Parliamentary Cooperation Committee (PCC) held its sixteenth meeting under the co-chairmanship of Tinatin Khidasheli and Milan Cabrnoch in Tbilisi on 25–26 March 2014. It adopted the statement where the European aspirations of Georgia was recognised. It also called for the safe and dignified return of all IDPs to the occupied territories of Abkhazia and Tskhinvali region/ South Osetia and reiterated that forced demographic change was unacceptable.

== In media ==
Many international journalists and media companies, such as Le Figaro, Fox News, Radio Free Europe/Radio Liberty, Al Jazeera, Financial Times, The Washington Post, Forbes, The New York Times, Fortune, Der Spiegel, USA Today, Associated Press and Deutsche Welle have referred to Abkhazia and South Ossetia as Russian-occupied territories.

In August 2011, British ex-MP Bruce George published an article in which he referred to Abkhazia and South Ossetia as territories "under the occupation of Russian troops".

In early February 2014, the former U.S. diplomat Matthew Bryza argued in The Wall Street Journal: "It is hard to see how the Sochi Games can advance the Olympic spirit of peace if Russian troops continue to occupy a country within range of a cross-country ski race from Olympic venues."

On 1 March 2014, EUobserver stated that Russia after the war "entrenched its occupation of South Ossetia and a second breakaway entity, Abkhazia, in what is widely seen as a way of blocking Georgia's EU and Nato aspirations".

In March 2014, Garry Kasparov, Russian chess Grandmaster and political activist, wrote:

"I noted that Putin's invasion of Georgia took place during the Beijing Olympiad in 2008 and wondered what would dissuade him from similar action in Ukraine since Russian troops still occupy South Ossetia and Abkhazia, Georgian territories, with no visible harm to Putin's international relations. By the way, Russia was never sanctioned by the European or the United States over Georgia, and just a few months after the brief war ended the EU restarted talks with Russia on a formal partnership and cooperation agreement."

Several analysts have suggested that Russia's occupation of internationally recognised Georgian territory serves as a check on Georgia's aspirations to join NATO.

== See also ==
- Community for Democracy and Rights of Nations
- 2008 Russo-Georgian diplomatic crisis
- Abkhazia–Georgia border
- International recognition of Abkhazia and South Ossetia
- Ethnic cleansing of Georgians in Abkhazia
- Ethnic cleansing of Georgians in South Ossetia
- Geneva International Discussions
- Georgia–South Ossetia border
- Military history of the Russian Federation
- Ministry of Internally Displaced Persons from the Occupied Territories, Accommodation and Refugees of Georgia
- Russian-occupied territories of Ukraine
- Transnistria (Russian-occupied Moldovan territory)
- Russian military presence in Transnistria
