= Estonians in Abkhazia =

Ethnic group in Abkhazia

Estonians in Abkhazian
Abhaasia eestlased
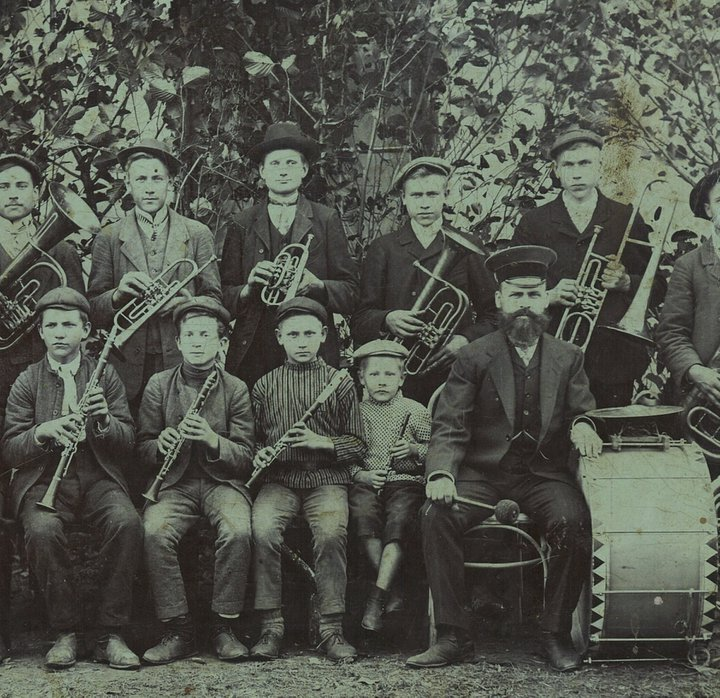
- The brass band of Sulevi (1910)

Total population
- <500 (2008, est.)

Regions with significant populations
- Gagra District; Sukhumi

Languages
- Estonian; Russian; Abkhaz

Religion
- Lutheranism; Eastern Orthodox

Estonians in Abkhazia (Estonian: Abhaasia eestlased) are one of the smallest minorities residing in Abkhazia. (Note: The political status of Abkhazia is disputed. Having unilaterally declared independence from Georgia in 1992, Abkhazia is formally recognised as an independent state by 4 UN member states (three other states previously recognised it but then withdrew their recognition), while the remainder of the international community recognizes it as de jure Georgian territory. Georgia continues to claim the area as its own territory, designating it as Russian-occupied territory.) Estonians settled in Abkhazia mostly in the late 19th century, attracted by promises of free land and dissatisfaction with previous settlements elsewhere in the Russian Empire. Today most live in Gagra and Sukhumi but many have left due to the Georgian-Abkhazian conflict of 1992–1993.

== History ==
Settlement of Estonians to South Caucasus began after the Circassian genocide and annexation of the Principality of Abkhazia following the Caucasian War and the Russo-Turkish War (1877–1878). The Russian authorities didn't trust the local Muslim Abkhazians and sought to settle the area with Christian subjects. During this time the Baltic provinces faced problems of overpopulation, land shortages and tensions between the local Estonians and the land owning Baltic-Germans. Enactment of the Livonian Rural Municipality Act of 1863 made movement of peasants even easier with the issuing of internal passport. With the added addition of promotion by local newspapers, many Baltic settlers migrated across the Russian Empire.

=== 19th and early 20th century ===
Estonian settlement in Abkhazia began in late 19th century when articles by the journalist J. R. Rezoldt appeared in the Estonian newspapers like Eesti Postimees and Sakala promoting settlement in the Caucasus. In 1881, land surveyors Peeter Piir and Jaan Kilk designated a spot for settlement in the Sukhumi area. The village of Estonia was formally founded in 1882 by 27 Estonian families from Samara, followed by more wealthy families from Crimea, Stravopol and Estonia proper. The settlement was situated next to the Moldovan colony near Dranda, Mingrelian village of Pshapi and the Bulgarian-Russian colony of Vladimirovka. The initial settlement was very poor with people living in shacks with dirt floors and dealing with a malaria outbreak, which led some families to leave.

In 1884 there was a wave of Estonian migration to Abkhazia with the founding of Linda, Salme and Sulevi, with a lot of the settlers coming from Tallinn kreis and Pärnu kreis. In the spirit of the Estonian national awakening all three were named after characters from the Estonian national epic Kalevipoeg. In 1886, a village called Estosadok (Estonian: Eesti Aiake) was founded in Lesser Abkhazia, 4 km upstream from Krasnaya Polyana, the site of a massacre, where Russian forces massacred the local Abkhaz-Akhchipsou civilians.

As Estonians adjusted to their new life, it began to improve rapidly. Newspaper Virulane wrote: "The local governor visited the settlements here and highly praised the diligence, hard work and endurance of the Estonians, because most Estonians had lived there for only two years yet had already built good houses and orchards. This pleased the governor and he promised to provide horses for his poorer settlers from the crown, which has already happened". By 1887, the first church-school had been completed in the village of Estonia which operated as a school and a prayer house. A curate-schoolteacher named Johannes Pihlakas came from Smorodina, founding a library and an organ was ordered from the Estonian village of Livoonia (Russian: Новоурупское) in Krasnodar Krai. Estonian villages in the Caucasus were said to be the wealthier compared to those elsewhere, when the Sukhumi Farmers' Association was formed in 1898 and of the 70 founding members, 26 were Estonians, further 20 from the village of Estonia. A Lutheran church was built in Sukhumi in 1913-15 which attended to the local Estonians, Germans and Latvians.

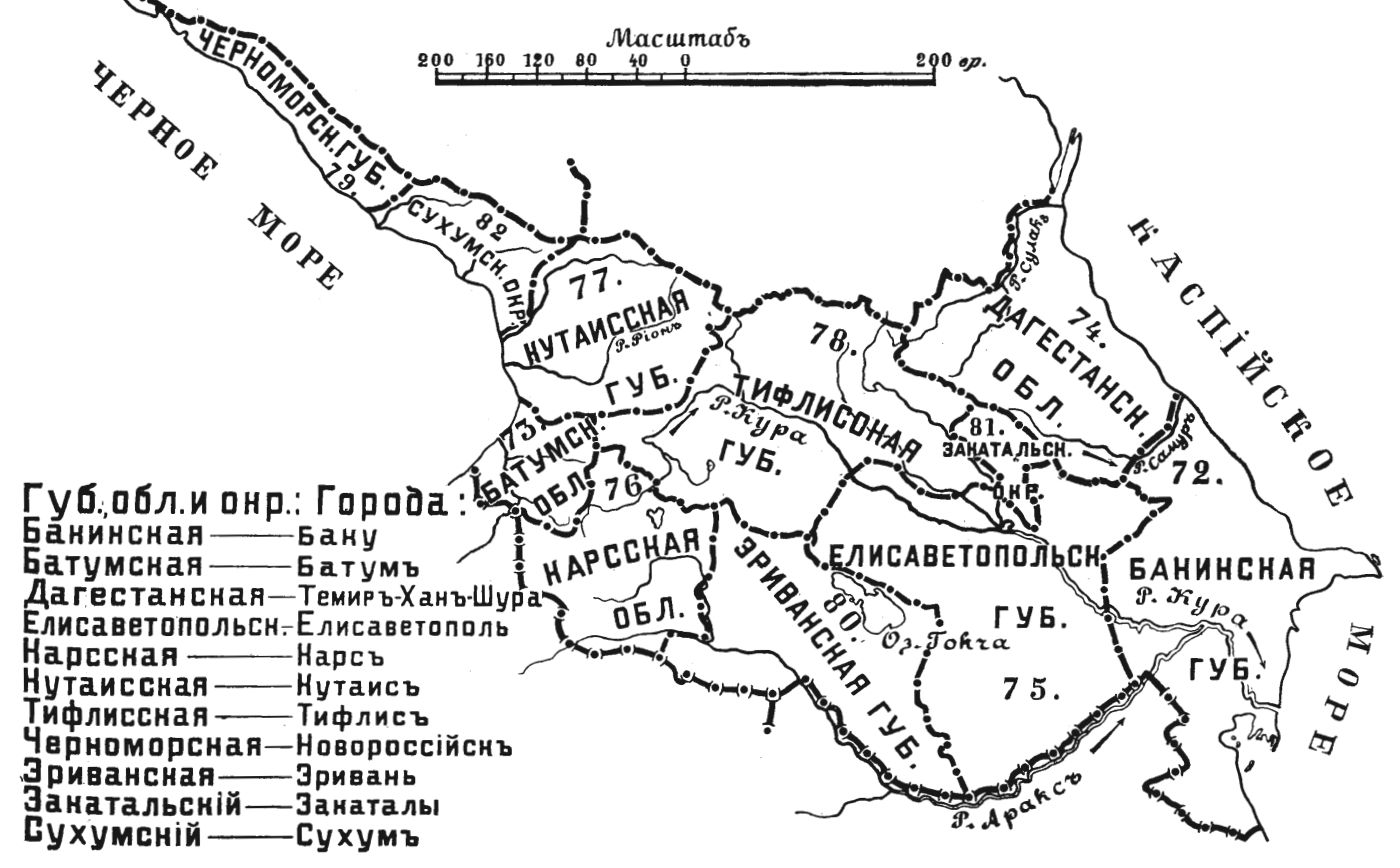
Estonians in Abkhazia were generally divided into those who lived in the Black Sea Governorate (nr 79) and the Sukhumi Okrug (nr 82)

The borders of the Black Sea Governorate were extended south to encompass the Gagra area in 1914. The Estonians in the area known colloquially as "Sochi Estonians" including the all-Estonian villages of Salme, Sulevi and Estosadok. Estonian settlers could also be found in: Vardane, Adler, Yermolovka (Estonian: Konnalinn) and Aibga. The Estonians in the Kutaisi Governorate known as "Sukhumi Estonians" lived in all-Estonian villages of Estonia and Linda (divided into Alam-Linda and Ülem-Linda). In 1919, the settlement of Kotkapesa was established close to Marhaul. Additional settling took place in Sukhumi and the German colony of Neudorf.

In 1914, an Estonian Song Festival was held in Sukhumi. This was attended by Estonians from all over the Russian Empire, including people from Abkhazia, Crimea, Kalmykia, Krasnodar, Tbilisi and Estonia.

Beginning of the World War I put increasing pressure on the Estonian villages in the Caucasus. Due to shortages and the rise of inflation there was a small boom of tobacco production. There was a sizable influx of refugees from the settlement of Uus-Estonia, near the city of Kars; being a major battlefront in the Caucasian theater.

=== Russian Revolution ===
Initially the Russian Revolution brought the Abkhazian People's Council to power. Established in 1917, the council, a national-political organization declared itself as the representative of the Abkhaz people on the grounds of self-determination. Estonians at the time generally didn't take sides, as they claimed to be citizens of the newly declared Republic of Estonia, though some took up arms in the pro-Bolsheviks uprising in Abkhazia. The uprising and the failure to unite Abkhazia with the Mountainous Republic of the Northern Caucasus led the Georgian forces, supported by Germany to invade Abkhazia in 1918. When the Georgian forces took over powers of the council were downgraded and Abkhaz leaders were accused of being pro-Turkish. When talks between the Abkhazian People's Council and Denikin's Whites came out, many delegates were arrested.

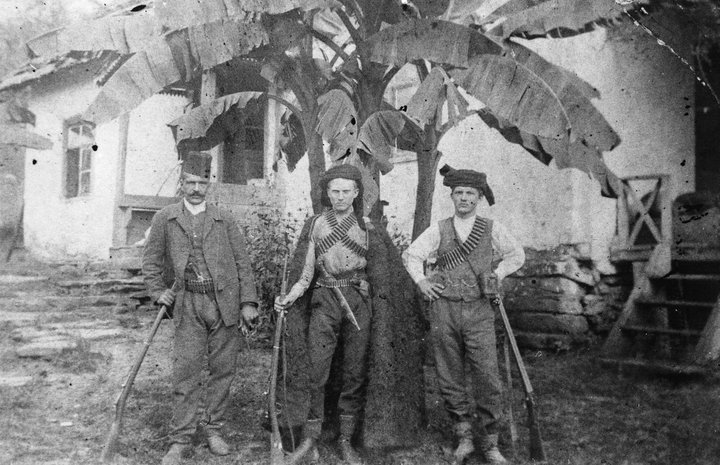
Hunters from the Sulev village (1920)

Abkhazian People's Council held scheduled elections in February 1919 in the newly created Abkhazian Autonomy. In the election 40 members were chosen, including the Estonian August Martin. August Martin, a schoolteacher born in to a Moravian family in Jõhvi, Estonia he was elected as a part of the Estonian Council (Estonian: Eesti Nõukogu) and maintained friendly relations with the fraction led by Samson Chanba. Despite the ethnic tensions on March 20 the Council adopted a declaration of Abkhaz autonomy within Georgia and renamed in May 1919 to the People’s Council of Abkhazia.

At the same time in February 1919, the armies of Denikin's White Russian government pushed the forces of the Democratic Republic of Georgia out of Sochi and Gagra. First clashes between Estonians and White Russian forces took place from March to April, 1919. Locals had faced the raiders before and Estonian partisans from Salme and Sulevi, headed by Villem Ludvik, conducted several skirmishes against the White Russian forces. In the early morning of May 17, 1919, the White Russians occupied the village of Sulevi. The Estonian partisans conducted a counter-attack from the Green army base in Mekhadiri, which the Whites forces pursued. In Mekhadiri the Whites forces took heavy casualties and retreated from Mekhadiri and Sulevi to Mikelrypsh. From there they were pushed further by a combined Georgian-Green force in January 1920.

To deal with Estonian matters, branch of the Executive Committee of the Soviet Estonia (Estonian: Eestimaa Nõukogude Täitevkomitee), with a sub-branch in Sukhumi and the Tbilisi Estonian People's Council (Estonian: Tiflisi Eesti Rahva Nõukogu) were set up in Tbilisi. They acted as de-facto embassies, mainly to prevent the mobilization of Estonians and to assist them in repatriating to Estonia. They were followed by the Tbilisi Estonian Consulate, during its operations from 1920-1921, 688 people were received and 366 given passports. Of these 387 citizens and 189 people with official Estonian passports lived in Abkhazia. With the signing of the Treaty of Tartu, the Estonian Repatriation Commission (Estonian: Eesti Kontroll-opteerimiskomisjon) was set up to further commission passports but due to distance both of these programs were limited.

=== Soviet era ===
The 1920 Treaty of Moscow demarcated clear border for the Soviet Republic of Abkhazia, leaving the Estonian villages on the western side of the river Psou, considered part of Lesser Abkhazia, into the Kuban-Black Sea Oblast. The Estonian department of the People's Commissariat of Nationalities operated in Estonian villages, helping recover peasant farms devastated by the war. In 1926, the Executive Committee of the Black Sea Okrug in its report noted the high level of agricultural production and standard of living among the Estonian settlers.

During the Stalin era Estonians became a suspected minority alleged to be spying for foreign powers. Dekulakization operations led to arrest and conviction of 55 Estonians, 37 of whom were sentenced to death and 18 who were sent to prison. The Estonian Lutheran congregations were shut down. The Estonian Operation of the NKVD led to 16 Estonians being convicted, 11 of them killed and 5 were imprisoned. Further 6 were placed on Stalin's shooting lists, all killed. Estonians arrested were alleged by the NKVD to have spied for either Estonia and/or Germany.

When World War II began many Estonians preemptively volunteered for the Red Army and fought in the Estonian Rifle Corps. Meanwhile Estonian kolkhozes allocated trucks and agricultural produce for the war, mostly run by women and the elderly. Estonians were also mobilized to build defensive works near Krasnaya Polyana. At the same the Caucasus experienced a wave of refugees from Moldova, Ukraine and other places.

After the war links with Estonia were reestablished and Estonian Song Festivals even saw delegations from Estonian choirs in Abkhazia. In 1972 the then Finnish President Urho Kekkonen visited the Estonian kolhoz "Druzhba" he reportedly said: "It was very interesting for us to visit the ‘Druzhba’ collective farm, where prosperous farmers live. Here you can hear their ancient native language, and the village, by all accounts, seems to be prosperous".

The Soviet period was generally characterized by an influx of Armenians (Abkhaz-Estonian: armenid) and Georgians to Estonian settlements and the rise of Russian usage as an everyday language. This was further exacerbated by urbanization and small influx of people returning to Estonia.

=== Abkhazia conflict 1989-2001 ===
During the war in Abkhazia, Estonian villages were hit especially hard. The Gagra landing destroyed many houses and roads in Estonian settlements in the north. It is also reported that some Estonians in Salme and Sulevi were mobilized by the Georgian army to build and man bridges and roads at the threat of force. Estonian communities in Sukhumi, Linda and Estonia (village) were hit the hardest due to the long Battle of Sukhumi. Since this area was under Georgian occupation the longest, many mobilized Estonians were pulled back to Georgia. After the retaking of Gagra many Estonians volunteered for the Bagramyan Battalion, which was mostly composed of Armenians. Estonian volunteers like Svetlana Holitš-Jakobson were awarded the Order of Leon.

The Estonian authorities conducted three evacuations, sending a Tupolev Tu-134A to Abkhazia in 1992 from October to November. The evacuated numbered around 170 people though mostly from Sukhumi, Linda and Estonia (village). Besides the air-evacuations, according to the Estonian Citizenship and Migration Board from 1992 to 2001 around 570 people have arrived in Estonia from Abkhazia including family members and relatives of the previous evacuees.

=== Present day ===
Estonians currently constitute a small minority in Abkhazia with most young people moving to Estonia. A 2008 estimate suggested there were around 500 Estonians left in the country, numbering around 0.2% of the population of Abkhazia.

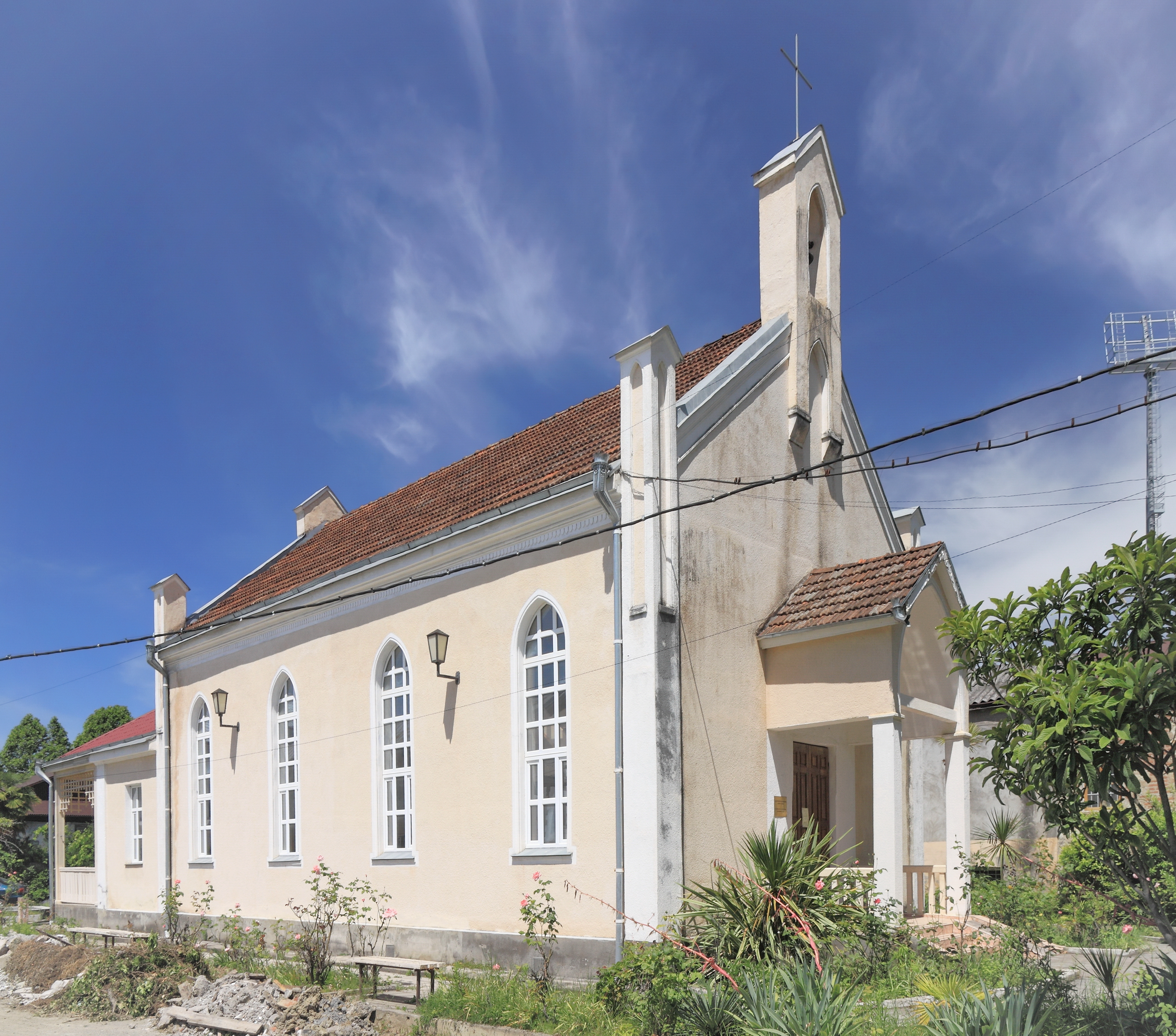
Sukhumi St. John's Lutheran Church

Estonian Integration and Migration Foundation and the Estonian Ministry of Education and Research have all funded and helped Estonian programs and teachers in Abkhazia. Estonians in Abkhazia have been featured in many Soviet and Estonian movies, documentaries and newsreels. In 2013 Tangerines (film) was released, story of an Estonian during the 1992–1993 War in Abkhazia.

The legal status of Abkhazian Estonians is complex, descendants of Estonians in Abkhazia who were given Estonian passports have birthright-citizenship, but confirming this and the legality of the papers given out by the Executive Committee of the Soviet Estonia (Estonian: Eestimaa Nõukogude Täitevkomitee) and the Tbilisi Estonian People's Council (Estonian: Tiflisi Eesti Rahva Nõukogu) is questionable. Many have opted for Russian citizenship instead since frequent crossing of the Abkhaz-Russian border for economic reasons is very common.

Today three Estonian societies operate in Abkhazia, they are:

- Sukhumi Estonian Cultural Society Linda (Estonian: Suhhumi Eesti Kultuuriselts Linda)
- Estonian Kalevipoeg Society in Abkhazia (Estonian: Eesti Selts "Kalevipoeg" Abhaasias)
- Kalevipoeg - Gagra District Estonian Society (Estonian: Kalevipoeg - Gagra rajooni Eesti Selts)

== List of settlements ==
- Alam-Linda
- Estonia, renamed "Dopukyt" (Abkhaz: Допукыт)
- Kotkapesa
- Salme küla, renamed "Psou" (Abkhaz: Ҧсоу)
- Sulevi küla
- Ülem-Linda

== See also ==
- Tangerines (film)
- Linnart Mäll
