= Gagra railway station =

Railway station in Abkhazia, Georgia

Coordinates: 43.2626°N 40.2837°E

Gagra
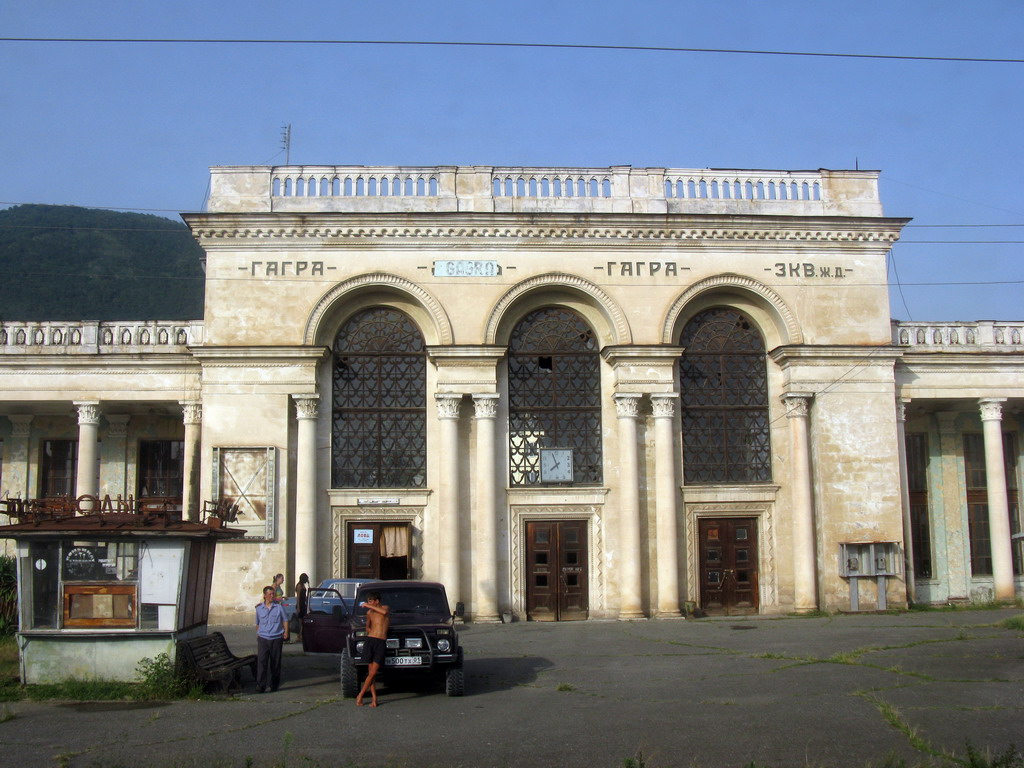
- View of the station from Privokzalnaya square (2008).

General information
- Location: Gagra, Abkhazia
- System: Abkhazian Railway terminal
- Owner: Russian Railways (Abkhazian Railways)
- Platforms: 2 (1 island platform)
- Tracks: 3

Construction
- Parking: yes

Other information
- Station code: 574304
- Fare zone: 0

History
- Opened: 1943
- Former names: Gagra-Tovarnaya (1943–1959)

Services
Preceding station	Abkhazian railway (de jure Georgian Railway)	Following station
Gantiadi towards Vesyoloye	Sukhumi–Psou	Bzipi towards Sukhumi
Former services
Preceding station	Abkhazian railway (de jure Georgian Railway)	Following station
Ashchyda towards Vesyoloye	Sukhumi–Psou	Bagnasheni towards Sukhumi
Route map
Location

Gagra (Russian: Гагра) is a railway station in Gagra, Abkhazia. Belongs to Abkhazian Railways.

== Main information ==
Gagra station is one of 3 railway stations of Gagra, the other 2 are Abaata and Gagrypsh.

== History ==
The station was opened in 1943 and was called Gagra-Tovarnaya. In 1959 it was renamed in Gagra Railway station.

== Trains ==
- Moscow–Sukhumi
- Saint Petersburg–Sukhumi
- Belgorod–Sukhumi
- Adler–Gagra
