= Leselidze (platform) =

Rail platform

Coordinates: 43.3895°N 40.0357°E

Leselidze Georgian: ლესელიძე, Abkhaz: Гьачрыҧшь

General information
- Line: Abkhazian railway
- Platforms: 1
- Tracks: 1

Services
Preceding station	Abkhazian railway (de jure Georgian Railway)	Following station
Psou towards Vesyoloye	Sukhumi–Psou	Gantiadi towards Sukhumi
Route map
Location

Leselidze (Gyachrypsh) is a halt on the Psou - Enguri railway line in Abkhazia. In some schedules it is listed as a halt at km 2,000.

According to 2003 data, it was listed in railway atlases as Leselidze platform of Georgian railways Samtredia department, station code 57441, code express 3 2800810. The actual platform relates to the Abkhaz railway stop at Leselidze.

A small station building was built in the 1950s, but it was abandoned as of 2003.

From June 26, 2010, two pairs of commuter trains between Adler and Gagra stop here during the day.

The station layout consists of one high-side platform used for traffic in both directions.

== See also ==
- Georgian Railway
