= Tarba =

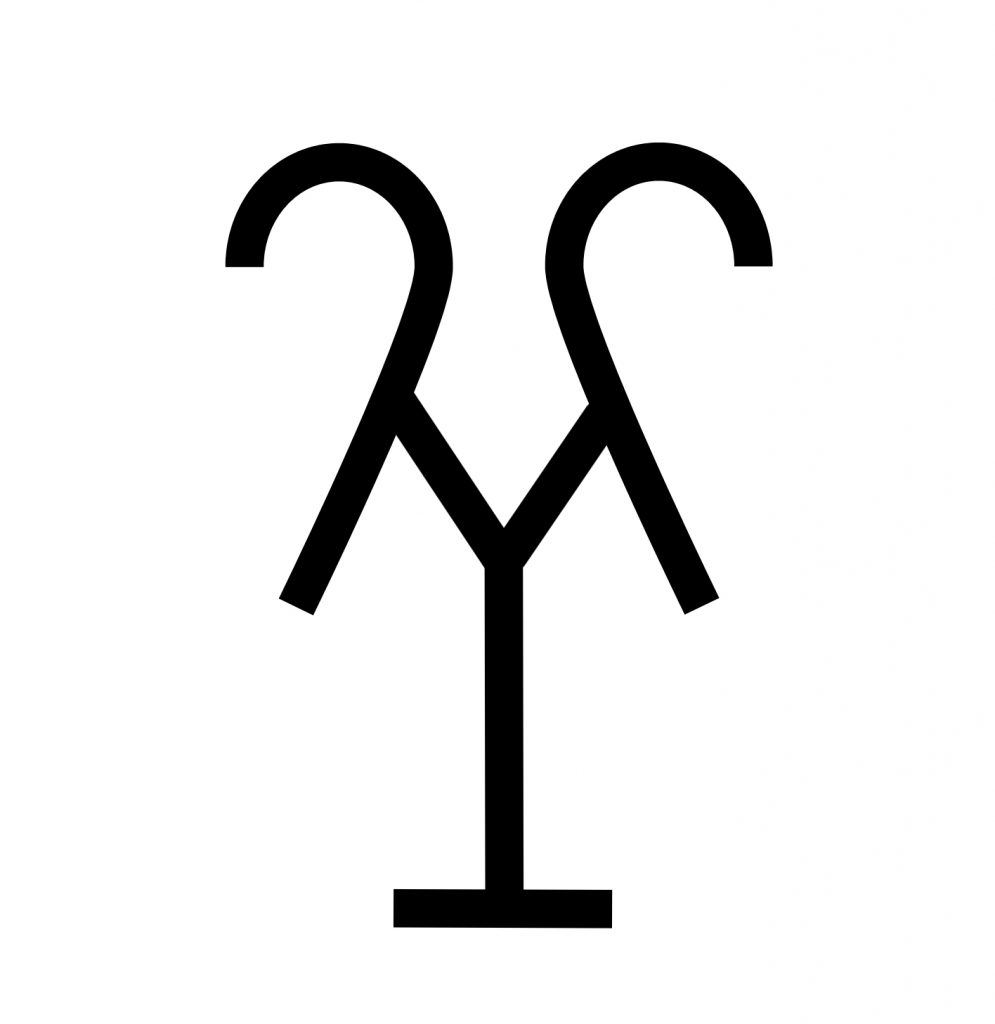
Tarba clan tamga

Tarba (абх. Аҭар, Аҭарба; множ. Ҭараа) is an abkhazian clan, one of the largest in the Republic of Abkhazia. It is widespread throughout Abkhazia and among the abkhaz diaspora in Turkey.

The Tarba clan spread due to a series of conflicts between the Abkhaz and Megrelian principalities in the 16th and 17th centuries. Some members of the clan moved from the north-west of Abkhazia (Sadzen and Akhchipsou) to the war against the Megrelian principality. After the war, they settled in the eastern regions of Abkhazia (Abzhui and Samurzakan), forming new branches of the clan.

During the period of muhajirism, some representatives of the clan moved to Turkey. They settled in the area between the cities of Duzce and Sakarya
