= Caucasian Pass Railway =

Cancelled project in Russia and Georgia

The Caucasian Pass Railway (Кавказская перевальная железная дорога) is an abandoned project for a railroad between Vladikavkaz and Tbilisi, crossing the Caucasus Mountains.

Construction commenced in the 1980s but was abandoned shortly after.

== Situation ==
The Caucasus mountains form a natural border between Russia in the North and today´s Georgia and Azerbaijan in the South. Despite this natural border, the Russian Empire conquered the territories South of the mountains in the early 19th century. The area remained under Russian and later Soviet control for the following decades, aside from brief war-related periods.

Thus, establishing transport connections between the Southern Caucasus and Russia became a high priority for both the Russian Empire and the Soviet Union.

=== Roads ===
Very few roads crossing the Caucasus mountain range were constructed. They include the Georgian Military Road and Ossetian Military Road.

=== North-South railway routes ===
The first mainline railway in Georgia and Azerbaijan was the Transcaucasus Railway. Till present day, it links the Black Sea at Poti with the Caspian Sea at Baku. It was constructed between 1865 and 1883 and was backed by the Russian Empire which controlled the area back then. The line had a major strategic background for the Russian Empire but initially wasn´t linked to other Russian railroads. However, Russian construction parameters and gauge were used.

Later, two links were built to connect the railway in the Southern Caucasus Region with mainland Russia. They are both running close to the respective coastlines East and West of the Caucausus, thereby bypassing high mountain ranges.

The first route to be built linking the railway South of the Caucasus with mainline Russia was opened in 1900. It connected the Transcaucasus Railway with the Russian Railway by linking Baku and Derbent. It is running through a relatively flat terrain along the Caspian Sea. However, going through Baku poses a major detour when traveling between Georgia and Russia.

The railway distance between Russia and Georgia was drastically shortened with the construction of the Abkhazian railway, which is running through a far more difficult terrain along the Black Sea. It linked the North Caucasus Railway in Russia with the Transcaucasus Railway. Construction started relatively late and commenced from the South. In 1930, Gali was connected to the Georgian railway system, marking the first-ever railway connection to Abchazia. Sukhumi was reached in 1940 and the remaining section connecting to the Russian border and railway network was taken into operation by 1949. The entire line has a length of 220 kilometres. The route was partially abandoned in 1992 due to the war in Abchazia.

During the Russian Empire and Soviet era, different projects for a more direct North-South link with Tbilisi were studied. As the route would have to traverse the central and high portion of the Greater Caucasus range, such a project posed a major technological challenge.

== 1980s Soviet project ==
=== Project history ===
In 1984, the Soviet Union gave the go-ahead for a railroad between Vladikavkaz and Tbilisi. Preparation works commenced in 1985 and the construction itself was started in 1986-1987. Completion was expected for the year 2000.

However, in light of the dissolution of the Soviet Union, construction was already stopped in 1988 at a very early stage. The subsequent breakup of the Soviet Union with Georgia declaring independence in 1991 and emerging tension in the region buried all hopes for the project.

=== Project details ===
The railroad would have had a length of 178 kilometers and would have been an engineering masterpiece. A total of 72 bridges and 38 tunnels were to be constructed. The longest tunnel would have had a length of 23 kilometers and had crossed the Arkhoti pass.
