= Leselidze =

Leselidze can refer to the following people and places, related to Georgia:

- Leselidze (platform), a halt on the Psou-Engur railway line in Abkhazia
- Leselidze (town), a town in Abkhazia, Georgia
- Soviet-era name of the Kote Abkhazi street in the historical part of Tbilisi
- Konstantin Leselidze, Soviet Georgian Colonel General and participant of World War II
- Viktor Leselidze, lieutenant colonel, commander Mortar Regiment, Hero of the Soviet Union
