= Sirius railway station =

Railway station in Krasnodar Krai, Russia

Sirius Сириус
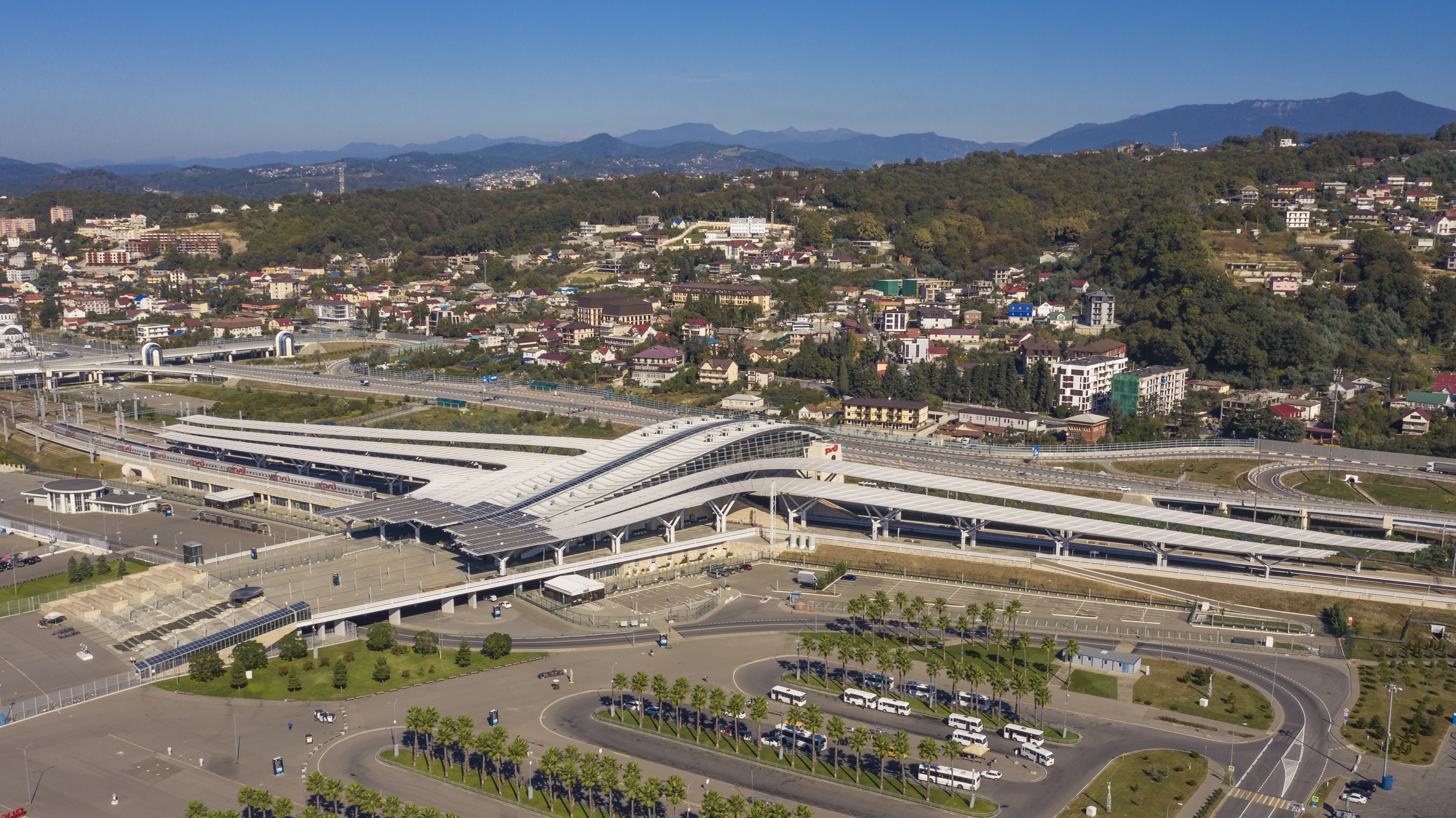
- The station

General information
- Location: Sirius federal territory Krasnodar Krai; Russia
- Coordinates: 43°24′43.24″N 39°58′27.62″E
- Owner: Russian Railways
- Operator: North Caucasus Railway
- Line: Krasnodar—Sukhumi
- Platforms: 2
- Tracks: 2

Construction
- Structure type: At-grade
- Parking: Yes
- Cycle facilities: Yes

History
- Opened: 2013
- Former names: Olympic Park, Imeretinsky Kurort

Services
| Preceding station | Russian Railways | Following station |
|---|---|---|
| Olympic Village towards Krivenkovskaya | Krivenkovskaya–Vesioloye | Vesyoloye Terminus |
Location

Sirius railway station (Russian: Сириус) is a railway station of the North Caucasus Railway, a subsidiary of Russian Railways, located in Sirius federal territory, Russia.

== History ==
The station was built for the 2014 Winter Olympics as Olympic Park and was the main transport hub of Olympic Park, the coastal cluster. During the Olympics, 26 pairs of trains departed daily from the station to Krasnaya Polyana where the remainder of the Olympic events occurred.

On 15 March 2016, the station was renamed Imeretinsky Kurort and in 2026 Sirius.

== Trains ==
- Tuapse — Olympic Park
- Sochi — Olympic Park
- Roza Khutor — Olympic Park

== Gallery ==
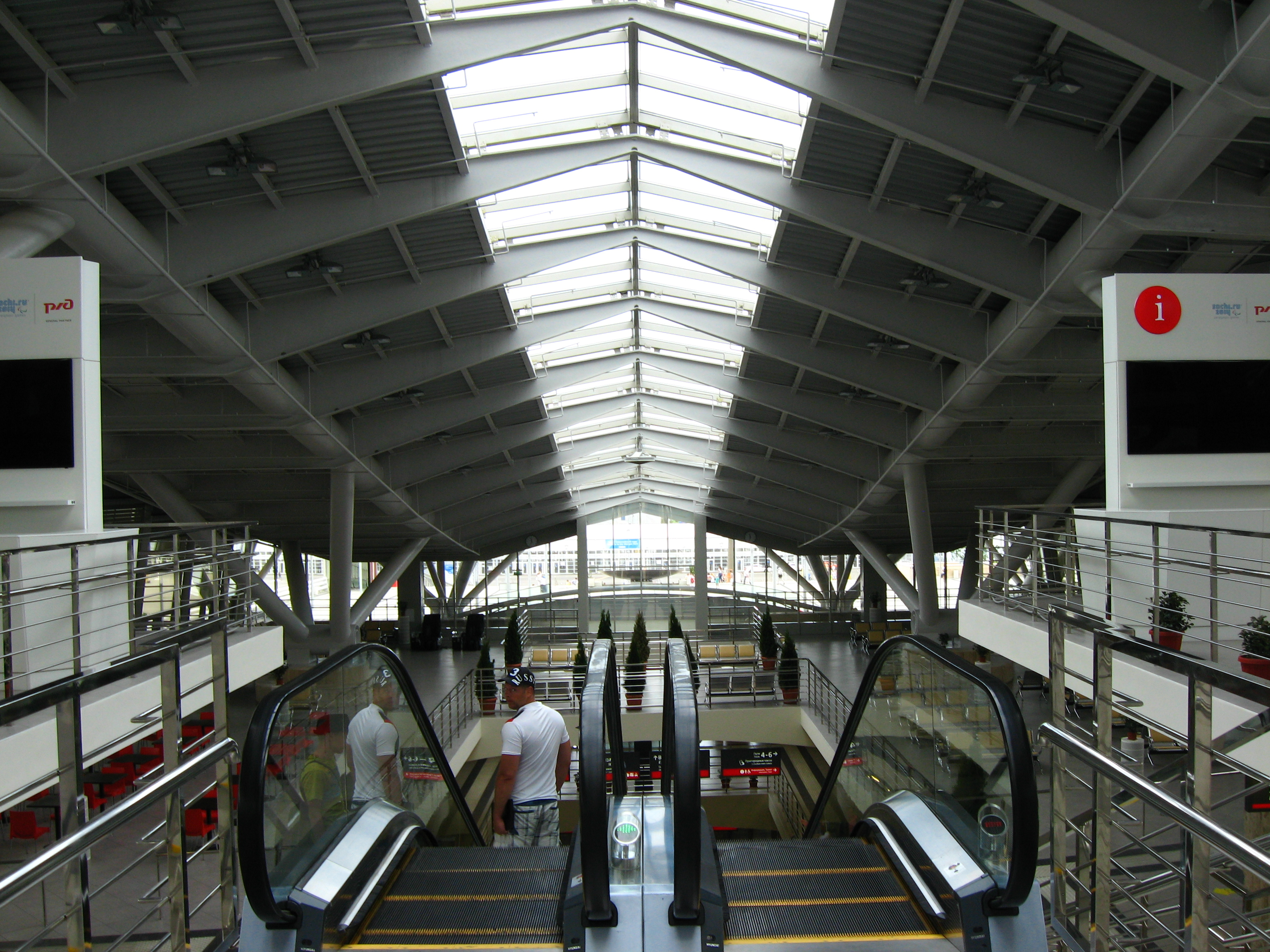
The station building

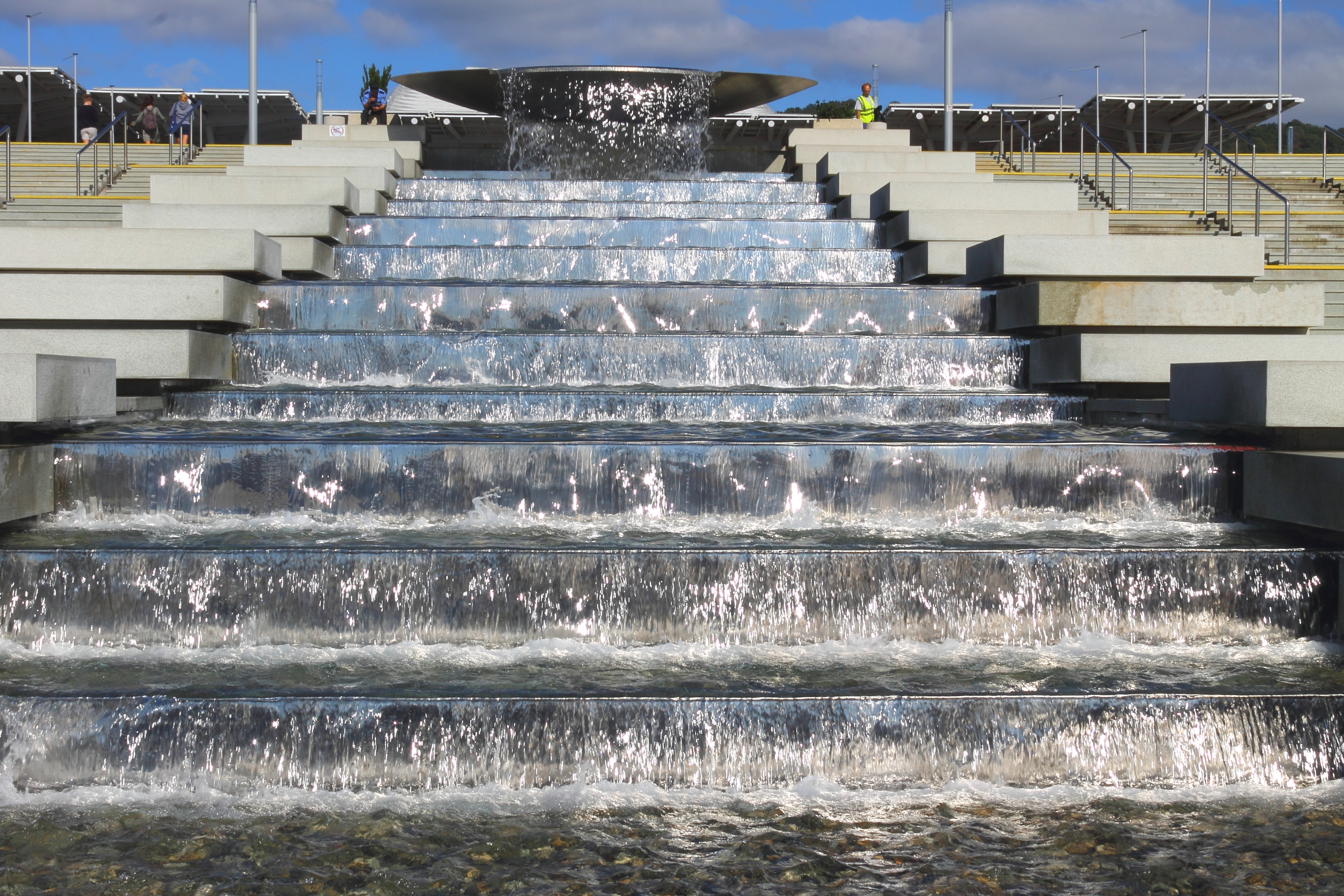
Fountain
