= Vesyoloye, Krasnodar Krai =

Vesyoloye Весёлое
- Selo
- Interactive map of Vesyoloye
- Location of Vesyoloye Vesyoloye (Krasnodar Krai)
- Coordinates: 43°23′58″N 39°59′17″E
- Country: Russia
- Federal subject: Krasnodar Krai
- Administrative district: Adlersky City District
- Rural okrugSelsoviet: Nizhneshilovsky Rural Okrug
- Elevation: 40 m (130 ft)

Population
  - Estimate (2002): 4,100 )

Administrative status
  - Subordinated to: City of Sochi

Municipal status
  - Urban okrug: Sochi Urban Okrug
- Time zone: UTC+3 (MSK)
- Postal code: 354375
- OKTMO ID: 03726000226

Vesyoloye (Russian: Весёлое, IPA: [vʲɪˈsʲɵləɪ]) is a rural locality (a selo) in Nizhneshilovsky Rural Okrug under the administrative jurisdiction of Adlersky City District of the City of Sochi. Population: 4,100 (2002 est.).

== Etymology ==
The locality's name in Russian means "cheerful" and was given due to its beautiful and "cheerful-looking" environs.

== Geography ==
The Psou River divides Vesyoloye with Abkhazia and traffic between Russian and Abkhazia is regulated by the Psou border control center. Vesyoloye stands on the M27 Highway which terminates at the Russian-Abkhazian border.

== Science and culture ==
Vesyoloye is notable for its Research Institute of Medical Primatology, established in 1927.

In 2008, an ethnographic museum opened in Vesyoloye, containing exhibits of archaic materials which various ethnic groups (Russians, Armenians, Adyghe, Georgians) in the region used.

== Railway station ==
Vesyoloye is also home to a railway station of the North Caucasian Railway. Long-distance trains heading to Abkhazia, a disputed territory recognized as independent by Russia, make a stop at the station, where border control is carried out. Since the station is a border station, the territory of the station is surrounded by a concrete fence.

Preceding station	Russian Railways	Following station
Imeretinsky Kurort towards Krivenkovskaya	Krivenkovskaya–Vesioloye	through to Abkhazian railway
Preceding station	Abkhazian railway (de jure Georgian Railway)	Following station
through to Russian Railways	Sukhumi–Psou	Psou towards Sukhumi
