= Sulevi =

Estonian village in Abkhazia, Georgia

Sulevi სულევი (in Georgian)
- Village
- Location within Abkhazia Location within Georgia
- Country: Georgia
- Partially recognized independent country: Abkhazia
- District: Gagra

Population (1989)
  - Total: 880
- Time zone: UTC+3 (MSK)
  - Summer (DST): UTC+4

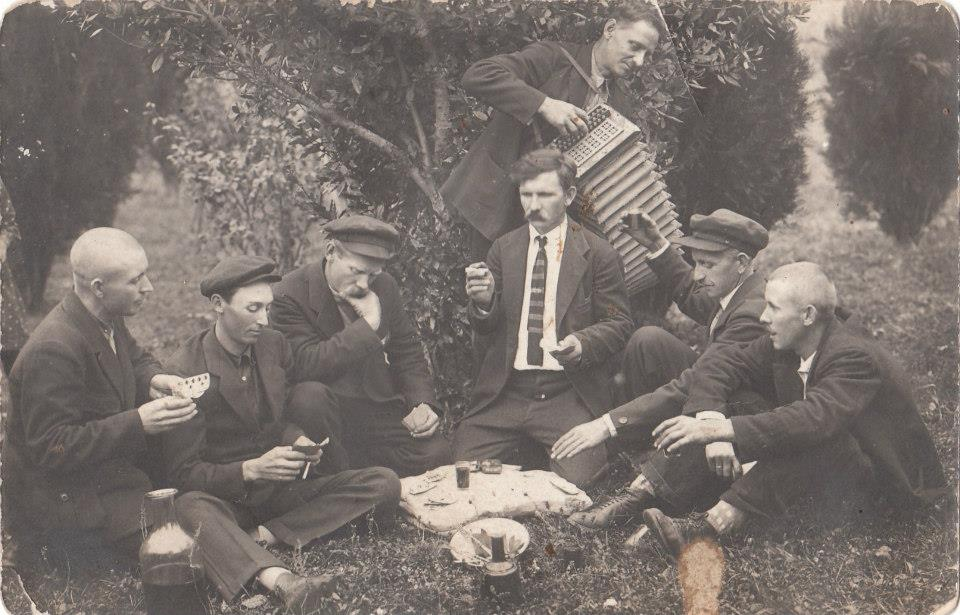
Dwellers during small party (about 1920)

Sulevi (Georgian: სულევი; Abkhaz: Пшоухәа) is a village in Abkhazia, Georgia.

The village was established by Estonians in 19th century. As of 2011, 127 Estonians live there (together with Salme village).
