= Linda, Georgia =

Estonian village in Abkhazia, Georgia

Linda Georgian: ლინდა Abkhaz: Линда Russian: Линда
- Village
- Location within Abkhazia Location within Georgia
- Country: Georgia
- Partially recognized independent country: Abkhazia
- District: Sukhumi

Population (2002)
  - Total: 0
- Time zone: UTC+3 (MSK)
  - Summer (DST): UTC+4

Linda (Georgian: ლინდა; Abkhaz: Линда) or Ülem-Linda is a village in Abkhazia, Georgia.

The village was established by Estonians in 1884. It had a school and a prayer house. Due to the War in Abkhazia the village was hit particularly hard due to its proximity to Sukhumi. Many Estonians fled and as of 2002, the village has been abandoned.

== See also ==
- Alam-Linda
