= Transcaucasus Railway =

First railway in the South Caucasus (1871–1991)

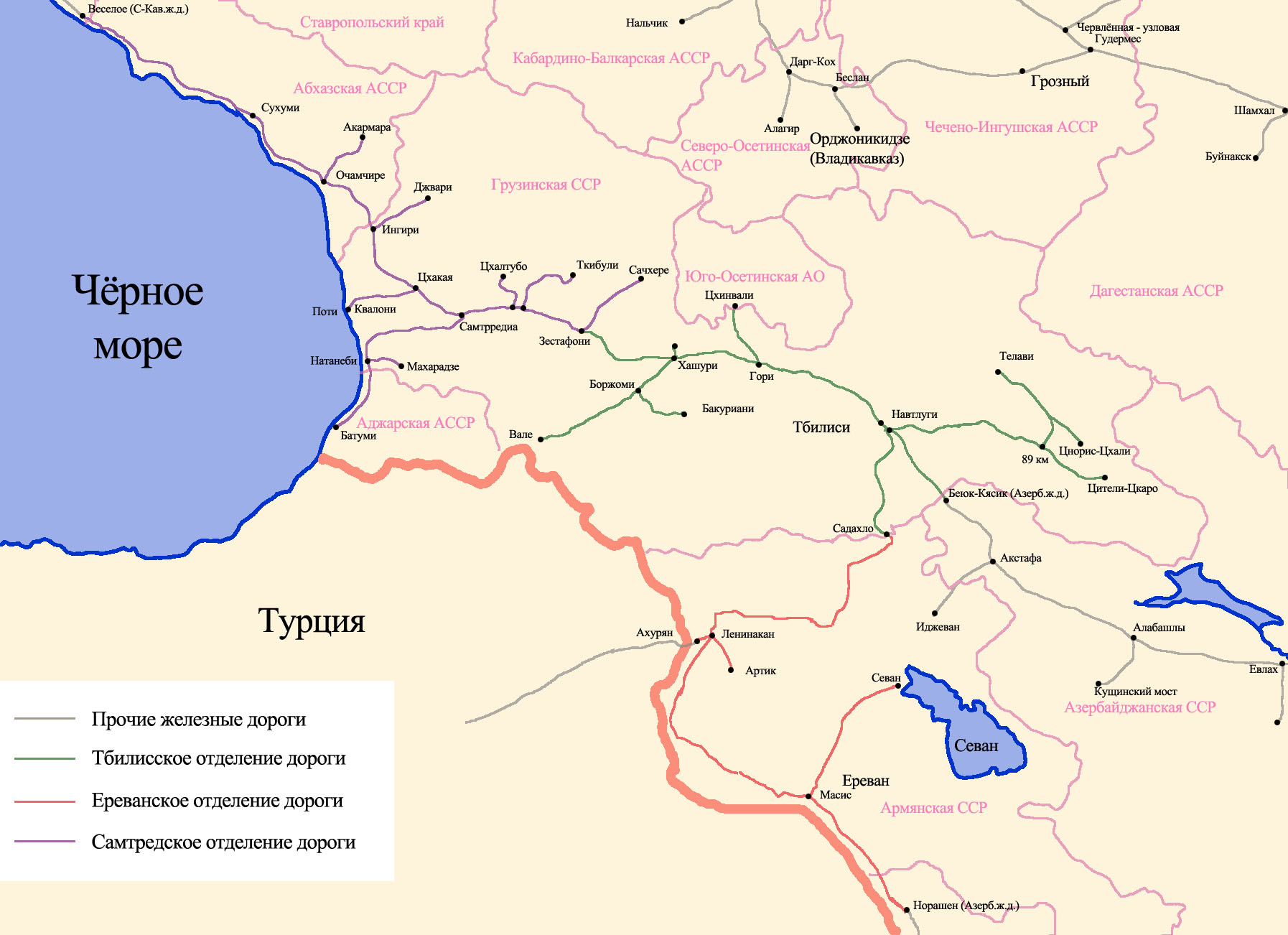
- The railway in 1967—1991

Overview
- Headquarters: Tbilisi
- Reporting mark: ZZhD
- Locale: Russian Empire; USSR (Russia, Georgia, Armenia, Azerbaijan); Turkey
- Dates of operation: 1871–1991
- Successor: TCDD, RZhD, IRIR, ADDY, GR (AKR), HYU

Technical
- Track gauge: 1,520 mm (4 ft 11 27/32 in)

The Transcaucasus Railway (Russian: Закавка́зская желе́зная доро́га) was the first railway in the South Caucasus.

It was funded by the Russian Empire as a strategic railway connecting the Black Sea to the Caspian Sea. The railway would allow the Russian army to have better control of the Caucasus. Also with the Trans-Caspian railway, Russia could transport troops from Central Asia much faster. The railway operated as a private company between 1865–1922 and a subsidiary railway of the Soviet Railways from 1922–1991.

== History ==
=== Russian Empire (1865-1917) ===
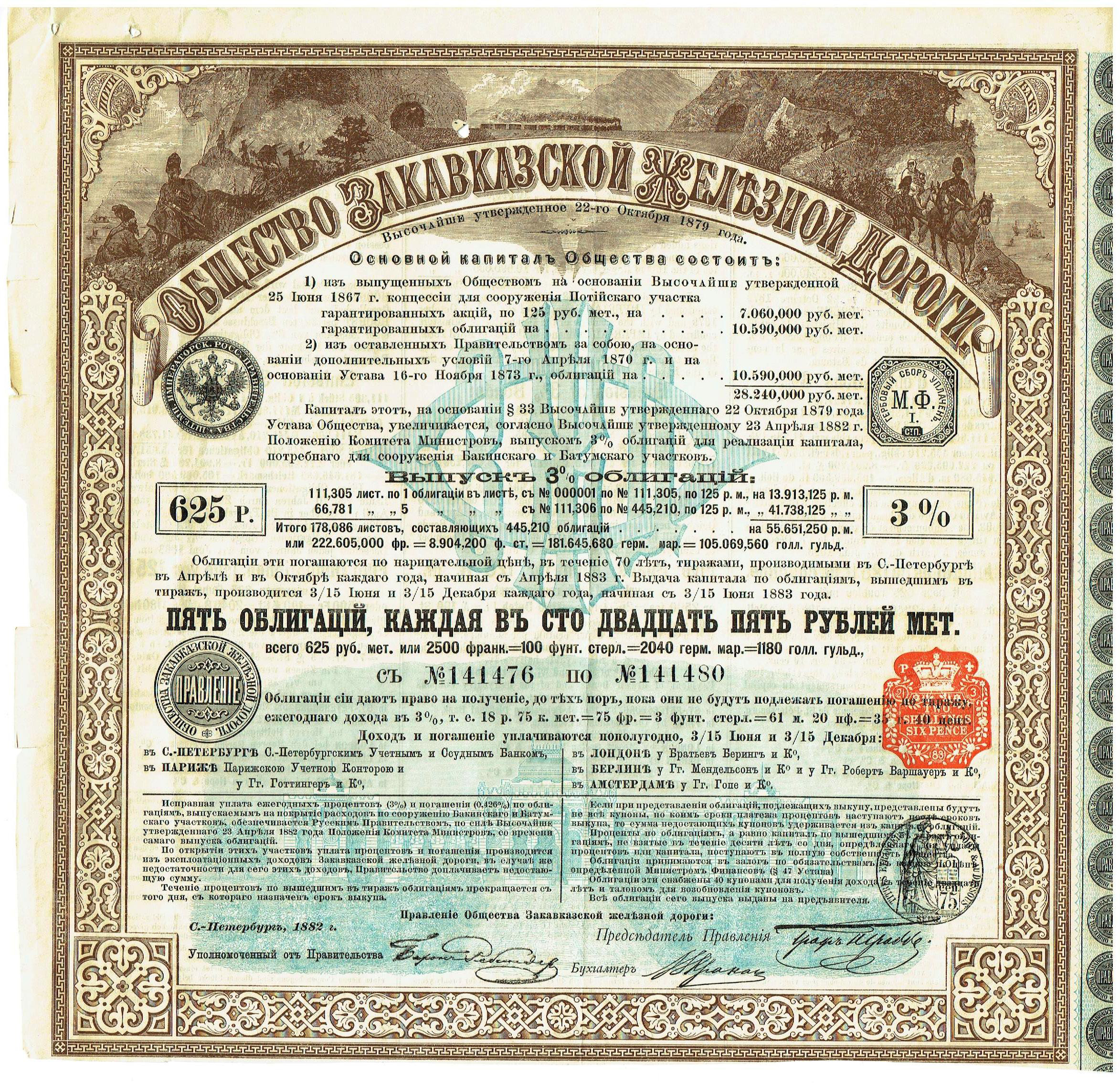
5 bonds of the Transcaucasian Railway-Company, issued 23. April 1882

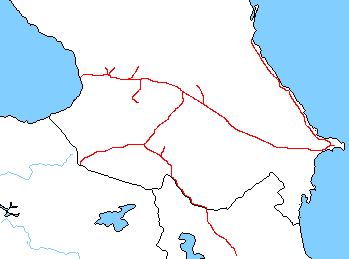
The railway in 1916

The railway started in 1865 at the port town of Poti on the Black Sea. The railway reached Zestaponi in 1871 and T'bilisi in 1872. The contractor for this part of the line was Messrs G.B. Crawley and Co.; the resident engineer was Edward Preston who had previously been at work in North Wales. This may account for the interest shown by this railway in Welsh mountain railways and narrow-gauge steam locomotives running on the north Wales Festiniog Railway. A branch line was built to Kutaisi, branching from Brotseula, in 1877.

In 1883, the railway was completed to Baku. Once the railway was completed to Baku, freight trains carrying oil went from Baku to Poti to be shipped to other cities in Russia via the Black Sea. During the Russian-Ottoman war from 1877–1878, the Russian Empire gained territory into Anatolia from the Ottoman Empire after defeating them during the Battle of Kars. This new territory included the fortress city of Kars. In 1887, a branch line was built to Tkibuli. In 1894, a branch line, splitting of at Khashuri, was built to Borjomi. Kars was a strategic city for the Russians in Anatolia, so in 1899 the railway built a branch line from T'blisi to Kars.

The Transcaucasus Railway was connected to the rest of the Russian system in 1900, when the line from Baku to Makhachkala was completed. A railway connection through the Caucasus mountain range to connect to the Russian system was considered as early as the 1890s, but the implementation of the Caucasian Pass Railway only started in the 1980s and was abandoned after a few years.

In 1902, the narrow gauge Borjomi to Bakuriani Railway was built to serve the skiing community in the region. In 1913, the railway was extended from Kars to Sarıkamış; the border of the Russian Empire and the Ottoman Empire at the time. When World War I broke out in 1914, the Russian Empire sided with the Allied powers while the Ottoman Empire sided with the Central Powers making the two empires enemies.

After the Erzerum Offensive, Russia gained control city of Erzurum. To support campaigns further into Ottoman territory, a 750 mm (2 ft 5 1/2 in) gauge railway was built from Sarıkamış to Erzurum in 1916 and extended to Yeniköy later the same year. Russia had to stop fighting in the war because of the Russian revolution of 1917, that led to the dissolution of the Russian Empire.

=== Russian Civil War (1918-1922) ===
With the dissolution of the Russian Empire, a 147 km part of the Julfa-Tabriz line was acquired by the Persian Railways. The Ottoman Empire lost, along with the Central Powers, giving northeastern Anatolia to Armenia. In 1919, the Turkish War of Independence broke out and northeastern Anatolia was taken back by the Turks, this time as the Republic of Turkey. The Treaty of Gümrü was signed on December 2, 1920 setting the present day borders of Turkey. The Transcaucasus Railway continued to operate the 404 km part of its system in Turkey. In 1921 the Erzurum-Yeniköy section of the line was abandoned.

=== Soviet Union (1922-1991) ===
The Soviet Union was formed in 1922, and the Transcaucasus Railway was absorbed by the Soviet Railways but continued to operate as a subsidiary railway. In 1924 the railway started building a line from Baku, south to Alyat, Shirvan and to the port city of Neftchala. In 1927, the Akyaka-Erzurum (in Turkey) section of its system was acquired by the Turkish State Railways. The railway built a branch line from Gyumri to Maralik in 1925. the railway built a line north to connect with the Soviet Railways at Adler branching off at Senaki, the line was completed to Gali in 1930, Sukhumi in 1938 and Adler in 1949. A branch line to Tkvarcheli was built in 1940. A line from Kutaisi to Tskaltubo was built in 1935 along with a branch to Tskhinvali in 1940. In 1941 the railway built two lines: one from Shirvan to Julfa and one from Salyan to Astara on the Azerbaijan-Iran border, thus connecting with the Iranian system. A line was built to the port city of Batumi was later built in the 1960s.

=== Dissolution of the Railway (1991) ===
After the dissolution of the Soviet Union the railway was divided among the new countries that were formed. Jalama-Makhachkala part of the Baku-Makhachkala line was acquired by the Russian Railways. The tracks in Georgia were acquired by the Georgian Railways LLC, although the tracks in Abkhazia were taken over by the Abkhazian railway (this company was later absorbed by the Georgian railways). The tracks in Azerbaijan and Nakhchivan were taken over by the Azerbaijan State Railway and the tracks in Armenia were taken over by the Armenian Railway.

The railway line in Abkhazia was acquired by Abkhazian Railway and in 2009 — Russian Railways.

The railway Tbilisi-Baku (connecting Georgia and Azerbaijan) was renovated in 2008–2014, along with a new railway built between Turkey and Tbilisi, Georgia, as part of the Kars–Tbilisi–Baku railway. The railway Tbilisi-Armenia-Turkey is not a part of this project and remains closed.

== See also ==
- Rail transport in Europe
