= Estonia, Georgia =

Estonian village in Abkhazia

Estonia ესტონკა (Georgian) Допукыт (Abkhaz) Estonia (Estonian)
- Village
- Location within Abkhazia Location within Georgia
- Coordinates: 42°53′N 41°12′E
- Country: Georgia
- Partially recognized independent country: Abkhazia (Note: The political status of Abkhazia is disputed. Having unilaterally declared independence from Georgia in 1992, Abkhazia is formally recognised as an independent state by 4 UN member states (three other states previously recognised it but then withdrew their recognition), while the remainder of the international community recognizes it as de jure Georgian territory. Georgia continues to claim the area as its own territory, designating it as Russian-occupied territory.)
- District: Sukhumi

Population
  - Estimate (1989): 1,279
- Time zone: UTC+3 (MSK)

Estonia (Georgian: ესტონკა, romanized: est'onk'a; Abkhaz: Допукыт) or sometimes Estonka, is a village in Abkhazia, Georgia by the river Kodori.

The village was founded in 1881 and had a school and prayerhouse and a civic center. Greeks of the village were deported to Kazakhstan in the late 1940s. By 2008 only 10 Estonian families lived there and the village has been renamed to 'Dopuket' by the Abkhazians.
