= Ivanishvili =

Ivanishvili (Georgian: ივანიშვილი) is a Georgian surname that may refer to the following notable people:

- Bera Ivanishvili (born 1994), Georgian singer, songwriter, international pop star, hip hop and R&B artist known with his mononym Bera. Son of Bidzina Ivanishvili
- Bidzina Ivanishvili (born 1956), Georgian billionaire and politician
- Giorgi Ivanishvili (born 1989), Georgian football player
