= Sukhumi railway station =

Railway station in Sukhumi, Georgia

Coordinates: 43.0072°N 40.9959°E

Sukhumi Аҟәа სოხუმის რ/ს Станция Сухум
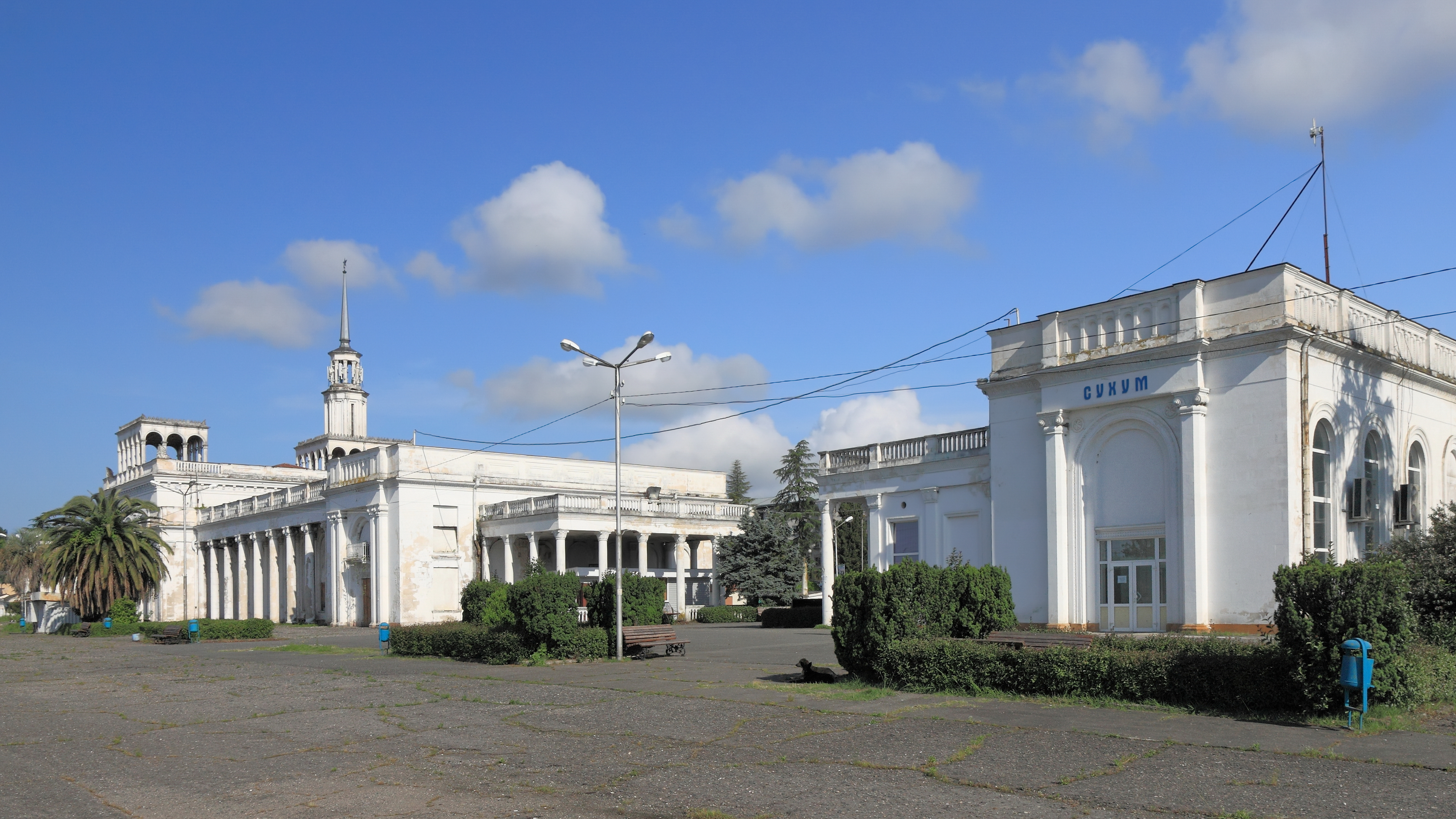
- View of the station from Privokzalnaya square.

General information
- Location: Sukhumi; Abkhazia, Georgia
- System: Abkhazian Railway terminal
- Owner: Russian Railways (Abkhazian Railway)
- Platforms: 2 (1 island platforms)
- Tracks: 6

Construction
- Parking: yes

Other information
- Station code: 573909
- Fare zone: 0

History
- Opened: 1940

Services
| Preceding station | Abkhazian railway (de jure Georgian Railway) | Following station |
|---|---|---|
| New Athos towards Vesyoloye | Sukhumi–Psou | Terminus |
Former services
| Preceding station | Abkhazian railway (de jure Georgian Railway) | Following station |
|---|---|---|
| Ashadara towards Vesyoloye | Sukhumi–Psou | through to inactive lines |
| Terminus | Inactive line | Guma towards Akarmara or Ingiri (Georgia) |
Location

Sukhumi (Abkhaz: Аҟәа, Georgian: სოხუმის რკინიგზის სადგური, Russian: Станция Сухум) is a railway station in the capital of Abkhazia — Sukhumi.

== History ==
The railway came to Abkhazia in the early 1930s. In 1940, Abkhazian railway opened from Enguri to Sukhumi and then, in 1942, the Sukhumi — Adler line was opened.

In 1949, Abkhazian Railway became part of the Transcaucasian Railway. The current station building was built in the mid-1950s.

In the beginning of 1992 the following trains were passing Sukhumi:

- Moscow — Tbilisi
- Moscow — Tsqaltubo
- Moscow — Batumi
- Moscow — Sukhumi
- Moscow — Yerevan
- Rostov-on-Don — Yerevan
- Kyiv — Tbilisi
- St.Petersburg — Sukhumi
- Sochi — Yerevan

On 5 December 2002, on the bridge over the Psou river was the train Sukhumi — Sochi. In 2004, on the Abkhazian section of the railway (from Psou to Sukhumi) full-scale restoration work began, carried out by Russian construction companies. Train service was suspended during construction.

On 10 September 2004, Abkhazian railway the Sukhumi — Moscow train began operations.

== Trains ==
- Moscow — Sukhumi
- St.Petersburg — Sukhumi
- Belgorod — Sukhumi

== Photos ==
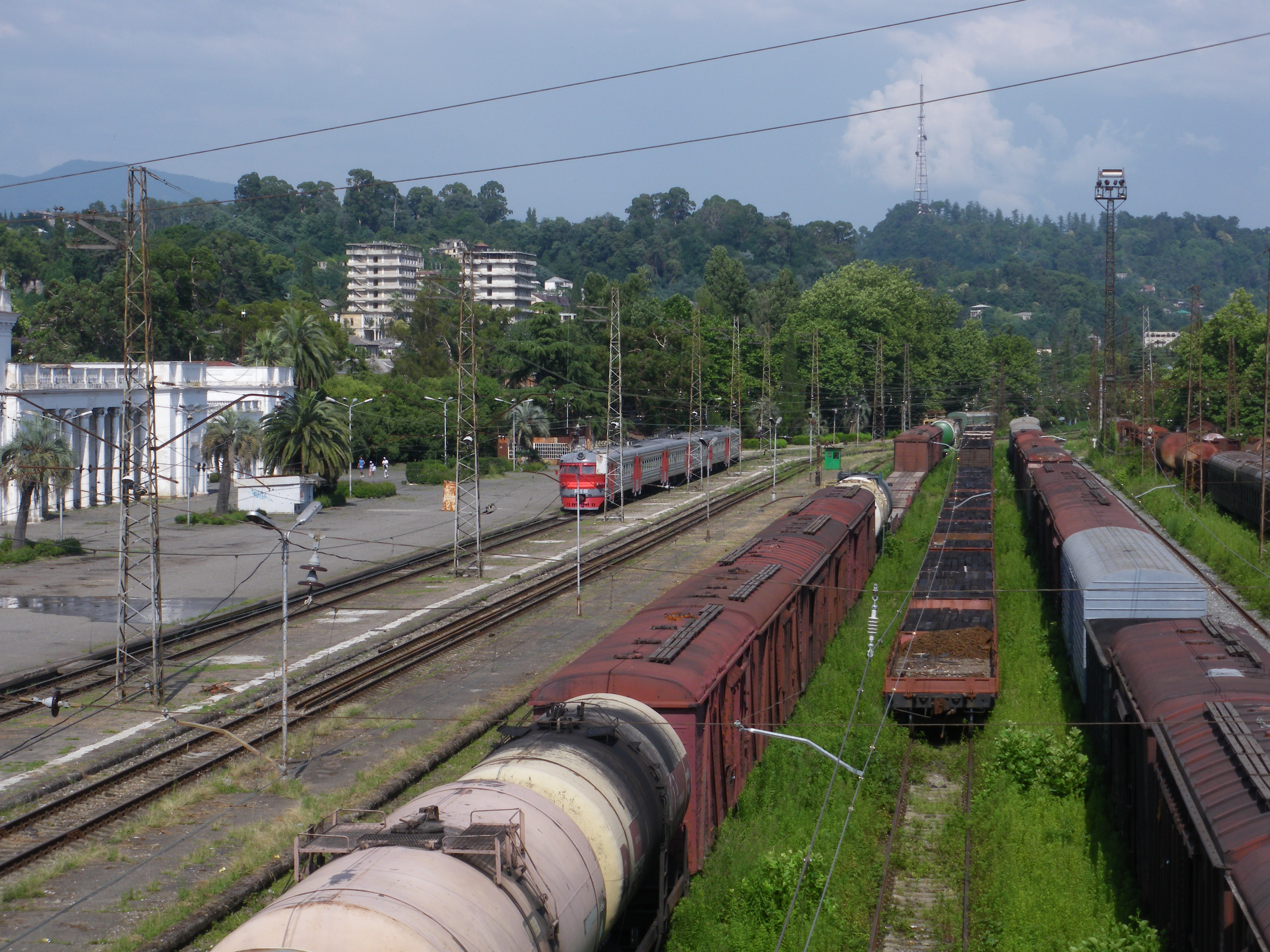
Tracks on the station

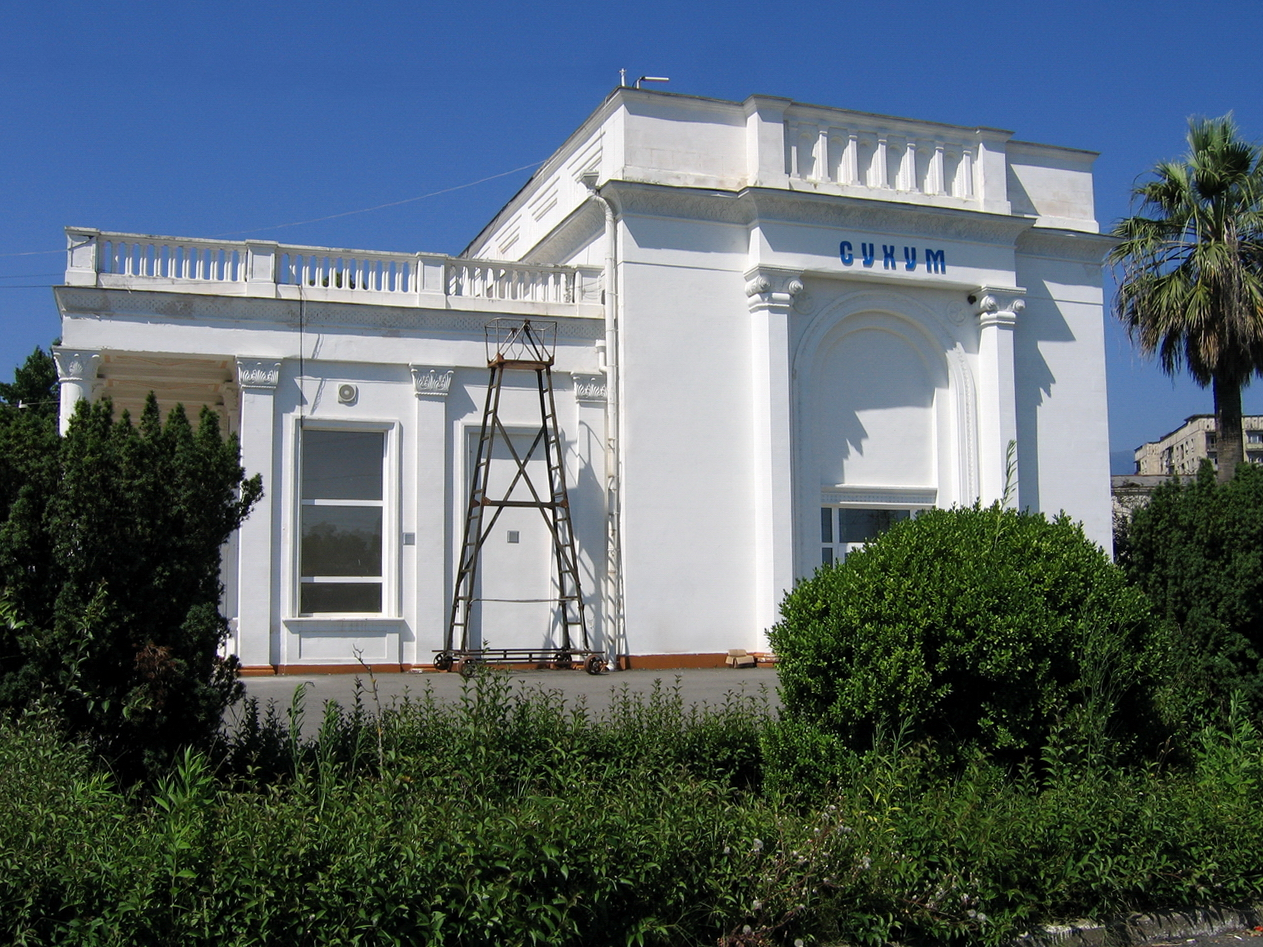
Station building

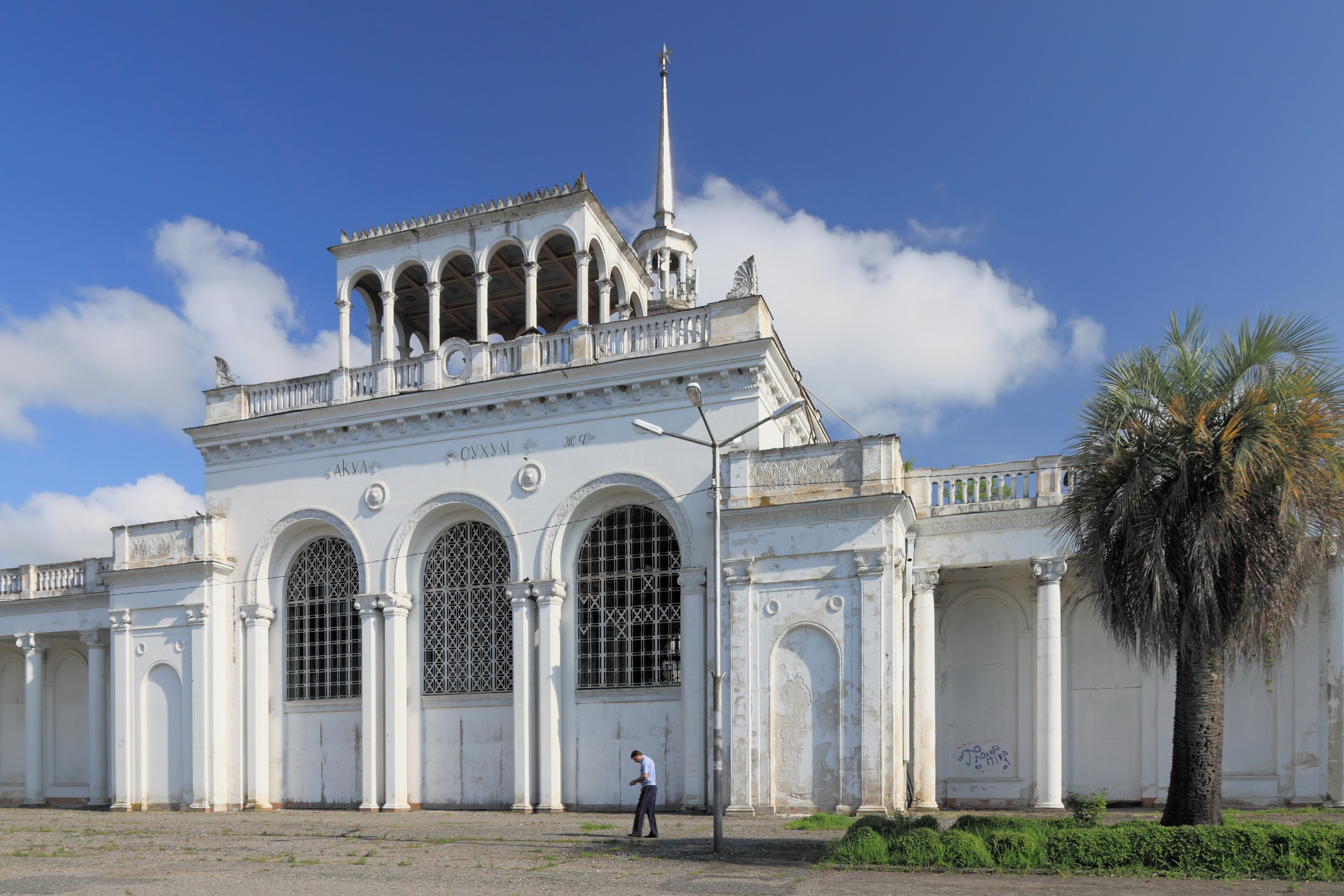
Station building

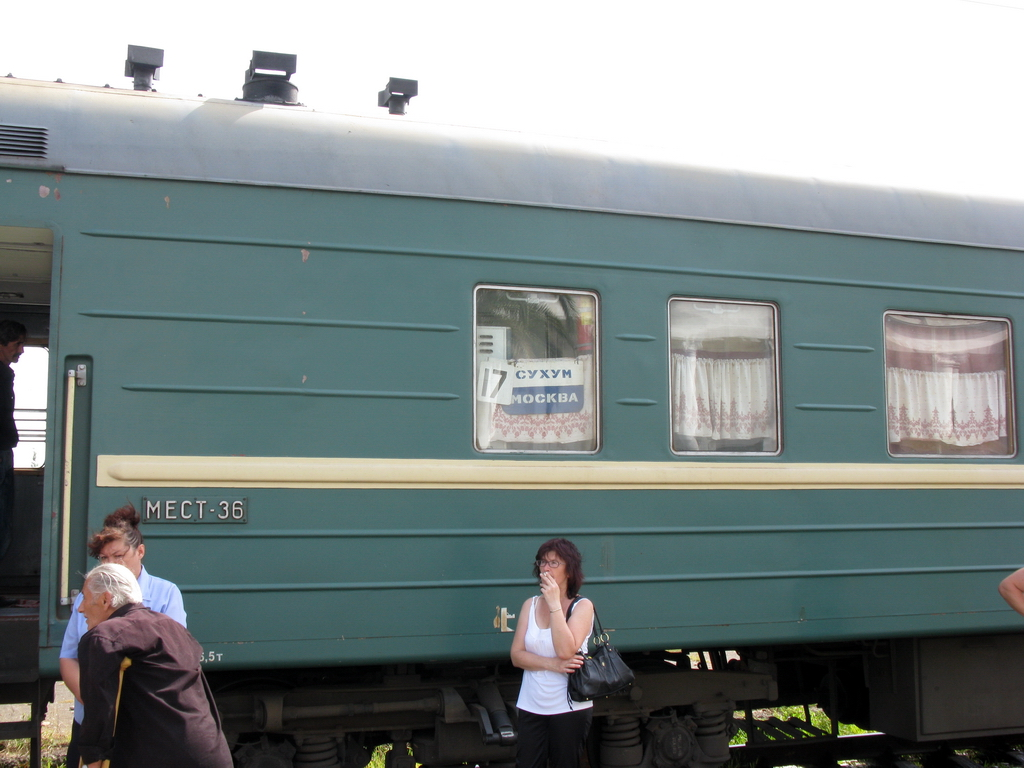
Moscow—Sukhumi train on platform 1

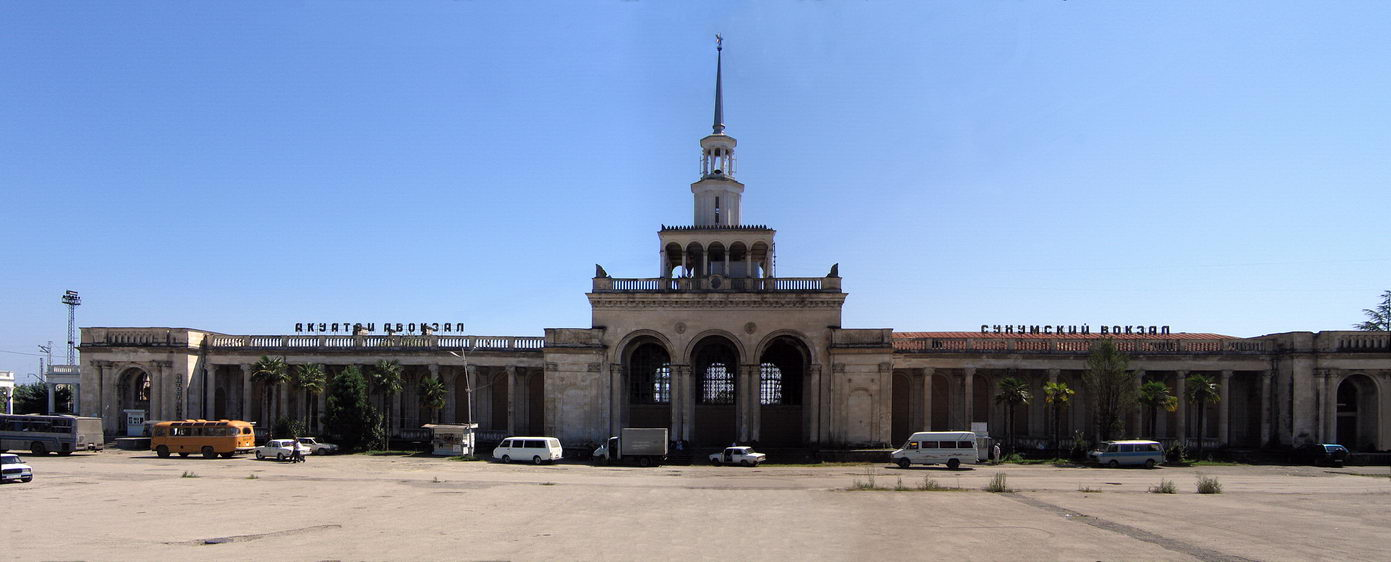
Station building
