= Mikelrypsh =

Mikelrypsh Georgian: მიქელრიფში
- Village (and municipality)
- Location in Abkhazia Mikelrypsh (Georgia)
- Coordinates: 43°30′21″N 40°04′23″E
- Country: Georgia
- Partially recognized independent country: Abkhazia
- District: Gagra

Government
  - Mayor: Zaven Galajyan (Note: "Администрация городов, сёл и посёлков Гагрского района". Gagra District Administration.)
  - Deputy Mayor: Vadim Simsim

Population (2011)
  - Total: 326
- Time zone: UTC+3 (MSK)

Mikelrypsh (Georgian: მიქელრიფში, Abkhaz: Мқьалрыҧь, Russian: Микелрипш or Мкялрыпш) is a village in the Gagra District of Abkhazia. (Note: The political status of Abkhazia is disputed. Having unilaterally declared independence from Georgia in 1992, Abkhazia is formally recognised as an independent state by 4 UN member states (three other states previously recognised it but then withdrew their recognition), while the remainder of the international community recognizes it as de jure Georgian territory. Georgia continues to claim the area as its own territory, designating it as Russian-occupied territory.)

== Demographics ==
At the time of the 2011 Census, Mikelrypsh had a population of 326. Of these, 94.5% were Armenians, 2.1% Russians, 1.5% Georgians, 0.9% Abkhaz, 0.6% Ukrainians and 0.3% Greeks.

== See also ==
- Gagra District
