= Akhchipsou =

The Ahchipsou were a Sadz (Abkhaz-Abazin) tribe, that lived on Caucasus Major, near the modern border of Krasnodar Krai and Abkhazia.
