= Alam-Linda =

Estonian village in Abkhazia, Georgia

Alam-Linda Georgian: ქვემო ლინდა Abkhaz: Аладахьтәи Линда Russian: Нижняя Линда
- Village
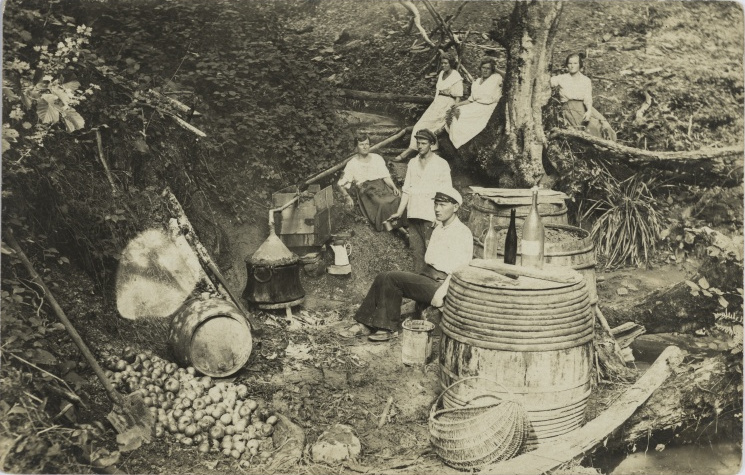
- Moonshine makers in Alam-Linda during the 1920s.

- Location within Abkhazia Location within Georgia
- Country: Georgia
- Partially recognized independent country: Abkhazia
- District: Sukhumi
- Time zone: UTC+3 (MSK)
  - Summer (DST): UTC+4

Alam-Linda (Georgian: ქვემო ლინდა; Abkhaz: Аладахьтәи Линда), meaning 'Lower-Linda' or Kummi küla is a village in Abkhazia, Georgia.

The village was established by Estonians in 19th century. It had its own school and prayer house, singing society "Koidula" and singing choir. As of 2011, probably no Estonians live there.
