= Lesser Abkhazia =

Lesser Abkhazia ჯიქეთი
- Historical region
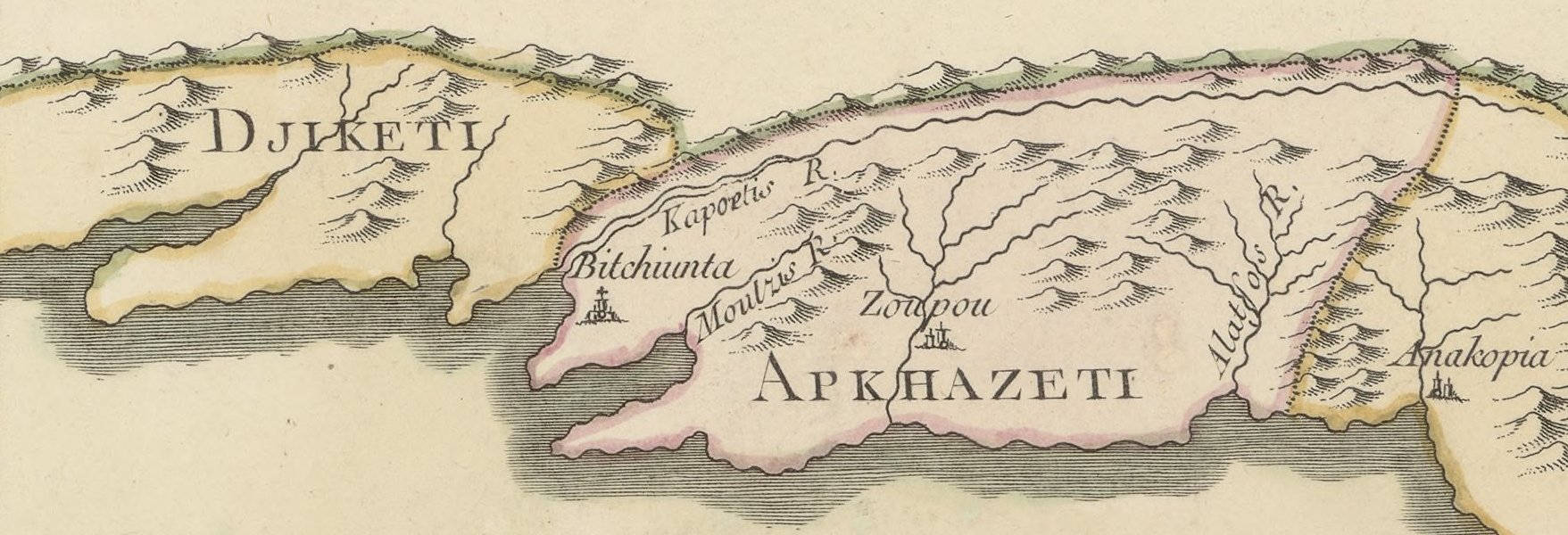
- Djiketi and Apkhazeti, 1766 map.

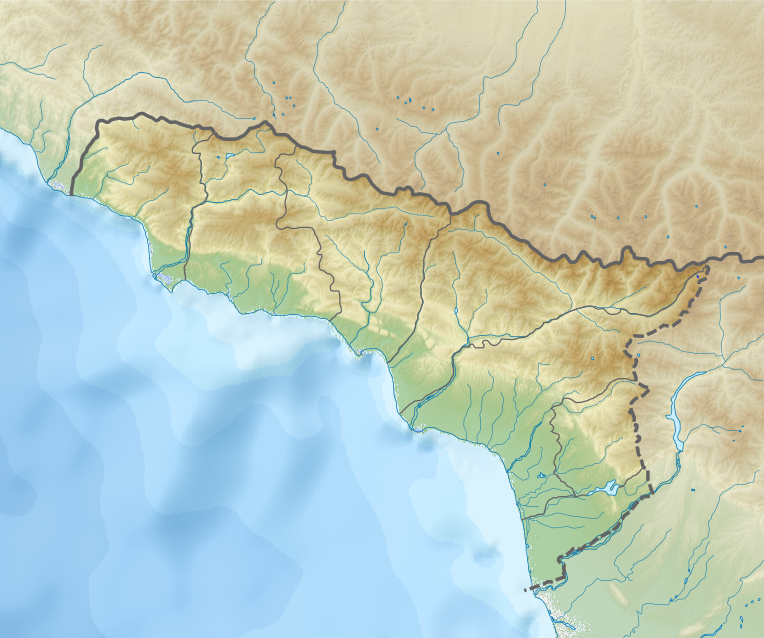
- Location within Abkhazia Location within Southern Federal District
- Coordinates: 43°35′N 39°43′EAn approximate geographical area.
- Country: Russia
- Federal subject: Krasnodar Krai

Lesser Abkhazia (Georgian: ჯიქეთი, Jiqeti) was the term used to refer to those lands of Abkhazia that were not subject to the direct control of the ruling Shervashidze dynasty. The area was part of the Black Sea Governorate during Russian rule.

Territory within the Kingdom of Georgia (Dutchy of the Abkhazes).

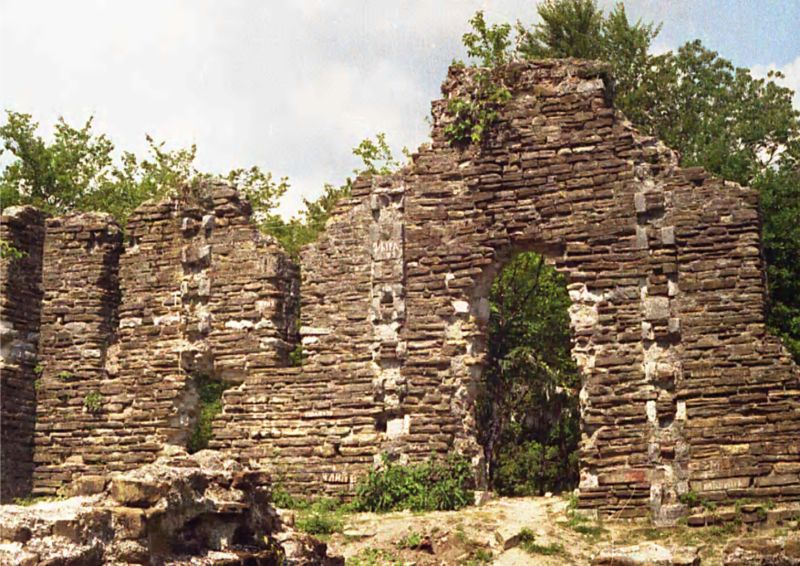
A ruined medieval Sadz church in Loo, modern-day Sochi.

== See also ==
- Principality of Abkhazia
- Ubykhia
- Upper Abkhazia
