= Abkhazian railway =

State-owned railway company in Abkhazia

Abkhazian railway Абхазская железная дорога (АЖД)
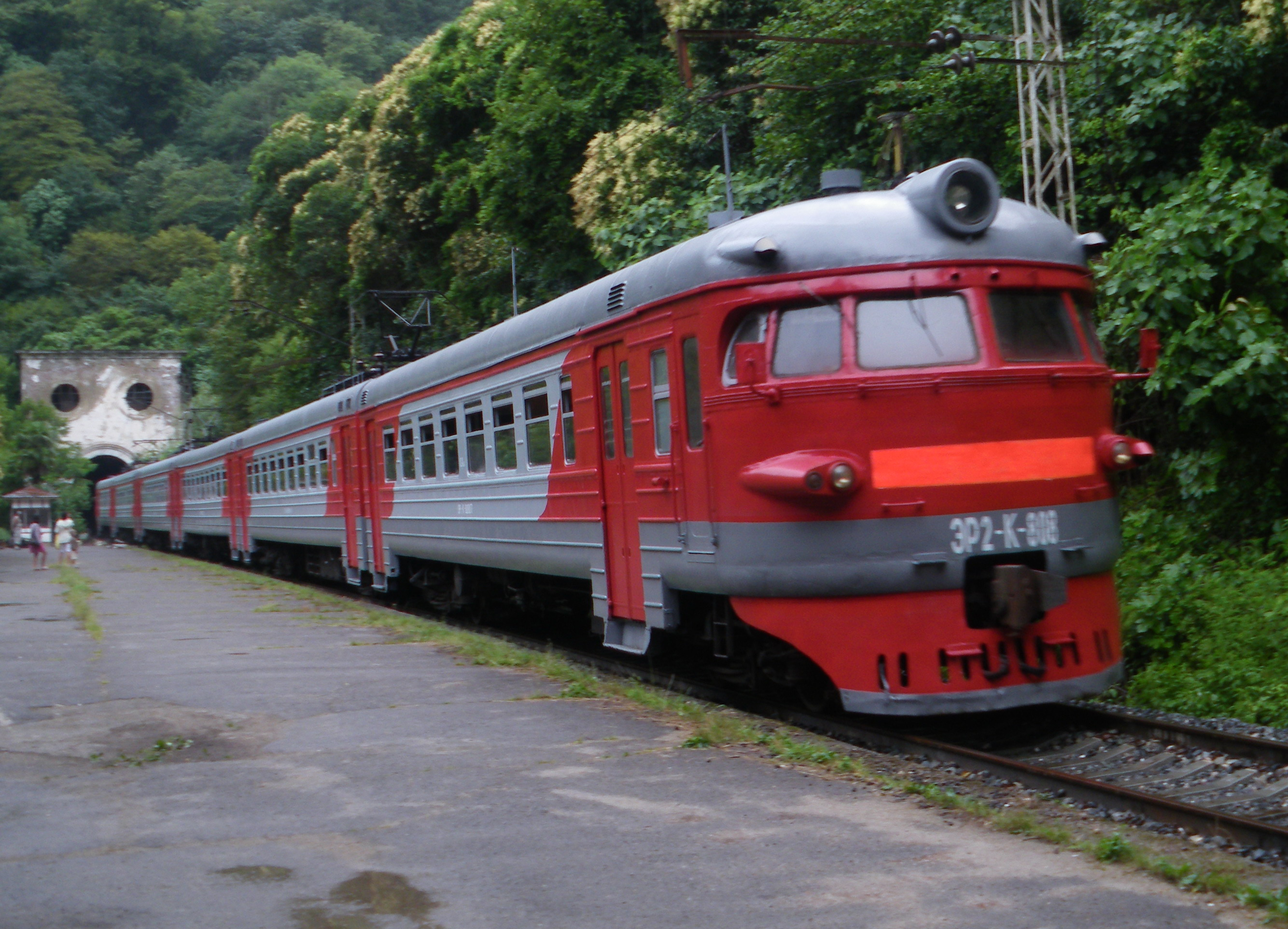
- Type: State-owned enterprise
- Industry: Rail transport
- Predecessor: Georgian Railways
- Founded: 1992; 34 years ago
- Headquarters: Sukhumi railway station, Sukhumi, Abkhazia
- Area served: Abkhazia
- Key people: Arsou Chitanava (Director)
- Services: Passenger trains, Rail transport, Cargo
- Owner: Government of Abkhazia 100%
- Website: aihamya.com

Abkhazian railway (Abkhaz: Аҧсны Аихамҩа; Russian: Абхазская железная дорога) is the state-owned railway company of the partially recognised state of Abkhazia, and managing all infrastructure and operating freight and passenger train services in Abkhazia.

== History ==
After the dissolution of the Soviet Union and damaging of the Transcaucasian Railway lines, the Samtredskoye part to the west of the Enguri River came under control of the Abkhazian railway. The bridge over the Enguri River was blown up on 14 August 1992, which was the day when Georgian forces entered Abkhazia and is the date considered as the start of the War in Abkhazia. The pretext for sending the Georgian National Guard to Abkhazia in 1992 was to protect the railroad. The bridge was subsequently restored but blown up again in 1993, after the end of the war. The track between Achigvara and the Enguri River was dismantled. The rest of the railway line also suffered greatly during the war. After the war ended, traffic was restored along the line. The railway system of Abkhazia was isolated in the 1990s, due to the blockade imposed by Russia.

On 25 December 2002, the Sochi-Sukhumi elektrichka train made its first run since the war, which led to Georgian protests. Part of the line, 60 kilometers of track between Zugdidi and Ochamchire, had been removed and sold for scrap prior to reopening. As the number of Russian tourists greatly increased in the 2000s, the Psou-Sukhumi section was mainly repaired by Russia in 2004 and on 10 September 2004 the Moscow-Sukhumi train operated by Russian Railways first arrived in the capital of Abkhazia. The Ochamchire-Sukhumi, Sochi-Sukhumi and Tkvarcheli-Sukhumi elektrichkas, that had operated at various times from 1993, no longer operated by 2007 due to various infrastructure problems. The last of the elektrichka, Gudauta-Sukhumi, was closed down on the end of 2007. The Sukhumi-Ochamchire section was restored in 2008 by Russian Railway Troops.

On 15 May 2009, the President of Abkhazia, Sergei Bagapsh, announced, that Abkhazia's railway and airport would be transferred to Russia with management rights for ten years, a decision, which caused a negative outcry in Abkhazia. According to the Abkhaz tycoon and opposition party leader, Beslan Butba, this has led to growing anti-Russian sentiment in Abkhazia. The Adler-Gagra train service was resumed on 26 June 2010 by the Don-Prigorod company.

== Activities ==
=== Passenger Traffic ===
In 2016, 307,748 people traveled between Abkhazia and Russia by rail. By 2025 this increased to 486,653 people travelling between Abkhazia and Russia.

=== Freight Traffic ===
In 2025, 16,100 freight cars with a total cargo weight of 1.1 million tons arrived in Abkhazia transported by Abkhazian Railways. This Cargo is mainly composed of coal (83%), with other materials such as fuel, lubricants and building materials making up smaller portions. To cope with this increased freight load on the network in 2023, 3 locomotives were purchased. An electric locomotive VL-10 and two diesel locomotives 2TE116 at the expense of its own budget and presidential funds of Aslan Bzhania.

== Infrastructure ==
Abkhazian railway Абхазская железная дорога Аҧсны Аихамҩа
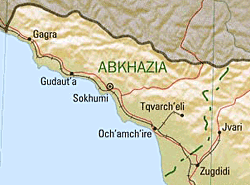

Overview
- Headquarters: Sukhumi
- Reporting mark: AŽD
- Locale: Abkhazia
- Dates of operation: 1992–present
- Predecessor: Georgian Railways

Technical
- Track gauge: 1,520 mm (4 ft 11 27/32 in)
- Electrification: 25 kV AC
- Length: 221 km (137 mi)

The railway consists of a 221 km (137 mi), single-track rail line along the Black Sea coast. Built to 1,520 mm (4 ft 11 27/32 in) Russian gauge, it connected Russia's North Caucasus Railway with Georgian Railways prior to 1992. This connection was severed as a result of the War in Abkhazia.

Russian Railways restored a 130 km section of the railway in mid-2011 using a 2 billion ruble loan from the Russian government. Regular passenger services from Moscow and Sochi were also restored.

=== Operation ===
The railway is administered by the Abkhazskaya Zheleznaya Doroga (Russian: Абхазская Железная Дорога, Abkhaz: Аҧсны Аиҳаамҩа) company. As of 2016, there is a daily long-distance train between Moscow and Sukhumi, and some suburban trains between Adler and Gagra.

Currently, there is only one train connection from the Russian Federation to Abkhazia. The train from Moscow to Sukhumi operates daily at the high touristic season in summer and twice a week at the low season. The additional trains from Belgorod and St. Petersburg operate during the summer months which is the main tourist season.

=== Link to Georgia ===
There have been proposals to re-establish rail traffic between Russia and the Trans-Caucasian countries of Armenia and Georgia through Abkhazia. Abkhazia and Russia signed a protocol on repairing the Abkhazian stretch in October 1995, but Georgia has long tied the restoration of rail traffic with the return of refugees to Abkhazia. Negotiations to restore the railway link between Georgia and Abkhazia were held in 2004-2005, but ultimately stalled.

In late 2012 and early 2013, the new Georgian government under Prime Minister Ivanishvili repeatedly proposed to revamp the Abkhazian Railway and getting it hooked on the Georgian Railways, specifically to appease Armenia, and enabling a commercial link to Russia. The proposal sparked domestic and international discussion in Armenia (the country with the most commercial interest in such a connection), in Azerbaijan (which has fears it enables Russia with a more efficient military transport to its base in Gyumri, Armenia) and in Russia (Russian Railways owning the Armenian-based South Caucasus Railways).

The Abkhaz authorities first reacted dismissively to cooperate with such initiative, but later changed their tone. Azerbaijan shortly threatened with consequences for the Baku–Tbilisi–Kars railway connection, then due completion at the end of 2013, and suggested raising the gas price charged to Georgia. In Georgia the idea of the railway being reopened on the occupied territories still faces significant opposition.
