= Salme, Abkhazia =

Estonian village in Abkhazia, Georgia

Salme სალმე (Georgian) Ԥсоу (Abkhaz)
- Village
- Etymology: From the Estonian female given name Salme
- Location within Georgia Location within Abkhazia
- Coordinates: 43°26′N 40°02′E
- Country: Georgia (de jure); Abkhazia (de facto)
- Municipality: Gagra
- Rural administration: Gyachrypsh
- Settled: 1884
- Elevation: 550 m (1,800 ft)

Salme (Georgian: სალმე), also known as Psou (Abkhaz: Ԥсоу) is a village in the Gagra District of Abkhazia. It lies near the Black Sea coast, on the left bank of the Psou River, about 25 km north of Gagra, and falls within a Russian-controlled border security zone. Administratively, it is treated by Georgia as part of Gagra Municipality, while since the 1992–1993 war in Abkhazia it has been governed de facto by the separatist Republic of Abkhazia.

The village was established in 1884 by Estonian settlers and became one of the principal Estonian colonies in the Caucasus. Salme has historically been an agricultural community. During the Soviet era it was organized into collective farms, and in the post-war period subsistence farming and cross-border trade have predominated. The population, once overwhelmingly Estonian, declined sharply after the 1990s conflict, when hundreds were evacuated to Estonia. Today it remains the largest Estonian community in Abkhazia and retains limited Estonian-language schooling and cultural activities.

== Name ==
=== Official name ===
The official name of the village is disputed between Georgian and Abkhaz authorities. According to Georgia, it is officially known as Salme (Georgian: სალმე), a name received in 1885, having previously been referred to in Russian administration as Estonskaja ("Estonian village").

Following the 1992–1993 war in Abkhazia, the de facto authorities of the self-proclaimed Republic of Abkhazia adopted a resolution on 4 December 1992 renaming the settlement "Psou" (Abkhaz: Ҧсоу), after the Psou River, which flows along the Abkhaz–Russian border adjacent to the village. In Abkhaz, the form Psou-akhabla ("Psou settlement") is also used, though the official decree used only Psou. Abkhaz sources frequently describe Salme as the "Estonian name for Psou" and claim that Psou was the locality's original name, despite the fact that no settlement existed there before its foundation by Estonian migrants.

Under Georgian law, however, the official name of the village remains Salme. The Government of Georgia continues to treat all unilateral acts of the de facto authorities in Abkhazia, including renamings, as legally void. Since 2008, Georgia's Law on Occupied Territories has explicitly declared null and without consequence any such acts issued by authorities in Abkhazia.

In Abkhaz- and Russian-language materials aligned with the separatist administration, the name Psou predominates, while Georgian legislation and international actors often retain Salme. For example, the European Union Monitoring Mission (EUMM) has referred to its field work in "the ethnic Estonian village of Salme, in Abkhazia." Among local inhabitants, the historical name Salme also continues to be widely used.

=== Etymology ===
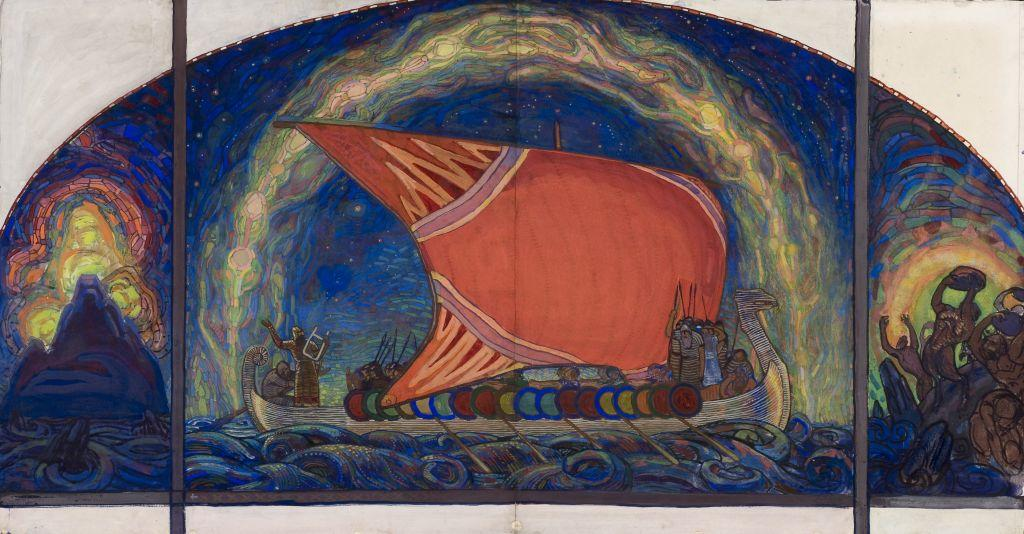
Salme likely derives its name from a female character in the Estonian national epic Kalevipoeg.

The settlement was officially given the name Salme in 1885, after a common Estonian female given name that also figures prominently in Estonian folklore and literature, in line with a series of other Estonian settlements in the Caucasus: villages such as Salme, Linda, and Sulevi drew their names from characters in the Estonian national epic Kalevipoeg, while others, like Estonia and Novo-Estonija ("New Estonia"), referred directly to the settlers’ homeland. In contrast, Russian imperial officials often imposed generic or collective labels, such as Estonskaja ("Estonian [village]"), a designation also used for Salme during the late imperial period before the name Salme was formally recognized.

According to later accounts, the name was proposed by Jüri Ponamar, a former ship's captain among the settlers, in parallel with the contemporaneous naming of Linda village, with which Salme forms a literary pairing in Estonian folklore. Modern villagers sometimes offer alternative explanations, such as linking the name to the eponymous Salme village in the Estonian island of Saaremaa, however most of the first settlers originated from the region of Kuusalu in mainland Estonia and had no known ties to Saaremaa.

Some Abkhaz sources have claimed that Psou was the original name of the settlement, though no village existed before the arrival of Estonian colonists in the 1880s. Abkhaz toponymist V. E. Kvarchia has also noted a resemblance between Salme and the name of Hajji Salam, a prince of the local Tsanba clan who ruled the area until the 1860s. This, however, is not considered a genuine etymological connection as no evidence exists in Estonian or local records to suggest that the settlers named the village after him.

== History ==
=== Founding ===
Timeline of Salme
Historical affiliations

Russian Empire, 1884–1918
Kuban-Black Sea Soviet Republic, 1918
Democratic Republic of Georgia, 1918–1921
Russian SFSR, 1924–1929
Abkhaz SSR, 1929–1931
Abkhaz ASSR, 1931–1990
Republic of Georgia, 1990–1992
Abkhazia, 1992–present

Before the arrival of Estonian settlers, the site of present-day Salme was a dense, swampy woodland prone to malaria, which discouraged permanent habitation. Historically, the area formed part of the territory known as Gechrypsh, associated with the noble Gechba family, whose prince Rashid Gechba maintained a residence there in the mid-19th century. In the mid-19th century, the region was profoundly reshaped by muhajirism, when large numbers of Muslim Abkhazians were expelled or emigrated to the Ottoman Empire following the Russian victory in the Caucasian War in 1864. The depopulation of the Psou river valley gave the imperial government the opportunity to promote colonization. From the 1860s onwards, authorities settled Georgians (especially Mingrelians), Russians, Armenians, Greeks, Bulgarians, Latvians, Germans, and later Estonians in Abkhazia, both to stimulate agriculture and to secure the empire's volatile borderlands with loyal Christian populations.

Abkhaz historians have suggested that a small plot of land where Salme lays today had been worked in earlier decades under the serfdom of a Jiketi prince, though it lay abandoned by the 1860s. In any case, when Estonians arrived in the 1880s, the land at Salme was still regarded as largely unsettled forest, cleared and cultivated only after colonization began.

In 1884, a group of Estonian peasants from Kuusalu Parish in northern Estonia resolved to establish a new settlement on the left bank of the Psou River. Their decision followed several public meetings in late 1883 and Candlemas 1884, where rising rents, loss of common lands, and restrictions on hunting were debated. At these meetings the villagers voted to emigrate and to send scouts to locate land, considering both the St. Petersburg Governorate and the Black Sea coast. On 20 February 1884, community leader Juhan Lindvest left Kuusalu with funds collected "per male soul" for the journey. Near Sukhumi he found only poorer upland plots, but on his return he encountered a Latvian who directed him to unused crown land near Adler. There he examined roughly 1,300 hectares of forest and wetland on the Psou's left bank. The state offered a cash grant of 40 rubles once a first shelter was built, access to soft loans, and reduced railway tariffs for resettling families, with children under ten traveling free. Although the Black Sea administration briefly froze new in-movers in spring 1884, Kuusalu's petition was approved on 23 August 1884 by Black Sea District chief Nikolai Nikiforaki, and on 9 October a nominal roll of 62 families was approved for settlement.

The first families began moving in May 1884, with the main body following after the permits were granted. On 21 and 31 October two groups received travel certificates, and on 1 November 1884 they departed Estonia by rail and continued by ship to Adler. On 1 December a general meeting was held on the Adler shore, where the settlers chose community leaders and decided to name the lower part of their new settlement "Salme". In the following days they crossed the Psou, divided homestead plots by lot, and began marking out farmland. By early 1885 additional families established an "upper" settlement that would become the neighboring village of Sulevi, which at first was administratively part of the same community. In official documents and maps of the 1880s both Salme and Sulevi were grouped together under the name Estonskaja ("Estonian village"), and only in 1900 was Sulevi recognized under its own name following the opening of a village school.

The first impressions of the Psou lowlands were of wilderness, dense forest, marshes, wild animals, and frequent outbreaks of malaria. Settlers wrote of wolves, bears, and vipers in the thickets and of the hardships of cutting forest, digging drainage canals, and defending their households in isolation. Yet they also remarked on the fertility of the soil, with one settler writing, "Here we will be masters ourselves." By late 1884 and early 1885 the village took form with about 1,200 desiatina of cleared ground, where settlers erected shelters and planted plum orchards, vegetable plots, and market gardens. Within two years the population had expanded with further arrivals from Kuusalu, as well as families from Kolga and Kõnnu parishes, and the settlement of Salme became a permanent feature of the Psou valley. Salme and Sulevi belonged administratively to the Sochi District of the Black Sea Governorate, while the other Estonian colonies of Abkhazia lay in the Sukhumi District of Kutaisi Governorate.

By the late 1880s the settlers had erected a small sawmill and a fruit-drying house, cleared large tracts of forest, and drained the swamps. Plum orchards were planted, along with vegetable plots. The subtropical climate led to a gradual switch away from northern grains toward maize; later, fruit and tobacco were added. Produce was sold in nearby towns such as Gagra, Adler, and Sochi. Yet the site's marshy conditions continued to bring malaria, known locally as "swamp fever" or "cold disease," which left settlers weak and disfigured and carried off many children. Hunger was common in the early years, families surviving on millet porridge and herbs until new crops took root. Some settlers considered leaving the Psou lowlands altogether, with proposals to move toward the Bzyb valley, and several families returned to Estonia or resettled elsewhere in the Caucasus. Those who remained endured, encouraged by community leaders known as Meibbaum and Kratsov, and eventually prospered through tobacco and corn planting and the steady sale of vegetables at coastal markets.

A school was organized in the late 19th century, where Estonian children learned to read and write alongside religious instruction. Freed rooms after harvest served for choir rehearsals, amateur plays, lectures, and Sunday meetings. Choirs formed in both Salme and Sulevi and sometimes joined together for larger performances. Villagers pooled funds to build up a small library of Estonian books. The colony also maintained links to the Russian Lutheran Church and took part in larger cultural Estonian activities, sending choirs to the 1914 Estonian Song Festival in Sukhumi.

On the eve of the First World War the village had become relatively prosperous. Families cultivated tobacco, maize, and gardens of potatoes, cabbage, and carrots, kept small livestock, and carried produce to markets in Sukhumi and Sochi. A major fire in the 1910s destroyed dozens of houses, barns, and stores of grain, remembered as one of the worst disasters after the malaria years.

=== Disputes ===
In 1917, at the beginning of the Russian Civil War, the Estonian settlements in the Caucasus showed neutrality toward all warring factions, but that did little to prevent raids: from 1917 to 1921 Salme and other Estonian villages were plundered by Red and White troops as well as Georgian Mensheviks. Horses, carts, hay, and food were seized, leaving families with heavy losses. Villagers tried to avoid mobilization orders issued by every side and some armed themselves against intruders. The village briefly came under control of the Kuban-Black Sea Soviet Republic, before becoming a battling ground between the Democratic Republic of Georgia (DRG) and Anton Denikin's White movement amidst the Sochi conflict.

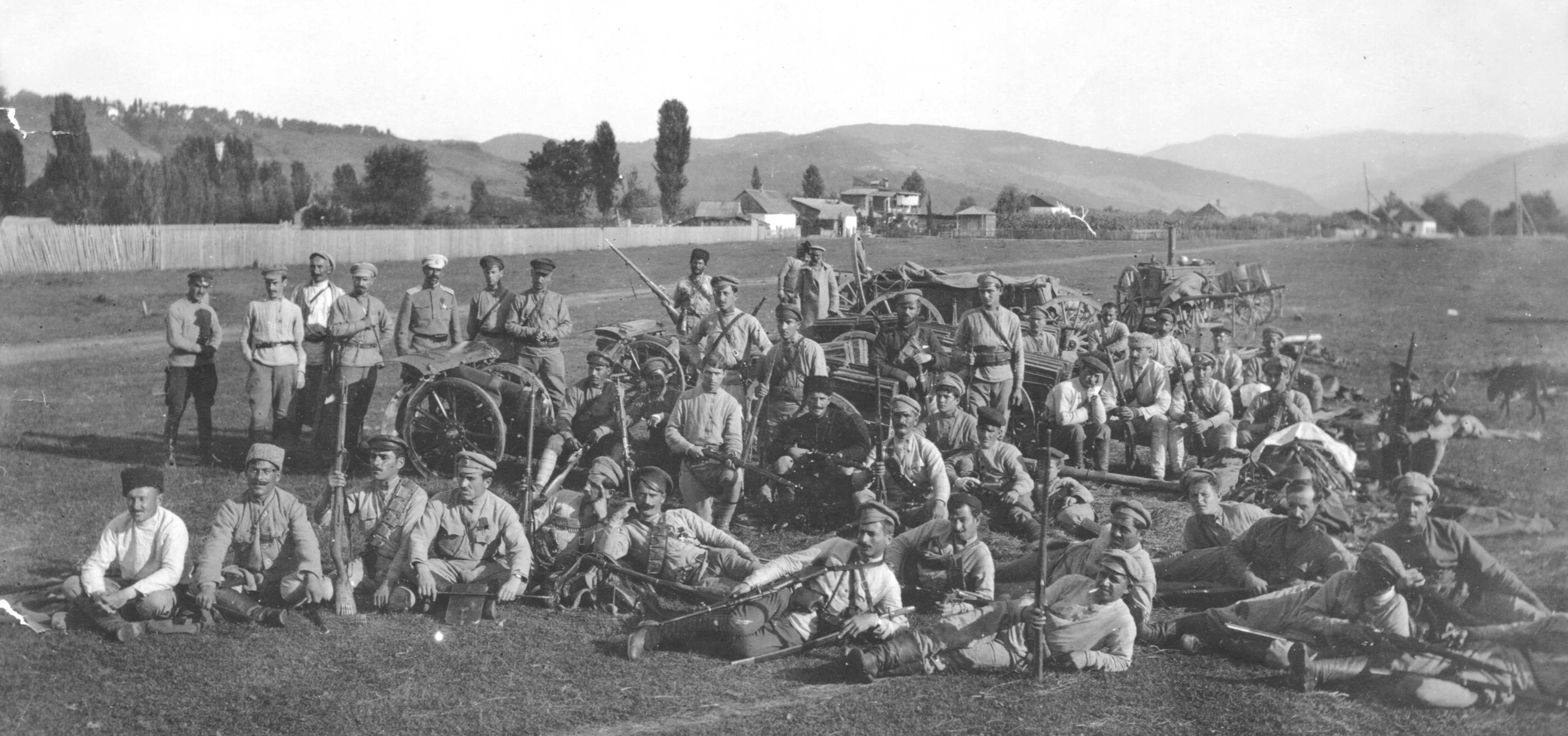
Georgian artillerymen stationed in nearby Sochi in 1919.

Memoirs from Salme and other Estonian villages in the North Caucasus record repeated looting and requisitions of food and livestock, and constant fears of reprisals from both Georgian troops and insurgent bands. Salme experienced raids by both Red and White detachments; some villagers were executed or taken hostage. The corridor of the Psou valley, including Salme, was at the center of claims by the DRG, the Russian State, Soviet Russia, and the Mountain Republic of the North Caucasus, with Estonian media reports in 1918 on Salme stating that, "new laws were constantly imposed, but settlers often had little or no way of learning about them in time."

By May 1919, a British-negotiated settlement set the Russian-Georgian border along the Psou river, formally placing Salme into Georgian territory. Nonetheless, by 1920, the area along the Psou valley became a corridor for White forces retreating from the Kuban and, soon after, for Red Army detachments pressing south, leaving Salme vulnerable to new skirmishes and instability. Settlers hid belongings or moved temporarily to Gagra or Sukhumi when raids came through. White units carried out punitive actions, and local Armenian bands allied with the Whites forced families to flee.

The Treaty of Moscow in May 1920 fixed the Georgian–Soviet frontier along the Psou, again assigning Salme to Georgia. At the same time, Article III of the treaty created a neutral zone roughly 5 km on both sides of the border, to remain demilitarized until 1922, and Salme ended up within the demilitarized zone. Memoirs recall the confusion this caused, Soviet troops pulling back across the Psou while Georgian forces withdrew south to the Mekhadyra River, leaving Salme and Sulevi between them in what was described at the time as a "no man’s land". British officers had insisted on the neutral zone and even considered placing a peacekeeping detachment there. Residents of five villages, including Salme, now lived de facto outside the jurisdiction of any state, even though they had been internationally recognized as part of the Democratic Republic of Georgia.

The Treaty of Moscow required the DRG to recognize the autonomy of ethnic minorities, while the 1920 Treaty of Tartu between Soviet Russia and Estonia encouraged Soviet authorities to push for Abkhaz Estonian communities to seek Estonian citizenship. Tbilisi allowed Salme to maintain its Estonian-language schools and churches, but the situation brought administrative difficulties. Estonians of Salme had long dealt with the nearby Russian Sochi administration; now they were expected to work through the Moscow Estonian Committee or with the Estonian Consulate in Tbilisi, with which many had never had contact. Because of the neutral zone, officials hesitated, but on 11 January 1921 Estonia accepted the applications from Salme residents. Passports were sent to the Moscow Estonian Committee with instructions to distribute them. On petitions from Salme, clerks wrote in red pencil: “From the neutral strip. Not to be submitted to the Russian government.” Within a week of the Red Army's conquest of Georgia in February 1921, about 200 Estonians from the neutral strip received Estonian citizenship certificates.

Map of the Abkhaz SSR, showing the Psou valley as part of Russia until 1929.

From 1921 to 1924 Salme laid inside a neutral zone of about six kilometres wide between the Russian and Abkhaz Soviet republics. In 1924, the territory was annexed to the Russian Soviet Federative Socialist Republic, before being transferred to the Abkhaz Soviet Socialist Republic in 1929. In 1931, Abkhazia was downgraded to the status of an autonomous republic within the Transcaucasian Socialist Federative Soviet Republic, which lasted until 1936, after which the territory, including Salme, became part of the Georgian Soviet Socialist Republic.

=== Soviet era ===
Under Soviet administration, Salme, along with the other Abkhaz Estonian villages, was incorporated into the Gagra district authorities and village-level local government ended; administration was carried out through the Leselidze Village Soviet. A local Committee of Poor Peasants was formed, targeting wealthier households for confiscations and redistributing land, livestock, and grain. Under the New Economic Policy some private trade remained, but villagers suffered from heavy taxation and pressure from officials. By the late 1920s Salme and Sulevi were organized into the kolkhoz Kommunar and by 1931–32 collectivization was complete: private farms disappeared, livestock and tools were absorbed into collective ownership, and families labelled as kulaks faced confiscations, exile, or repression.

The 1920s still allowed some Estonian-language schooling under korenizatsiia. Salme maintained a primary school teaching in Estonian, but by the mid-1930s instruction shifted to Russian. A cultural house, kindergarten, and medical station were opened. At the same time the Great Terror of 1937–38 struck the Estonian villages. Archival records show arrests and executions of Salme residents accused of ties to "foreign states." Religious practice was forced underground after the Lutheran congregation was dissolved. Specific victims include Voldemar Raja, executed in December 1937, and Osvald Kevvai, executed in 1938 after arrest in the village. Salme was among villages denounced as part of a supposed "pan-German fascist organization."

During the Second World War, men from Salme were conscripted by the Gagra military commissariat. Many were assigned to the 8th Estonian Rifle Corps. Tobacco, maize, vegetables, and fruit were requisitioned for the army; women, teenagers, and the elderly carried out most of the farm work. By summer 1942 the Wehrmacht had reached Adler and Sochi, placing the Psou as a frontline. Though German troops did not cross into Abkhazia, fighting was visible and audible from Salme.

Collective agriculture resumed under the Stalin Kolkhoz of the Leselidze Village Soviet (later renamed Druzhba Kolkhoz). Traditional crops gave way to Soviet plans emphasizing tobacco, tea, and citrus, though Salme retained its reputation for market gardening. Notable residents recognized as Heroes of Socialist Labour included chairman Hans Severin, agronomist Vambol Yanes, brigade leader Voldemar Romm, team leader Mikhail Konno, and tobacco workers Ilda Lokk and Maimo Mazikas. A 1947 propaganda film featured Salme and its kolkhoz as a model Estonian-Georgian community. The village also received visitors of international stature, such as Finnish president Urho Kekkonen.

Demographic change accelerated. The repressions of the late 1930s were followed by the resettlement of Armenians from Turkey and Svans and Mingrelians from the Georgian highlands, leaving Estonians a minority in their own villages. The 1959 census recorded 1,268 inhabitants in Salme, mostly Russians and Estonians. By 1989 the village population was 1,659, with Estonians, Armenians, Georgians, and Russians.

Salme's House of Culture hosted choirs, theatre, and film, but Estonian-language performances became rarer, while Russian dominated. In the 1970s Salme's eight-year school still taught Estonian as a subject, with teachers occasionally arriving from Estonia.

=== War and post-war era ===
After the dissolution of the Soviet Union, Salme was embroiled in the 1992–1993 war in Abkhazia, with the Gagra District being one of the hardest-hit area throughout the conflict. Georgian forces originally held positions along the Gagra–Psou axis, while Abkhaz units and allied North Caucasian militias operated in the surrounding forests and mountains. Testimonies from villagers describe armed incursions, looting, shortages, and days spent hiding from bombardments.

When Abkhaz and North Caucasian militias launched their offensive on 1 October 1992, they captured Gagra and secured the Psou corridor. Salme then became a forward border post under Abkhaz control, with patrols extending to the Psou. Georgian houses in the village were burned, and Georgian sources record at least ten executions of civilians during the ethnic cleansing campaign in the village. Other accounts note that houses in the area, including those of Abkhaz residents, were looted and set on fire during the earlier Georgian advance. A number of Salme Estonians took part in the conflict, on both sides of the conflict.

The war triggered a mass exodus of Salme's Estonian population. In November–December 1992 Estonia carried out its first post-independence humanitarian mission, sending an Air Force An-26 to Gudauta to evacuate about 170 ethnic Estonians, mainly from Salme and Sulevi. Further departures followed through 1993. Estonian government figures record hundreds of repatriations from Salme. Research by ethnographer Aivar Jürgenson indicates that most evacuees resettled permanently in Estonia, especially in Viljandi and Harju counties. On 4 December 1992 the separatist Supreme Council of Abkhazia adopted a resolution renaming the village Psou, after the nearby river forming the boundary with Russia.

By the mid-1990s only a small fraction of the original community remained in Salme. Post-war reports noted abandoned and destroyed homes, some reoccupied by other groups. Agriculture was reduced to subsistence farming, though villagers maintained tobacco, maize, orchards, and beekeeping. In 2015 the total Estonian population of northern Abkhazia was close to 100 individuals.

Cultural and educational institutions persisted despite the decline. The Salme Secondary School continued to operate and by the 2000s offered once again Estonian as a subject, with support from Estonia's "Compatriots" programme. In 1997 Tallinn dispatched a teacher at the community's request. Occasional Estonian-language Lutheran services were held by visiting clergy. The village marked major anniversaries in 2014 (130 years) and 2019 (135 years), as well as the Estonian Republic's centenary in 2018.

Security conditions have remained sensitive. An Abkhaz border post was established in Salme in 1993. During the 2014 Sochi Winter Olympics, Russian forces extended a "border security zone" 11 km into Abkhazia, covering Salme and subjecting residents to patrols, inspections, and movement restrictions. Even under normal conditions the Russian border regime enforces a 2 km security strip south of the Psou, placing Salme inside a controlled zone.

== Geography ==
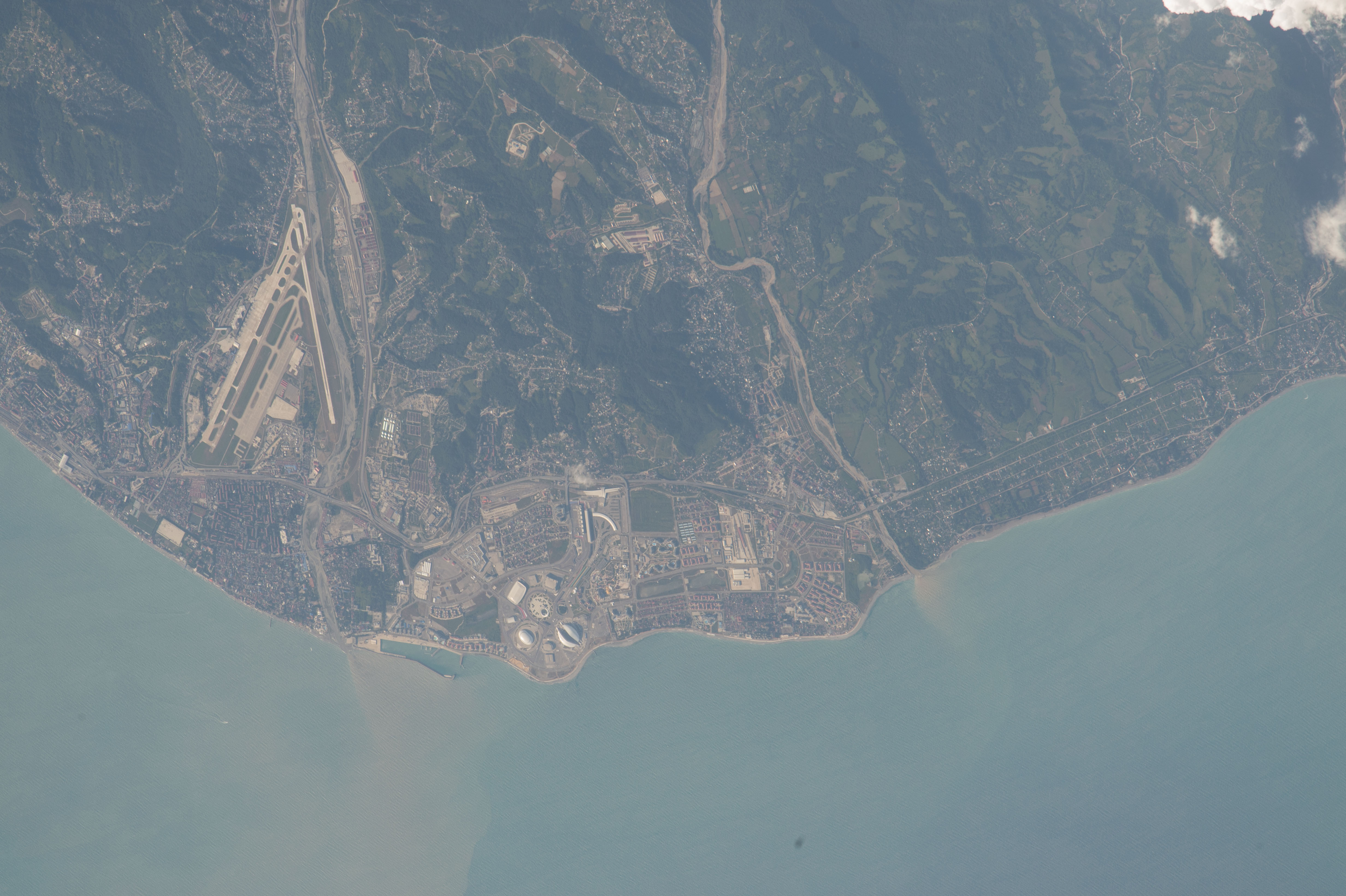
Aerial view of the Russian-Abkhaz border. Salme is one of the settlements that can be seen on the eastern bank of the Psou river.

Salme is located in northwestern Abkhazia on the Black Sea coast, immediately east of the Psou River, which forms the boundary with Russia's Krasnodar Krai. The village stands on the left bank of the Psou, about 25 km north of Gagra, at an elevation of roughly 40 m above sea level.

The site lies within the Psou River Valley, a small alluvial plain at the river mouth that opens into the Northwestern Abkhazian Coast, a narrow strip, wedged between the Black Sea and the sharply rising slopes of the Greater Caucasus. The Psou delta borders the settlement to the west, with seasonal streams and irrigation canals crisscrossing the area, while to the east and south the terrain rises into the wooded foothills of the western Caucasus. Nebo Hill, likely named after the Russian word for sky (небо) marks the boundary between Salme and Sulevi.

The soils are fertile alluvial deposits typical of floodplains. Before settlement, the area was covered by dense Colchic forest, usually composed of chestnut, beech, hornbeam, oak, alder, and linden. Much of this woodland was cleared for agriculture. Estonian settlers established fields of maize, wheat, rye, tobacco, and vegetables, along with citrus orchards, grapes, and tea plantations. By the Soviet period Salme was noted for its mandarin groves. Today, the surroundings remain a mosaic of orchards, fields, wetlands, and remnant forest.

The climate is humid subtropical. Winters are mild, with frost and snow rare; summers are long, hot, and humid, tempered by sea breezes. Rainfall is heavy throughout the year, peaking in autumn when warm sea air meets cooler currents from the mountains. The Black Sea moderates the temperature, keeping the soil unfrozen even in winter.

The environment is rich in biodiversity. Wetlands along the Psou support reeds and marsh vegetation, and the coastal plain lies on a migratory flyway for storks, herons, pelicans, egrets, and birds of prey. Nearby forests hold wild boar, jackals, wolves, and occasionally brown bears descending from the higher Caucasus.

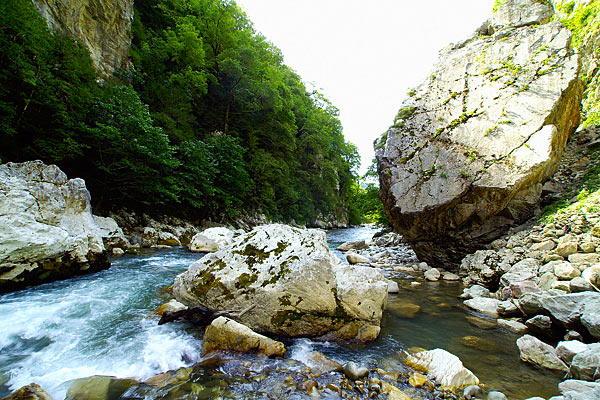
Salme's Abkhaz name, Psou, derives from the local river the settlement was originally built on.

Flooding and crop disease are recurrent natural hazards. In August 2025 heavy rainfall caused the Psou to overflow, flooding Salme, though without casualties.

== Demographics ==
Salme was established in 1884 by around 60 Estonian settlers. The original inhabitants were almost exclusively Estonian. By the early 20th century, Armenians began to arrive, particularly after 1915, when families from the Samsun region of Ottoman Turkey settled in the village.

During the Soviet period, collectivization and post-war migration diversified the population further. Census data from 1959 recorded 1,268 inhabitants, primarily Estonians, Armenians, and Russians. By 1989, the population had grown to 1,659, including Estonians (then the largest group, though no longer an absolute majority), Armenians, Georgians, Greeks, and Russians.

The 1992–1993 war in Abkhazia and subsequent ethnic cleansing of Georgians caused major demographic changes. Most of Salme's Estonian population repatriated to Estonia, either during organized evacuation flights in 1992–1993 or in later years. Estonian reports in 1997 noted about 200 Estonians remaining in Salme, many of them returnees from the wartime evacuation. By 2015, the number of ethnic Estonians in the village stood less than 100, while Armenians had become the most numerous group overall. Abkhaz and Russians also formed part of the post-war mix, while Georgians were largely absent. The overall population of Salme is now likely under 1,000.

Despite the decline, Estonian cultural institutions continued to operate. The Salme village school still offered partial instruction in Estonian as of 2015. Cultural and diaspora organizations from Estonia occasionally sent teaching materials, books, and teachers to support local education. Visiting clergy from the Estonian Evangelical Lutheran Church also held occasional services. The local Estonian community is informally organized, with its own leaders.

Estonian Language instruction has been maintained by a single teacher, Ilma Krenstrem, whose salary is paid by the Estonian state, and who was awarded by Estonian President Kersti Kaljurand the Order of the White Star, Class V, in 2020 for her work. By the late 2010s, fewer than a dozen pupils were enrolled in Estonian-language instruction in Salme.

Legal questions about citizenship have also affected the community. In 2019, Estonia recognized Estonians from the southern villages of the Sukhumi district as citizens by birth, but not those from Salme and Sulevi, whose paperwork in 1920 had been handled via the Moscow Estonian Committee rather than Tbilisi, leaving their legal status unresolved.

== Description ==
Salme was established as a linear settlement, with homesteads arranged along a central road and fields stretching behind them. This pattern produced a single axis sometimes referred to as the "colonist street," lined with Estonian-built wooden houses and farmsteads. The early dwellings were wooden houses with steep gabled roofs, plank walls, and verandas, surrounded by gardens, picket fences, and outbuildings such as barns and smokehouses.

Over time the settlement grew southward and northward along the main road (today's Highway Sh194), which connects Salme with Leselidze in the south and the village of Mikelrypsh in the north. Side lanes branch east and west into smaller clusters of houses, built more irregularly than the original core.

The village never developed a compact central square; instead, it followed the Estonian rural model of scattered farmsteads, each with its own garden and orchard. Even today, the settlement appears as a mosaic of dwellings, open plots, and dense vegetation, with continuous habitation along the road and more wooded areas at the northern and eastern edges.

The village preserves visible traces of its Estonian origins. Some street signs remain in Estonian and architectural features in older houses resemble Baltic vernacular building styles.

Internally, Salme was also organized into smaller neighborhoods. Rannaküla, a cluster of around 12–15 farms on the western side of the village, was settled by families from the Kolga coastal parish, and was considered more fishing-oriented. The rest of the settlement was referred to simply as Ülemine osa or "Salme proper". Other local toponyms recorded by fieldworkers include Karuauk ("bear pit"), Karusööt ("bear pasture"), Kitseallikas ("goat spring"), Raba koppel ("bog paddock"), Sõnajalapõld ("fern field"), and Hundimetsatükk ("wolf’s forest plot").

== Public administration ==
=== Politics and governance ===
Administratively, Salme is part of the rural administration of Gyachrypsh (known as "Leselidze" by Georgian authorities) within Abkhazia's Gagra District, which governs public services in the village and other nearby settlements. Local affairs such as utilities, permits, and policing are handled by the Abkhaz district authorities, with Russian involvement in border and security matters.

Under Georgian law, before the 1992–1993 war Salme belonged to the Leselidze Rural Council (ლესელიძის სოფლის საბჭო / сельсовет Леселидзе), which grouped together several settlements along the Psou River. Today, Georgia continues to regard the settlement as part of the Gagra Municipality in the Autonomous Republic of Abkhazia. The Law of Georgia on Occupied Territories designates the area as under Russian military occupation.

Since the 1992–1993 war, Salme – renamed Psou by separatist authorities – has been under the control of the de facto Republic of Abkhazia. Russia and a handful of other states recognize this administration, while Georgia and most of the international community do not. Following the 2008 Russo–Georgian War and Russia's recognition of Abkhazia, Russian security structures consolidated control of the border zone. Russian border practice maintains a permanent two-kilometre security strip south of the Psou, placing Salme inside a zone patrolled and restricted year-round by FSB border guards.

=== Public services and infrastructure ===
A Soviet-era eight-year school still functions in the village, known locally as Salme küla keskkool. During Soviet times it provided general education in Estonian and Russian. After the 1992–1993 war the school continued to operate, with partial Estonian-language instruction in subjects such as language, literature, and culture. Reports by the Estonian Ministry of Foreign Affairs in 2011 and 2014 confirmed that the teaching of Estonian survived in Salme, though not as a full curriculum. Support has come from Estonia and diaspora organizations, which supplied textbooks, scholarships, and visiting teachers, including through the Integration and Migration Foundation and the Estonian Cultural Society in Georgia. In at least the late 1990s the Estonian Ministry of Education also paid the salary of one returning Estonian teacher who has taught in Salme since 1997.

Alongside the school, the village contains a cultural center, kindergarten, and a small medical station, though serious health care requires travel to nearby Gagra. Utilities are provided by the Abkhaz authorities through agencies such as Gagra Vodokanal (water), Abkhazenergo (electricity from the Enguri line), and Abkhaztransgaz. The Salme section of the Psou electricity line is considered vital to the grid; damages there have in the past caused shortages across Abkhazia.

Since 2016 Salme has also hosted Abkhazia's first animal shelter. The Topa shelter, founded in response to the culling of stray dogs in Gagra, was given land in Salme by local authorities and is run by a charitable foundation. In 2019 the shelter temporarily cared for an orphaned bear cub. The project marked Salme as the first community in Abkhazia to end the culling of stray dogs. The shelter has also faced hostility: in 2018 two puppies were shot in an attack on its grounds.

== Economy ==
Salme is an agricultural village. Residents have historically cultivated tobacco, maize, vegetables, and fruit orchards, alongside livestock farming and beekeeping. During the Soviet period, collective farming was dominant, with produce sold in Gagra, Adler, and Sochi.

The Georgian–Abkhaz war of 1992–1993 brought severe disruption. Collective farms collapsed, fields and orchards were abandoned, and much of the Estonian and Georgian population fled. By the mid-1990s subsistence farming was the primary livelihood, with villagers relying on small maize fields, vegetable gardens, and modest orchards.

Today, the economy remains shaped by subsistence agriculture. Maize, vegetables, small citrus and fruit orchards, and reduced areas of tobacco continue to be cultivated. Beekeeping persists in limited form. Cross-border petty trade plays a major economic role, with Salme lying immediately south of the Psou–Adler checkpoint, the only road and rail entry between Abkhazia and Russia. Some villagers find seasonal work across the border, and shopping trips to Russia are routine.

A local road links Salme to Leselidze and the Sukhumi–Sochi highway. Inside the village, many roads remain unpaved. The Tsandrypsh railway station provides access to both Sochi and Sukhumi. Bus connections to Gagra and Sukhumi existed in Soviet times; today, irregular minibuses (marshrutkas) provide transport. Proximity to Sochi International Airport, less than 10 km away, makes Salme one of the best-connected rural localities in Abkhazia.

In 2017, local authorities reported that vegetable and fruit cultivation was being expanded in Salme and Leselidze to reduce dependence on imports and support the local tourism sector.

For ethnic Estonians in Salme, citizenship issues have complicated daily economic life. Many hold Russian passports to cross the Psou for trade and groceries. Estonia's requirement that repatriated Estonians renounce Russian citizenship has placed some villagers in a legal dilemma, since giving up Russian documents would make routine border crossing difficult. Reports also mention that some Estonians were asked for Georgian passports when entering Estonia, which were not obtainable in the village's post-war circumstances.

== Bibliography ==
- Meibaum, Vladimir (1984). Сто лет под южным солнцем : об истории эстонских сел Сальме и Сулев в Грузии [On the History of Estonian Villages Salme and Sulevi in Georgia] (in Russian). Tallinn: Eesti raamat.
- Jürgenson, Aivar (2020). "Abhaasia eestlaste kodakondsusküsimused Tartu rahulepingu, Moskva rahulepingu ja erinevate kodakondsusseaduste pingeväljas" [Citizenship Questions of Estonians in Abkhazia in the Tension between the Treaty of Tartu, the Treaty of Moscow, and Various Citizenship Laws] (PDF). TUNA (in Estonian) (1/2020). Tallinn: 28–49.
