= List of islands of Georgia (country) =

Islands in the country of Georgia include...

== Lakes ==
- Tabatskuri Lake
  - Mamia's Island (მამიას კუნძული), a rare breeding ground of velvet scoter ducks. Site of a 2023 documentary film.
  - several smaller islands.

== See also ==
- Islands in disputed regions of Georgia
  - List of islands of Abkhazia
  - List of islands of South Ossetia
- Geography of Georgia (country)
