= Gardabani Managed Reserve =

Protected nature area in Georgia

- Georgian: გარდაბნის აღკვეთილი
- IUCN category IV (habitat/species management area)
- Location within Georgia Location within Kvemo Kartli
- Location: Georgia
- Nearest city: Rustavi
- Coordinates: 41°27′11″N 45°01′21″E
- Area: 34.84 km^{2} (13.45 sq mi)
- Established: 1996
- Governing body: Agency of Protected Areas
- Website: Tbilisi National Park Administration

Gardabani Managed Reserve (Georgian: გარდაბნის აღკვეთილი) is a protected area in Gardabani Municipality and Marneuli Municipality in Kvemo Kartli region of Georgia. Reserve is located on the left bank of Mtkvari river near the Azerbaijan border at a distance of 39 km from Tbilisi. It protects floodplain forest groves as well as local fauna. It has been considered to be included into Ramsar Convention list of Wetlands of international importance. Gardabani Managed Reserve is part of the Georgian protected areas system which also includes Tbilisi National Park, Saguramo Range, Gldani, Martqopi, Gulele.

Reserve offers opportunities for bird watching, animal watching and botanical and ecological tours.

== History ==
Reserve resides in historical region of Kakheti. On Iori Plateau near the Gardabani Managed Reserve numerous archaeological sites of past settlements has been discovered dated back from the Eneolithic period to Early Iron Age. Most prominent cultural monument in this area, the David Gareja monastery complex, is located across the border in the territory of Azerbaijan.

== Flora ==
Reserve floodplain forest main specimens of trees are gray poplar (Populus × canescens), black poplar (Populus nigra), white willow (Salix alba), aspen (Populus tremula), long stalk oak (Quercus longipes), Wych elm (Ulmus glabra) and field elm (Ulmus minor). Shrubs are represented by hawthorn Crataegus heterophylla, tamarisk, cornel (Cornus mas), elder (Sambucus), and butcher's broom (Ruscus aculeatus). Floodplain forest also has variety of lianas such as Clematis, silk vine (Periploca graeca) and common hop (Humulus lupulus). Forest quickly transition into steppe primarily grown with nipplewort (Lapsana).

== Fauna ==
The kingdom of vertebrates is represented in reserve and Mtkvari River by 21 species of fishes, 4 species of amphibians, 4 species of reptiles, 135 species of birds and 26 species of mammals.

Included into Red List of Georgia is red deer (Cervus elaphus). There are also specimens of other mammals such as wild boar, hare, jackal, red fox, jungle cat, badger, and marten.

Included into Red List of Georgia are species of birds: white-tailed eagle (Haliaeetus albicilla), eastern imperial eagle (Aquila heliaca), Egyptian vulture (Neophron percnopterus), greater spotted eagle (Aquila clanga), Levant sparrowhawk (Accipiter brevipes) and saker falcon (Falco cherrug). There are also specimens of hoopoe, magpie, common blackbird (Turdus merula), chaffinch, European goldfinch (Carduelis carduelis) and nightingale.

Included into Red List of Georgia are species of fish: Wels catfishes (Silurus glanis), Black Sea roach (Rutilus frisii) and Aral spined loach (Sabanejewia aurata). There are also silver bream (Blicca bjoerkna transcaucasica) and many carps (Cyprinus carpio), common breams (Abramis brama), Caucasian goby (Ponticola constructor), and common barbel (Barbus barbus).

Reptiles represented by several species of lizards and by Greek tortoises, and also variety of snakes: vipers, grass snakes, and four-lined snake (Elaphe quatuorlineata).

== See also ==
- David Gareja monastery complex
