= Ritsa Strict Nature Reserve =

Protected nature area in Georgia (country)

- IUCN category Ia (strict nature reserve)
- Lake Ritsa

- Location within Georgia Location within Abkhazia
- Location: Abkhazia, (Note: The political status of Abkhazia is disputed. Having unilaterally declared independence from Georgia in 1992, Abkhazia is formally recognised as an independent state by 5 UN member states (two other states previously recognised it but then withdrew their recognition), while the remainder of the international community recognizes it as de jure Georgian territory. Georgia continues to claim the area as its own territory, designating it as Russian-occupied territory.) Georgia
- Coordinates: 43°29′24″N 40°37′04″E
- Area: 311.0 km^{2} (120.1 sq mi)
- Established: 1930
- Governing body: Agency of Protected Areas
- Website: Strict Nature Reserve Info

Ritsa Strict Nature Reserve (Georgian: რიწის დაცული ტერიტორია) is a protected area in the Gudauta District of Abkhazia, in the country of Georgia. The reserve's main goal is to protect Lake Ritsa and conserve the ecosystems and species located in the surrounding mountain regions.

== History ==
The USSR, where Georgia was a constituent republic, established the Ritsinsky Reserve in 1930. The reserve's territory expanded when Georgia regained independence in 1991, and the new Ritsa Strict Nature Reserve was formed. Following the commencement of the Abkhaz–Georgian conflict and subsequent war, the territory of Ritsa was taken over and is now governed by the Government of Abkhazia, which created Ritsinsky Relic National Park in 1996.

== Geography ==
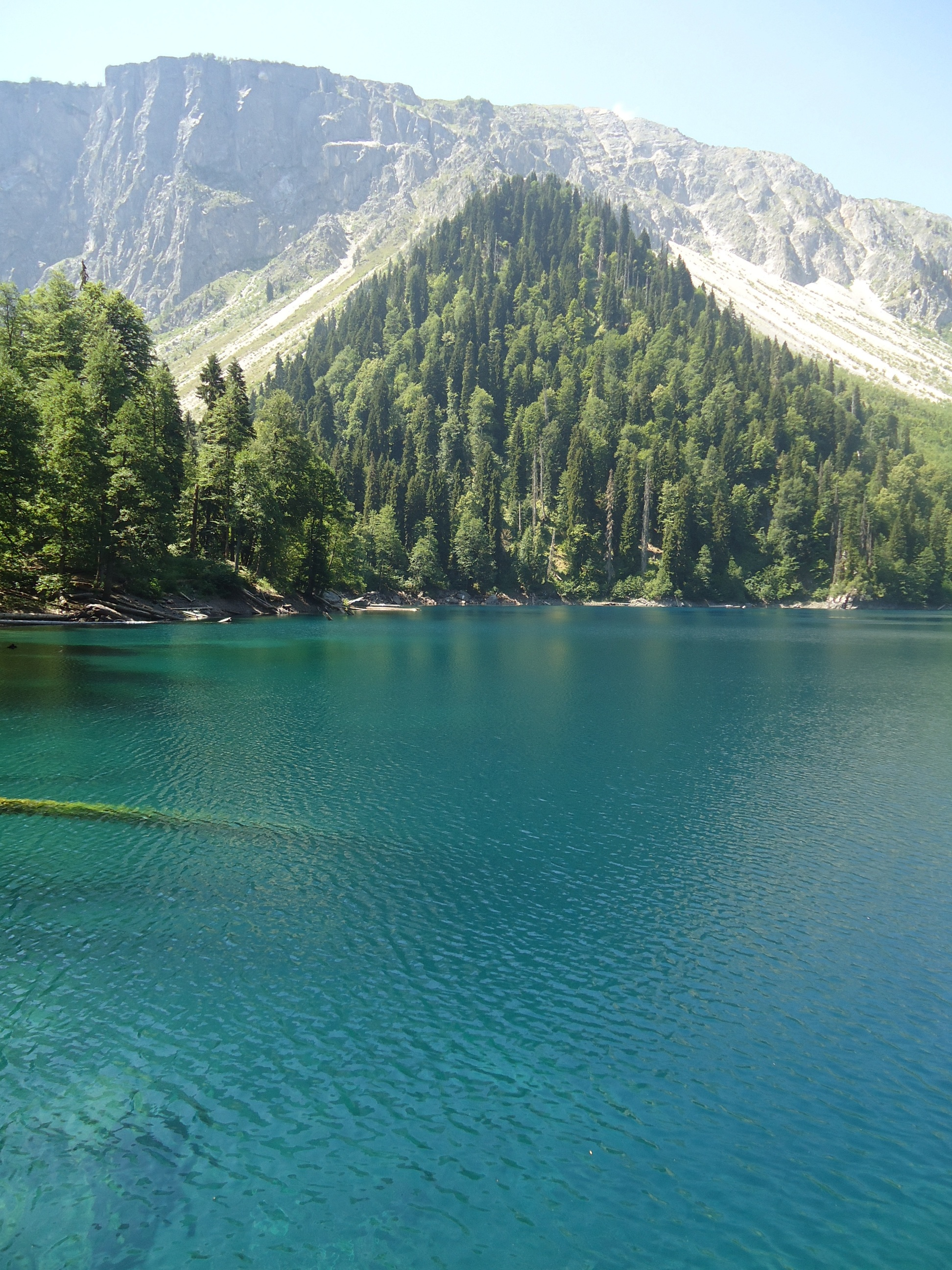
Lake Smaller Ritsa.

Ritsa Strict Nature Reserve is located in the mountainous part of Abkhazia in the southern part of the Greater Caucasus range, extending from the Ghegha River to the Pshchitsa River. The reserve's altitude ranges from 100–3,256 metres (328–10,682 ft) above sea level (Mount Agepsta), creating a rich spectrum of ecological conditions for the growth of many different plants and animals. The reserve's largest lake is Lake Ritsa. Other lakes in the reserve include Lake Smaller Ritsa and Blue Lake. There are several waterfalls in this region, the most famous being the Gegsky falls, which were featured as the "Reichenbach Falls" in the 1980 Soviet movie The Adventures of Sherlock Holmes and Dr. Watson.

== Flora ==
The protected area of Euxine-Colchic deciduous forests includes numerous evergreen boxwood (Buxus colchica) groves as well as specimens of the Nordmann fir, which can reach heights of over 70 metres. This area is also home to specimens of European yew. A variety of rare endemic species, such as Lilium kesselringianum, Primula farinosa, as well as widespread species such as the bell-flower, occur in the region.

== Fauna ==
The region's most common mammals include the Caspian red deer, the west Caucasian tur, the rupicapra, the capreolus, the wild boar, the Caucasian wildcat, the stone marten, and the European rabbit.

More than 273 bird species can be found here, of which 71 are considered rare. About 100 species of birds nest in the reserve and others fly over the park via the eastern Black Sea Flyway. The golden eagle, griffon vulture, cinereous vulture, common blackbird, great tit, Caucasian snowcock, Caucasian grouse, red-fronted Serin, Goldcrest, and common chaffinch are among the many species that can be found in the region.

There are also rare species of amphibians: the Caucasian parsley frog, the Caucasian toad, and the endemic southern banded newt.

== See also ==
- Lake Ritsa
- Lake Smaller Ritsa
