= Lake Smaller Ritsa =

Lake in the Caucasus Mountains

- პატარა რიწა
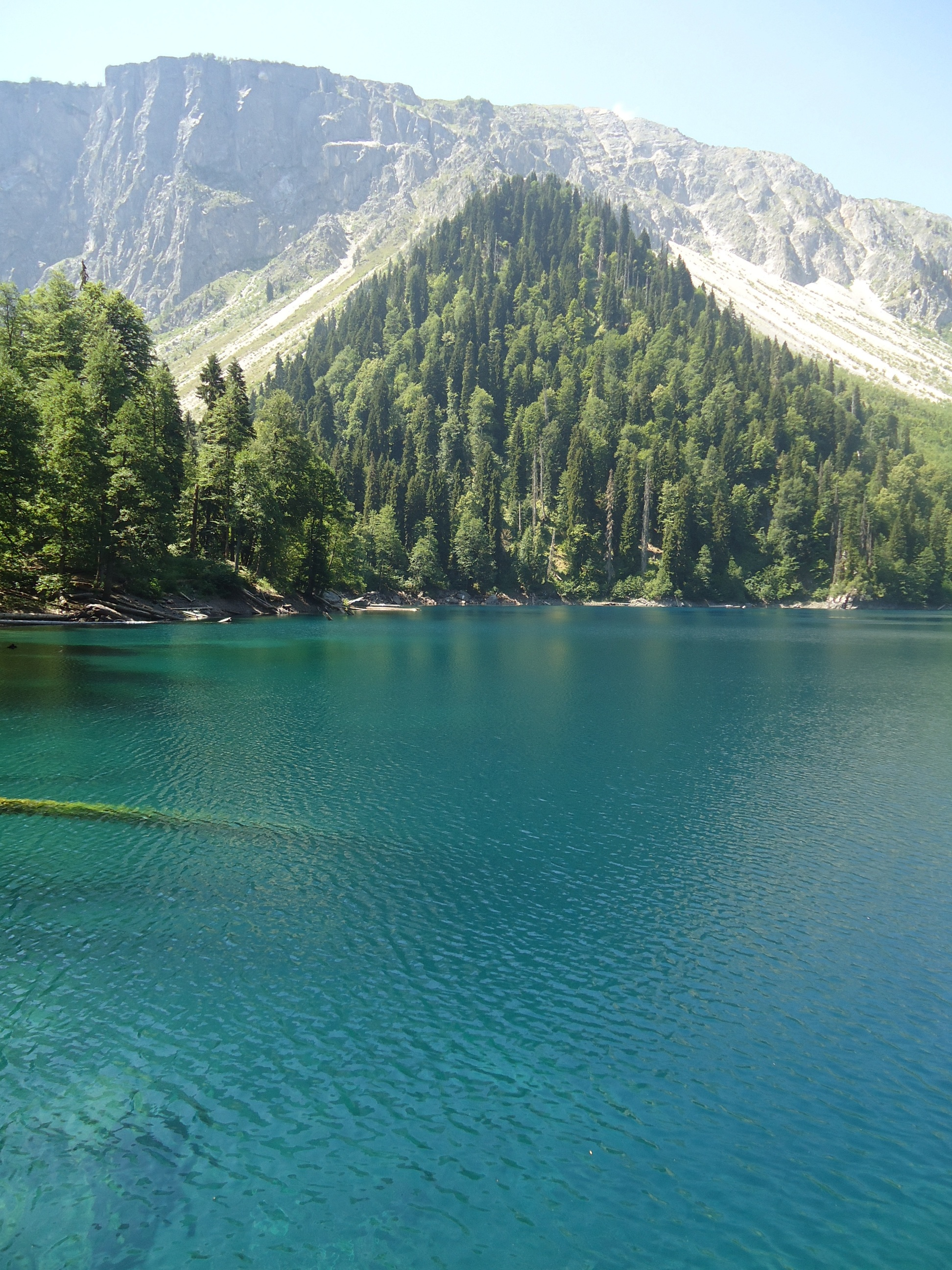
- View of Smaller Ritsa

- Location within Abkhazia Location within Georgia
- Interactive map of Lake Smaller Ritsa
- Coordinates: 43°28′31″N 40°30′11″E
- Basin countries: Abkhazia
- Max. length: 530 m (1,740 ft)
- Max. width: 290 m (950 ft)
- Surface area: .095 km^{2} (0.037 sq mi)
- Max. depth: 76 m (249 ft)
- Surface elevation: 1,235 m (4,052 ft)

Lake Smaller Ritsa (Georgian: პატარა რიწა), located in Abkhazia, is a lake in the Caucasus Mountains, surrounded by mixed mountain forests and subalpine meadows.

== Geography ==
The lake located at the Pshegishkha (2217 m) mountain bottom at the height of 1235 m, to the east from Gagra Ridge in the Iupshara River basin, 5 kilometers to the west from the lake Big Ritsa. Feeds by snow, rain and underground water. The length of the Smaller Ritsa is 530 m and the width is 290 m. Maximum depth of the lake is 76 m. Surface area is 0,095 km^{2} (37 sq mi). In the lake lives trout.

== See also ==
- Lake Ritsa
- Ritsa Strict Nature Reserve

== Sources ==
- I. Abkhazava, Georgian Soviet Encyclopedia, T. 7, p. 709, Tbilisi., 1984 year.
