= Tbilisi National Park =

National park in Georgia

- IUCN category II (national park)
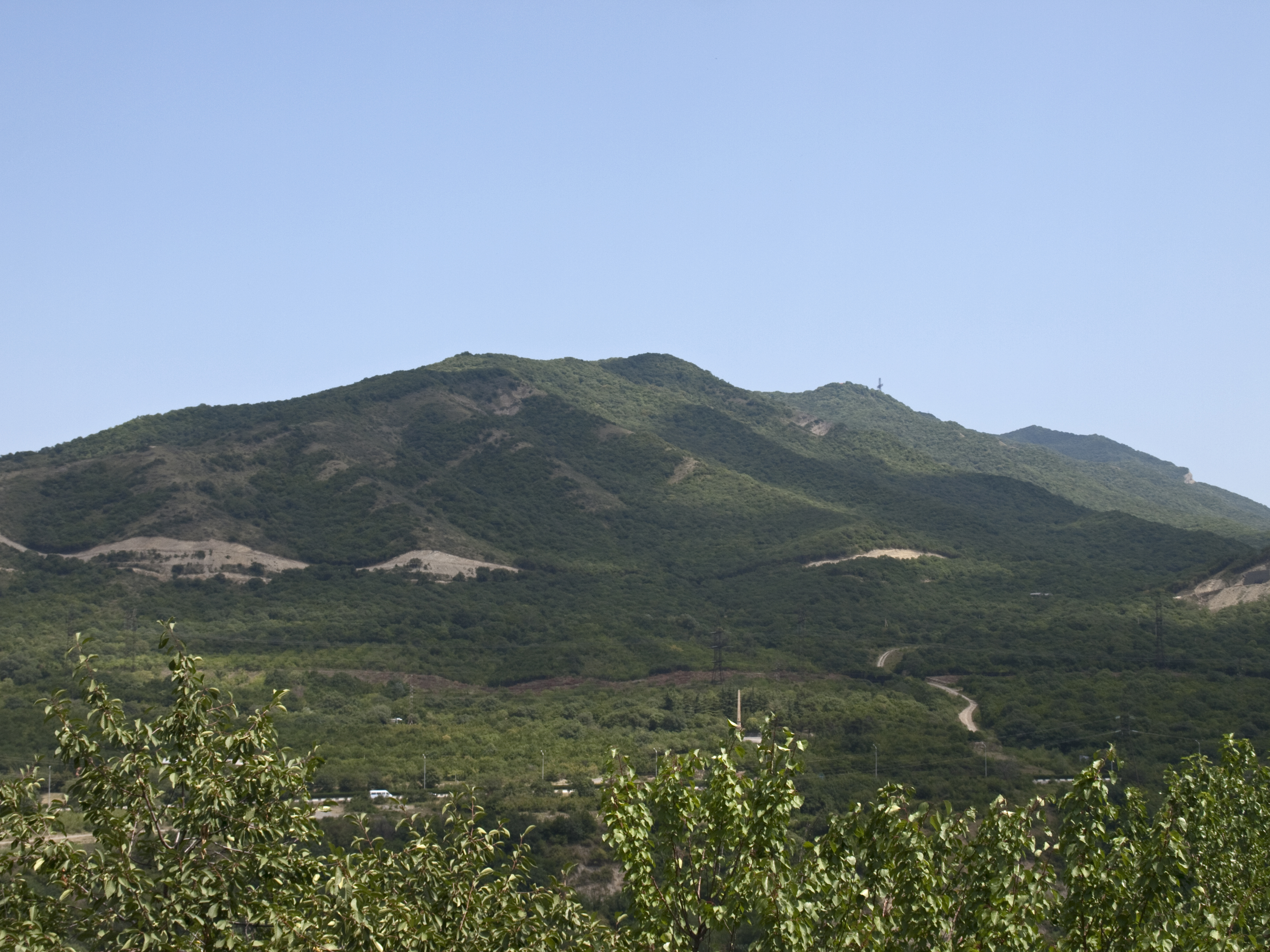
- Mountains in the western part of Tbilisi National Park, as seen from the north of Mtskheta

- Location within Georgia
- Location: Georgia
- Nearest city: Tbilisi, Mtskheta
- Coordinates: 41°52′N 44°56′E
- Area: 380.02 km^{2} (146.73 sq mi)
- Established: 1973
- Governing body: Agency of Protected Areas
- Website: Tbilisi National Park Administration

Tbilisi National Park (Georgian: თბილისის ეროვნული პარკი) is one of nine national parks in Georgia, located in Mtskheta Municipality to the north of the city of Tbilisi. The historical town of Mtskheta lies right outside of the western boundary of the park. The national park was established in 1973 on the basis of the previously existing Saguramo National Reserve (established in 1946) and is the oldest national park in Georgia. The area of the park is 243 square kilometres (94 mi^{2}).

The park is located on the slope of the Saguramo Range, east of the Aragvi River, and belongs to the drainage basin of the Kura. The highest point of the park is 1,385 metres (4,544 ft). The area of the park is mainly covered by trees and shrub of oak, hornbeam, and beech. The protected mammals in the park include red deer, lynx, Eurasian brown bear, red fox, and jackal.

The paved road connecting Tbilisi and Tianeti crosses the central part of the park, traversing the Saguramolalno Range. A stretch of the Tbilisi bypass highway runs along the southwestern border of the park.

== Gallery ==
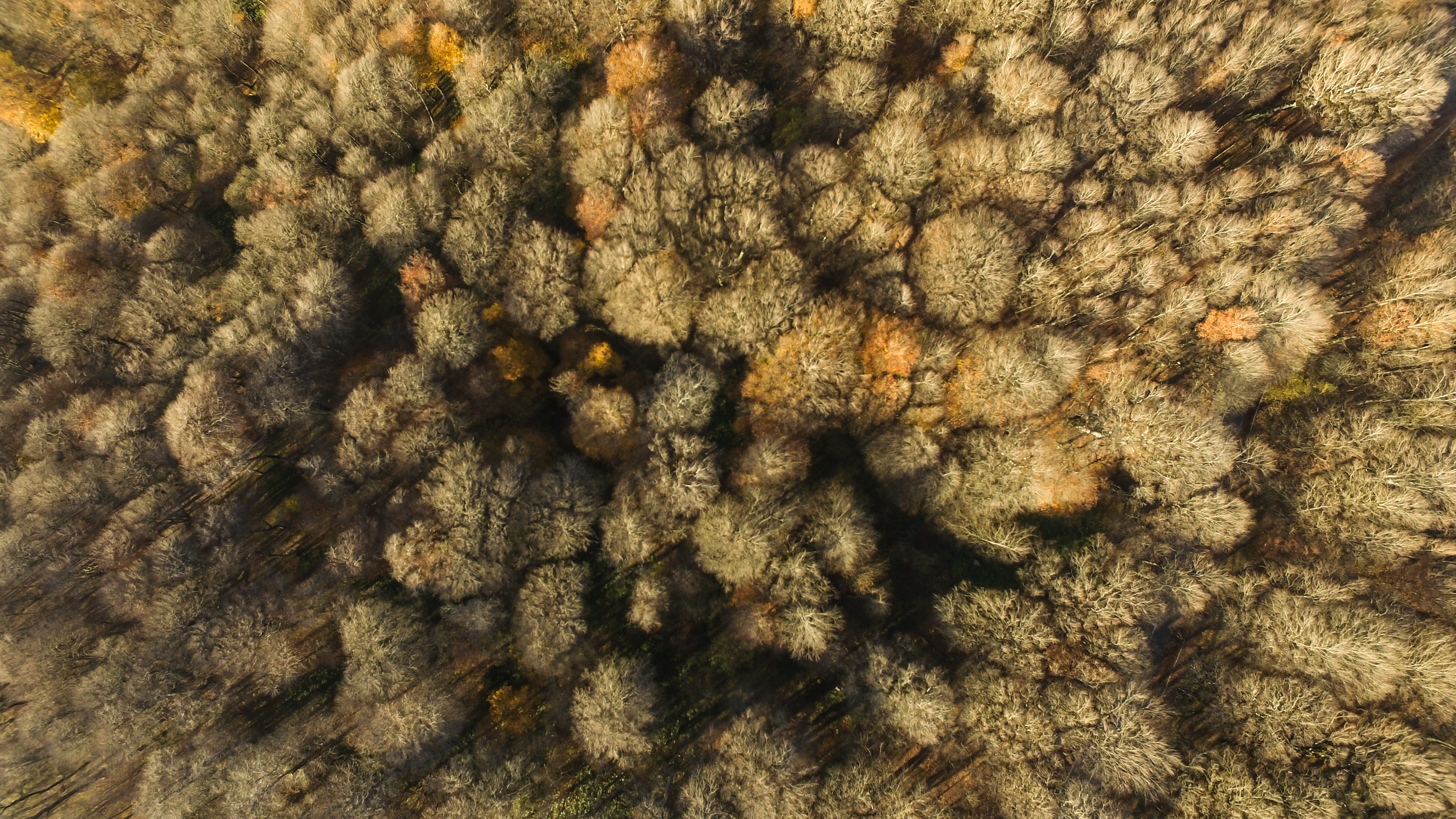

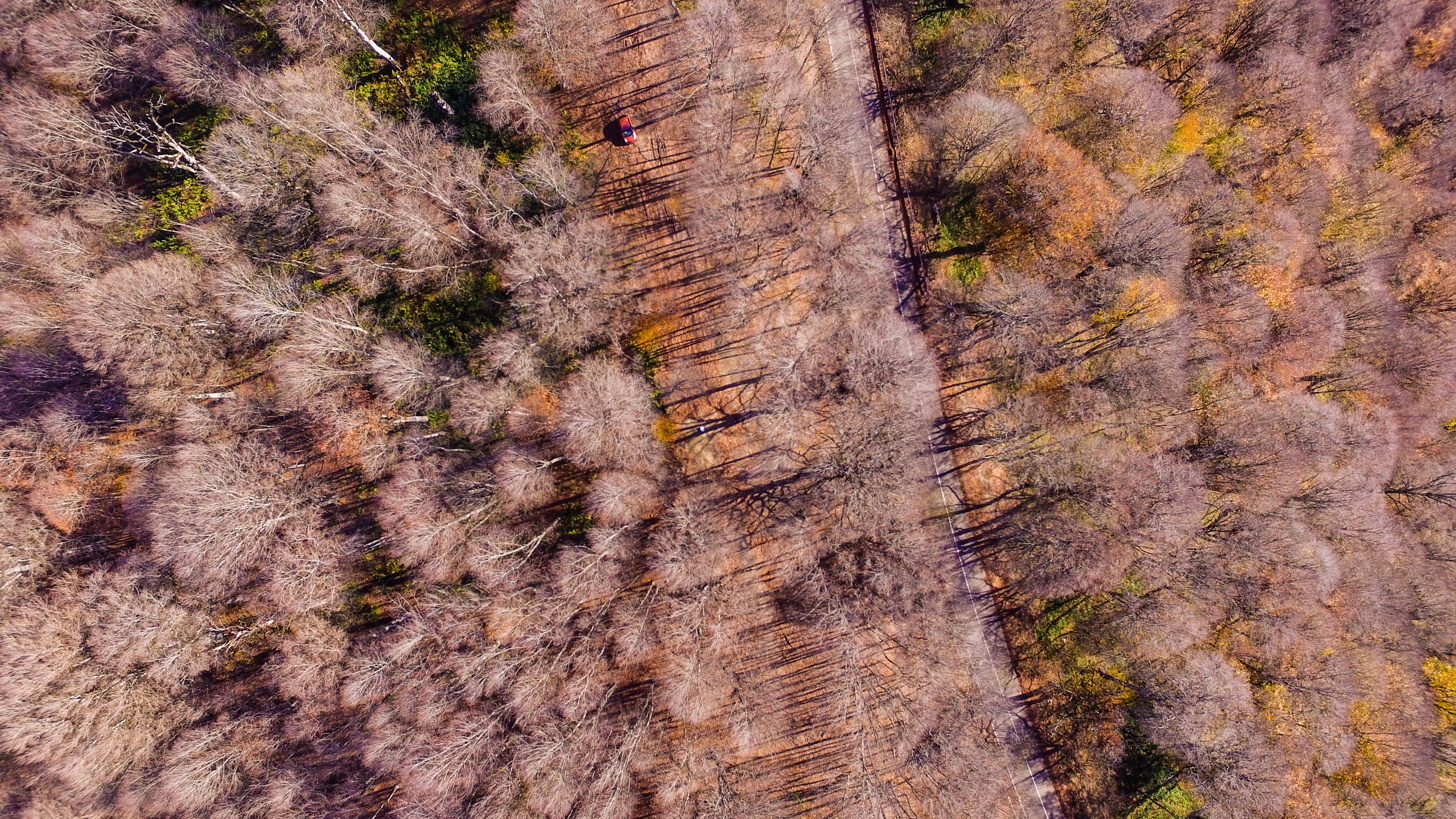

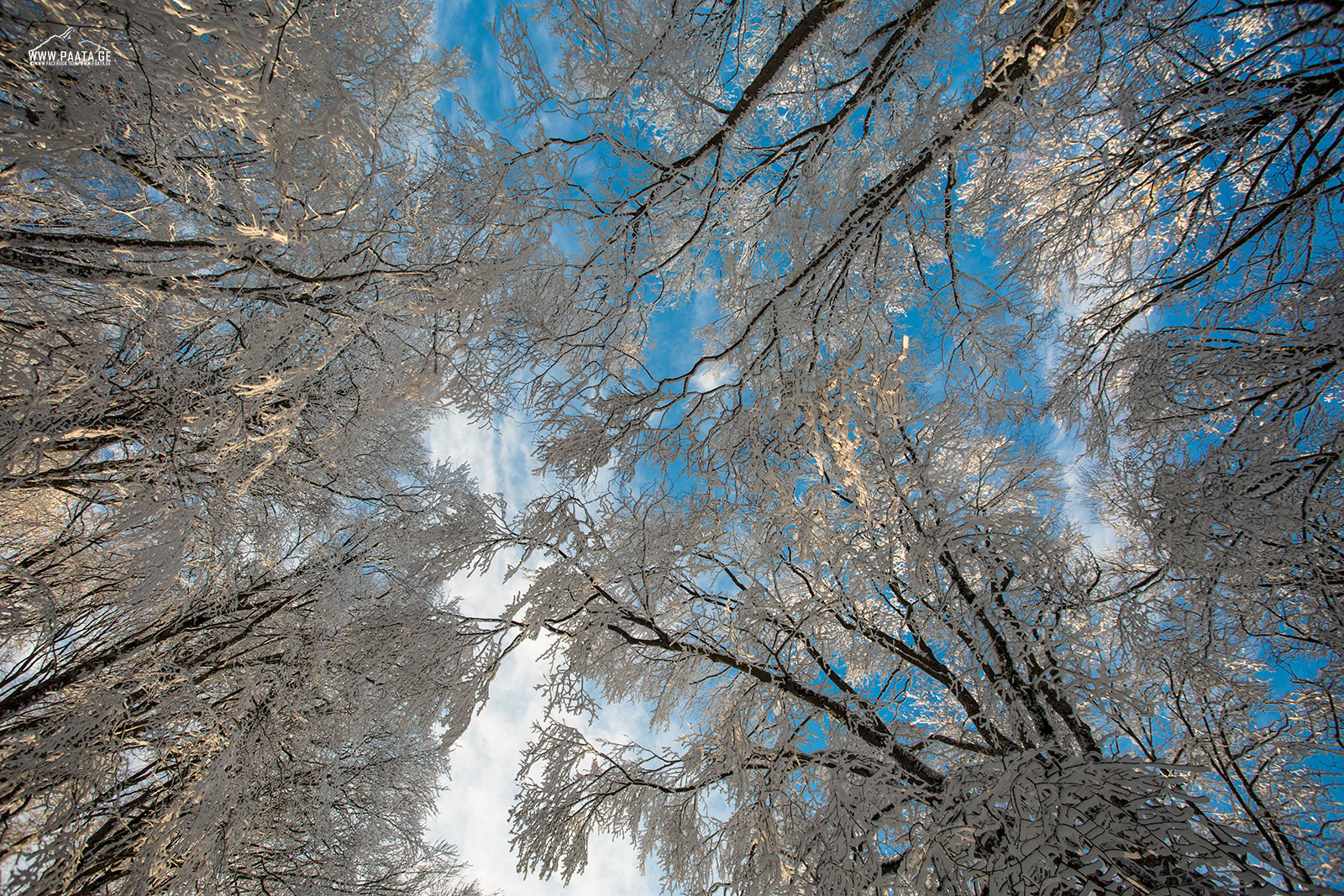

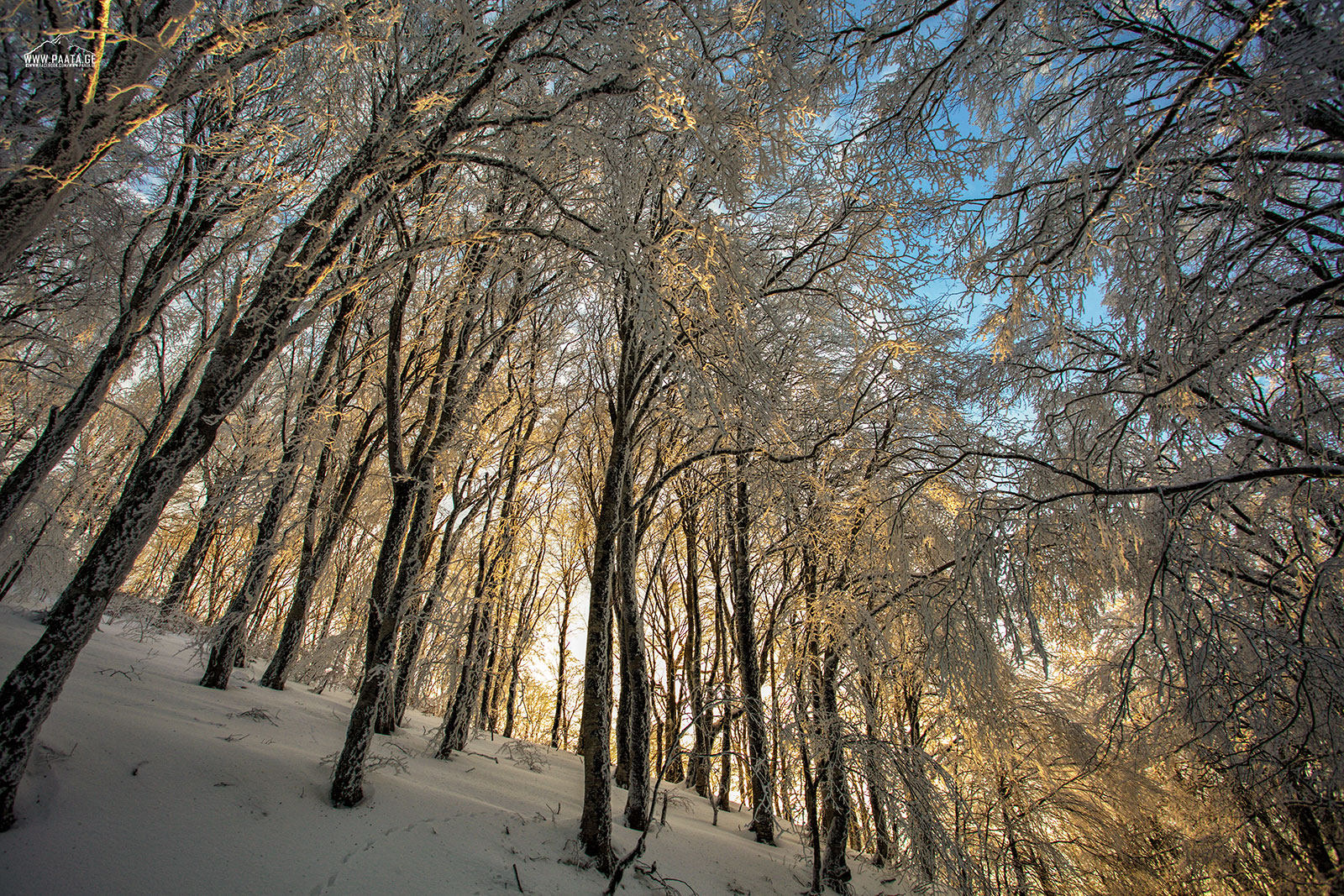

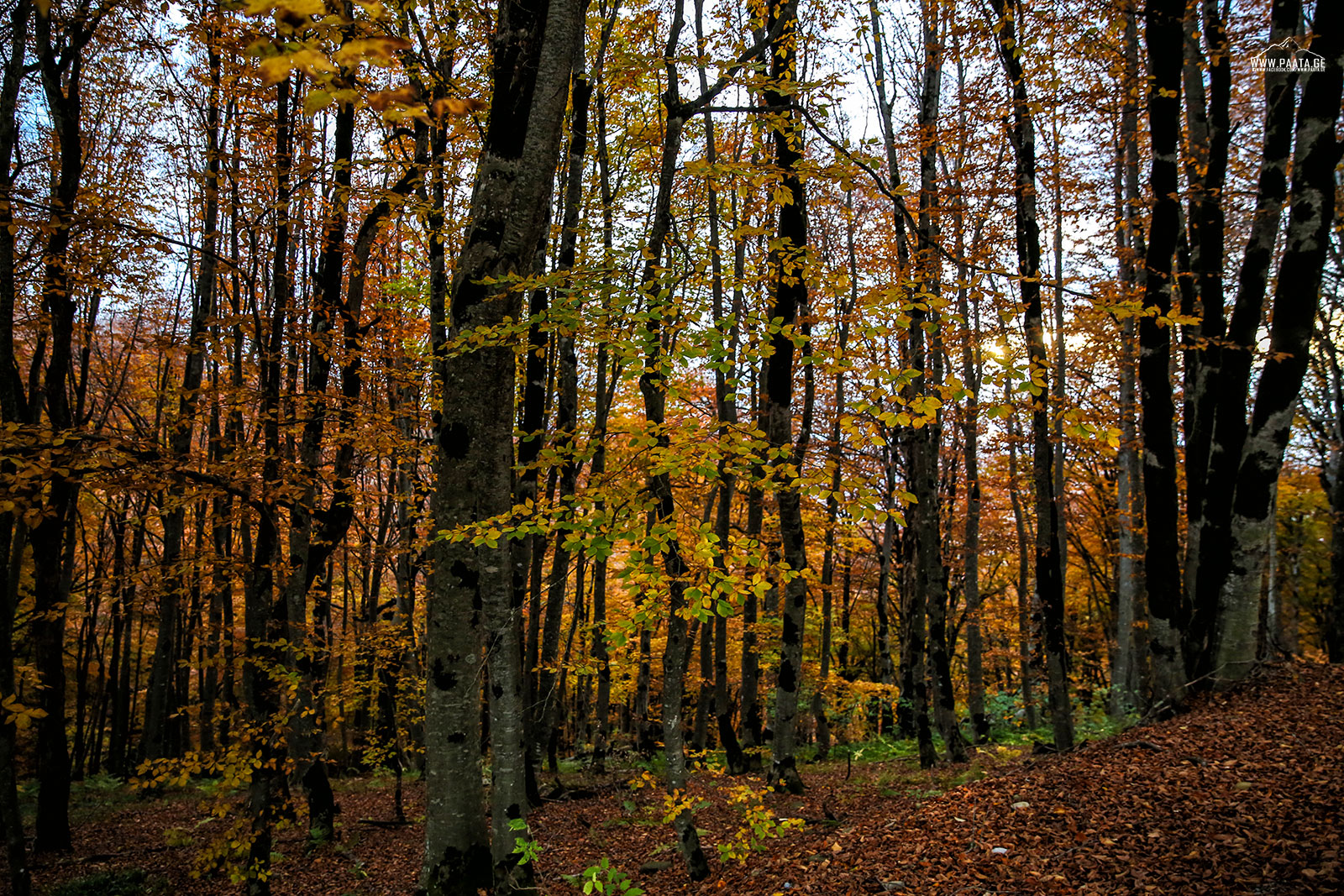

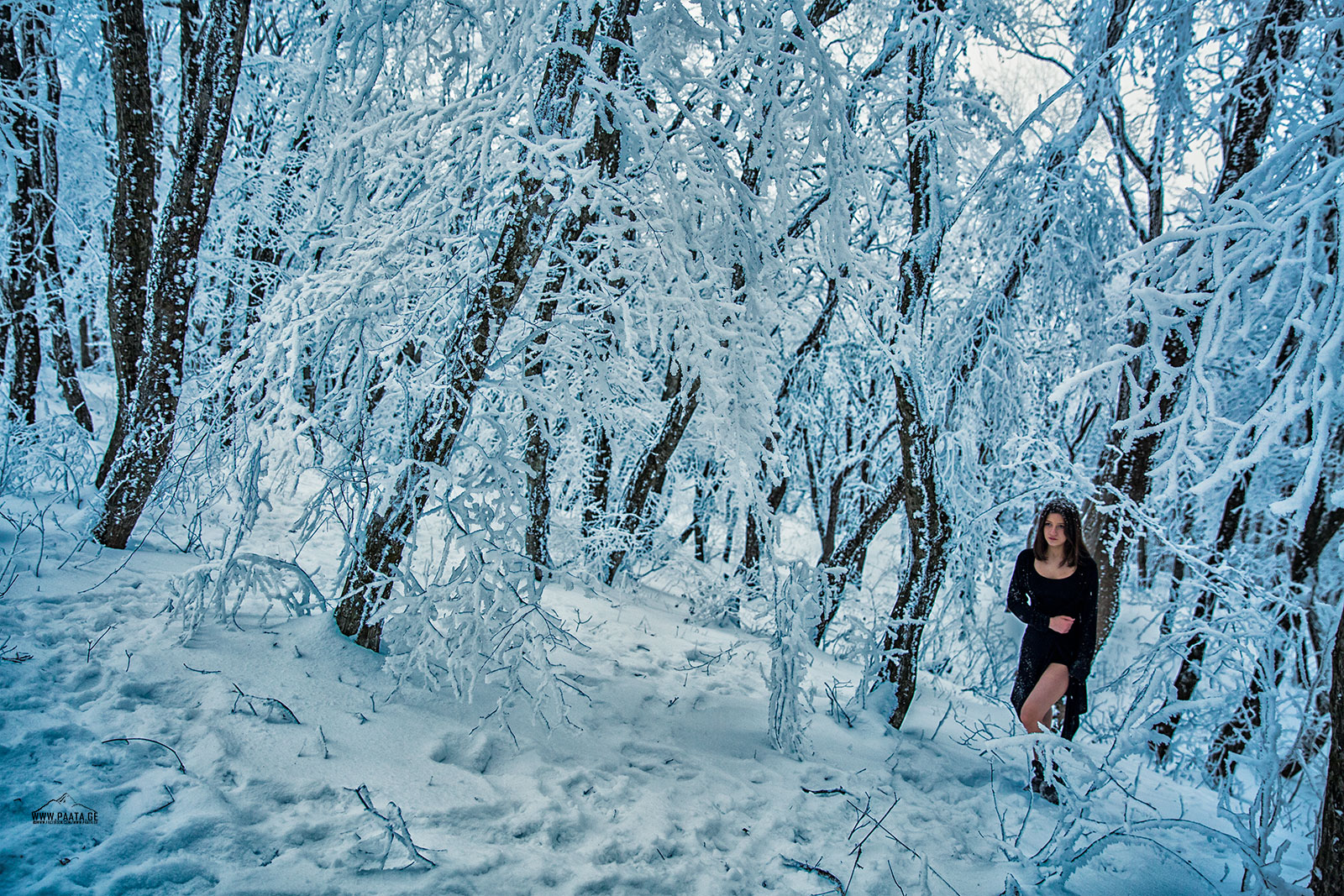

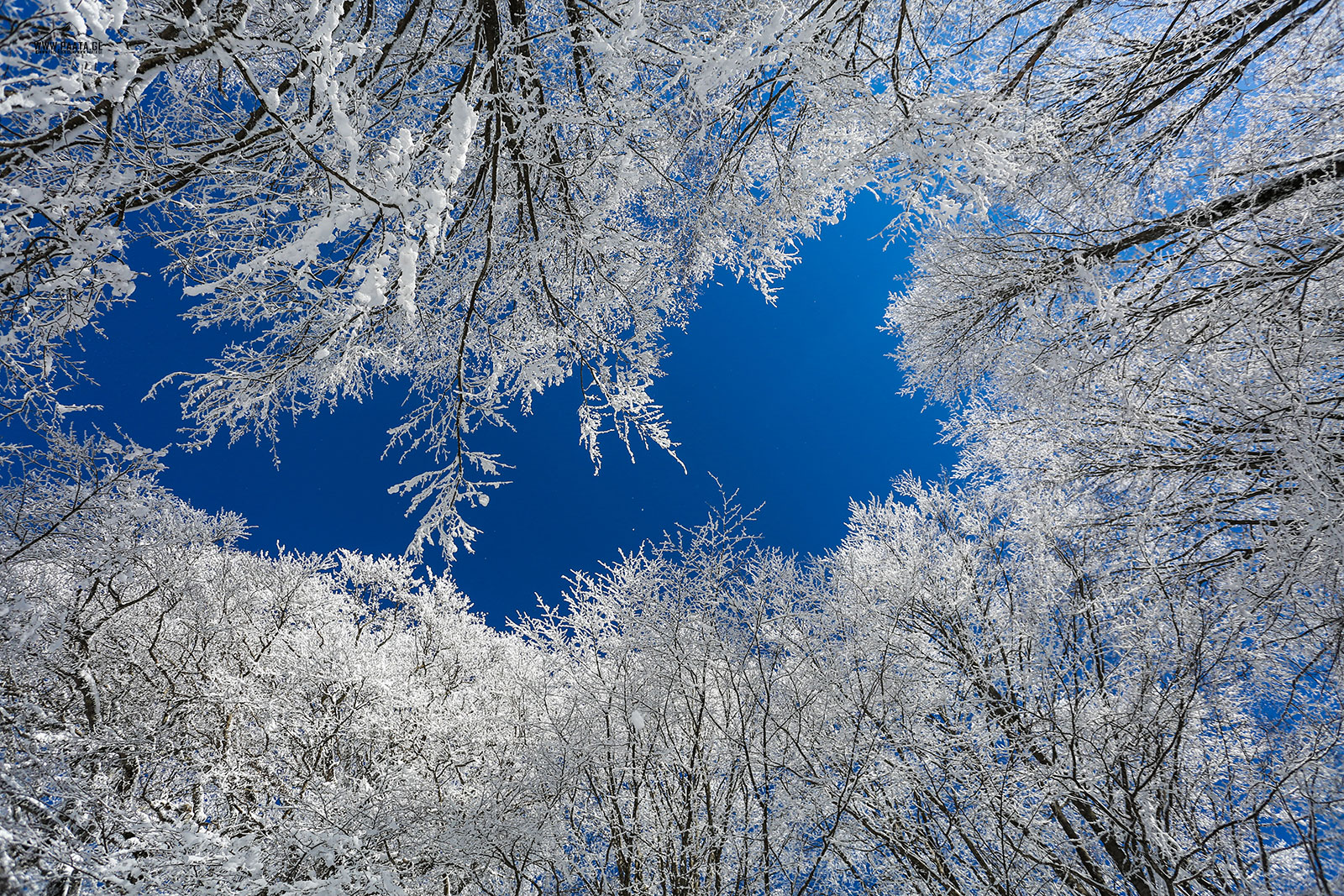

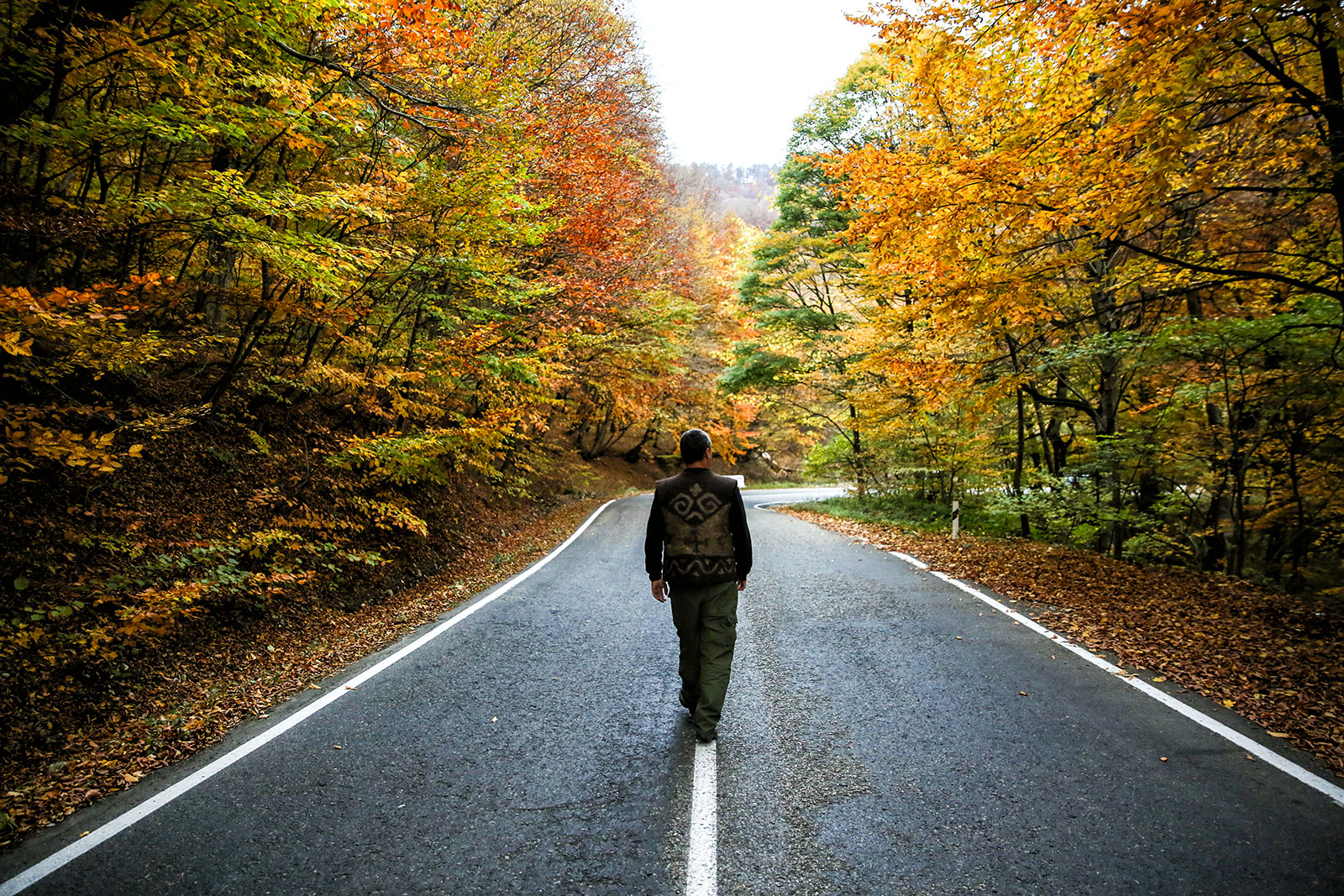

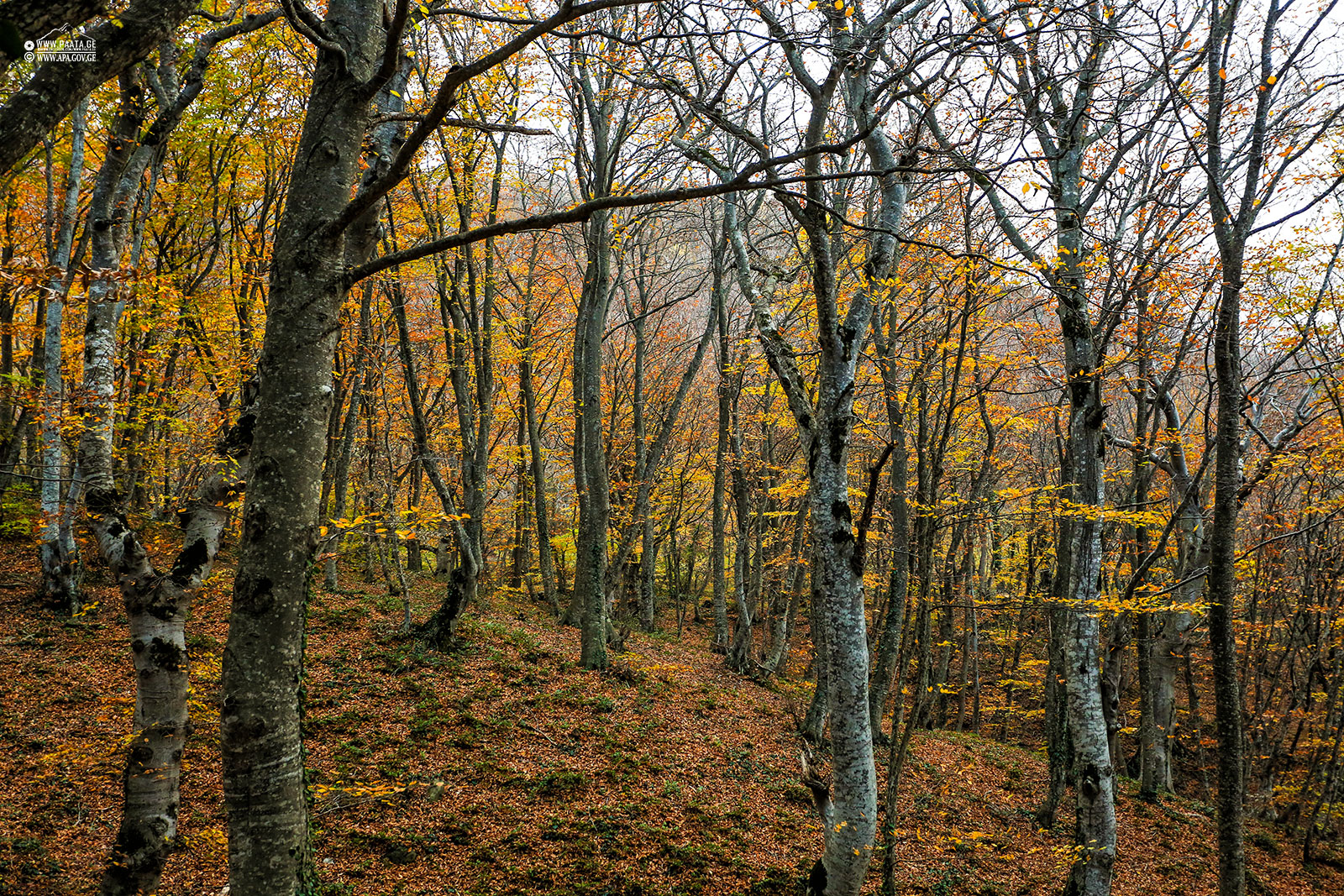

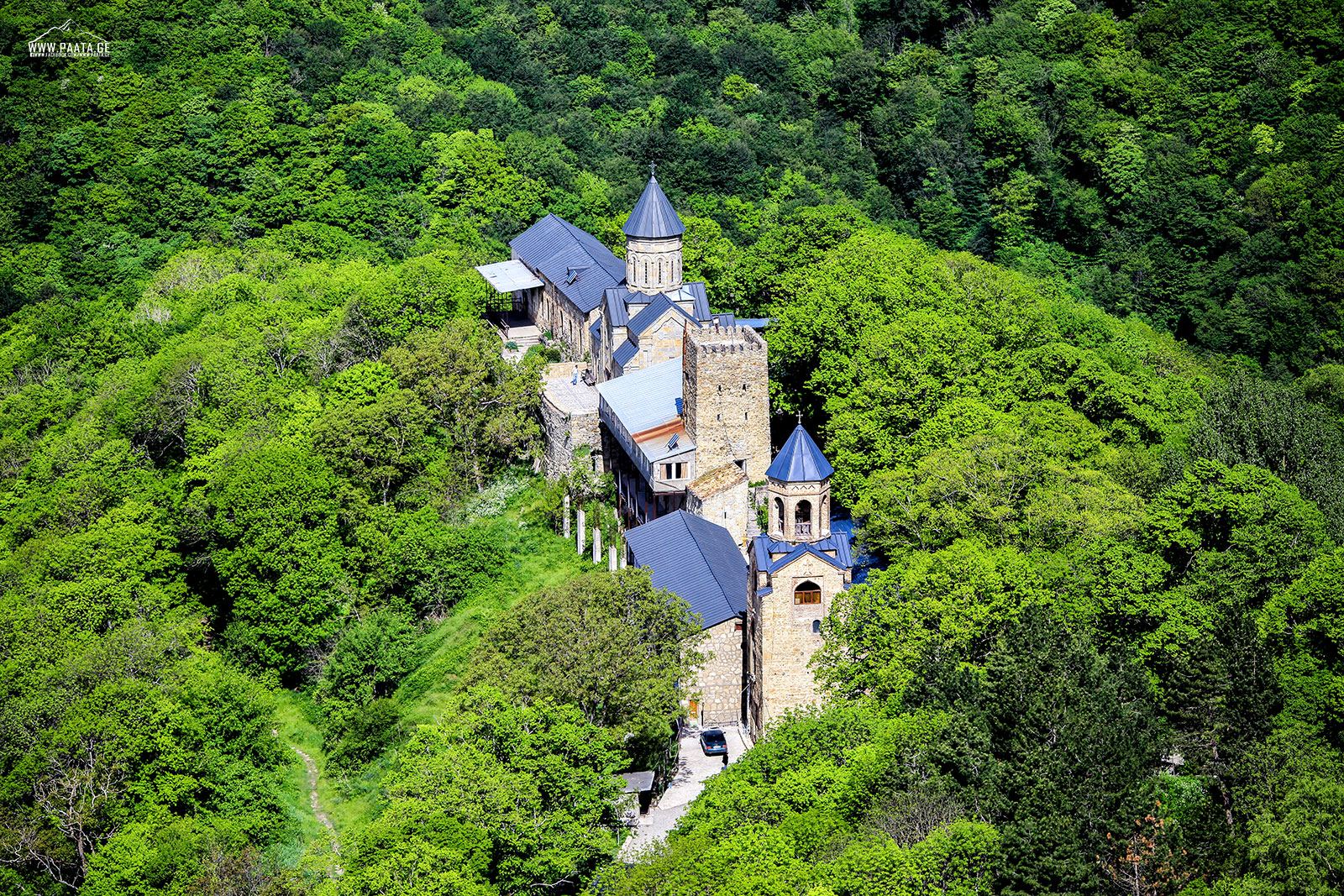

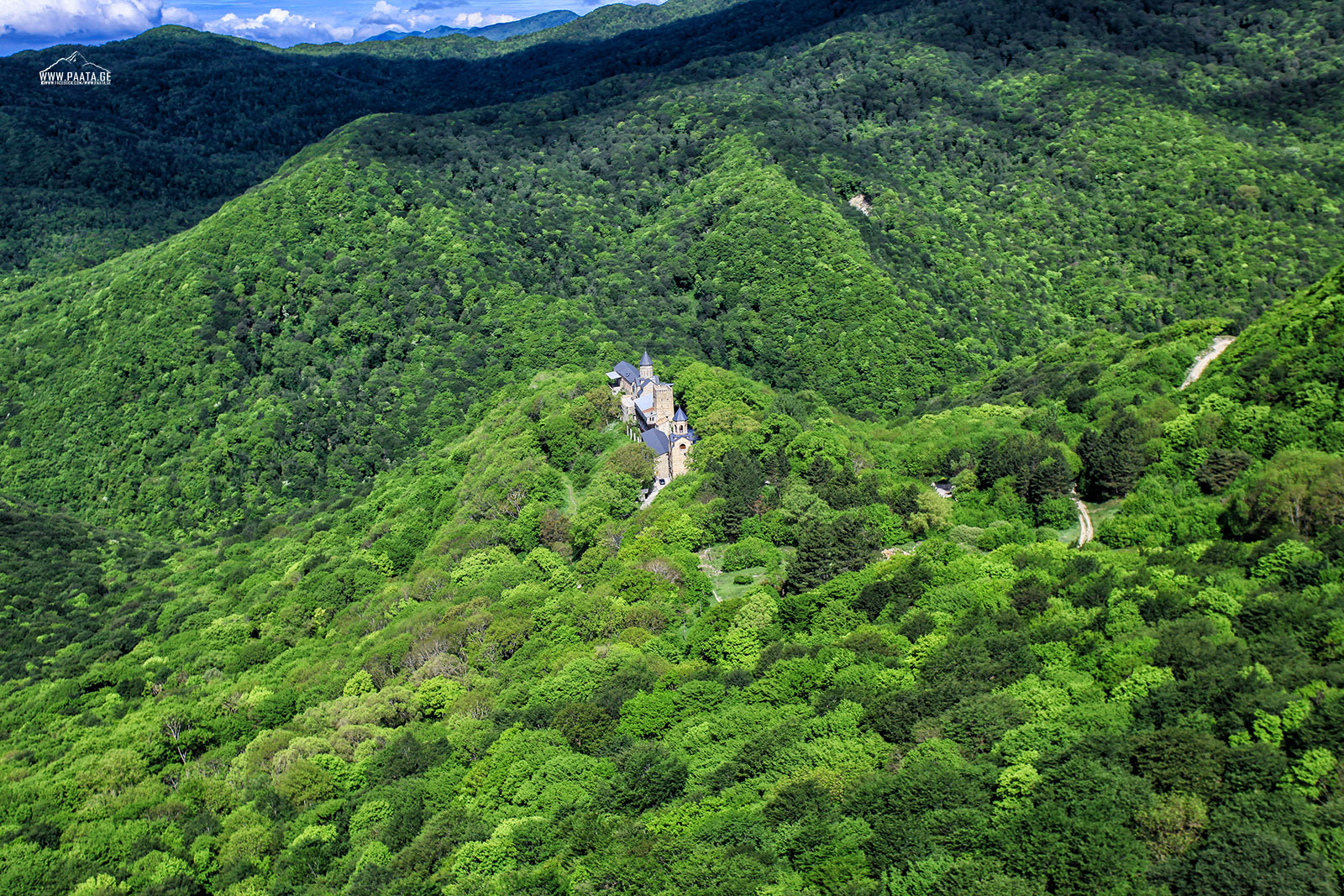

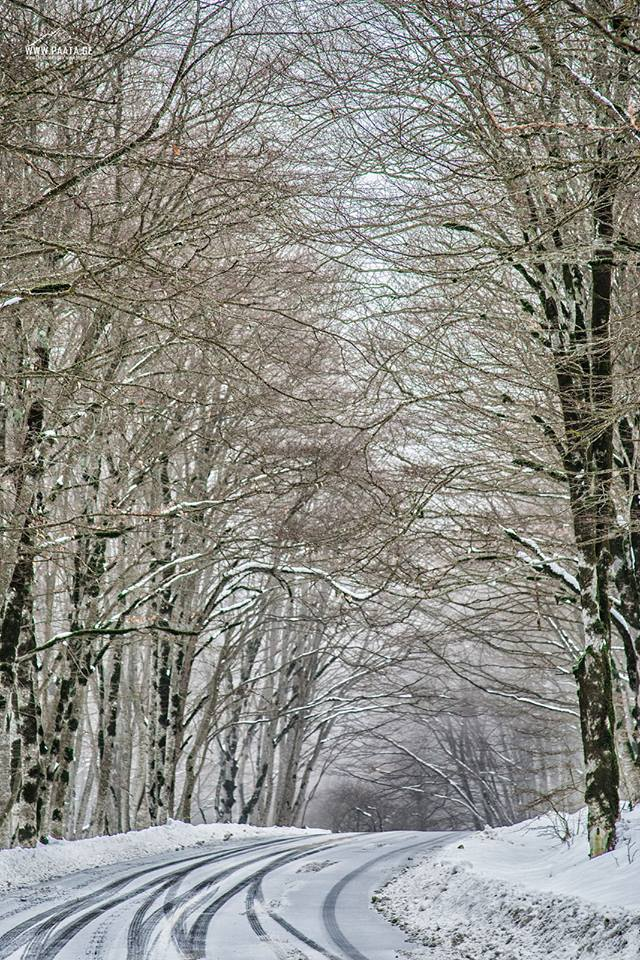
