= Avadhara =

Avadhara Georgian: ავადჰარა Abkhaz: Ауадҳара
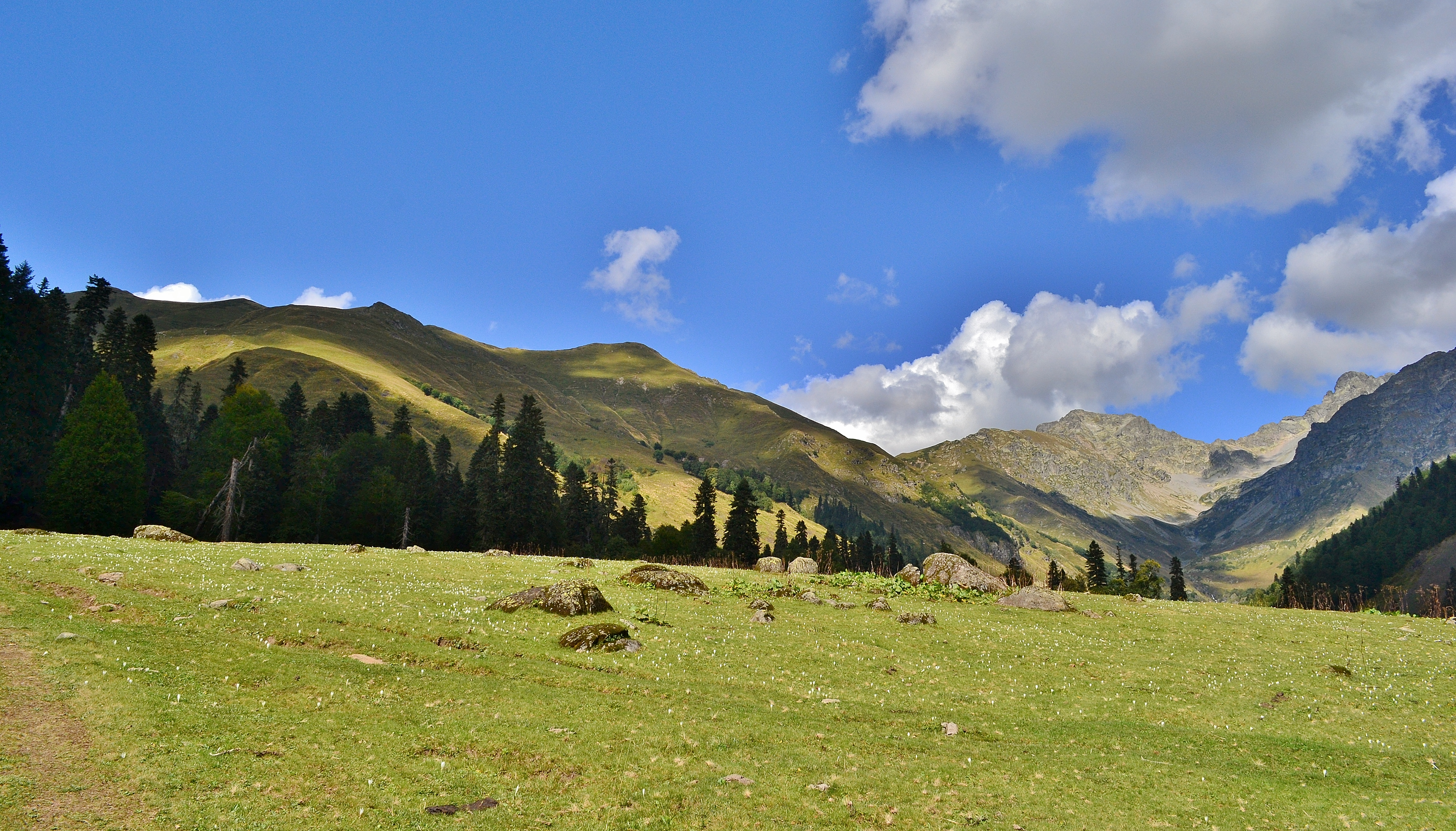
- View from village Avadhara toward North.

- Location within Georgia Location within Abkhazia
- Coordinates: 43°31′43″N 40°37′55″E
- Country: Georgia
- Partially recognized independent country: Abkhazia
- District: Gudauta
- Time zone: UTC+3 (MSK)
  - Summer (DST): UTC+4

Avadhara (sometimes referred to as Auadhara; Georgian: ავადჰარა; Abkhaz: Ауадҳара, Awadhara) is a climatological resort in Abkhazia, Georgia. The resort lies on the southwestern slopes of the Avadhara Range at an elevation of 1,600 meters (5,200 feet) above sea level. Mount Avadhara elevation 2,960 meters (9,710 feet). Avadhara is surrounded by fir, spruce, and beech forests. The area experiences cool summers and relatively cold winters.

== See also ==
- Lake Ritsa
- Mamison Pass
- Avadhara River
