= Lake Ritsa =

Lake in Abkhazia

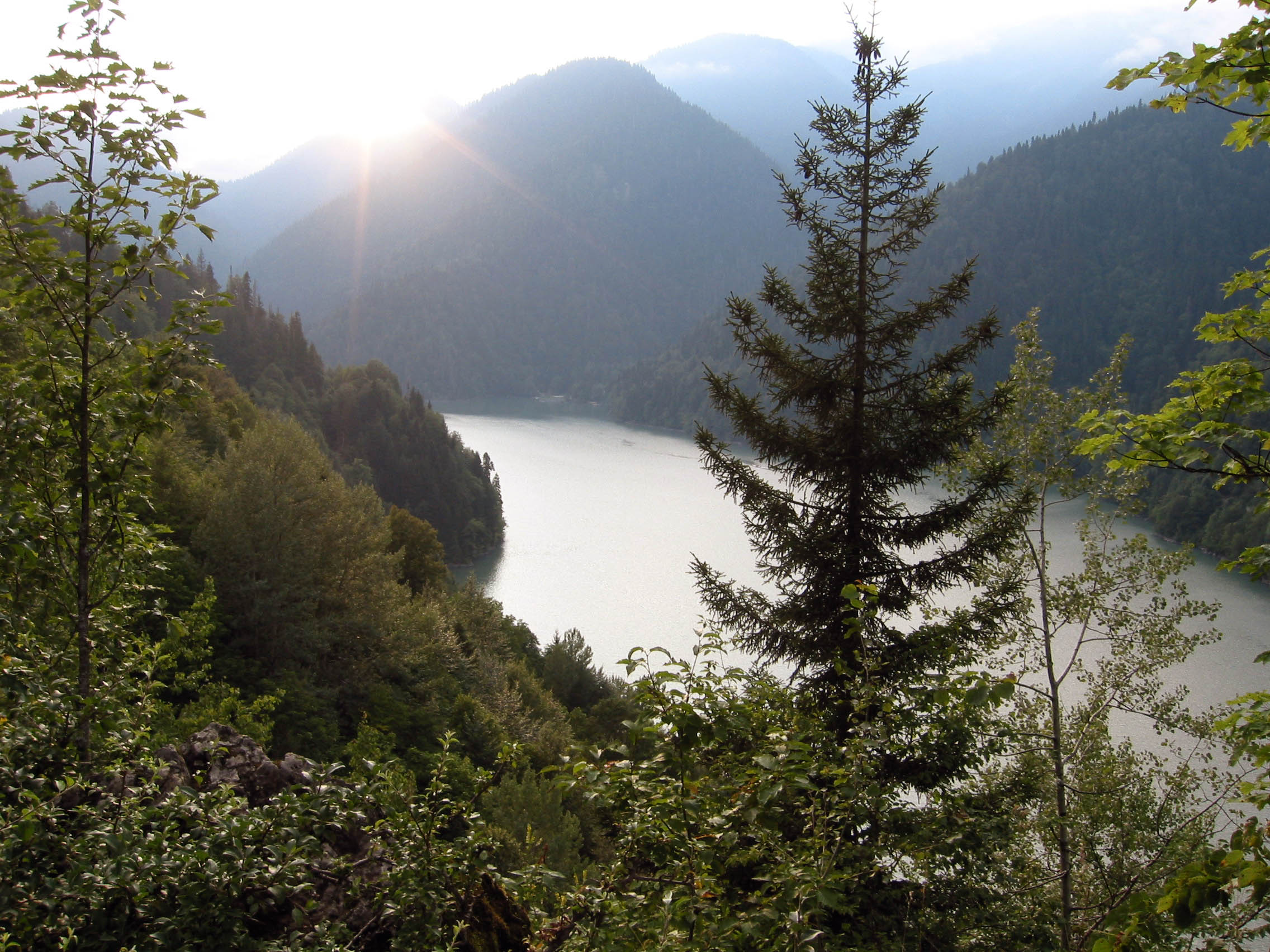
- Ritsa Lake

- Location within Abkhazia Location within Georgia
- Interactive map of Lake Ritsa
- Location: Abkhazia (de facto) Georgia (de jure)
- Coordinates: 43°29′N 40°33′E
- Primary inflows: Lashipsa River
- Primary outflows: Iupshara River
- Basin countries: Georgia
- Surface area: 1.49 km^{2} (0.58 sq mi)
- Max. depth: 116 m (381 ft)
- Shore length^{1}: 4.29 km (2.67 mi)
- Surface elevation: 950 m (3,120 ft)
- Islands: 0
- Settlements: Avadhara
- ^{1} Shore length is not a well-defined measure.

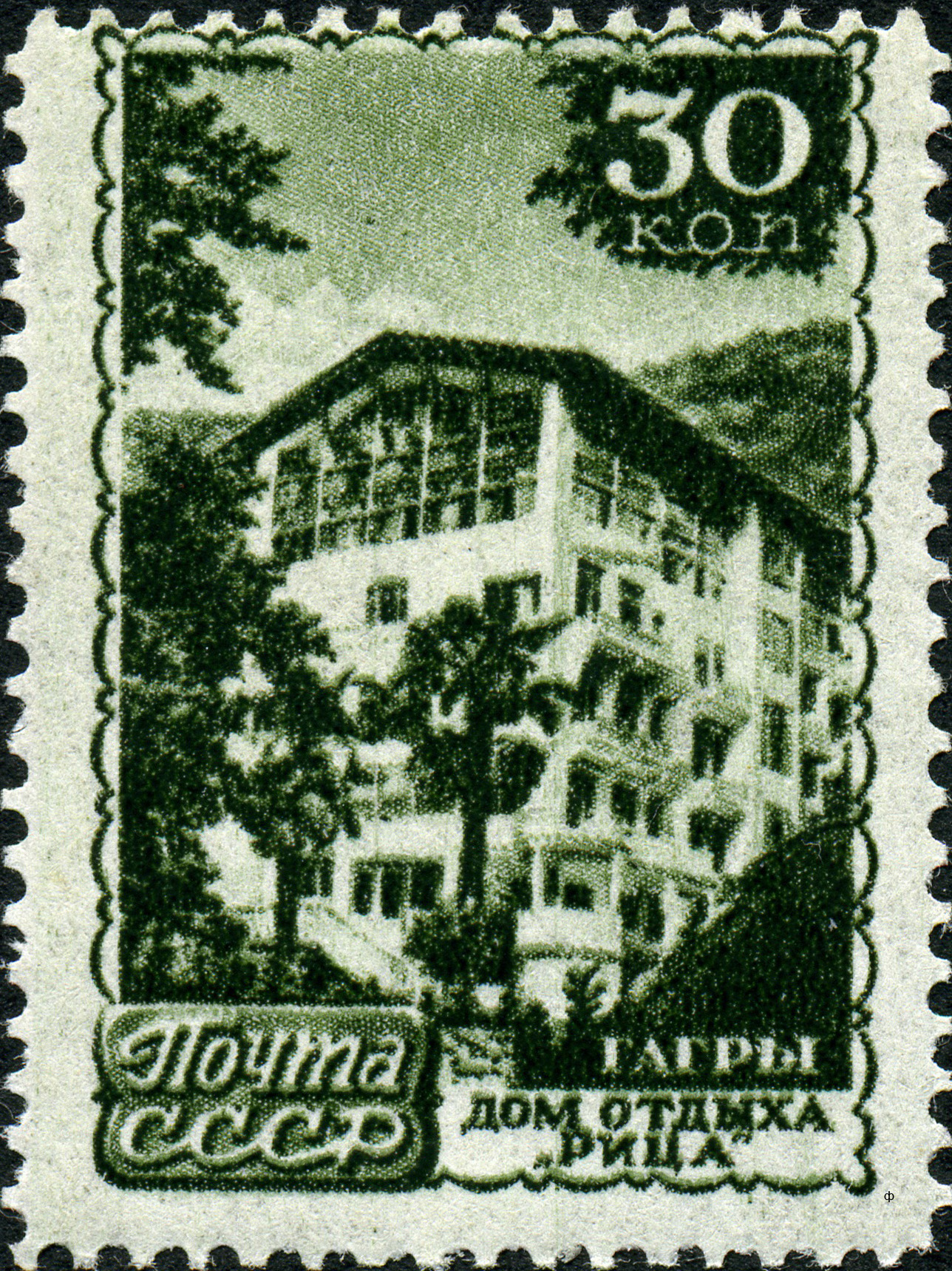
1947 Soviet stamp depicting resort buildings at Lake Ritsa

Lake Ritsa (Georgian: რიწა, romanized: rits'a; Abkhaz: Риҵа) is a lake in the north-western part of Abkhazia, in the Caucasus Mountains. It is surrounded by mixed mountain forests and subalpine meadows. The road from the Black Sea coast was built in 1936. The resort of Avadhara lies to the north of the lake. The lake was an important tourist attraction during the Soviet period. While the collapse of the Soviet Union and the Russia-Georgian war destroyed much of the tourism industry in the country, the lake is still frequently visited by Russian tourists.

== Geography ==
Lake Ritsa is the deepest lake in Abkhazia (116 m), and is rich in trout. It is fed by six rivers and drained by one, the Iupshara River.

== Environment ==
Lake Ritsa's water is cold and clear. Mountains with heights of 2,200 to 3,500 m surround the lake. The region around Lake Ritsa is a part of the Euxine-Colchic deciduous forests ecoregion with a fairly high concentration of evergreen boxwood groves. Many specimens of the Nordmann Fir, which reach heights of over 70 metres (230 ft), are found around the lake.

In 1930 the Ritsa Nature Reserve (162.89 km^{2}) was established to protect the natural state of the lake and the surrounding land.

== Notable residents ==
The Soviet leader Joseph Stalin had one of his summer-houses (dacha) by the lake. Later Leonid Brezhnev had his summer house nearby as well. Today the dacha belongs to the Government of Abkhazia.

== Climate ==
The average annual temperature in the area is 7.8 degrees Celsius (January −1.1 °C, August 17.8 °C). The mean annual precipitation is approx. 2,000–2,200 mm. Winters are sometimes snowy, summers warm.

== Legends and stories of Ritsa ==
There are many legends and fairy tales about the lake.

=== Origin ===
In ancient times there was a valley and a river at the site of the modern lake. A girl named Ritsa lived there with three brothers Agepsta, Atsetuka and Pshegishkha. Ritsa used to pasture her animals in the valley and her brothers hunted in the high mountains by day and returned to the valley in the evening, where they ate, sang songs, and admired their sister.

Once the brothers went too far into the mountains. Ritsa missed them and sang. The forest robbers Gega and Iupshara heard her and decided to kidnap her. Iupshara caught her and rode down the valley, while Gega covered his flank. Ritsa's brothers heard her crying and came to the rescue.

Pshegishkha threw a sword at the robbers, but he missed and the sword flew over the river. The valley was filled with water and turned into a lake. Ritsa broke from Iupshara's grip, but fell into the lake. The brothers couldn't save her. Then Pshegishkha threw the robber Iupshara into the lake, but Ritsa's water wouldn't accept him and threw out him over Pshegishkha's sword and the water carried him away to the sea. Gega ran after Iupshara, but he didn't manage to rescue him.

Out of grief, the brothers turned into mountains, and today they are still standing here to protect the resting-place of Ritsa.

=== Goodbye, Motherland! ===
Several myths have risen up about origin of the name "Goodbye Motherland!" given to cliff and observation deck on the road to Lake Ritsa. It appears the name was coined by tourist guides, as the area's real name is "Chabgar Cornice." One story goes that in the 1930s, during the construction of Stalins's dacha, soldiers had to transport building materials along the precarious, narrow mountain road. During one of these trips, in one of the most precarious spots, a truck fell from the edge. As the truck was falling, the driver cried: "Goodbye, Motherland!" ("Прощай, Родина!"). Another legend says a truck with captured Germans fell into the abyss. Some of the Germans, who had fallen in love with Abkhazia as a native country, shouted: "Farewell, Motherland!" Yet another says there were not prisoners in the truck, but soldiers retreating along the road at night. On a narrow road, the driver lost control and the truck fell into an abyss.

== Gallery ==
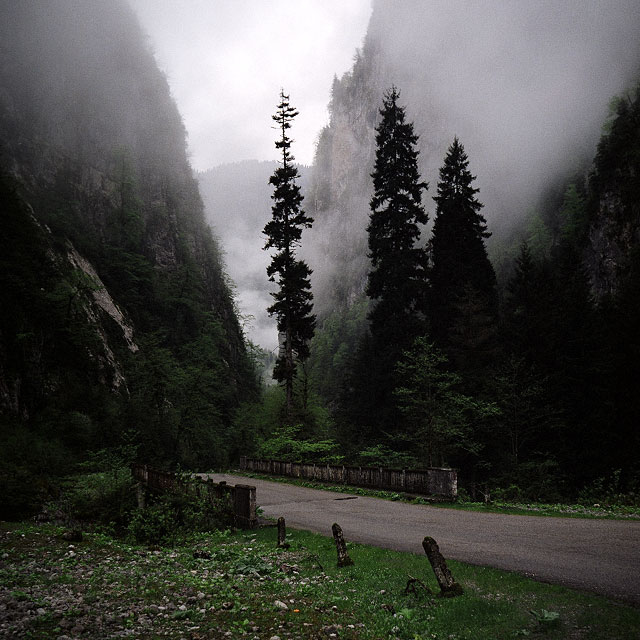
Road to lake Ritza

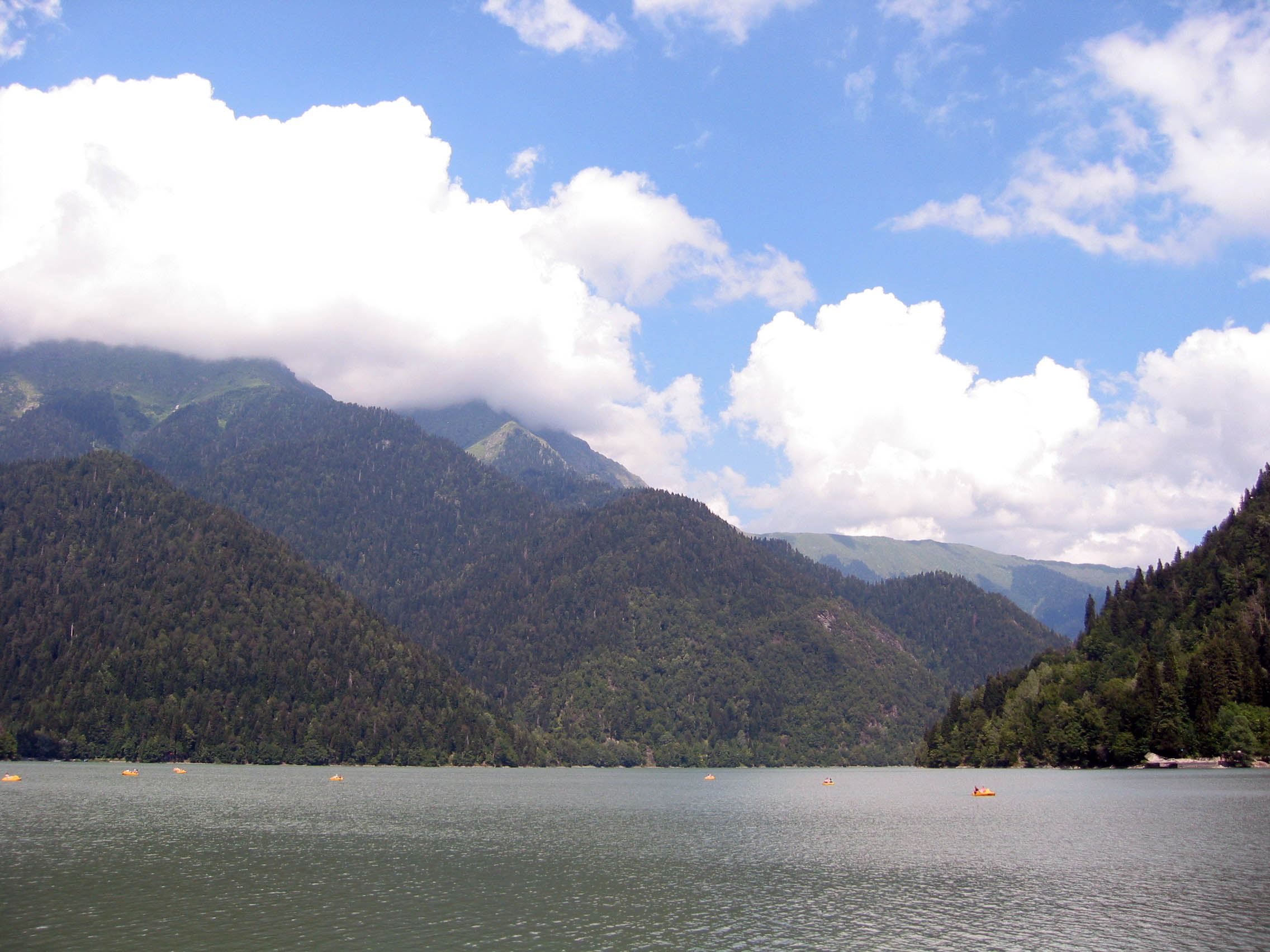
Tourists boating at Ritsa

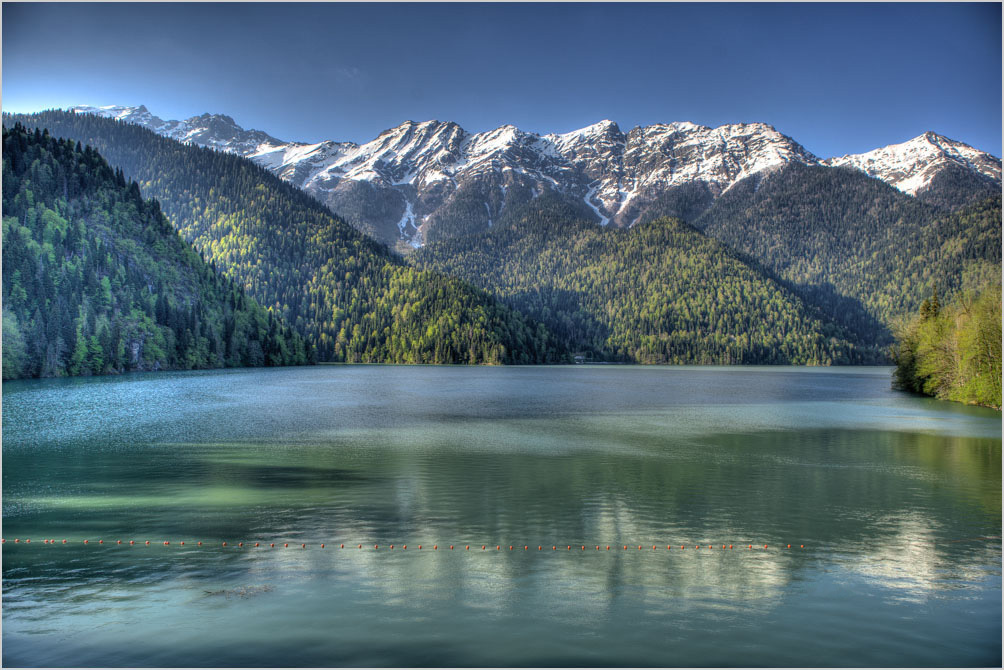
Ritsa Lake in 2013

== See also ==
- Lake Smaller Ritsa
- Ritsa Strict Nature Reserve
