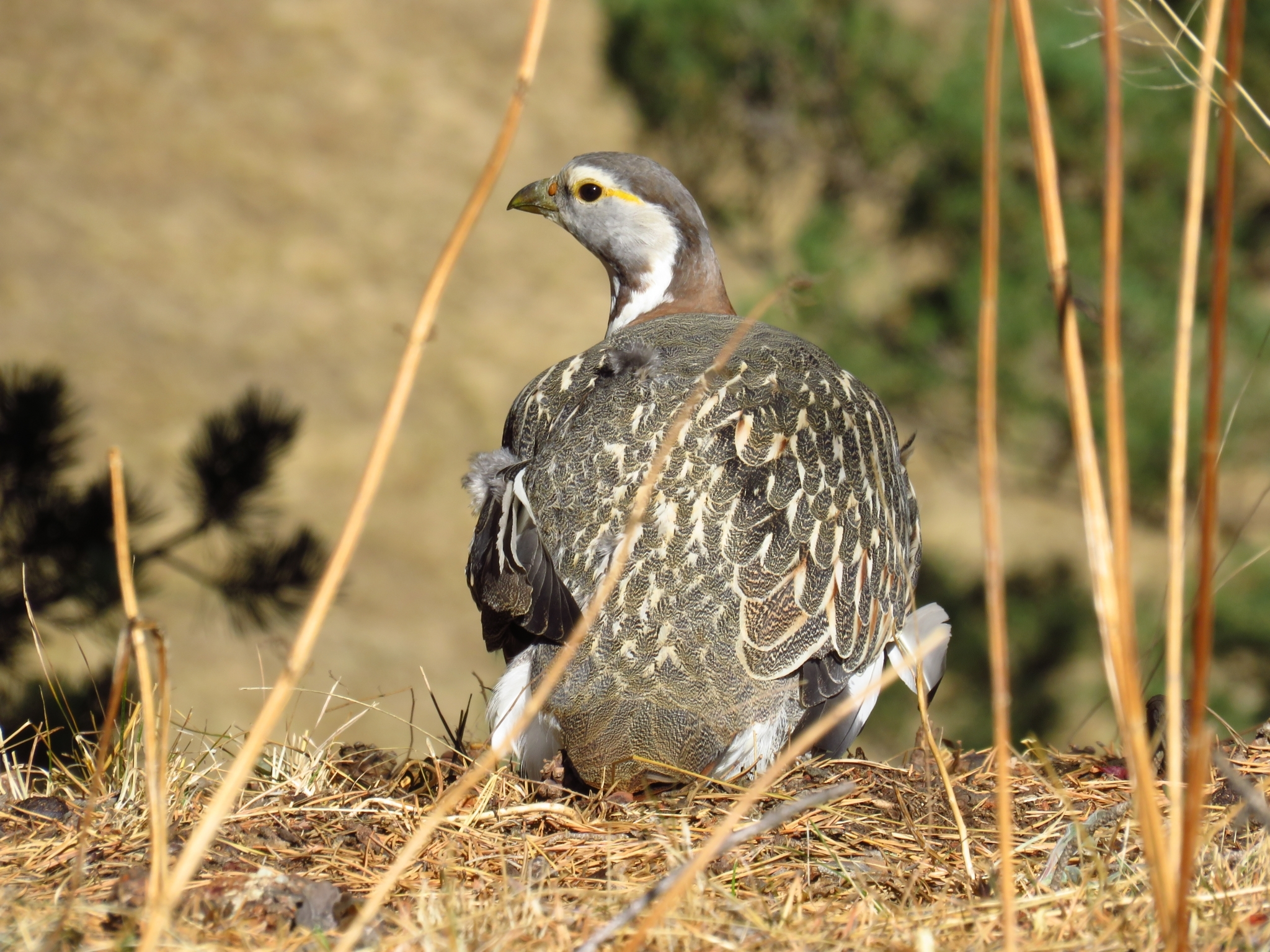

Conservation status
- Least Concern (IUCN 3.1)

Scientific classification
- Kingdom: Animalia
- Phylum: Chordata
- Class: Aves
- Order: Galliformes
- Family: Phasianidae
- Genus: Tetraogallus
- Species: T. caucasicus

Binomial name
- Tetraogallus caucasicus (Pallas, 1811)

= Caucasian snowcock =

Species of bird

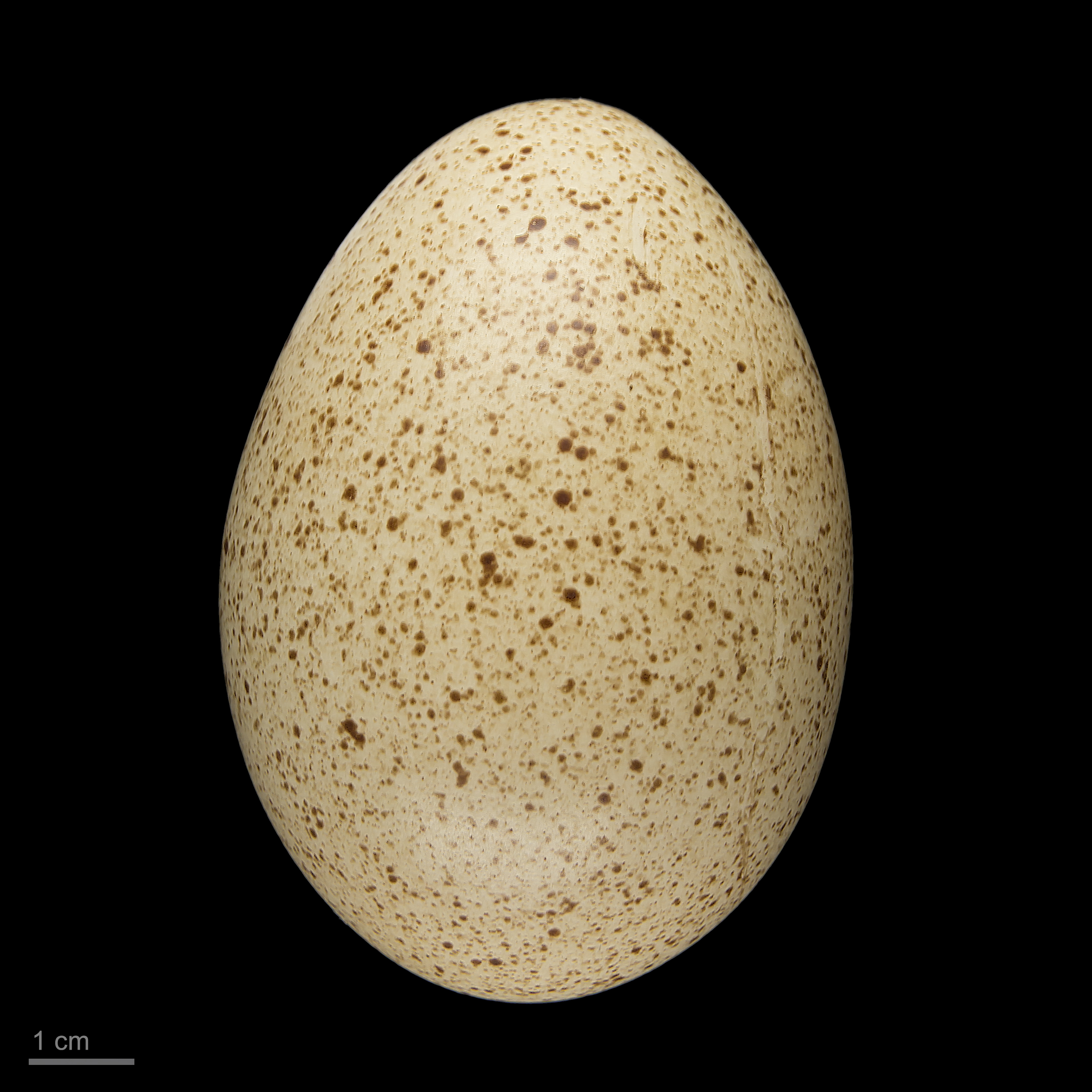
Tetraogallus caucasicus - MHNT

The Caucasian snowcock (Tetraogallus caucasicus) is a snowcock in the pheasant family Phasianidae of the order Galliformes, gallinaceous birds.

It is native to the Caucasus Mountains, particularly the Western Caucasus, where it breeds at altitudes from 2000 to 4000 m on bare stony mountains. It nests in a bare ground scrape and lays typically 5-6 greenish eggs, which are incubated only by the female. Its food is seeds and vegetable matter. It forms small flocks when not breeding.

== Description ==
This is a 50–60 cm (20–24 in) long bird. Its plumage is patterned with grey, brown, white and black, but this snowcock looks grey from any distance. The breast is darker and the flanks ruddier than the rest of the body. It has a white throat and a white patch on the side of the neck. The nape is rust-colored.

In flight, this wary bird shows white flight feathers and undertail, and reddish sides to the tail. Male and female plumages are similar, but the juvenile is slightly smaller and duller in appearance.

Caucasian snowcock has a desolate whistling song, vaguely like a Eurasian curlew, sooo-looo-leeee. The calls include loud cackles and bubbled buck-buck-buck-buck-burrrrrr.

== General Behavior ==
The bird's ability to move is limited due to its poor flight ability, where it's often only able to glide or drift down hills. The bird's main movement is using its legs, which permit it to bounce between the rocky slopes of the Caucasus mountains. This lack of strong flight patterns means the bird is unable to travel far distances from the mountains that the bird originates from, meaning the bird is only found in the Caucasian mountains.

=== Hunting Behavior ===
The Snowcock has a simple daily pattern due to its limited flight ability. The bird will coast down the mountain side in the early morning to feed and over the course of the day, will make their way back up the mountain side for their nocturnal resting sites.

== Diet ==
The Snowcock's diet mainly consists of different small shrubs and plant species, with invertebrates rarely if ever being eaten by the bird.

== Mating ==
The bird exhibits strong social bonds, behaving as very strong and intact family units. The Caucasian Snowcock breeds in the high elevation of the Caucasian mountains. During the spring and summer seasons, the bird will adopt high altitude nesting areas and then move down the mountain to warm climates as the winter sets in. During the mating period, males will lose their social preference. The male snowcock exhibits strong monogamous behavior, picking only one mate during the mating season. This monogamous attitude also leads to aggression between males as they compete for mates in their flocks. Mating pairs will set up nests between the 2600 and 3500 meters elevation during mating season, which for the Snowcock is between February and April.

== Conservation status ==
This small range of habitat is generally protected by local governments. The bird is considered non threatened according to the IUCN Red list criteria and because of this, very little is done to protect the bird. However poaching and hunting surrounding the bird is poorly studied.
