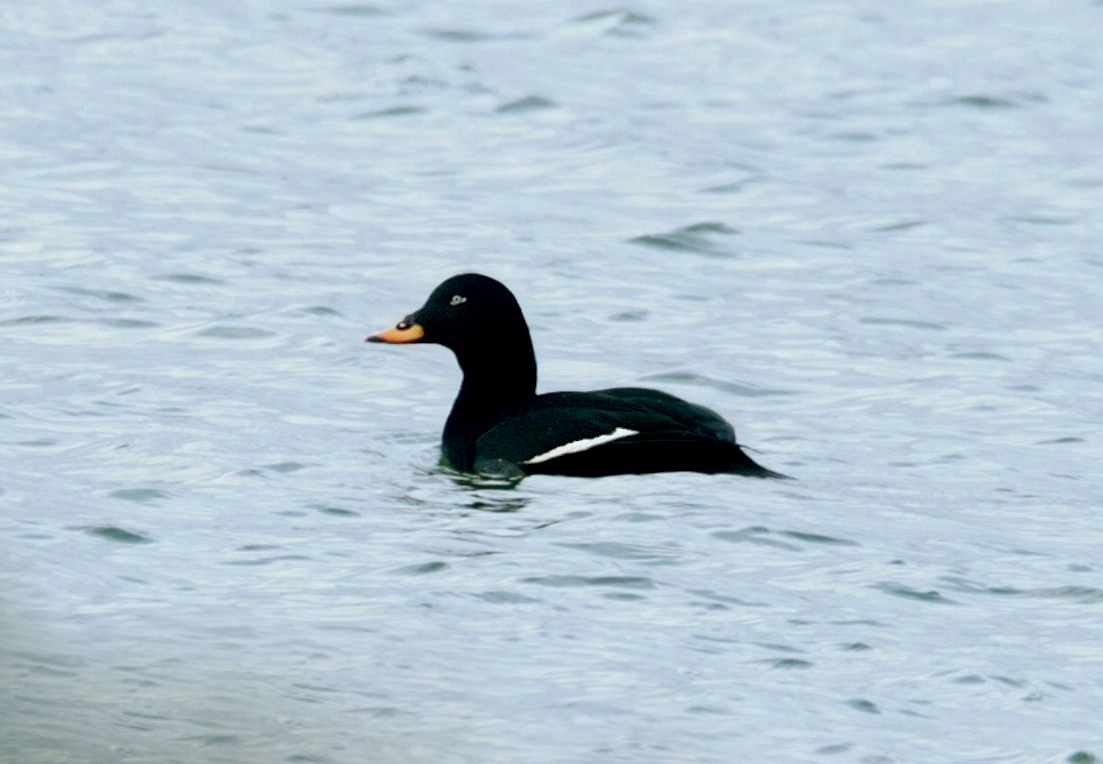
- Male
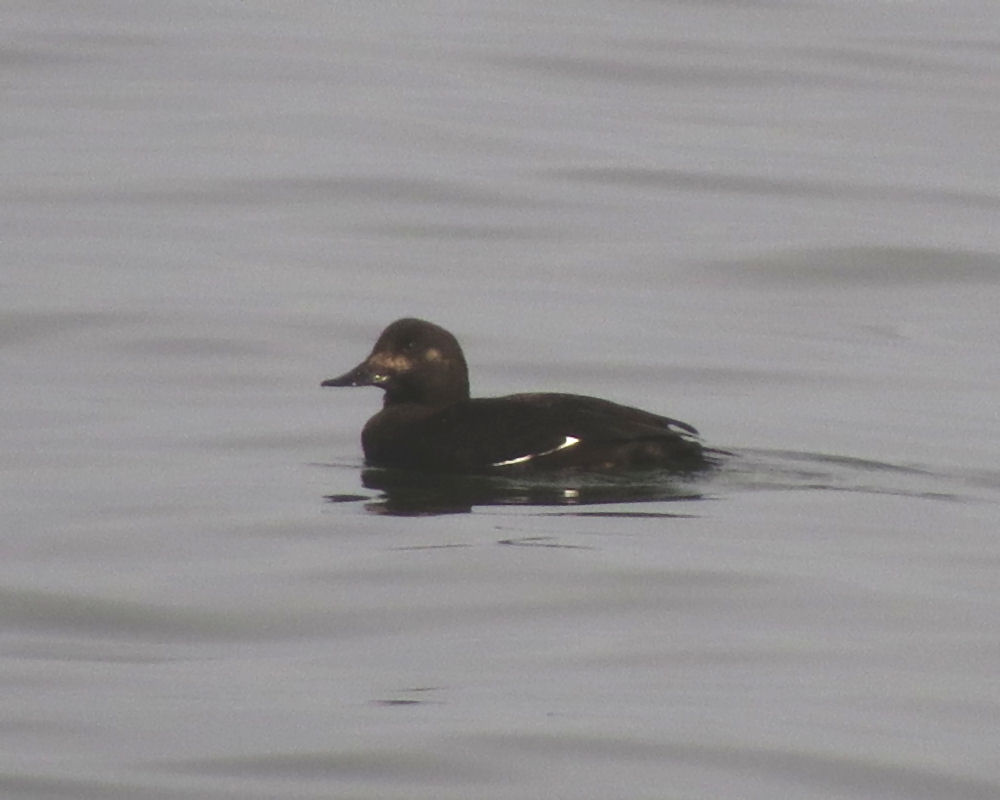
- Female

Conservation status
- Vulnerable (IUCN 3.1)

Scientific classification
- Kingdom: Animalia
- Phylum: Chordata
- Class: Aves
- Order: Anseriformes
- Family: Anatidae
- Genus: Melanitta
- Subgenus: Melanitta
- Species: M. fusca

Binomial name
- Melanitta fusca (Linnaeus, 1758)
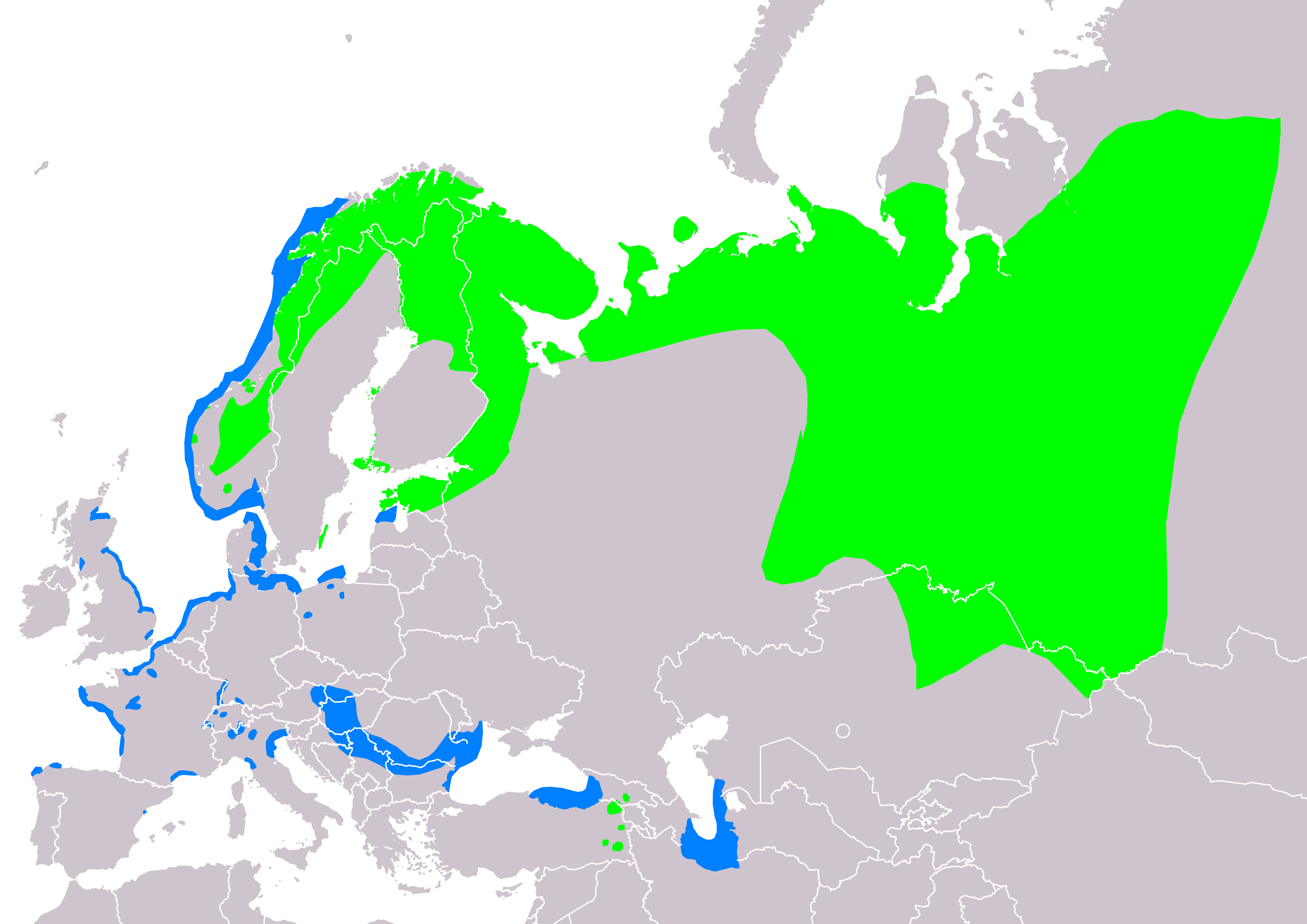
- Range of M. fusca Breeding Non-breeding

Synonyms
- Anas fusca Linnaeus, 1758

= Velvet scoter =

Species of bird

The velvet scoter (Melanitta fusca) is a large sea duck, which breeds over the far north of Europe and the Palearctic west of the Yenisey basin. The genus name is derived from Ancient Greek melas "black" and netta "duck". The species name is from the Latin fuscus "dusky brown".

== Taxonomy ==
The velvet scoter was formally described in 1758 by the Swedish naturalist Carl Linnaeus in the tenth edition of his Systema Naturae under the binomial name Anas fusca. Linnaeus specified the type locality as European seas but restricted this to the Swedish coast in 1761. The velvet scoter is now one of six species placed in the genus Melanitta that was introduced in 1822 by the German zoologist Friedrich Boie. The genus name combines the Ancient Greek melas meaning "black" and netta meaning "duck". The specific epithet fusca is from Latin fuscus meaning "dusky", "black" or "brown". The species is considered to be monotypic: no subspecies are recognised.

The velvet scooter was formerly considered to be conspecific with the white-winged scoter (Melanitta deglandi) of North America and Stejneger's scoter (Melanitta stejnegeri) of eastern Siberia and northwest Mongolia.

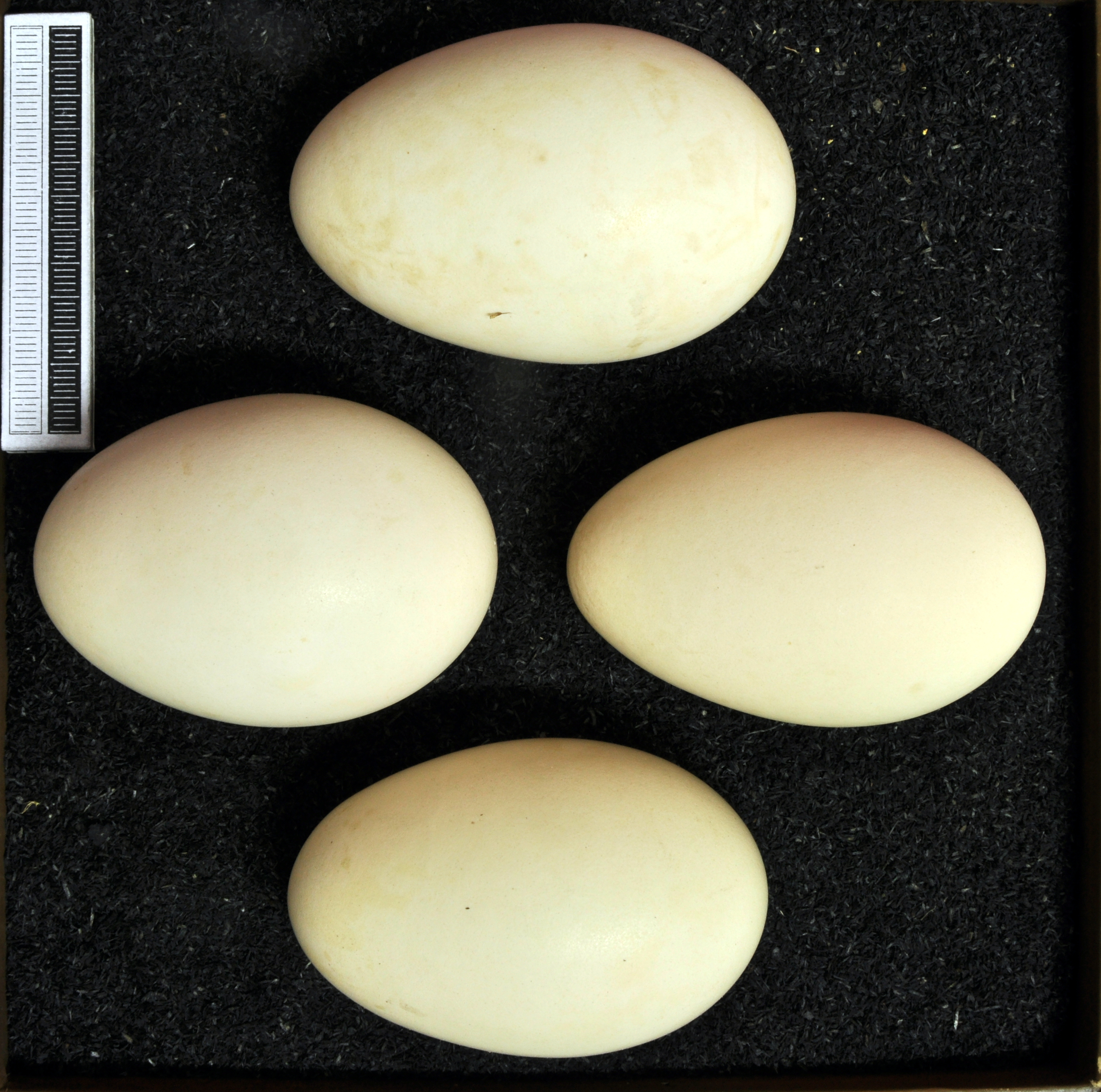
Eggs, Collection Museum Wiesbaden

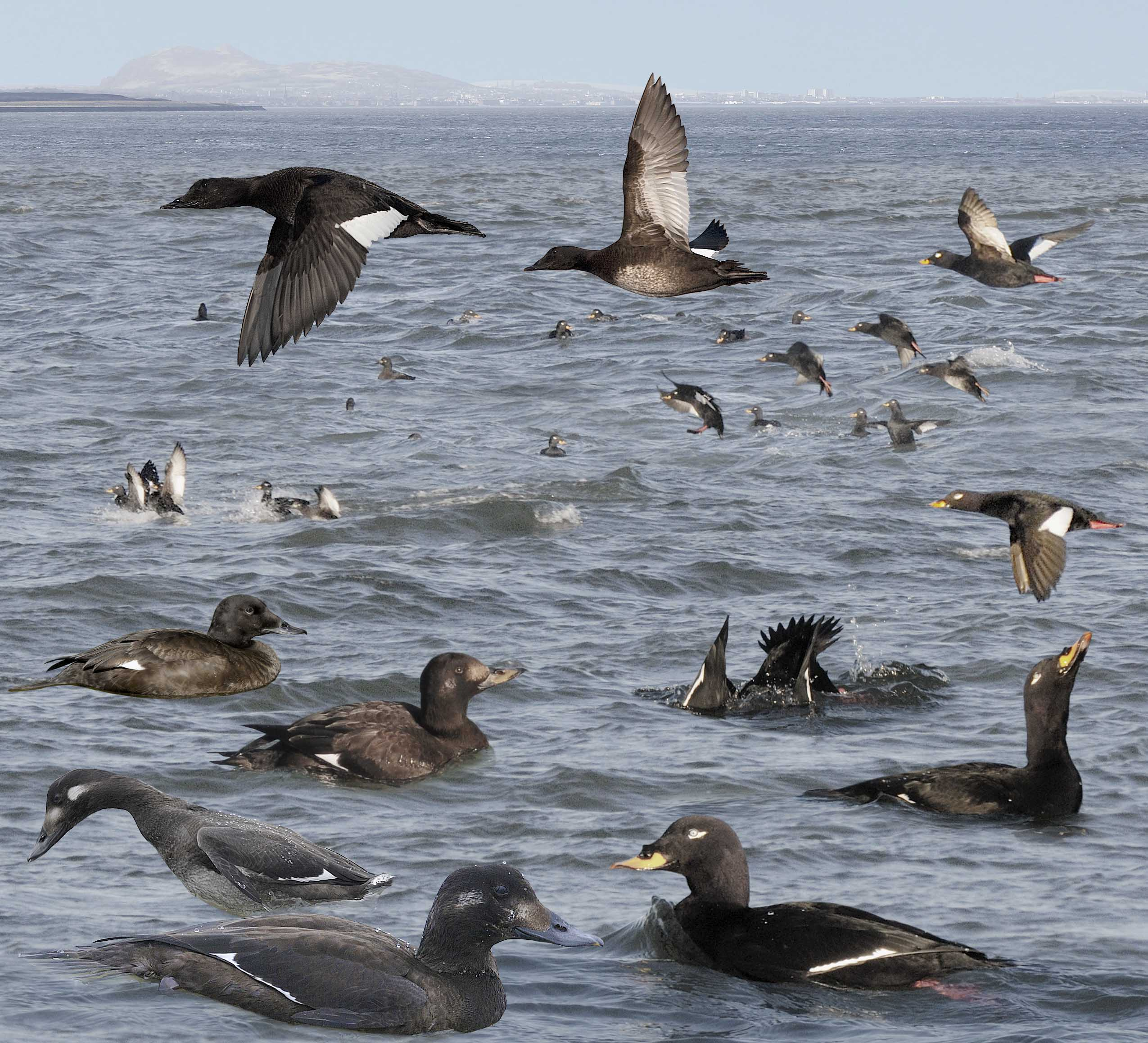
Composite image of velvet scoter

== Description ==
The velvet scoter is 51–56 cm (20–22 in) in length and has a wingspan of 90–99 cm (35–39 in). It is a relatively large sea duck with a thick neck, a long broad bill and a pointed tail. The plumage of the male is glossy black with large white wing patches and small white patches behind the eye. The bill is partly orange. The female is similar to the male but lacks the gloss on the feathers and is duller and browner.

== Distribution ==
They breed in northern Europe, from Norway to the Yenisey River in central Siberia and also northeast Kazakhstan. It winters farther south in temperate zones, Europe as far south as Great Britain, and on the Black and Caspian Sea. Small numbers reach France and northern Spain. It forms large flocks on suitable coastal waters. These are tightly packed, and the birds tend to take off together.

Lake Tabatskuri in the region of Samtskhe–Javakheti, Georgia, holds the last breeding population of velvet scoters in the Caucasus. Studies into this population in 2017–2018 found 25–35 pairs at the lake, with substantially fewer nesting. Telemetry studies revealed this population winters in the Black Sea, particularly the Samsun Bay in Turkey. Competition for nesting locations, predation on velvet scoters by gulls, and disturbance by fishing activities were identified as contributing factors to reproductivity rates that were considered as "poor".

== Behaviour ==
=== Breeding ===
The lined nest is built on the ground close to the sea, lakes or rivers, in woodland or tundra. The nest is built by the female and is placed in thick vegetation and is well concealed. The clutch is typically 7–9 creamy white eggs which measure 72 mm × 48 mm (2.8 in × 1.9 in). Beginning after the last egg is laid, they are incubated for 27–28 days by the female. The eggs are covered with down when the female is off the nest. The young are precocial and nidifugous and feed themselves. They are cared for by the female and become independent after 30–40 days. They first breed when aged two years.

=== Food and feeding ===
This duck dives for crustaceans and molluscs.

== Conservation status ==
The velvet scoter is listed as Vulnerable by the International Union for Conservation of Nature (IUCN). It is one of the species to which the Agreement on the Conservation of African-Eurasian Migratory Waterbirds (AEWA) applies.

== Sources ==
- Cramp, Stanley, ed. (1977). "Melanitta fusca Velvet scoter". Handbook of the Birds of Europe the Middle East and North Africa. The Birds of the Western Palearctic. Vol. I: Ostrich to Ducks. Oxford: Oxford University Press. pp. 644–650. ISBN 978-0-19-857358-6.
