= Iupshara =

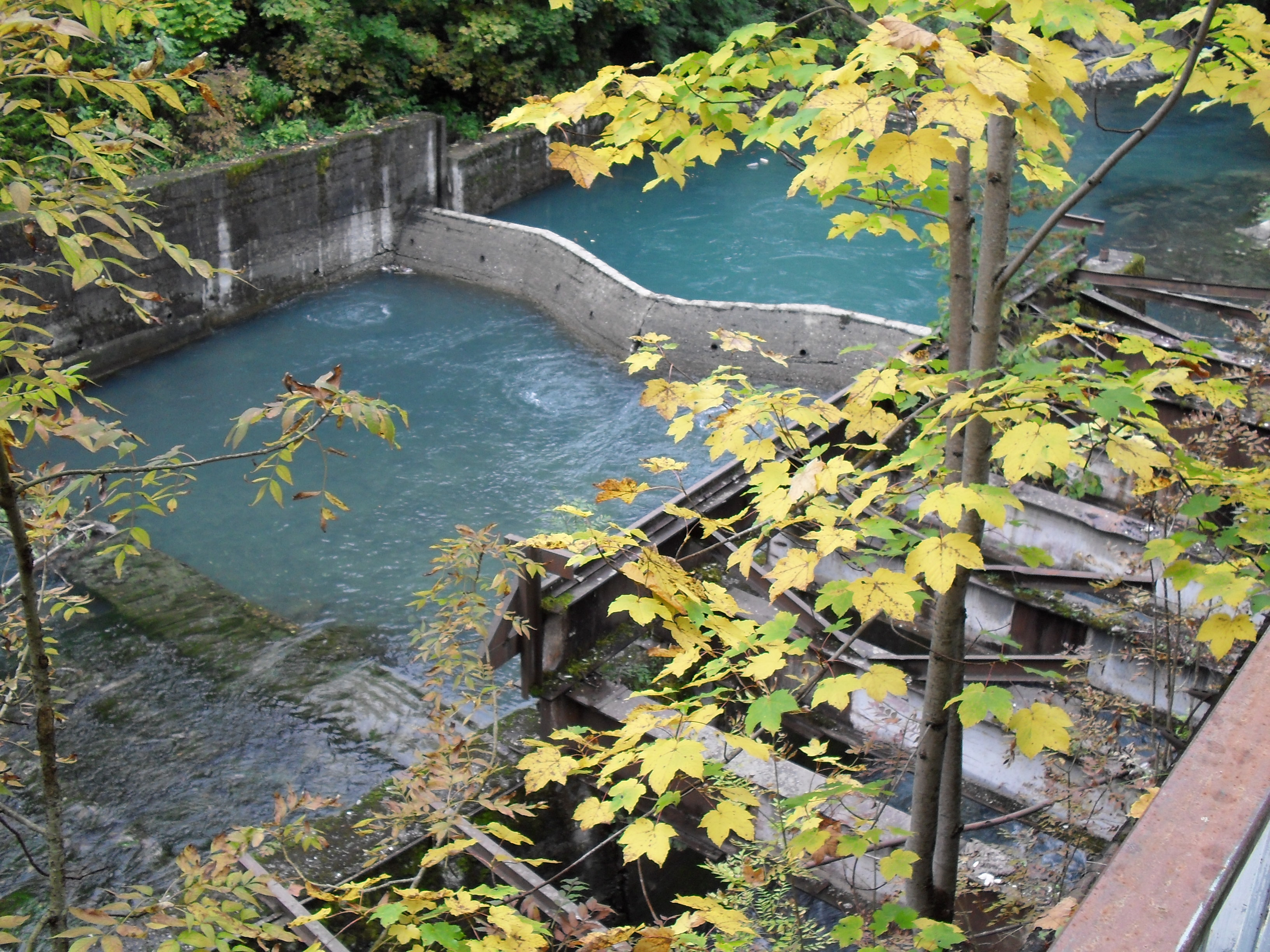
- The Iupshara at its source

- Location within Abkhazia Location within Georgia

Location
- Country: Georgia, Abkhazia

Physical characteristics
- Source: Lake Ritsa
  - coordinates: 43°28′19″N 40°32′00″E
- Mouth
  - location: Gega River
  - coordinates: 43°24′34″N 40°27′44″E
- Length: 12.6 km (7.8 mi)
- Basin size: 170 km^{2} (66 sq mi)

The Iupshara (Georgian: იუფშარა; Abkhaz: Ҩҧсара) is a river in northern Abkhazia, Georgia. The river flows from Lake Ritsa, the deepest lake in Abkhazia (116 m), to the Gega River, a tributary of the Bzyb River.

The total length of the river is 12.6 km (7.8 mi) with a gradient of 48.7 m/km (257 ft/mi). It drains an area of 170 km^{2} (66 mi^{2}). The highest discharge of the Iupshara is in May, 29.6 m^{3}/s (1,050 cu ft/s), and the lowest in February, 0.94 m^{3}/s (33 cu ft/s).
