= Tabatskuri Lake =

Lake in Georgia

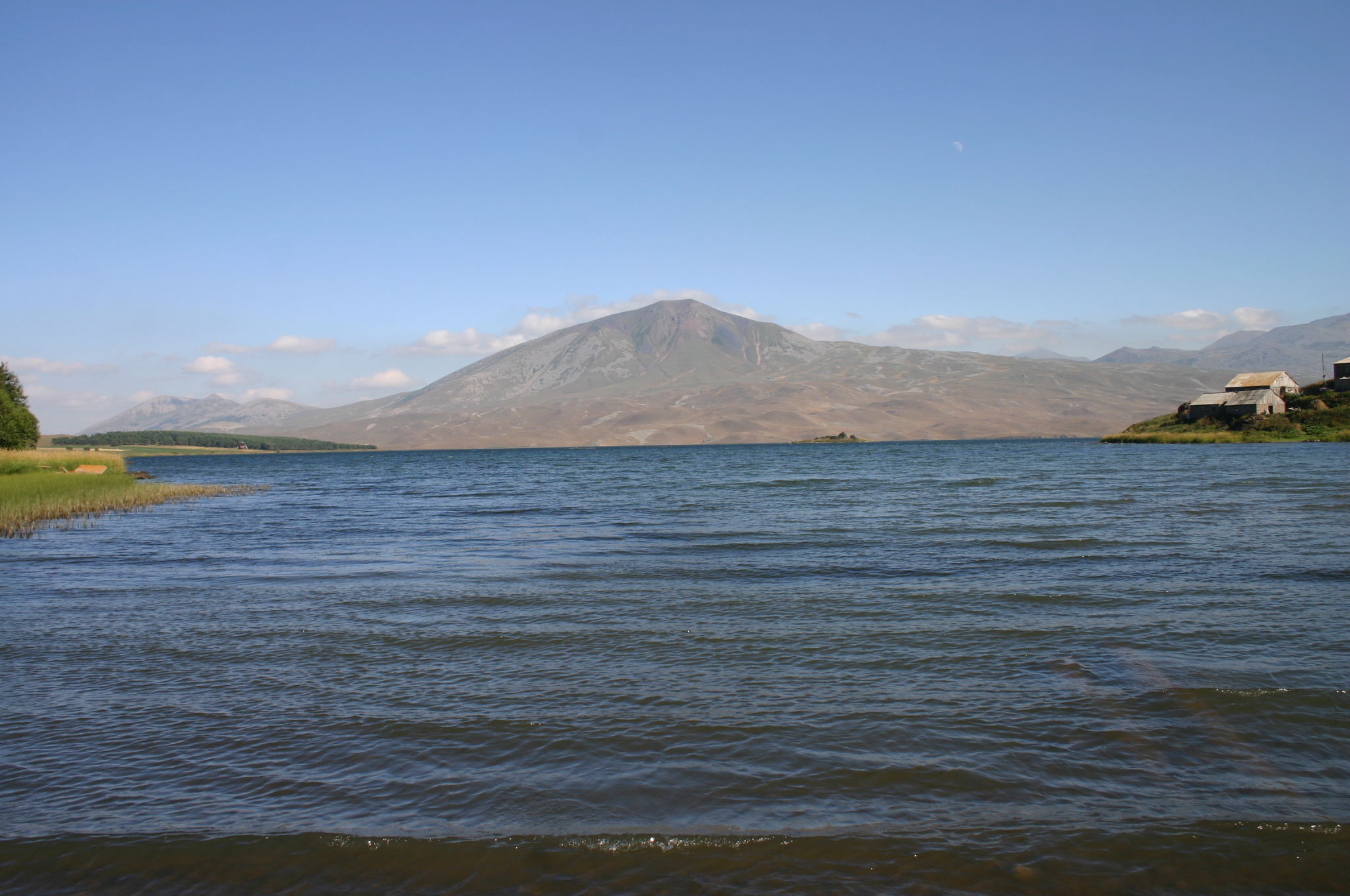

- Location within Samtskhe-Javakheti Location within Georgia
- Interactive map of Tabatskuri Lake
- Coordinates: 41°38′45″N 43°37′33″E
- Catchment area: 83.1 km^{2} (32.1 sq mi)
- Basin countries: Georgia
- Max. length: 6 km (3.7 mi)
- Max. width: 4.5 km (2.8 mi)
- Surface area: 14.2 km^{2} (5.5 sq mi)
- Average depth: 15.5 m (51 ft)
- Max. depth: 40.2 m (132 ft)
- Water volume: 221 million cubic metres (7.8×10^{9} cu ft)
- Surface elevation: 1,991 m (6,532 ft)

Tabatskuri Lake (Georgian: ტაბაწყური) is a lake in the Borjomi Municipality and Akhalkalaki Municipality, Samtskhe–Javakheti region of Georgia.

== Detail ==
Tabatskuri Lake is in the northern part of the Samsari Range, at 1991 m above sea level. Its surface area is 14.2 km^{2}, while the catchment area is 83.1 km^{2}. Its average depth is 15.5 m, maximal depth is 40.2 m. It gets its feed from snow, rainfall and underground waters.

It has a roughly rectangular shape, measuring 6 km long and 4.5 km wide. The annual range of fluctuation of the water level is as much as 1.1 m. Hydrographic network of the basin is poor.

The lake has a volcanic-tectonic origin. The lake is surrounded by the volcanic mountains. From December until March lake is frozen over. Coastline is partially indented. There are many bays and several islands.

The villages of Tabatskuri and Moliti lie around the lake. Tabatskuri is rich in fish, including trout, Common barbel, and Eurasian carp. Tabatskuri part of Ktsia-Tabatskuri Managed Reserve.

In 1745 the lake was described by Prince Vakhushti of Kartli in his work Description of the Kingdom of Georgia.

Lake Tabatskuri was the subject of a documentary film, "Mr. Velvet Scoter", released in May 2023. The film documented the story of the velvet scoter ducks nesting on the lake's island. This small, isolated population has been assessed as the last breeding population of velvet scoter in the Caucasus.

== See also ==
- List of lakes of Georgia
