= Saguramo Range =

Mountain range in Georgia

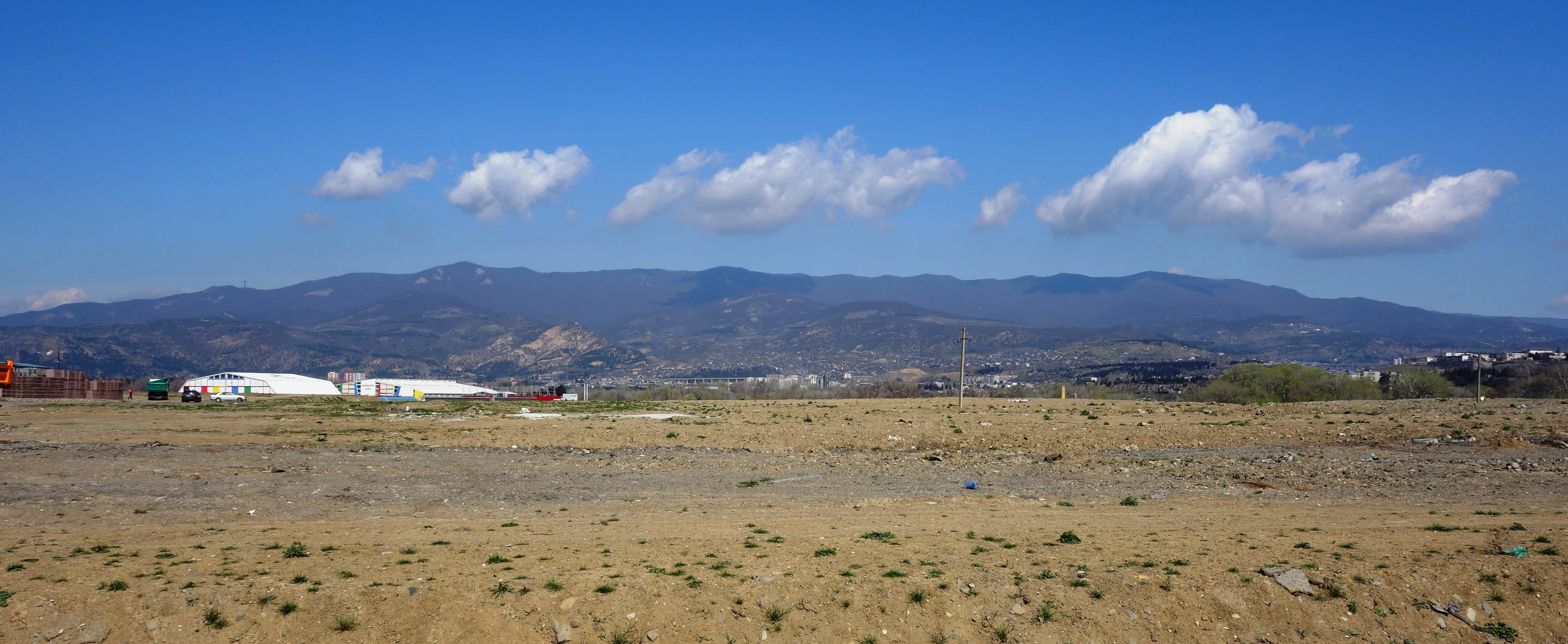
- View of Saguramo Range from the south.

Highest point
- Peak: Saguramo
- Elevation: 1,392 m (4,567 ft)

Geography
- Location within Georgia
- Country: Georgia
- Range coordinates: 41°51′27.61″N 44°51′35.73″E
- Parent range: Caucasus Mountains

Saguramo Range (Georgian: საგურამოს ქედი) is an east–west mountain range in Eastern Georgia located immediately to the north of the city of Tbilisi. The highest mountain of the range is Mt. Saguramo at an elevation of 1,392 meters (4,567 ft.) above sea level. The Saguramo Range forms the western extension of the Ialno Range. The geologic makeup of the mountains consists of neogene sandstone, clay and conglomerates. The area lies in a moderately humid subtropical zone and the slopes of the Saguramo Range are mainly covered by deciduous forests consisting of hornbeam, oak, and maple at lower elevations with beech taking over at higher elevations. The understory layer also includes evergreen elements characteristic of Colchian forests.
