= Government of President Khajimba =

Government of Abkhazia

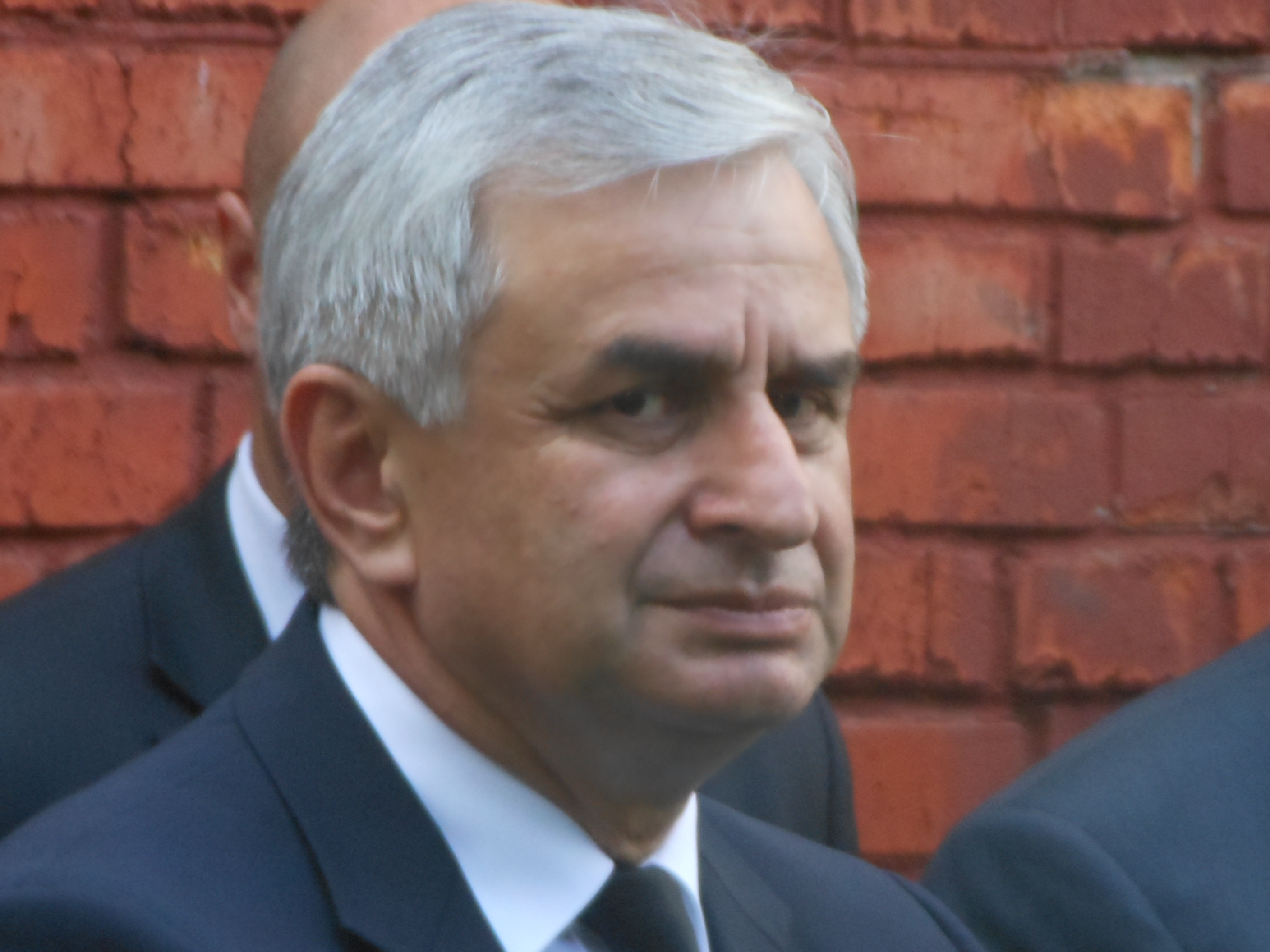

The Government of President Raul Khajimba was the Government of the Republic of Abkhazia from 2014 until 2020.

== Composition ==
President	Raul Khajimba; 25 September 2014 – 12 January 2020											Valery Bganba; 13 January – 24 April 2020
Vice President	Vitali Gabnia; 25 September 2014 – 22 August 2018										Aslan Bartsits; 9 October 2019 – 12 January 2020	
Head of the Presidential Administration	Astamur Tania; 29 September 2014 – 6 May 2016			Dmitri Shamba; May 2016	Beslan Bartsits; 16 May 2016 – 5 August 2016	Dmitri Shamba; 5 August – 10 October 2016	Daur Arshba; 10 October 2016 – 24 April 2018		Beslan Bartsits; 25 April 2018 – 24 April 2020			
Secretary of the Security Council	Mukhamed Kilba; 28 October 2014 – 21 January 2020											Beslan Kvitsinia; 22 January 2020 – 28. července 2020
Head of the State Security Service	Zurab Margania; 29 September 2014 – 12 May 2020											
Cabinet leadership:
Prime Minister	Beslan Butba; 29 September 2014 – 16 March 2015	Shamil Adzynba; 16 – 20 March 2015	Artur Mikvabia; 20 March 2015 – 26 July 2016			Shamil Adzynba; 26 July – 5 August 2016	Beslan Bartsits; 5 August 2016 – 24 April 2018		Gennady Gagulia; 24 April – 8 September 2018	Daur Aršba; 9 – 18 September 2018	Valery Bganba; 18 September 2018 – 24 April 2020	
First Vice Premier	Shamil Adzynba; 15 October 2014 – 15 August 2016								Daur Arshba; 24 April 2018 – 20 January 2020			
Vice Premier(s)	Viktor Khilchevski; 15 October 2014 – 8 April 2015		Dmitri Serikov; 8 April 2015 – 30 April 2018						Djansukh Nanba; 30 April 2018 – 30 April 2020			
Vice Premier(s)	Suren Kerselyan; 15 October 2014 – 8 April 2015						Beslan Eshba; 12 August 2016 – 23 January 2018		Roman Shoua; 30 April 2018 – 28 October 2019		Adgur Ardzinba; 28 October 2019 – 4 May 2020	
Vice Premier(s)						Aslan Kobakhia; 16 August 2016 – 12 October 2017?			Astamur Ketsba; 30 April 2018 – 28 October 2019			
Chief of the Cabinet Staff	Leila Dzyba; 22 October 2014 – 2015		Diana Pilia; 26 May 2015 – 10 February 2017					Zurab Marshania; 10 February – 4 September 2017	David Sangulia; 4 September 2017 – 22 July 2020			
Ministers:
Internal Affairs	Raul Lolua; 15 October 2014 – 14 May 2015		Beslan Khagba; 14 May – 9 October 2015	Leonid Dzapshba; 9 October 2015 – 16 August 2016		Aslan Kobakhia; 16 August 2016 – 12 October 2017		Garri Arshba; 12 October 2017 – 2 December 2019			Levan Kvaratskhelia; 2 – 4 December 2019	Raul Smyr; 4 December 2019 – 30 April 2020
Health since 9 October 2019: Health and Social Security	David Gunba; 15 – 28 October 2014	Andzor Goov; 28 October 2014 – 5 June 2017						Tamaz Tsakhnakia; 5 June 2017 – 29 April 2020				
Foreign Affairs	Viacheslav Chirikba; 17 October 2014 – 20 September 2016						Oleg Arshba – 4 September October 2016	Daur Kove; 4 October 2016 – 15 July 2020				
Culture and the Preservation of Historical and Cultural Heritage	Elvira Arsalia; 15 October 2014 – 5 June 2020											
Defence	Mirab Kishmaria; 15 October 2014 – 1 June 2020											
Education, Science, Sports and Youth Policy since 30 March 2015: Education and Science	Adgur Kakoba; 15 October 2014 – 19 June 2020											
Agriculture	Rafik Otyrba; 15 October 2014 – 8 April 2015		Timur Eshba; 8 April 2015 – 24 August 2016				Daur Tarba; 24 August 2016–present					
Labour, Employment and Social Security	Suren Kerselyan; 15 October 2014 – 23 August 2016					Ruslan Ajba; 23 August 2016 – 28 October 2019						
Finance	Amra Kvarandzia; 17 October 2014 – 12 August 2016					Dmitri Serikov; 12 August 2016 – 30 April 2018				Djansukh Nanba; 30 April 2018 – 28 April 2020		
Economy	Nikolai Achba; 15 October 2014 – 8 April 2015		Adgur Ardzinba; 8 April 2015 – 4 May 2020									
Justice	Marina Pilia; 17 October 2014 – 6 July 2020											
Emergency Situations	Lev Kvitsinia; 17 October 2014 – 29 April 2020											
Energy, Transport and Communications	Viktor Khilchevski; 15 October 2014 – 30 March 2015											
Resorts and Tourism		Avtandil Gartskia; 13 March 2015 – 28 October 2019										
Taxes and Duties			Rauf Tsimtsba; 8 April 2015 – 1 November 2016			Daur Kurmazia; 1 November 2016 – 30 April 2020						
Demography and Repatriation											Beslan Dbar; 31 October 2019 – 29 April 2020	
Chairmen of State Committees:
Repatriation	Khrips Jopua; 21 October 2014 – 11 April 2015		Vadim Kharazia; 11 April 2015 – 28 October 2019									
Ecology and the Environment	Saveli Chitanava; 21 October 2014 – 28 October 2019											
Resorts and Tourism											Avtandil Gartskia; 31 October 2019 – 12 May 2020	
Agriculture											Amiran Kakalia; 31 October 2019 – 19 June 2020	
Standards, Consumer and Technical Supervision	Erik Rshtuni; 23 October 2014 – 1 November 2016					Akhra Pachkoria; 1 November 2016 – 6 November 2019					Garik Samanba; 6 November 2019 – 27 May 2020	
Customs	Daur Kobakhia; 21 October 2014 – 28 October 2019										Guram Inapshba; 28 October 2019 – 22 July 2020	
State Property Management and Privatisation	Konstantin Katsia; 23 October 2014 – 30 August 2016					Vakhtang Pipia; 30 August 2016 – 22 July 2020						
Youth Policy since 16 January 2020: Youth Policy and Sports			Alias Avidzba; 11 April 2015 – 12 September 2017						Teimuraz Kvekveskiri; 12 September 2017 – 16 January 2020		Idris Kara-Osman-ogly; 16 – 30 January 2020	Mikhail Pikanin; 30 January – 21 May 2020
Physical Culture and Sports			Bagrat Khutaba; 11 April 2015 – 16 January 2020									
State Language Policy						Nurbei Lomia; 5 September 2016 – 6 November 2019					Batal Khagush; 6 November 2019 – 19 June 2020	
Statistics											Kama Gogia; 6 November 2019 – 20 May 2020	

== Formation ==
President Raul Khajimba and Vice President Vitali Gabnia were elected on 24 August 2014 after the resignation of previous President Alexander Ankvab, and sworn in on 25 September 2014. Khajimba had led the opposition during the May Revolution against Ankvab. After Ankvab's resignation on 1 June, Speaker of the People's Assembly of Abkhazia Valeri Bganba had been Acting President. During the election, Khajimba competed with State Security Service chairman Aslan Bzhania, Defence Minister Mirab Kishmaria and former Interior Minister Leonid Dzapshba. Vitali Gabnia was chairman of the veterans' movement Aruaa before his election.

On 29 September, Khajimba appointed as prime minister fellow opposition leader Beslan Butba, who had already become Acting Vice Premier following Ankvab's resignation. Khajimba tasked Butba with the formation of the cabinet, which took place over the course of October. Also on 29 September, Khajimba appointed Zurab Margania as Chairman of the State Security Service and Astamur Tania as Head of the Presidential Administration. Margania had previously been deputy chairman, leading the Border Guard, and Tania had been appointed acting Head of the Presidential Administration following Ankvab's resignation.

On 15 October, Khajimba approved the structure of the new cabinet. The decree scrapped one Vice Premier, one Ministry – Taxes and Duties, henceforth the State Tax Service – and two State Committees – Resorts and Tourism, merged into the Ministry of Economy, and Youth and Sport, merged into the Ministry of Education. It also created one new Ministry – Energy, Transport and Communications, created from the State Administration for Transport – and one new State Committee – Standards, Consumer and Technical Supervision, created from the State Administration for Standards, Metrology and Certification. It also reconfirmed the Ministry of Emergency Situations, originally created on 21 July. Two Ministries and one State Committee that were expanded and one Ministry that wasn't were accordingly renamed: the Ministry of Education, Science, Sports and Youth Policy, the Ministry of Culture and the Preservation of Historical and Cultural Heritage, the Ministry of Labour, Employment and Social Security and the State Committee for Ecology and the Environment (previously and Nature).

Also on 15 October, Khajimba appointed the new Vice Premiers and most Ministers, followed by the final four ministers on 17 October, three Heads of State Committees and a number of lower officials on 21 October and the final two Heads of State Committees on 23 October. Of the Cabinet members appointed by Ankvab, only Defence Minister Mirab Kishmaria (who was also a presidential candidate), Foreign Minister Viacheslav Chirikba, Repatriation State Committee Head Khrips Jopua and Property Management and Privatisation State Committee Head Konstantin Katsia retained their post. Moreover, Interior Minister Raul Lolua and Emergency Situations Minister Lev Kvitsinia, who had entered the government as Acting Ministers after Ankvab's resignation, were permanently appointed by Khajimba. The 2011 vice presidential candidate Shamil Adzynba was appointed First Vice Premier, former Vice Premier Viktor Khilchevski Vice Premier and Minister for Energy, Transport and Communications, Suren Kerselyan Vice Premier and Minister for Labour, Employment and Social Security, Rafik Otyrba Agriculture Minister, Nikolai Achba Economy Minister, Adgur Kakoba Minister for Education, Science, Sports and Youth Policy, Elvira Arsalia Minister for Culture and the Preservation of Historical and Cultural Heritage, David Gunba Health Minister, Amra Kvarandzia Finance Minister, Marina Pilia Justice Minister, Saveli Chitanava Head of the State Committee for Ecology and Nature Conservation, Daur Kobakhia Head of the State Customs Committee and Erik Rshtuni Head of the State Committee for Standards, Consumer and Technical Supervision.

On 22 October, Khajimba appointed Leila Dzyba as the new Chief of the Cabinet Staff. On 28 October, he appointed Mukhamed Kilba as Secretary of the Security Council.

== Changes ==
- Shortly after his appointment, Health Minister David Gunba confessed to Prime Minister Butba and President Khajimba that he did not feel up to the task. On 28 October 2014, Khajimba appointed Andzor Goov in his stead.
- On 13 March, President Khajimba carved the Ministry for Resorts and Tourism out of the Ministry for Economy, and appointed Avtandil Gartskia as Minister, who had for some months been acting Security Council Secretary following the ouster of President Ankvab.
- On 16 March, President Khajimba dismissed Prime Minister Butba and appointed First Vice Premier Adzynba as acting prime minister. In a press conference afterwards, Butba said that he had made Khajimba aware of his intention to resign. He claimed that the Presidential Administration had taken over many of the responsibilities of the Prime Minister, creating a 'second government'. There had been rumors of Butba's resignation almost since the beginning of his term, explained variously by a power struggle between Butba and Khajimba and by Butba's supposed bad performance as prime minister.
  - On 20 March, Khajimba appointed MP and former United Abkhazia Chairman Artur Mikvabia as Butba's successor.
  - On 30 March, Khajimba approved the new cabinet structure, on 8 April he appointed Ministers and on 11 April Chairmen of the State Committees. The number of Vice Premiers was reduced from two to one, with Aquafon Deputy Director General of Operations Dmitri Serikov replacing Suren Kerselyan, who remained Labour Minister, and Viktor Khilchevski, who did not return as Minister, as the Ministry of Energy, Transport and Communications was abolished. The Ministry for Taxes and Duties was re-established and Rauf Tsimtsba, who had already been Minister under Alexander Ankvab, was re-appointed. The policy areas of Youth and Sport were transferred from the Ministry of Education and Science to two separate State Committees, headed by Alias Avidzba and Bagrat Khutaba, respectively. Finally, Rafik Otyrba was replaced as Agriculture Minister by former Gulripshi District Governor Timur Eshba, Nikolai Achba as Economy Minister by Adgur Ardzinba and Khrips Jopua as Repatriation State Committee chairman by Vadim Kharazia.
- In May, following two confrontations between police officers and members of the State Security Service, Interior Minister Raul Lolua handed in his resignation. It was accepted by President Khajimba on the evening of 14 May, and he appointed former Gagra District Prosecutor Beslan Khagba as Logua's successor.
- On 26 May, Khajimba appointed Diana Pilia as Head of the Cabinet Staff.
- On 9 October, Khajimba dismissed Interior Minister Khagba, and appointed Leonid Dzapshba, who had already held the post from 2010 to 2011 under President Sergei Bagapsh and who had scored a 3.4% fourth place in the 2014 presidential election.
- On 4 May 2016, Khajimba dismissed Deputy Head of the Presidential Administration Astamur Appba upon the latter's request. On 6 May, he accepted the resignation of Head of the Presidential Administration Astamur Tania. In the following days, Presidential Representative to the People's Assembly of Abkhazia Dmitri Shamba served as acting Head of the Presidential Administration. On 16 May, he appointed Gagra District Head Beslan Bartsits as Tania's successor, and on 7 June, First Vice President of the Chamber of Commerce Adgur Lushba as deputy Head.
- On 30 June, Prime Minister Mikvabia formally opened the new Treasury Department within the Ministry for Finance.
- Following a pending motion of no-confidence against him, the storming of the Interior Ministry by opposition activists and a failed referendum to bring about an early presidential election, Mikvabia announced his resignation as prime minister on 26 July 2016, accepted on the same day by Khajimba. In an interview with Caucasian Knot, Mikvabia stated that the strong unrest in society was being caused by the government's efforts to structurally improve the financial situation of Abkhazia through measures such as the introduction of VAT, that he did not want to work under conditions where society itself hindered development and that he hoped his resignation would defuse tensions. Khajimba appointed Adzynba as acting prime minister for the second time.
  - On 5 August, Khajimba appointed newly appointed Presidential Administration Head Beslan Bartsits as the new prime minister. Bartsits in turn was temporarily succeeded by First Deputy Head Dmitri Shamba, until Vice Speaker of the People's Assembly Daur Arshba became his permanent replacement on 10 October.
  - The structure of the new cabinet was only decreed on 5 September, one month after Bartsits's appointment, increasing the number of Vice Premiers from two to three, abolishing the post of First Vice Premier and introducing the State Committee for State Language Policy. Most appointments had already been made by that point.
  - On 12 August, Beslan Eshba, who had held the same role in the Government of President Ankvab, was appointed Vice Premier, while Dmitri Serikov was re-appointed as Vice Premier and appointed as finance minister, replacing Amra Kvarandzia.
  - On 15 August, outgoing First Vice Premier Shamil Adzynba gave an interview with Sputnik Abkhazia in which he declared that he had applied for resignation because a number of recent appointments directly contravened the Law on Language which required the use of Abkhaz by government officials. Adzynba's resignation was granted that evening by President Khajimba.
  - On 16 August, MP and former State Customs Committee chairman under President Vladislav Ardzinba Aslan Kobakhia was appointed as the third Vice Premier and as Minister for Internal Affairs. Suspended outgoing Interior Minister Dzapzhba was appointed presidential advisor on law enforcement agencies instead.
  - On 23 August, Pension Head Ruslan Ajba was appointed Labour Minister, replacing Suren Kerselyan, while the Ministers for Culture, Emergency Situations, Defence and Tourism were re-appointed.
  - On 24 August, veteran politician Daur Tarba was appointed Agriculture Minister instead of Timur Eshba and the Ministers for Economy, Justice, Health and Education were re-appointed.
  - On 30 August, the Chairmen of the State Committees for Youth and Sport were re-appointed, while former Vice Premier Vakhtang Pipia replaced Konstantin Katsia as Chairman of the State Committee for State Property.
  - On 5 September, linguist Nurbei Lomia was appointed chairman of the new State Committee for State Language Policy.
  - On 20 September, outgoing Foreign Minister Viacheslav Chirikba released a statement in which he announced his resignation because he was unable to continue in his post under the current circumstances. The presidential press service responded by claiming that Chirikba had not been re-appointed because he had failed to lead a delegation to Transnistria in early September. Chirikba refuted this in another statement in which he explained that he had not been able to lead the delegation due to an attack of hypertension and claimed that the decision to re-appoint him had already been made at that point and that he had originally submitted his resignation on 31 August after Khajimba had for more than a month refused to meet him to discuss foreign affairs. In a press conference one week later, Khajimba specified that Chirikba had not been active enough as foreign minister and that as head of the Ministry, he had to be held responsible for certain financial irregularities that had been uncovered by the Control Chamber. On 4 October, Khajimba appointed as Chirikba's successor Daur Kove, head of the Presidential Protocol Department and previously Deputy Foreign Minister. In the intervening period, Deputy Minister Oleg Arshba had served as acting Minister.
  - On 1 November, Khajimba reappointed the Chairman of the State Committee for Ecology and appointed Akhra Pachkoria as Chairman of the State Committee for Standards instead of Erik Rshtuni and Daur Kurmazia as Tax Minister instead of Rauf Tsimtsba.
  - On 5 November, the three-month deadline for appointing the new government formally expired. On 14 November, the Chairmen of the Customs and Repatriation State Committees were re-appointed.
- On 10 February 2017 the Chief of the Cabinet Staff Diana Pilia appointed as a new member of the Constitutional court, therefore her deputy Zurab Marshania temporarily assumed her place as a Chief of the Cabinet Staff. David Sangulia was appointed as a definite solution more than half-year later on 4 September.
- In June 2017 Health Minister Andzor Goov resigned and Tamaz Tsakhnakia became his successor on 5 June.
- On 12 September 2017 Teimuraz Kvekveskiri was appointed as a new Chairman of the Youth Policy State Committee.
- On 12 October 2017 President Khajimba appointed the new Interior Minister Garri Arshba.
- On 24 April 2018 President Khajimba made a decision to do major changes in his government and the first move was to issue a decree of appointment of the new Prime Minister Gennady Gagulia. The previous Prime Minister Beslan Bartsits returned to his position of the Head of the Presidential Administration.
- On 30 April of that year the Vice Premiers were changed (Astamur Ketsba and Roman Shoua) as well as one Minister. Djansukh Nanba was appointed as a new finance minister.
- On 22 August Vice President Vitali Gabnia resigned. His move was motivated by his desire to protect his honour and as a protest against injustice and against inaction of the justice in Abkhazia because of a recent case about a physical attack on him. His office remained vacant after his resignation.
- After a tragic event resulting in death of the Prime Minister Gennady Gagulia on 8 September 2018 First Vice Premier Daur Arshba was appointed as his temporary successor. On 18 September 2018 the proper Gagulia's successor was appointed: Valeri Bganba.
- On 21 September 2018 the Agriculture Minister Daur Tarba resigned. Since then no successor had been appointed.
- On 9 October 2019 President Raul Khajimba was sworn in as he had been re-elected on 8 September. He chose a new Vice President Aslan Bartsits. Next day Khajimba accepted resignation of the entire cabinet in wake of the elections.
- On 28 October 2019 President Khajimba issued a decree of government restructuring. Ministries of Resorts and Tourism, Labour, Employment and Social Security, and Agriculture were abolished. Social Security department was transferred to the Health Ministry and for the tourism and agriculture two new State Committees were created. But the State Committee for Repatriation was reformed as a Ministry and the State Committee for Ecology and the Environment was abolished. On the same day he re-appointed the people from his previous cabinet: his prime minister, First Vice Premier, Head of the Presidential Administration and some other ministers or chairmen of the State Committees. He appointed Guram Inapshba as a new head of the Customs State Committee. Three days later Beslan Dbar was appointed as a new head of newly created Demography and Repatriation Ministry and Avtandil Gartskia was appointed as a new head of the Tourism State Ministerm to continue his work in this department. On 6 November new heads of some State Committees were appointed: Garik Samanba as a head of the Standards, Consumer and Technical Supervision State Committee, Batal Khagush as head of the State Language Policy Committee and Kama Gogia as a head of the Statistics Committee.
- As a result of the pressure from about 300 protesters, on 2 December 2019 Khajimba was forced to dismiss his Interior Minister Garri Arshba. According to Khajimba, the official reason from his dismissal were dissatisfactory results of investigation the case of a recent mass murder which enacted this political crisis. The Ministry was temporarily led by its Deputy Minister Levan Kvaratskhelia. Arshba's official successor became Raul Smyr two days later.
- On 12 January 2020 President Raul Khajimba resigned from his office as a result of the strong opposition protests taking place in Sukhumi for several days after the results of the aforementioned presidential elections were nullified by the decision of the Supreme Court of the Republic of Abkhazia. The same day his Vice Prezident Aslan Bartsits filled his resignation as well. This meant the end of this government whose members were now in the roles of acting ministers, heads of the State Committees etc., until new government was appointed. The People's Assembly of Abkhazia appointed the Prime Minister Valery Bganba as an acting president who then left the majority of Khajimba's cabinet in their positions. He only merged the State Committees for the Youth Policy and for the Physical Culture and Sports. On 16 January 2020 Idris Kara-Osman-ogly became a new head of this merged State Committee.
- On 20 January 2020 Daur Arshba resigned from his position of the First Vice Premier. Two days later Bganba appointed Beslan Kvitsinia as an acting Secretary of the Security Council.
- On 30 January, after 2 weeks in the office, Idris Kara-Osman-ogly resigned from his position of the Chairman of the State Committee for the Youth Policy and Sports. His successor became Mikhail Pikanin
- On 24 April 2020 Aslan Bzhania, new president of the Republic of Abkhazia, was sworn in. On that day he accepted the resignation of this cabinet. The ministers continued their work until Bzhania appointed their successors.
