= Dmitri Shamba =

Abkhazian politician (born 1981)

Acting Head of the Presidential Administration of Abkhazia
- Incumbent
- Assumed office 5 August 2016
- President: Raul Khajimba
- Preceded by: Beslan Bartsits
- In office 6 May 2016 – 16 May 2016
- Preceded by: Astamur Tania
- Succeeded by: Beslan Bartsits

Personal details
- Born: December 6, 1981 (age 44) New Athos

Dmitri Shamba is the Plenipotentiary Representative of the President of Abkhazia to the People's Assembly of Abkhazia and the First Deputy Head of the Presidential Administration.

== Early life and education ==
Shamba was born on 12 June 1981 in New Athos. He finished Gudauta School no. 7 in 1998, and graduated in Jurisprudence at the Abkhazian State University in 2003.

== Career in the Presidential Administration of Abkhazia ==
On 1 March 2005, became senior consultant in the Law and Economics Department of the Presidential Administration of newly elected President Sergei Bagapsh. On 9 January 2009, Shamba was promoted to Head the Legal Sector of the Law and Economics Department, and on 12 January, he was additionally appointed as Plenipotentiary Representative of the President to the People's Assembly. Following the death of Bagapsh in 2011, his successor Alexander Ankvab promoted Shamba to First Deputy Head of the Presidential Administration on 11 October 2011, in place of Zurab Kajaja (in addition to his role as Representative to Parliament). Following the resignation of Ankvab during the May 2014 revolution and the subsequent election of Raul Khajimba, Shamba was one of few officials to retain his post, being reappointed on 1 October 2014. On two occasions, Shamba temporarily served as acting Head of the Presidential Administration, following the resignation of Astamur Tania on 6 May 2016 and the appointment of Beslan Bartsits as Prime Minister on 5 August 2016.
