= Erik Rshtuni =

Abkhazian politician

Erik Rshtuni was Chairman of the State Committee for Standards, Consumer and Technical Supervision of Abkhazia in the Government of President Khajimba from 2014 until 2016. Rshtuni was first appointed on 23 October 2014, after Raul Khajimba's election, who created the State Committee out of the State Administration for Standards, Metrology and Certification. Rshtuni served in the cabinets of Prime Ministers Beslan Butba and Artur Mikvabia, but he was replaced by Akhra Pachkoria on 1 November 2016, following the appointment of Beslan Bartsits as Prime Minister.
