= Shamil Adzynba =

Abkhazian politician

- Шамиль Аӡынба (Abkhaz) შამილ აძინბა (Georgian)

Prime Minister of Abkhazia Acting
- In office 26 July 2016 – 5 August 2016
- President: Raul Khajimba
- Preceded by: Artur Mikvabia
- Succeeded by: Beslan Bartsits
- In office 16 March 2015 – 20 March 2015
- Preceded by: Beslan Butba
- Succeeded by: Artur Mikvabia

First Vice Premier of Abkhazia
- In office 15 October 2014 – 15 August 2016
- Prime Minister: Beslan Butba; Artur Mikvabia; Beslan Bartsits
- Preceded by: Irina Vardania

Personal details
- Born: 21 May 1970 (age 56) Batumi, Adjar ASSR, Georgian SSR
- Party: Party for the Economic Development of Abkhazia

Shamil Adzynba (Abkhaz: Шамиль Аӡынба, Georgian: შამილ აძინბა; born 21 May 1970) is the current First Vice Premier of Abkhazia in the Government of President Khajimba, and a two-time acting Prime Minister.

== August 2011 Presidential election ==
A presidential election was originally scheduled to take place in 2014, however, the Constitution of Abkhazia required an election to be held within three months after the unexpected death of incumbent president Sergei Bagapsh on 29 May 2011. Only three candidates participated: outgoing vice president and acting president Alexander Ankvab, outgoing prime minister Sergei Shamba and opposition leader Raul Khajimba. Shamil Adzynba was picked by Shamba as his vice presidential candidate. The pair was nominated by an initiative group on 8 July and applied for registration on 16 July. All candidates passed their Abkhaz language test on 20 July 2011, were formally registered by the Central Election Commission on 25 July and received their certificates on 26 July.

Shamba and Adzynba received political support from the Party for Economic Development on 21 July, 10 (out of 12) members of the Association of Youth Organisations on 28 July and the Communist Party 9 August.

The election was won by Alexander Ankvab. The Shamba-Adzynba ticket came in second place with 21.02% of the vote, narrowly ahead of Khajimba.

== First Vice Premier and acting Prime Minister (since 2014) ==
Adzynba was appointed First Vice Premier by Khajimba on 15 October 2014.

When President Khajimba dismissed Prime Minister Butba on 16 March 2015, he appointed Adzynba as Acting Prime Minister. On 20 March, Khajimba appointed MP Artur Mikvabia as Butba's permanent replacement.

Adzynba was again appointed acting Prime Minister on 26 July 2016, following Mikvabia's resignation. On 15 August, Adzynba gave an interview with Sputnik Abkhazia in which he declared that he had applied for resignation because a number of recent appointments directly contravened the Law on Language which required the use of Abkhaz by government officials. Adzynba's resignation was granted that evening by President Khajimba.

Political offices
Preceded by Irina Vardania	First Vice Premier of Abkhazia; 2014–2016	Succeeded by
Preceded by Beslan Butba	Prime Minister of Abkhazia; Acting; 2015	Succeeded by Artur Mikvabia
Preceded by Artur Mikvabia	Prime Minister of Abkhazia; Acting; 2016	Succeeded by Beslan Bartsits
