= Liudmila Khojashvili =

Abkhazian Politician

Judge of the Constitutional Court
- Incumbent
- Assumed office 29 November 2016

Minister for Justice
- In office 7 April 2005 – 31 October 2011
- Prime Minister: Alexander Ankvab; Sergei Shamba
- Preceded by: Gennadi Stepanov
- Succeeded by: Yekaterina Onishchenko

Personal details
- Born: 1957 (age 68–69)

Liudmila Khojashvili is a former Justice Minister and a current judge of the Constitutional Court of Abkhazia.

== Early life ==
Khojashvili was born in 1957. In 1986, she graduated from the Law Faculty of the Turkmen State University.

== Career ==
Between November 1973 and September 1983, Khojashvili worked as court clerk, first at the Ashgabat regional court and from May 1980 onwards at the Supreme Court of the Turkmen SSR. From January 1983 until March 1987, Khojashvili worked as senior consultant at the Turkmen Justice Ministry. In March 1987, following her graduation, Khojashvili became a judge at the Kopetdag District Court. She served as judge throughout the dissolution of the Soviet Union and Turkmenistan's independence, until March 1995, when she moved to Abkhazia.

On 18 May 1995, Khojashvili became Deputy Minister for Justice of Abkhazia. On 7 April 2005, following the election of Sergei Bagapsh as president, Khojashvili was appointed as the new Justice Minister under Prime Minister Alexander Ankvab. She was re-appointed under Prime Minister Sergei Shamba after Bagapsh's re-election in 2009. On 31 October 2011, she was replaced by Ankvab, Bagapsh's successor as president.

Khojashvili is associate professor at the Abkhazian State University and Head of the Department of Civil Law and Procedure, and she teaches civil procedure.

On 22 November 2016, Khojashvili was elected as judge of the newly created Constitutional Court by the People's Assembly. She was only one of two candidates out of a total of five nominated by President Raul Khajimba to be elected, receiving 26 out of 35 votes, with a two-thirds majority being required. On 29 November, Khojashvili was formally sworn in.
