= Forum for the National Unity of Abkhazia =

Forum for the National Unity of Abkhazia Аԥсны Жәлар Ракзаара Афорум Форум Народного единства Абхазии აფხაზეთის ეროვნული ერთიანობის ფორუმი
- Leader: Daur Arshba
- Founded: February 8, 2005
- Ideology: Nationalism
- Colours: Red, Green
- People's Assembly: 0 / 35

Forum for the National Unity of Abkhazia (Note: Abkhaz: Аԥсны Жәлар Ракзаара Афорум; Russian: Форум Народного единства Абхазии; Georgian: აფხაზეთის ეროვნული ერთიანობის ფორუმი, romanized: apkhazetis erovnuli ertianobis porumi), often abbreviated as FNUA, is a prominent oppositional political party in Abkhazia. It is led by Abkhazian politician Raul Khajimba, who once took office as the President, Prime Minister, and Vice President of Abkhazia in separate terms.

== History ==
The FNUA was founded on 8 February 2005 to unite 12 opposition parties, socio-political movements, public organisations and youth organisations, which however continued to exist as individual entities. It mainly brought together supporters of Raul Khajimba in the October 2004 presidential election. Khajimba had lost that election, but became Vice President following the power-sharing agreement concluded to end the post-election crisis. The early FNUA later considered the strict implementation of the power-sharing agreement as one of its principal tasks. The party was initially governed by a coordinating board of twelve members, headed by Gennady Alamia, co-chairman of the Social-Democratic Party of Abkhazia.

The FNUA became a socio-political movement on 10 October 2005 when Avtandil Gartskia, Vitali Gabnia and Daur Arshba were elected its co-chairmen. On 6 March 2008 the FNUA was transformed into a political party and Daur Arshba and Astamur Tania became its two co-chairmen.

In the run-up to the 2009 Presidential election, the FNUA intended to nominate Raul Khajimba and Zaur Ardzinba, but in the end the pair could not agree on who would get what position, and the congress of the FNUA, which was planned for 29 October, was called off. Khajimba and Ardzinba then entered the election separately, ending up 2nd and 3rd respectively, behind incumbent President Sergei Bagapsh.

On 12 May 2010, the FNUA held a congress during which the number of Chairmen was reduced to a single person, which was followed by the reduce of the total of Deputy Chairmen to two. Raul Khajimba was elected to the new leadership position, with Daur Arshba and Rita Lolua becoming his deputies.

On 10 July 2013, the Forum signed a cooperation agreement with fellow opposition parties United Abkhazia, the People's Party of Abkhazia and the Party for the Economic Development of Abkhazia, and with a number of social movements.

On 31 March 2015, Daur Arshba again succeeded Khajimba as Chairman.

On 2 March 2016, the FNUA condemned the planned referendum to hold an early presidential election. After the referendum had been approved by President Khajimba, the party held a congress on 10 June in the hall of the hotel Inter-Sukhum, attended by 356 delegates, during which various speakers called for a boycott of the referendum.

== Original composition ==
The Forum for the National Unity of Abkhazia originally brought together three political parties:

- the People's Party of Abkhazia
- the Social-Democratic Party of Abkhazia
- the Republican Party of Abkhazia

one socio-political movement:

- Aidgylara

six public organisations and movements:

- Aiaaira
- Akhatsa
- the Union of Defenders of Abkhazia
- Rodina
- Apsadgil
- the Abkhazian branch of the LDPR

and two youth organisations:

- Smena
- the Social-Democratic Youth of Abkhazia

== Election results ==
=== Presidential ===
Year	Candidate	First round	Second round	Result
2005	Sergei Bagapsh	91.54%	-	Won
2009	Raul Khajimba	15.32%	-	2nd place
2011	Raul Khajimba	19.82%	-	3rd place
2014	Raul Khajimba	50.60%	-	Won
2019	Raul Khajimba	26.33%	48.68%	Won
2020	Adgur Ardzinba	36.93%	-	2nd place
2025	Adgur Ardzinba	38.03%	42.25%	2nd place

=== Parliamentary ===
Year	Seats	Places
2007	28	1st
2012	6	1st
