= Marina Pilia =

Minister for Justice of Abkhazia

Minister for Justice
- Incumbent
- Assumed office 17 October 2014
- Prime Minister: Beslan Butba; Artur Mikvabia; Beslan Bartsits
- Preceded by: Yekaterina Onishchenko

Marina Pilia is the current Minister for Justice of Abkhazia. Pilia was appointed on 17 October 2014 by newly elected President Raul Khajimba.
