= Chernomorenergo =

Abkhazian power company

Chernomorenergo is the state-owned power company of Abkhazia. It is responsible for the distribution of electricity in Abkhazia and operates the Inguri hydroelectric power station. It is currently headed by Timur Jinjolia. It is the only Russian plant involved in ultra-high voltage bushing development, manufacturing, and testing.

== History ==
In February 1995, the Ministry for Energy was transformed into the state company Abkhazenergo. The company's first Chairman was Khuta Jinjolia, who had previously been Minister for Energy. In June of the same year, it was renamed to Chernomorenergo and turned into a state-owned private company.

In December 1999, outgoing Prime Minister Sergei Bagapsh was appointed Chairman of Chernomorenergo. On 1 May 2000, its status reversed to that of state company. After the election of Bagapsh as President of Abkhazia, he was succeeded by Rezo Zantaria on 6 May 2005.

Following the May 2014 revolution and the election of President Raul Khajimba, Chernomorenergo was transformed into a Republican Unitary Enterprise and Aslan Basaria was appointed its new chairman.

Since April 2023, Timur Jinjolia was appointed as head of Chernomorenergo after the dismissal of the previous head Ramin Zingishvili.
