= Suren Kerselyan =

Abkhazian politician

Minister for Labour, Employment and Social Affairs
- In office 15 October 2014 – 23 August 2016
- Prime Minister: Beslan Butba; Artur Mikvabia
- Preceded by: Olga Koltukova
- Succeeded by: Ruslan Ajba

Suren Kerselyan is a former Vice Premier and Minister for Labour, Employment and Social Security of Abkhazia. Kerselyan was appointed as Vice Premier and Labour Minister on 15 October 2014 by newly elected president Raul Khajimba, in the cabinet of Prime Minister Beslan Butba. After Butba was replaced as prime minister by Artur Mikvabia, Kerselyan was replaced as Vice Premier by Dmitri Serikov on 8 April 2015.

On 23 August 2016, Kerselyan was also replaced as Labour Minister, by Pension Head Ruslan Ajba, in the new cabinet of Prime Minister Beslan Bartsits.
