= Daur Arshba =

Acting Prime Minister of Abkhazia

Prime Minister of Abkhazia Acting
- In office 9 September 2018 – 18 September 2018
- President: Raul Khajimba
- Preceded by: Gennadi Gagulia
- Succeeded by: Valeri Bganba

Head of the Presidential Administration
- Incumbent
- Assumed office 10 October 2016
- President: Raul Khajimba
- Preceded by: Beslan Bartsits

Vice Speaker of the People's Assembly of Abkhazia
- In office 12 November 2014 – 10 October 2016
- Preceded by: Adgur Kharazia
- Succeeded by: Valeri Kvarchia

Member of Parliament for Constituency no. 1 (Sukhumi)
- In office 19 July 2013 – 10 October 2016
- Preceded by: Beslan Eshba

Member of Parliament for Constituency no. 30 (Tkvarcheli)
- In office 2007–2012
- Preceded by: Ilia Gamisonia
- Succeeded by: Raul Khajimba

Chairman of the Forum for the National Unity of Abkhazia
- Incumbent
- Assumed office 31 March 2015
- Preceded by: Raul Khajimba
- In office 6 March 2008 – 12 May 2010 Serving with Astamur Tania
- In office 10 October 2005 – 8 March 2008 Serving with Avtandil Gartskia and Vitali Gabnia
- Preceded by: Position established
- Succeeded by: Raul Khajimba

Head of Tkvarcheli District
- In office 31 March 2003 – 22 March 2005
- President: Vladislav Ardzinba
- Preceded by: Valeri Kharchilava
- Succeeded by: Timur Gogua

Personal details
- Born: March 28, 1962 (age 64) Tkvarcheli, Abkhazian ASSR, Georgian SSR, Soviet Union
- Education: Abkhazian State University
- Profession: Politician

Daur Arshba (Russian: Даур Аршба; born 28 March 1962) is an Abkhazian politician. He is the Head of the Presidential Administration, having been appointed by President Raul Khajimba on 10 October 2016, and Chairman of the pro-government Forum for the National Unity of Abkhazia. In the past, he has served as Vice Speaker of the People's Assembly and as Head of Tkvarcheli District. Following the death of Gennadi Gagulia on 8 September 2018, Arshba was appointed Acting Prime Minister of Abkhazia, a position he held until 18 September 2018.

== Early life and career ==
Arshba was born in Tkvarcheli. From 1979 until 1984, he studied at the Faculty for History and Law of the Abkhazian State University.

In September 1996, Arshba became head of the International Department of the Ministry for Foreign Affairs, and in February 1997, First Deputy Minister.

== Head of Tkvarcheli District ==
On 31 March 2003, Arshba was appointed as head of the Tkvarcheli District by President Vladislav Ardzinba, succeeding Valeri Kharchilava, who had announced his desire to resign on the 27th. He was replaced by Ardzinba's successor Sergei Bagapsh in 2005.

== Member of Parliament for Tkvarcheli and Sukhumi, Vice Speaker and Party leader ==
Arshba was one of the initiators of the Forum for the National Unity of Abkhazia (FNUA), founded on 8 February 2005 to unite 12 opposition organisations that had supported Raul Khajimba in the October 2004 presidential election. When the FNUA became a socio-political movement on 10 October 2005, Arshba was elected one of its three co-chairmen. On 6 March 2008 the FNUA was transformed into a political party, of which Arshba became one of two co-chairmen.

In the March 2007 elections, Arshba successfully ran for a seat of the 4th convocation of the People's Assembly of Abkhazia in constituency no. 30 (Tkvarcheli), defeating in the first round his only opponent, incumbent deputy Ilia Gamisonia.

In the March 2012 elections, Arshba switched to constituency no. 25 (Beslakhuba). He won a narrow 35.77% first round plurality against two other candidates, but was defeated by Yuri Zukhba in the run-off.

A year later, Arshba made a successful second attempt to be elected to the 5th convocation of Parliament, in the by-election in constituency no. 1 (Sukhumi) that followed the appointment of Beslan Eshba as Vice Premier by President Ankvab. Arshba was nominated on 14 May by an initiative group. He defeated five other candidates in the first round, held on 29 June, with 1043 out of 3228 votes. In the runoff on 13 July, he defeated former Vice Speaker Irina Agrba with 1974 votes to 1325. The Central Election Committee officially registered Arshba as a Member of Parliament on 19 July.

On 12 May 2010, the FNUA decided to reduce the number of its Chairmen from 2 to 1 and elected Raul Khajimba as its party head, while Arshba became one of his two deputies.

On 12 November 2014, Arshba was unanimously elected to succeed Adgur Kharazia as Vice Speaker of Parliament.

On 31 March, Arshba again succeeded Khajimba as Chairman of the FNUA.

== Head of the Presidential Administration ==
On 10 October 2016, Arshba was appointed as Head of the Presidential Administration to succeed Beslan Bartsits, who had been appointed as Prime Minister.

== See also ==
Political offices
Preceded by Gennady Gagulia	Prime Minister of Abkhazia; Acting; 2018–	Succeeded by Valeri Bganba
