= Khrips Jopua =

Abkhazian politician

Khrips Jopua is a former Chairman of the State Committee for Repatriation of Abkhazia.

== Career ==
On 16 April 2013, Chairman of the State Committee for Repatriation Zurab Adlaiba handed in his resignation, which President Alexander Ankvab accepted on 18 April, temporarily appointing his Deputy Akhmad Marshan in his stead. On 14 June, Jopua was officially appointed as the new Chairman.

Jopua was re-appointed on 21 October 2014 by newly elected President Raul Khajimba.

On 11 April 2015, following the resignation of Prime Minister Beslan Butba, Jopua was replaced by Vadim Kharazia.
