= Timur Eshba =

Minister for Agriculture of Abkhazia from April 2015 to August 2016

Timur Eshba is a former Minister for Agriculture of Abkhazia. He was appointed by President Raul Khajimba on 8 April 2015 into the cabinet of new prime minister Artur Mikvabia, succeeding Rafik Otyrba. On 24 August 2016, Mikvabia was replaced as prime minister by Beslan Bartsits, and veteran politician Daur Tarba was given Eshba's former portfolio.
