= Elvira Arsalia =

Georgian painter (born 1978)

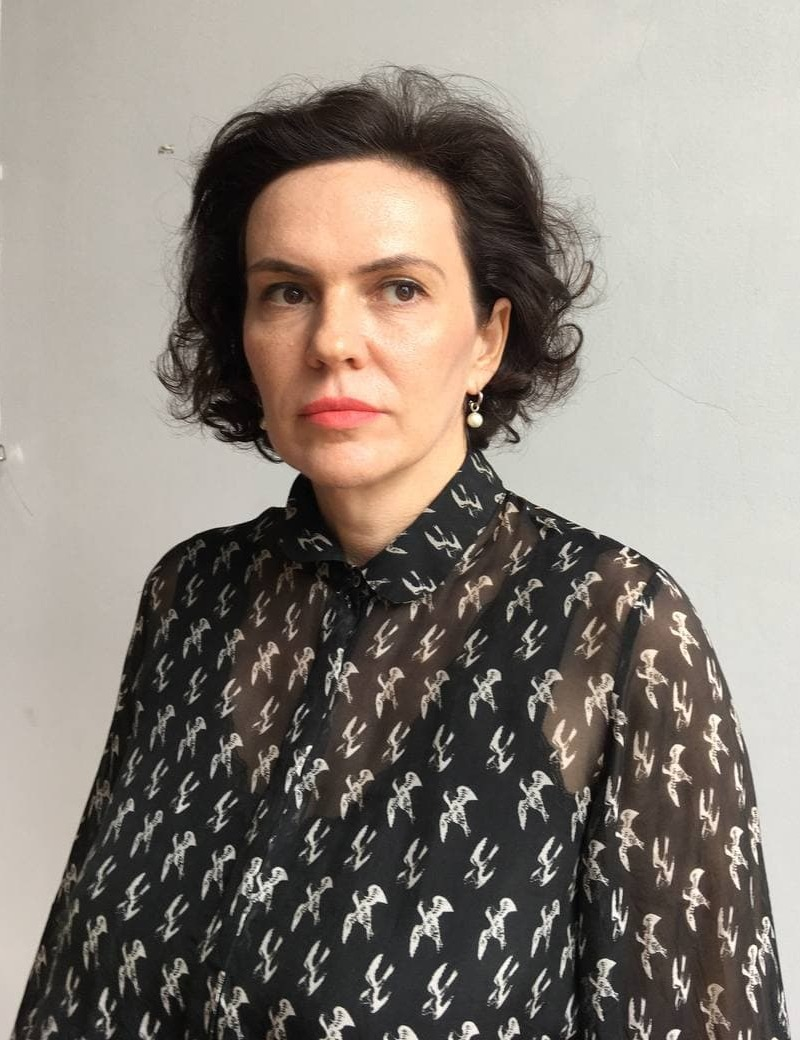
Elvira Arsalia

Elvira Arsalia (born 1978) is the current Minister for Culture and the Preservation of Historical and Cultural Heritage of Abkhazia.

== Early life ==
Arsalia was born in 1978 in Abkhazia. In 2000, she graduated from the Design faculty of the Ufa Technical Institute for Services.

== Career ==
From 2001 until 2014, Arsalia was Director of the Central Exhibition Hall of the Artists Union of Abkhazia. Since 2002, she has been scene-painter at the Abkhaz Drama Theatre. In 2011, Arsalia designed the costumes of the Honour Guard of the President of Abkhazia.

On 15 October 2014, Arsalia was appointed Minister for Culture and the Preservation of Historical and Cultural Heritage by newly elected President Raul Khajimba.

Arsalia is Associate Professor of Fine Arts at the Abkhazian State University. She is a member of the Artists Union of Abkhazia and of the Union of Designers of Russia.
