= Constitutional Court of Abkhazia =

The Constitutional Court of the Republic of Abkhazia was created in 2016. Judges are elected by the People's Assembly with a two-thirds majority for fifteen year terms and may not be re-elected. Candidates are nominated by the President and must have a law degree, at least fifteen years experience in a legal profession and must at least forty years old. A group of at least one third of all deputies may formally propose candidates to the President.

== Composition ==
The law on the Constitutional Court prescribed that it would have five judges, that it would start operating when at least three judges had been sworn in and that this had to happen by 1 January 2017.

In November 2016, President Raul Khajimba nominated five candidates: former Justice Minister Liudmila Khojashvili, former Central Election Chairman Sergei Smir, two time Presidential candidate Iakub Lakoba, as well as Tamaz Ketsba and Raul Pant. On 22 November, the People's Assembly elected Khojashvili and Pant with 26 and 25 votes respectively, while Smyr, Ketsba and Lakoba received only 20, 17 and 12 votes out of 35 total. Parliament's failure to approve three out of five candidates was criticised by Khajimba, claiming that the procedure obliged deputies to vote for or against, while many had in fact abstained, and pointing out that Ketsba's candidacy in particular had been proposed by a group of Parliament members. On 29 November, Khojashvili and Pant were formally sworn in.

Following opposition protests against the government of Khajimba, the opposition and the government reached an agreement whereby the opposition could nominate a new Prosecutor General and two members of the Constitutional Court. It selected the lawyer Roza Zantaria and Sukhumi City Court judge Rustam Chagava. In addition, incumbent Prosecutor General Nuri Tania was nominated as Constitutional Court judge. However, on 29 December, the People's Assembly postponed the vote stating that it rejected Chagava as too inexperienced and that Zantaria had refused the nomination.

Because the deadline on the formation of the Constitutional Court had been missed, on 18 January 2017 the People's Assembly adopted a bill formally postponing the deadline to 1 June 2017. It also elected Tania with the support of 24 of the 27 deputies present. On 10 February, the People's Assembly elected with 25 votes in favour, 2 against and 2 spoiled ballots a different opposition nominee, Head of the Cabinet Staff Diana Pilia.
