= Daur Kobakhia =

Abkhazian politician (born 1970)

Daur Kobakhia is the current Chairman of the State Committee for Customs of Abkhazia. Kobakhia was appointed on 21 October 2014 by newly elected President Raul Khajimba.

== Early life ==
Kobakhia was born on 23 July 1970 in Sukhumi. Between 1991 and 1997, he studied history at the History and Law Faculty of the Abkhazian State University. Kobakhia als graduated in Customs from the Sochi Institute for Fashion, Business and Law. From 1994 onwards, Kobakhia held various positions in the State Customs Committee, starting as a customs inspector.
