= Viktor Khilchevski =

Abkhazian politician

Viktor Khilchevski is a former Vice Premier and Minister for Energy, Transport and Communications of Abkhazia. Khilchevski was appointed on 15 October 2014 by newly elected President Raul Khajimba. On 30 March 2015, following the resignation of Prime Minister Beslan Butba, Khajimba abolished the Ministry for Energy, Transport and Communications and reduced the number of Vice Premiers from two to one. On 8 April, Khilchevski was replaced as Vice Premier by Dmitri Serikov.
