= Dmitri Serikov =

Abkhazian politician (born 1976)

Dmitri Serikov is a vice premier and a former minister of finance of Abkhazia.

== Early life, education and career (until 2015) ==
Serikov was born on 29 November 1976 in Moscow. In 2000 he graduated from the Moscow Engineering Physics Institute, and in 2002, from the Financial University under the Government of the Russian Federation. Between 2000 and 2002, Serikov also worked at the All-Russian Research Institute for Automation.

In 2002, he became accountant-economist at the mobile phone operator Sonic Duo CJSC, which was merged into MegaFon that year. In 2004, Serikov became financial director of Aquafon in Abkhazia. In 2011, he was promoted to the position of Deputy Director General for Operations.

== Political career (since 2015) ==
On 8 April 2015, Serikov was appointed as Vice Premier of Abkhazia in the new cabinet head by Prime Minister Artur Mikvabia, succeeding Viktor Khilchevski and Suren Kerselyan, as the numbers of vice premiers was reduced from two to one.

On 12 August 2016, following the replacement of Mikvabia as prime minister by Beslan Bartsits, Serikov was re-appointed as vice premier and additionally appointed to the post of minister for finance, succeeding Amra Kvarandzia.
