= Otyrba =

Otyrba is an Abkhazian surname. Notable people with the surname include:

- Gueorgui Otyrba, Abkhazian politician and academic
- Rafik Otyrba, Minister for Agriculture of Abkhazia
