= Daur Kurmazia =

Abkhazian politician (born 1974)

4th Minister for Taxes and Fees of Abkhazia
- Incumbent
- Assumed office 1 November 2016
- Prime Minister: Beslan Bartsits
- Preceded by: Rauf Tsimtsba

Personal details
- Born: 24 August 1974 (age 51) Gudauta, Abkhazian ASSR, Georgian SSR, USSR

Daur Leontevich Kurmazia (Russian: Даур Леонтьевич Курмазия; born 28 August 1974) is the current Minister for Taxes and Fees of Abkhazia in the Government of President Khajimba. Kurmazia was appointed on 1 November 2016 in the new cabinet of Prime Minister Beslan Bartsits.
