= Andzor Goov =

Abkhazian politician (born 1961)

Andzor Nazrunovich Goov (Russian: Андзор Назрунович Гоов; born 13 January 1961) is the current Minister for Health of Abkhazia. Goov was appointed by newly elected President Raul Khajimba on 28 October 2014, after his original choice David Gunba resigned, confessing that he did not feel up to the task.
