= Diana Pilia =

Abkhazian jurist (born 1967)

Diana Pilia is a judge of the Constitutional Court of Abkhazia and a former Head of the Cabinet Staff.

== Early life ==
Pilia was born on 15 September 1967 in Gudauta. In 1989 she graduated in jurisprudence from the Faculty for History and Law of the Abkhazian State University.

== Career ==
Since 1989, Pilia has worked in the Department for Public Administration and Law of the Abkhazian State University, as senior lecturer, associate professor and deputy head. From 2003 until 2015, Pilia additionally worked as notary in Sukhumi and between 2007 and 2010, she completed a Candidate of Sciences programme at the Moscow State Law Academy. In 2012, Pilia became chairwoman of the Association of Lawyers of Abkhazia, and she has cofounded the organisation of Businesswomen of Abkhazia.

On 26 May 2015, Pilia was appointed as Head of the Cabinet Staff by President Raul Khajimba, succeeding Leila Dzyba.

Following opposition protests against the government of Khajimba in December 2016, the opposition and the government reached an agreement whereby the opposition could nominate two members of the Constitutional Court. It selected Pilia after its two initial candidates respectively refused and were rejected by the People's Assembly. Pilia was elected on 10 February 2017 with 25 votes in favour, 2 against and 2 spoiled ballots.
