= Prime Minister of Abkhazia =

Deputy head of government of the de facto independent republic

Prime Minister of the Republic of Abkhazia
- Emblem of Abkhazia

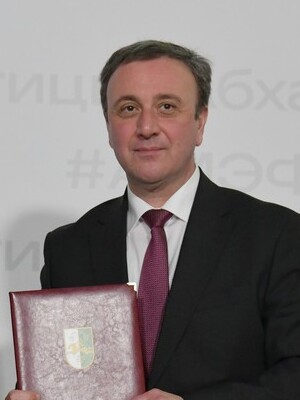
- Incumbent; Vladimir Delba since 3 March 2025
- Type: Deputy head of government
- Member of: Cabinet
- Residence: Sukhumi
- Appointer: President of Abkhazia
- Inaugural holder: Gennady Gagulia
- Formation: 26 November 1994; 31 years ago
- Unofficial names: De-facto Prime Minister of occupied Abkhazia region De facto Prime Minister of occupied Abkhazia
- Deputy: Deputy Prime Minister

The prime minister of Abkhazia (Abkhaz: Аԥсны Аҳәынҭқарра аԥыза-министр, Russian: Премьер-министр Республики Абхазия) is the deputy head of government of the partially recognized Republic of Abkhazia, that is de jure part of Georgia.

== History ==
=== Government of President Vladislav Ardzinba ===
While the presidency was held by one man – Vladislav Ardzinba – from 1994 to 2005, the position of prime minister changed hands a number of times during that time. It was created with the November 1994 adoption of the Constitution of Abkhazia, and Gennady Gagulia was appointed to the position in January 1995.

=== Government of President Sergei Bagapsh ===
After Sergei Bagapsh succeeded Ardzinba to the presidency in February 2005, he appointed Alexander Ankvab as prime minister. Ankvab was Bagapsh's vice presidential candidate in the 12 December 2009 presidential election, and as required by law, he was officially suspended from his post on 11 November and his duties were carried out by First Vice Premier Leonid Lakerbaia. Bagapsh and Ankvab won the election, and on 13 February 2010, Ankvab was succeeded by long-time minister for foreign affairs Sergei Shamba.

=== Government of President Alexander Ankvab ===
After Alexander Ankvab defeated Sergei Shamba in the 2011 presidential election, Leonid Lakerbaia became prime minister.

On 2 June 2014, Lakerbaia resigned as a result of the Abkhazian Revolution and Vice Premier Vladimir Delba was appointed acting prime minister.

=== Government of President Raul Khajimba ===
The 2014 presidential election was won by opposition leader Raul Khajimba, who on 29 September 2014 appointed Beslan Butba as the new prime minister. However, there were rumors of Butba's resignation almost since the beginning of his term, explained variously by a power struggle between Butba and Khajimba and by Butba's supposed bad performance as prime minister. Butba was finally dismissed by President Khajimba on 16 March 2015, and temporarily replaced by First Vice Premier Shamil Adzynba. In a press conference afterwards, Butba said that he had made Khajimba aware of his intention to resign. He claimed that the presidential administration had taken over many of the responsibilities of the prime minister, creating a 'second government'. On 20 March, Khajimba appointed MP and former United Abkhazia chairman Artur Mikvabia as Butba's successor.

Following a pending motion of no-confidence against him, the storming of the Interior Ministry by opposition activists and a failed referendum to bring about an early presidential election, Mikvabia announced his resignation as prime minister on 26 July 2016, accepted on the same day by Khajimba. In an interview with Caucasian Knot, Mikvabia stated that the strong unrest in society was being caused by the government's efforts to structurally improve the financial situation of Abkhazia through measures such as the introduction of VAT, that he did not want to work under conditions where society itself hindered development and that he hoped his resignation would defuse tensions. Khajimba again appointed Adzynba as acting prime minister. On 5 August, he appointed newly-appointed presidential administration head Beslan Bartsits as the new prime minister.

== List of officeholders ==
=== Non-prime ministerial heads of government ===
- Vladimir Mikanba (Acting chairman of the Council of Ministers, 25 August 1990 – 5 May 1992)
- Vazha Zarandia (Chairman of the Council of Ministers, 5 May 1992 – 12 December 1993)
- Sokrat Jinjolia (Chairman of the Council of Ministers, 12 December 1993 – 26 November 1994)

=== List of prime ministers of Abkhazia ===
No.	Portrait	Name (Birth–Death)	Term of office			Political party
No.	Portrait	Name (Birth–Death)	Took office	Left office	Time in office	Political party
1		Gennady Gagulia (1948–2018)	January 1995	29 April 1997	2 years, 3 months	Independent
2		Sergei Bagapsh (1949–2011)	29 April 1997	20 December 1999	2 years, 235 days	Independent
3		Viacheslav Tsugba (born 1944)	20 December 1999	30 May 2001	1 year, 161 days	Independent
4		Anri Jergenia (1941–2020)	7 June 2001	29 November 2002	1 year, 175 days	Independent
(1)		Gennady Gagulia (1948–2018)	29 November 2002	8 April 2003	130 days	Independent
5		Raul Khajimba (born 1958)	22 April 2003	6 October 2004	1 year, 167 days	Independent
6		Nodar Khashba (born 1951)	6 October 2004	14 February 2005	131 days	United Abkhazia
7		Alexander Ankvab (born 1952)	14 February 2005	13 February 2010	4 years, 364 days	Aitaira
8		Sergei Shamba (born 1951)	13 February 2010	27 September 2011	1 year, 226 days	Independent
9		Leonid Lakerbaia (born 1947)	27 September 2011	2 June 2014	2 years, 248 days	Aitaira
—		Vladimir Delba (born 1974); Acting Prime Minister	2 June 2014	29 September 2014	119 days	Independent
10		Beslan Butba (born 1960)	29 September 2014	17 March 2015	169 days	PEDA
—		Shamil Adzynba (born 1970); Acting Prime Minister	17 March 2015	20 March 2015	3 days	Independent
11		Artur Mikvabia (born 1949)	20 March 2015	26 July 2016	1 year, 128 days	United Abkhazia
—		Shamil Adzynba (born 1970); Acting Prime Minister	26 July 2016	5 August 2016	10 days	Independent
12		Beslan Bartsits (born 1978)	5 August 2016	25 April 2018	1 year, 263 days	Independent
(1)		Gennady Gagulia (1948–2018)	25 April 2018	8 September 2018 (Died in office)	136 days	Independent
—		Daur Arshba (born 1962); Acting Prime Minister	8 September 2018	18 September 2018	10 days	Independent
13		Valeri Bganba (born 1953)	18 September 2018	23 April 2020	1 year, 218 days	Independent
(7)		Alexander Ankvab (born 1952)	23 April 2020	18 November 2024	4 years, 209 days	Aitaira
—		Valeri Bganba (born 1953); Acting Prime Minister	18 November 2024	3 March 2025	105 days	Independent
(14)		Vladimir Delba (born 1974)	3 March 2025	Incumbent	1 year, 238 days	Independent

== See also ==
- President of Abkhazia
