= Vadim Kharazia =

Abkhazian politician

Vadim Kharazia is the current Chairman of the State Committee for Repatriation of Abkhazia. Kharazia was appointed on 11 April 2015 by President Raul Khajimba to succeed Khrips Jopua.
