= Alias Avidzba =

Abkhazian politician

Alias Avidzba is the current and first Chairman of the State Committee for Youth Policy of Abkhazia. Avidzba was appointed on 11 April 2015 by President Raul Khajimba — up until that point, Youth Policy had been part of the Ministry for Education.
