= Saveli Chitanava =

Abkhazian politician

Saveli Chitanava is the current Chairman of the State Committee for Ecology and the Environment of Abkhazia. Chitanava was appointed on 21 October 2014 by newly elected President Raul Khajimba.
