= Rafik Otyrba =

Former Minister for Agriculture of Abkhazia

Rafik Otyrba is a former Minister for Agriculture of Abkhazia. Otyrba was appointed on 15 October 2014 by newly elected President Raul Khajimba. On 8 April 2015, following the resignation of Prime Minister Beslan Butba, Otyrba was replaced by Timur Eshba.
