= Leila Dzyba =

Abkhazian politician

Leila Dzyba is a former Chief of the Cabinet Staff of Abkhazia. Dzyba was appointed on 22 October 2014 by newly elected President Raul Khajimba. On 26 May 2015, Khajimba appointed Diana Pilia as new Head of the Cabinet Staff.

After working in the Presidential Administration, Dzyba was appointed as Deputy Mayor of Sukhumi on 17 January 2017.
