= Gennadi Gagulia =

Abkhazian politician (1948–2018)

- Геннадии Гагәлиа გენადი გაგულია
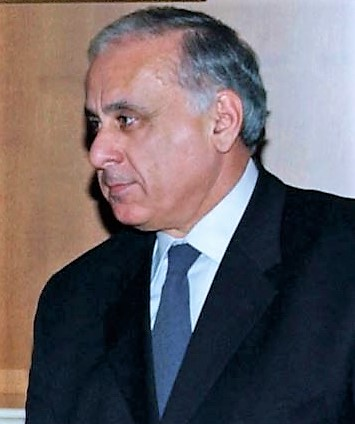
- Gagulia in 2003

Prime Minister of Abkhazia
- In office 25 April 2018 – 8 September 2018
- President: Raul Khajimba
- Preceded by: Beslan Bartsits
- Succeeded by: Daur Arshba (acting)
- In office 29 November 2002 – 8 April 2003
- President: Vladislav Ardzinba
- Preceded by: Anri Jergenia
- Succeeded by: Raul Khajimba
- In office January 1995 – 29 April 1997
- President: Vladislav Ardzinba
- Preceded by: office established
- Succeeded by: Sergei Bagapsh

Head of the Presidential Administration
- In office 15 June 2003 – 15 July 2004
- President: Vladislav Ardzinba
- Preceded by: Miron Agrba

Personal details
- Born: 3 January 1948 Lykhny, Georgian SSR, Soviet Union
- Died: 8 September 2018 (aged 70) Miusera, Georgia (Note: Claimed by Abkhazia, which is unrecognised by most of the international community)
- Spouse: Zair Otyrba
- Children: 2 (one daughter and one son)
- Education: Belarusian National Technical University

Gennadi Leonid-ipa Gagulia (Abkhaz: Геннадии Леонид-иԥа Гагәлиа, Georgian: გენადი გაგულია; 3 January 1948 – 8 September 2018) was an Abkhazian politician who was three-time prime minister of Abkhazia and the head of the Chamber of Commerce and Industry. He served as the first prime minister of Abkhazia after the post was established by the constitution in 1995, holding it until 1997. He returned to the post in 2002 and remained for several months into 2003, and held it for a final time in 2018 for a little over four months until he was killed in a car crash.

== Early life and career ==
Gagulia was born on 3 January 1948 in the Gudauta District of the Abkhaz Autonomous Soviet Socialist Republic. He graduated from the Civil Engineering Department of the Belarusian Polytechnic Institute in 1972 and worked at Stroymaster as the chief engineer and the head of the construction site from 1973 to 1977. He spent the following 15 years as a deputy director of Catering at Lake Rizal and as Chairman of the Gudauta district consumer cooperatives.

== Political career ==
In the year after the Republic of Abkhazia was founded, he worked at the State Committee for Foreign Economic Relations of the Council of Ministers of the republic, before eventually serving as deputy chairman of the Council of Ministers of Abkhazia from 1992 to 1995. During the Georgian-Abkhaz War, Gagulia was a member of the Abkhazian Defense Committee, which was responsible for the distribution of food for the Abkhaz Armed Forces.

=== First Term as Prime Minister (1995–1997) ===
Gagulia became the first Prime Minister of Abkhazia in 1995 following the adoption of the 1994 Constitution of Abkhazia. As prime minister Gagulia had a reputation for being the most pro-Russian of Abkhazia's prime ministers. He steadfastly opposed both reunification with Georgia and the withdrawal of Russian troops from the Georgian-Abkhaz border. He also alluded to the possibility of Abkhazia unifying with Russia. While in this role, he met with a number of foreign leaders, including Russian President Vladimir Putin and Georgian President Eduard Shevardnadze. In 1997, Gagulia resigned from the prime ministership, citing health reasons.

=== Career (1997–2002) ===
In between his first two terms as prime minister, Gagulia served as the chair of the Chamber of Commerce and Industry of Abkhazia. He was also deputy prime minister under Anri Jergenia.

=== Second Term as Prime Minister (2002–2003) ===
When Jergenia was fired on 29 November 2002, Gagulia was appointed as prime minister for the second time. He only served for only 5 months until Gagulia's government filed for resignation on 7 April 2003. Earlier that day, nine Abkhazian prisoners had escaped, four of which had been sentenced to death due to their involvement in the 2001 Kodori crisis. President Ardzinba initially refused to accept Gagulia's resignation, but was forced to agree on 8 April. Vice President Valery Arshba denied on 8 April that the government's resignation was due to the prison escape, and stated that instead it was caused by the opposition's plans to hold protest rallies on 10 April.

=== Career after his Second Term (2003–2018) ===
On 15 December 2003, Gagulia was appointed head of the Presidential administration, succeeding Miron Agrba. On 18 June 2004, Gagulia resigned from his post, stating "There is a certain scenario to the presidential elections in Abkhazia. I don't match this scenario and thus I prefer to step down."

It had been suggested that Ardzinba may have also favoured Gagulia to replace him as president, but Ardzinba instead decided to back then-Prime Minister Raul Khajimba.

On 24 June 2004, Gagulia was again appointed head of the Chamber of Commerce and Industry of Abkhazia, succeeding Yuri Aqaba. Gagulia remained in that position until April 2018.

=== Third Term as Prime Minister (2018) ===
Gagulia was reappointed Prime Minister of Abkhazia in April 2018 by President Raul Khajimba, replacing Beslan Bartsits.

== Death ==
Gagulia was killed in a car accident outside the village of Miusera, Gudauta District on 8 September 2018. He was returning from Sochi International Airport following a 3-day visit with Khajimba to Syria. A car collided with the convoy, and the impact forced Gagulia's car into the ditch. The car was driven by a 22-year-old Abkhaz man, who was, according to local authorities, "under the influence of narcotics". He died on the spot.

Khajimba, who was travelling in the same convoy and witnessed the crash, suggested it was not an assassination attempt or terrorism, but rather an accident.

== Notes ==
Political offices
Preceded by Sokrat Jinjolia	Prime Minister of Abkhazia; January 1995 – 29 April 1997	Succeeded by Sergei Bagapsh
Preceded by Anri Jergenia	Prime Minister of Abkhazia; 29 November 2002 – 8 April 2003	Succeeded by Raul Khajimba
Preceded by Miron Agrba	Head of the Presidential Administration; 15 December 2003 – 18 June 2004	Succeeded by Emma Avidzba
Preceded by Yuri Aqaba	Head of the Chamber of Commerce and Industry; 24 June 2004 – April 2018	Succeeded by Tamila Mertskhulava
Preceded by Beslan Bartsits	Prime Minister of Abkhazia; 24 April 2018 – 8 September 2018	Succeeded by Daur Arshba (Acting)
