= David Gunba =

Abkhazian politician

David Gunba is a former Minister for Health of Abkhazia. Gunba was appointed on 15 October 2014 by newly elected President Raul Khajimba. Shortly thereafter, Gunba confessed to Khajimba and Prime Minister Beslan Butba that he did not feel up to the task. On 28 October 2014, Khajimba appointed Adzor Goov in his stead.
