= Avtandil Gartskia =

Georgian politician

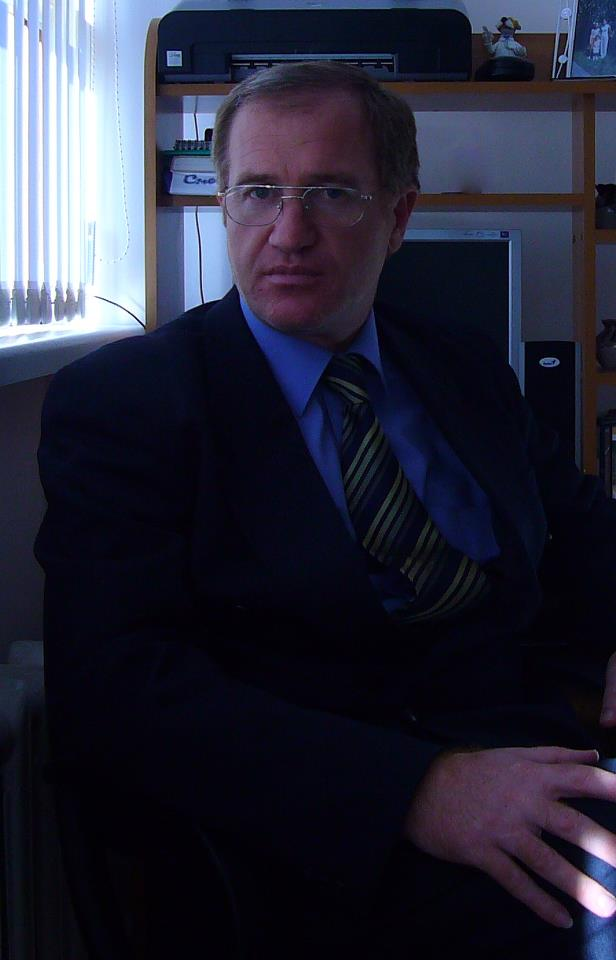

Avtandil Gartskia is the current Minister for Resorts and Tourism of Abkhazia.

== Career ==
On 4 June 2014, following the May 2014 Revolution, Security Council Secretary Nugzar Ashuba and Head of the Presidential Administration Beslan Kubrava resigned, accusing the opposition of carrying out a witch hunt and imposing its decisions on the interim authorities. On 9 June, acting President Valeri Bganba appointed Avtandil Gartskia as acting Security Council Secretary. Gartskia held the post until 28 October, when newly elected President Raul Khajimba appointed Mukhamed Kilba.

Gartskia was appointed as Minister for Resorts and Tourism on 13 March 2015, when President Raul Khajimba carved the Ministry for Resorts and Tourism out of the Ministry for Economy.
