= Zurab Margania =

Chairman of State security of Abkhazia

Zurab Margania is the current Chairman of the State Security Service of Abkhazia. He was appointed on 29 September 2014 by newly elected President Raul Khajimba.
