= Georgian State University of Subtropical Agriculture =

Coordinates: 42.2492°N 42.6893°E

- Established: 1952
- Rector: Roland Kopaliani
- Deputy Rector: Murtazi Svanadze
- Academic staff: 234
- Students: 1,362
- Location: Kutaisi, Georgia
- Head of Administration: Vladimer Ugulava
- Website: http://eng.ssmsu.edu.ge/

The Georgian State University of Subtropical Agriculture was established on 26 January 1952 in Kutaisi, in the country of Georgia.

== History ==
The Agricultural Institute was opened in Kutaisi in 1952. In 1959 it was moved to Sukhumi, Abkhazia, an area with a subtropical climate, and renamed the Georgian Subtropical Agricultural Institute (GSAI). It prepared agronomists, mechanical engineers, and agricultural economists for employment in the subtropical zones of the former USSR. With extensive facilities, the institute served students from all over Europe, Asia, and Africa. After the War in Abkhazia (1992–1993) the university transferred operations back to Kutaisi. In spite of these difficulties the university successfully passed its accreditation process.

In 2002 the facility was renamed the Georgian State University of Subtropical Agriculture (GSSAU).

The university has close scientific and educational contacts with many universities in other countries, including Ukraine, Azerbaijan, Russia and Iran.

== Activities ==
Many scientific investigations have taken place at the university. The faculty of Subtropical Agriculture has produced Dioskuria, a cold-resistant lemon. In the Department of Mechanization a mobile tea picking machine named Sakartvelo was created, which selects and picks tea leaves. The faculty members also create special tools, machines, and apparatus which are necessary for agricultural mechanization in difficult terrain.

In the Department of Technology, professors and teachers are working to improve the quality of Georgian tea. They have created and implemented technologically new methods of processing tea leaves, such as infra-red radiation, high-frequency heating, and processing by ozone.

The characteristics of a tobacco, Samsuni, have been studied and modern technologies were developed for its production.

The university publishes Alioni, its own newspaper.

== Departments ==
The University includes two departments.

- Faculty of Subtropical Agriculture, Economics and Tourism, with its specialties:
  - Agro technology
  - Agro ecology
  - The selection of plants and genetics
  - Forestry and gardening
  - Economics and management of agribusiness
  - Tourism and resort services
- Mechanization of Subtropical Cultures and Technology, with its specialties:
  - Mechanization of agriculture
  - Transport organization in agriculture
  - Service of agricultural technique
  - Food technology
  - Biological technology
  - Food products examination

The university has scientific library with about 23,000 books, and has access to the scientific library at Sokhumi, where there are more than one million volumes.
