= Akhra Pachkoria =

Abkhazian politician

Akhra Pachkoria is the current Chairman of the State Committee for Standards, Consumer and Technical Supervision of Abkhazia. Pachkoria was appointed on 1 November 2016 into the cabinet of newly appointed Prime Minister Beslan Bartsits.
