= Adgur Kakoba =

Abkhazian politician (born 1965)

Adgur Paatovich Kakoba (Abkhaz: Адгәыр Какәаба; Russian: Адгур Паатович Какоба; born 24 November 1965 in Atara) is the current Minister for Education and Science of Abkhazia. Kakoba was appointed on 15 October 2014 by newly elected President Raul Khajimba as Minister for Education, Science, Sports and Youth Policy. The latter two portfolios were transformed into separate State Committees on 30 March 2015.
