= Astamur Tania =

Abkhazian government official

Astamur Tania is a former Head of the Presidential Administration of Abkhazia.

== Career ==
On 4 June 2014, following the May 2014 Revolution, Head of the Presidential Administration Beslan Kubrava and Security Council Secretary Nugzar Ashuba resigned, accusing the opposition of carrying out a witch hunt and imposing its decisions on the interim authorities. On 9 June, acting President Valeri Bganba appointed Astamur Tania as acting Head of the Presidential Administration. Tania was permanently appointed on 29 September 2014 by newly elected President Raul Khajimba.

On 6 May 2016, Khajimba accepted Tania's resignation. On 16 May, Tania was succeeded by Gagra District Head Beslan Bartsits.
