= Valeri Bganba =

Abkhazian politician (born 1953)

- Валерий Бганба
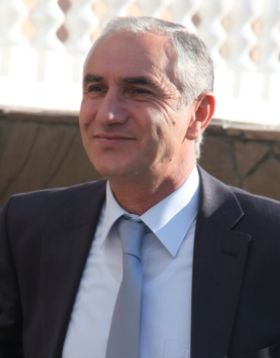
- Bganba in 2012

President of Abkhazia Acting
- In office 13 January 2020 – 23 April 2020
- Prime Minister: Himself
- Preceded by: Raul Khajimba
- Succeeded by: Aslan Bzhania
- In office 1 June 2014 – 25 September 2014
- Prime Minister: Vladimir Delba (Acting)
- Preceded by: Alexander Ankvab
- Succeeded by: Raul Khajimba

13th Prime Minister of Abkhazia
- Acting
- In office 18 November 2024 – 3 March 2025
- President: Badra Gunba
- Preceded by: Alexander Ankvab
- Succeeded by: Vladimir Delba
- In office 18 September 2018 – 23 April 2020
- Preceded by: Daur Arshba (Acting)
- Succeeded by: Alexander Ankvab

Personal details
- Born: 26 August 1953 (age 73) Bzyb, Abkhaz ASSR, Georgian SSR, Soviet Union
- Party: Independent
- Education: Kuban State Agrarian University

Valeri Ramshukhovich Bganba (Russian: Валерий Рамшухович Бганба; born 26 August 1953) is an Abkhazian politician who served as the Prime Minister of Abkhazia from 18 September 2018 to 23 April 2020 and as the acting President of Abkhazia from 13 January to 23 April 2020. Prior to that he was the Speaker of the People's Assembly of Abkhazia from 2012 until 2017. He was elected as speaker on 3 April 2012 and was succeeded by Valery Kvarchia on 12 April 2017. Bganba became acting President on 1 June 2014, following the resignation of Alexander Ankvab as a result of the 2014 Abkhazian political crisis. On 25 September 2014 he was replaced by Raul Khajimba, the winner of the presidential elections on 24 August.

== Early life ==
Valeri Bganba was born on 26 August 1953 in the village of Bzyb in Gagra District. Between 1971 and 1976 he attended the Kuban Agriculture Institute.

== Political career ==
In 1991, Valeri Bganba was elected to Abkhazia's Supreme Soviet. In 1998, and again in 2001, he was elected Chairman of the Gagra District Assembly. In December 2002 Bganba was appointed Governor of the Gagra District, succeeding Grigori Enik, who had been appointed Head of the State Customs Committee. On 25 May 2006, Bganba was released from office by President Sergei Bagapsh upon his own request, and succeeded by Astamur Ketsba.

In March 2007, Bganba once more became a member of the People's Assembly of Abkhazia when in the general election he won a second round victory in constituency no. 9. In the March 2012 elections, he was one of only five deputies to retain their seat, winning a 52.90% first round victory in constituency no.9 over his only opponent. During the first session of the 5th convocation of the People's Assembly on 3 April, Bganba was elected Speaker, defeating Raul Khajimba by 21 votes to 11. Bganba's predecessor as Speaker Nugzar Ashuba had failed to get re-elected.

=== Prime minister ===
He became the Prime Minister of Abkhazia on 18 September 2018.

Following the resignation of Raul Khajimba on 12 January 2020, Bganba was named the acting President on 13 January. Elections for a successor were also scheduled for 22 March.

== See also ==
Political offices
Preceded by Alexander Ankvab; Raul Khajimba	President of Abkhazia; Acting; 2014; 2020	Succeeded by Raul Khajimba; Aslan Bzhania
Preceded by Daur Arshba	Prime Minister of Abkhazia; 2018–2020	Succeeded by Alexander Ankvab
