= President of Abkhazia =

Head of state of the de facto independent republic

President of the Republic of Abkhazia
- Abkhaz: Аԥсны Аҳәынҭқарра Ахада; Russian: Президент Республики Абхазия
- Standard of the president of Abkhazia

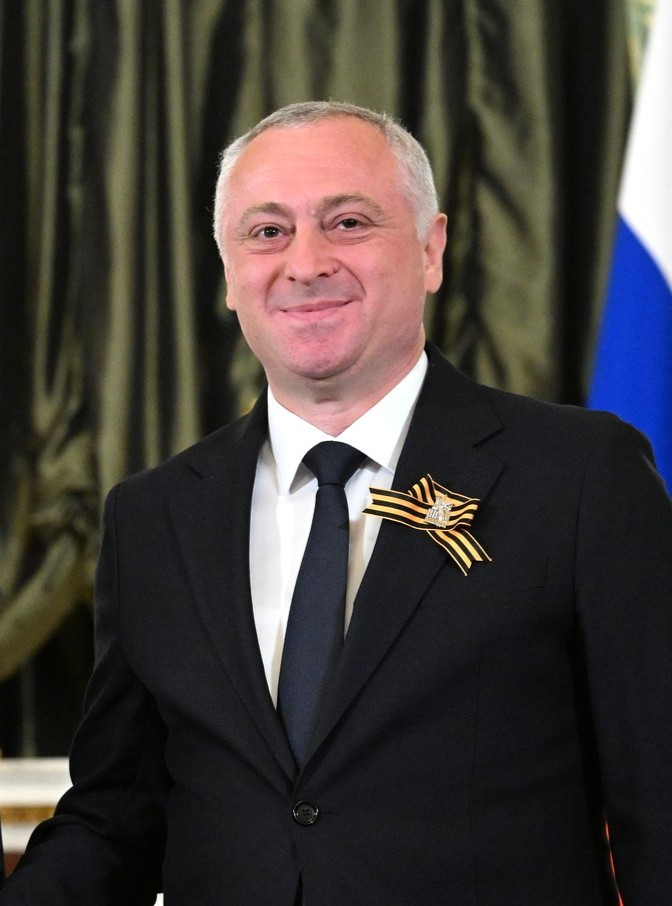
- Incumbent; Badra Gunba since 2 April 2025
- Type: Head of state Head of government Commander-in-chief
- Member of: Cabinet
- Residence: Sukhumi
- Term length: 5 years; Renewable once
- Inaugural holder: Vladislav Ardzinba
- Formation: 26 November 1994; 31 years ago
- Unofficial names: De facto President of Georgia's breakaway Republic of Abkhazia
- Deputy: Vice President of Abkhazia
- Website: presidentofabkhazia.org

The president of Abkhazia (Abkhaz: Аԥсны Аҳәынҭқарра Ахада; Russian: Президент Республики Абхазия) is the head of state and head of government of the partially recognized Republic of Abkhazia, that is de jure part of Georgia. The position was created in 1994. Before the office of president was created the head of state position was known as the chairman of Parliament between 1992 and the creation of the 1994 constitution. Before the position of Chairman of Parliament, the highest office in Abkhazia was the chairman of the Supreme Soviet. The post would last from the declaration of sovereignty from the Georgian Soviet Socialist Republic on 25 August 1990 until the outright declaration of independence on 23 July 1992.

== Oath of office ==
During Alexander Ankvab's presidency, Parliament decided to scrap from the Presidential oath the phrase:

Жәлар рылахь соуааит иҧшьоу абри ахақәкы сацәхьаҵны саныҟала
— If I deviate from this path, then let me be punished by my people

During a meeting on 16 July 2014, following the Abkhazian Revolution, Parliament decided to restore this phrase. According to Vice Speaker Emma Gamisonia, the decision to remove the phrase had been taken because it was perceived as a curse, following the premature death of Abkhazia's first two presidents, Vladislav Ardzinba and Sergei Bagapsh. MP Daur Arshba claimed that the decision had been taken illegally, without the necessary quorum.

On 18 August, the People's Assembly of Abkhazia additionally adopted a bill authored by Said Kharazia and was first proposed by him during the meeting on 16 July, adding the invocation:

Иа Анцәа Ду, суҳәоит Сыԥсадгьыли сыуаажәлари рымаҵ аураҿы амчи алшареи суҭарц!
— Almighty God, give me strength to serve country and people!

== List of officeholders ==
=== Non-presidential heads of state ===
No.	Portrait	Name (Birth–Death)	Position	Term of office			Political party
No.	Portrait	Name (Birth–Death)	Position	Took office	Left office	Time in office	Political party
1		Valerian Kobakhia (1929–1992)	Chairman of the Supreme Soviet	25 August 1990	24 December 1990	121 days	Communist Party of Abkhazia
2		Vladislav Ardzinba (1945–2010)	Chairman of the Supreme Soviet	24 December 1990	23 July 1992	1 year, 212 days	Communist Party of Abkhazia
(2)		Vladislav Ardzinba (1945–2010)	Chairman of Parliament	23 July 1992	26 November 1994	2 years, 126 days	Independent

=== List of presidents of Abkhazia ===
No.	Portrait	Name (Birth–Death)	Term of office			Political party	Election	Vice president(s)
No.	Portrait	Name (Birth–Death)	Took office	Left office	Time in office	Political party	Election	Vice president(s)
1	Vladislav Ardzinba	Vladislav Ardzinba (1945–2010)	26 November 1994	12 February 2005	10 years, 78 days	Independent	1994; 1999	Valery Arshba (1995 – 2005)
2	Sergei Bagapsh	Sergei Bagapsh (1949–2011)	12 February 2005	29 May 2011 †	6 years, 106 days	United Abkhazia	2005; 2009	Raul Khajimba (2005 – 2009); Alexander Ankvab (2009 – 2011)
–	Alexander Ankvab	Alexander Ankvab (born 1952); Acting	29 May 2011	26 September 2011	120 days	Aitaira	–	–
3	Alexander Ankvab	Alexander Ankvab (born 1952)	26 September 2011	1 June 2014 (Resigned)	2 years, 248 days	Aitaira	2011	Mikhail Logua (2011 – 2013)
–	Valeri Bganba	Valeri Bganba (born 1953); Acting	1 June 2014	25 September 2014	116 days	Independent	–	–
4	Raul Khajimba	Raul Khajimba (born 1958)	25 September 2014	12 January 2020 (Resigned)	5 years, 109 days	FNUA	2014; 2019	Vitali Gabnia (2014 – 2018); Aslan Bartsits (2019 – 2020)
–	Valeri Bganba	Valeri Bganba (born 1953); Acting	13 January 2020	23 April 2020	101 days	Independent	–	–
5	Aslan Bzhania	Aslan Bzhania (born 1963)	23 April 2020	19 November 2024 (Resigned)	4 years, 210 days	Independent	2020	Badra Gunba (2020 – 2025)
–	Badra Gunba	Badra Gunba (born 1981); Acting	19 November 2024	2 April 2025	134 days	Independent	–	–
6	Badra Gunba	Badra Gunba (born 1981)	2 April 2025	Incumbent	1 year, 214 days	Independent	2025	Beslan Bigvava (since 2025)

== Latest election ==
Candidate	Running mate	Party	First round		Second round	
Candidate	Running mate	Party	Votes	%	Votes	%
Badra Gunba	Beslan Bigvava	Independent	45,817	47.76	54,954	55.66
Adgur Ardzinba	Alkhas Djindjal	Abkhaz People's Movement	36,476	38.03	41,708	42.25
Robert Arshba	Daut Agrba	Independent	7,434	7.75		
Oleg Bartsits	Adgur Kakoba	Independent	3,988	4.16		
Adgur Khurkhumal	Tengiz Kutelia	Independent	896	0.93		
Against all			1,313	1.37	2,065	2.09
Total			95,924	100.00	98,727	100.00
Valid votes			95,924	97.17	98,727	98.32
Invalid/blank votes			2,798	2.83	1,687	1.68
Total votes			98,722	100.00	100,414	100.00
Registered voters/turnout			143,960	68.58	143,651	69.90
Source: Central Election Commission

== See also ==
- Government of the Republic of Abkhazia
- Prime Minister of Abkhazia
- Minister for Foreign Affairs of Abkhazia
