= Abkhazian Revolution =

2014 revolution in Abkhazia

- Date: May 27, 2014 – June 1, 2014 (4 days)
- Location: Abkhazia (Note: The political status of Abkhazia is disputed. Having unilaterally declared independence from Georgia in 1992, Abkhazia is formally recognised as an independent state by 5 UN member states (two other states previously recognised it but then withdrew their recognition), while the remainder of the international community recognizes it as de jure Georgian territory. Georgia continues to claim the area as its own territory, designating it as Russian-occupied territory.)
- Caused by: Abkhazian nationalism; Lack of economic reforms; Ethnic Georgians getting Abkhazian citizenship and passports; Russians looking into buying Abkhazian property under new security alliance
- Result: Resignation of Aleksandr Ankvab; Valeri Bganba becomes acting president of Abkhazia; Early presidential elections

The Abkhazian Revolution took place in 2014, when President Aleksandr Ankvab resigned after hundreds of demonstrators stormed his office. After mass protests in the capital Sukhumi and the occupation of his office on 27 May, Ankvab fled to his hometown of Gudauta and ultimately resigned on 1 June, after previously denouncing the demonstration as an attempted coup d'état.

The uprising was attributed to public anger with Ankvab over his perceived liberal policy toward ethnic Georgians in Abkhazia, a breakaway republic with limited recognition. Although Abkhazia seceded from Georgia in 1992, the Ankvab government allowed ethnic Georgians to register as voters and receive Abkhazian passports.

The revolution led to an early presidential election being called in August 2014. Opposition leader Raul Khajimba was elected president with a narrow majority of the vote.

== Background ==
In May 2011, Sergei Bagapsh died in office, leading to the 2011 presidential election. Alexander Ankvab won with 54.9% of the votes.

In late April 2014, the opposition submitted a 5 May ultimatum to President Ankvab to dismiss the government and make radical reforms.

== Timeline until Alexander Ankvab's resignation ==
- May 27: In the centre of Sukhumi 10,000 supporters of the Abkhaz opposition gathered. On the same day, President Aleksandr Ankvab's headquarters in Sukhumi were stormed by opposition groups led by Raul Khadjimba, forcing him into flight to Gudauta. The opposition claimed that the protests were sparked by poverty, but the main point of contention was President Ankvab's liberal policy towards ethnic Georgians in the Gali region. The opposition said these policies could endanger Abkhazia's ethnic Abkhazian identity. Georgia's Ministry of Foreign Affairs called on the international community to act in response to the political unrest in Abkhazia. (See Issue of ethnic Georgians)
- May 28: During the night, Russia's Deputy Security Council Secretary Rashid Nurgaliyev met with Ankvab, who described the events as an "armed coup attempt." It was also reported that Ankvab met with Putin's aide Vladislav Surkov, who had traveled to Sukhumi with Nurgaliyev. On May 28 Surkov also met with opposition leaders Raul Khajimba, Sergei Shamba, Akhra Bzhaniya, and Vitaly Gabniy, as well as with the lawmakers of Abkhazia's parliament. On May 30 media reported that Ankvab moved to Russian Federation military base in Gudauta due to security concerns.
- May 31: The Abkhaz parliament appointed speaker of the parliament Valeri Bganba as an acting president. It also decided to hold an early presidential election on August 24. The resolution said that the document was adopted "in connection with Alexander Ankvab's inability to exercise the powers and responsibilities of the President of the Republic of Abkhazia..." President Ankvab slammed parliament for urging him to step down and for a vote of no confidence in the Cabinet.
- June 1: Ankvab resigned "with the goal of preserving stability in the country". Demonstrators started celebrating in the streets of Sukhumi. Acting president Valeri Bgangba stated that his main task now would be to hold a successful early presidential election. Ankvab stated that he will run in the election.

== Timeline after Alexander Ankvab's resignation ==
- June 2: With his first presidential decree, Bganba accepted Prime Minister Leonid Lakerbaia's resignation (submitted earlier on the same day), appointed Vice Premier Vladimir Delba as acting prime minister, and dismissed the Cabinet, requesting its members to continue performing their duties in an acting fashion until the election and the appointment of a new Cabinet. In accordance with the original demands of the protesters, Bganba also dismissed Timur Gogua and Beslan Arshba as heads of the Tkvarcheli and Gali Districts, respectively, and proposed to Parliament to dismiss Safarbei Mikanba as Prosecutor General.
- June 3: Acting president Valeri Bgangba stated that his main task now would be to hold a successful early presidential election. Ankvab stated that he will run in the election.

Chairman of the Central Election Committee Batal Tabagua announced that the committee had begun preparations for the presidential election set for 24 August, that candidates could be nominated between 25 June and 14 July and that parties registered less than five months before the election date would not be eligible to nominate candidates.
Valeri Bganba dismissed Indira Vardania as First Vice Premier, Beslan Arshba as Vice Premier (upon his own request) and Murman Jopua as head of the Ochamchira District (upon his own request).

- June 4: Head of the Presidential Administration Beslan Kubrava and Security Council Secretary Nugzar Ashuba resigned, accusing the opposition of carrying out a witch hunt and imposing its decisions on the interim authorities.
- June 5: The People's Assembly voted to dismiss Saferbei Mikanba as Prosecutor General.
- June 6: Bganba appointed Deputy Prosecutor General Zurab Agumava as Acting Prosecutor General and Zurab Margania as First Deputy Head of the State Security Service.
- June 9: Bganba appointed Astamur Tania as acting head of the Presidential Administration and Avtandil Gartskia as acting Security Council Secretary. Raul Lolua, head of the State Security Service's Special Forces Centre, appointed First Deputy Minister of Internal Affairs to carry out the duties of Otar Khetsia, who was (put) on paid leave. (Bganba would formally dismiss Khetsia and appoint Lolua as Acting Minister on 4 August.)
- June 13: Bganba appointed Beslan Butba as acting vice premier.

== Subsequent events ==
On 27 June 2016, following a request by the opposition, the Prosecutor's Office published its assessment of the events surrounding Ankvab's resignation, and declared that it found no criminal actions to investigate. On 30 June, opposition leaders criticised the prosecutor office's analysis, in particular its claim that Ankvab's succession had been resolved in accordance with the Constitution of Abkhazia, and announced they would challenge the decision in Supreme Court.

== See also ==
- Abkhaz–Georgian conflict
- List of protests in the 21st century
