= Constitution of Abkhazia =

The Constitution of the Republic of Abkhazia (Russian: Конститу́ция Респу́блики Абха́зия) was adopted by the Supreme Council of the Republic of Abkhazia of the 12th convocation on 26 November 1994, and by the national referendum on 3 October 1999, with an amendment adopted by the national referendum on the same day. On the 15th anniversary of its adoption, a special meeting was held between the current convocation of the People's Assembly and many of the members who were present in 1994. Sergei Shamba reported that he had written down the exact time of adoption as 17:14.

== Structure ==
The constitution consists of seven chapters.

1. Principles of the Constitutional System
2. Human Rights and Freedoms of a Citizen
3. Legislative Power
4. Executive Power
5. Judicial Power
6. Local Government
7. Constitutional Amendments and Revision Procedure
