= Alexander Ankvab =

Abkhaz politician

- Алеқсандр Анқәаб (Abkhaz); ალექსანდრე ანქვაბი (Georgian); Александр Анкваб (Russian)
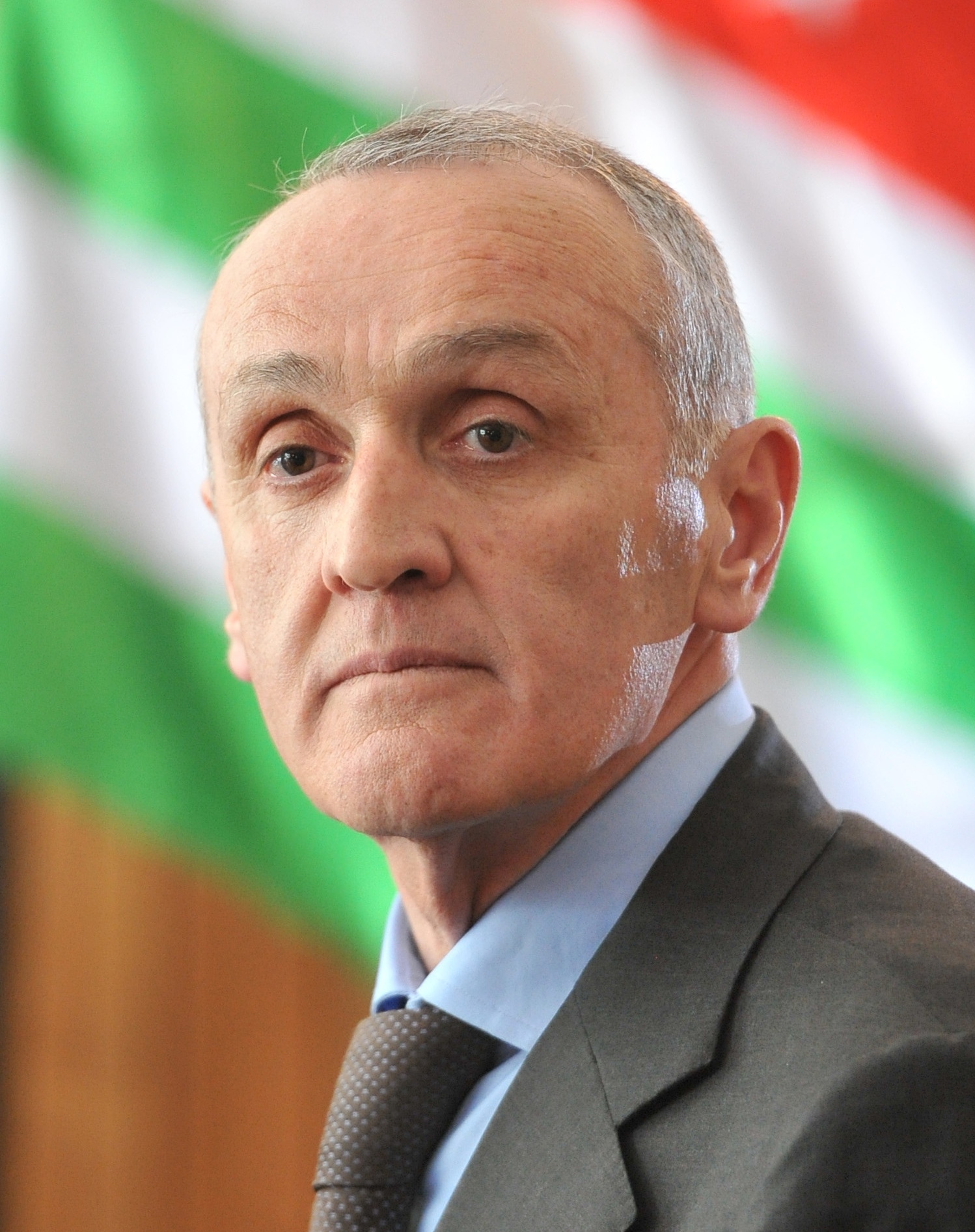
- Ankvab in 2011

Prime Minister of Abkhazia
- In office 23 April 2020 – 18 November 2024
- President: Aslan Bzhania
- Preceded by: Valeri Bganba
- Succeeded by: Valeri Bganba (acting)
- In office 14 February 2005 – 13 February 2010
- President: Sergei Bagapsh
- Preceded by: Nodar Khashba
- Succeeded by: Sergei Shamba

3rd President of Abkhazia
- In office 29 May 2011 – 1 June 2014; Acting: until 26 September 2011
- Vice President: Mikhail Logua
- Preceded by: Sergei Bagapsh
- Succeeded by: Valeri Bganba (Acting)

Vice President of Abkhazia
- In office 12 February 2010 – 29 May 2011
- President: Sergei Bagapsh
- Preceded by: Raul Khajimba
- Succeeded by: Mikhail Logua

Minister for Internal Affairs of Abkhazia
- In office 24 June 1992 – 1993
- Preceded by: Givi Lominadze
- Succeeded by: Givi Agrba

Personal details
- Born: 26 December 1952 (age 73) Sukhumi, Abkhazian ASSR, Georgian SSR, Soviet Union
- Party: Aitaira
- Education: Rostov State University

Aleksandr Zolotinskovich Ankvab (/ˈɑːŋkvɑːb/ AHNK-vahb; Abkhaz: Алықьсандр Золотинска-иԥа Анқәаб, romanized: Alyk'sandr Zolotinska-ipa Anq'ab; Georgian: ალექსანდრე ზოლოტინსკის ძე ანქვაბი, romanized: aleksandre zolot'insk'is dze ankvabi; Russian: Алекса́ндр Золоти́нскович Анква́б; born 26 December 1952) is an Abkhaz politician and businessman who was the president of Abkhazia from 29 May 2011 until his resignation on 1 June 2014. He previously served as prime minister from 2005 to 2010 and as vice-president from 2010 to 2011 during the presidency of Sergei Bagapsh. He was appointed prime minister again on 23 April 2020 and resigned following the 2024 Abkhazian protests.

In the 2004 Abkhazian presidential election, Ankvab supported Bagapsh's candidacy following his own exclusion by the Central Election Commission; he was subsequently appointed as prime minister by Bagapsh in February 2005. Ankvab was appointed acting president of Abkhazia after president Bagapsh underwent an operation on 21 May 2011. Following the operation, Bagapsh died on 29 May 2011 and Ankvab served as acting president until winning election in his own right later in 2011.

Ankvab survived six attempts on his life from 2005 to 2012, last time as a president on 22 February 2012, when his convoy was ambushed in Abkhazia, killing two of his guards.

On 27 May 2014, Ankvab's headquarters in Sukhumi were stormed by opposition groups led by Raul Khajimba, forcing him into flight to Gudauta in what Ankvab denounced as an "armed coup attempt". The Abkhaz parliament declared Ankvab "unable" to exercise his presidential powers on 31 May 2014, and Ankvab resigned the next day.

== Early life and career ==
Born in the Abkhazian capital Sukhumi, Ankvab graduated with a degree in law from the Rostov State University in southern Russia and worked in the Komsomol, the Justice Ministry of the Abkhaz ASSR, and the Interior Ministry of the Georgian Soviet Socialist Republic until his resignation in 1990.

He was elected to the Abkhazian Supreme Soviet in 1991. He was appointed interior minister of Abkhazia's separatist government during the 1992–1993 conflict with the Georgian central government. Following the Abkhaz victory, he moved to Moscow in 1994 and became a successful businessman.

== 2004 presidential election ==
Ankvab returned to Abkhazian politics in 2000, setting up the movement Aitaira ("Revival") in opposition to the government of president Vladislav Ardzinba. In 2004 he announced that he would run for president, but was disqualified as ineligible on the grounds that he could not speak Abkhaz (a requirement for public office in the republic) and had lived in Abkhazia for too short a time. Ankvab decided to support Bagapsh instead and was crucial to the latter's electoral success. His appointment as prime minister was widely predicted.

== 2009 presidential election ==
Ankvab was Sergei Bagapsh's vice presidential candidate in the 12 December 2009 presidential election. As required by law, Ankvab was therefore officially suspended from his post on 11 November, his duties to be carried out by First Vice Premier Leonid Lakerbaia. Bagapsh and Ankvab won the election, and they were sworn in on 12 February 2010. The following day, Ankvab was succeeded as prime minister by Foreign Minister Sergei Shamba.

== 2011 presidential election ==
After Bagapsh's unexpected death after lung surgery, Ankvab became an acting president. He was nominated for presidency by an initiative group for a snap presidential elections held in the region on 26 August 2011. During the election campaign, on 15 August, supporters of Ankvab's opponent Sergei Shamba organised an outdoor screening of a video interview of Moscow-based retired Georgian general Tengiz Kitovani, a Georgian commander during the 1990s war in Abkhazia, in which he claimed that Ankvab had cooperated with the Georgian intelligence service during the conflict. Ankvab accused Shamba of resorting to black PR, while Shamba's campaign team issued a statement calling on the prosecutor's office to investigate Ankvab's war-time activities. According to the preliminary results Ankvab garnered up to 55% of votes, defeating Shamba and ex-vice president and opposition candidate Raul Khajimba.

== Assassination attempts ==
Alexander Ankvab has survived six assassination attempts since becoming prime minister in February 2005: in February and April 2005, in June and July 2007, in September 2010 and most recently in February 2012. The last assassination attempt killed two of Ankvab's security guards, he himself was injured in the two previous attacks. Only after the February 2012 assassination attempt were arrests made. Former Interior Minister Almasbei Kchach was one of two suspects who subsequently committed suicide. One man was subsequently indicted and arrested for the July 2007 attack.

== Ouster ==
On 27 May 2014, thousands of protesters, led by Raul Khajimba, rallied against Ankvab in Sukhumi, accusing him of "authoritarian" rule, inappropriate spending of Russian aid funds, and of failure to tackle corruption and economic problems, and demanded his resignation. One of the other issues that sparked the rebellion was Ankvab's relatively liberal citizenship policy (he allowed ethnic Georgians to register as voters and receive Abkhazian passports). Within hours, the protesters stormed the presidential headquarters and forced Ankvab to flee Sukhumi to a Russian military base in Gudauta. Ankvab denounced the events in Sukhumi as an "armed coup attempt" and refused to resign. The Russian government dispatched Vladimir Putin's aide Vladislav Surkov to mediate between the opposition and Ankvab's government. On 31 May, the Parliament of Abkhazia declared Ankvab "unable" to perform his presidential duties, appointed the parliamentary chairman Valery Bganba as an interim president and called snap presidential election for 24 August. On 1 June 2014, Ankvab stepped down as president.

== Prime minister (2020-2024) ==
On 24 April 2024, Ankvab was appointed prime minister of Abkhazia by president Aslan Bzhania following the resignation of Valery Bganba. He resigned alongside Bzhania on 19 November 2024 following anti-government protests against an investment agreement with Russia.

Political offices
Preceded by Nodar Khashba; Valeri Bganba	Prime Minister of Abkhazia; 2005–2010; 2020–	Succeeded by Sergei Shamba; Incumbent
Preceded by Raul Khadjimba	Vice President of Abkhazia; 2010–2011	Succeeded by Mikhail Logua
Preceded by Sergei Bagapsh	President of Abkhazia; 2011–2014	Succeeded by Valery Bganba; Acting
