= Artur Mikvabia =

Abkhazian economist and politician

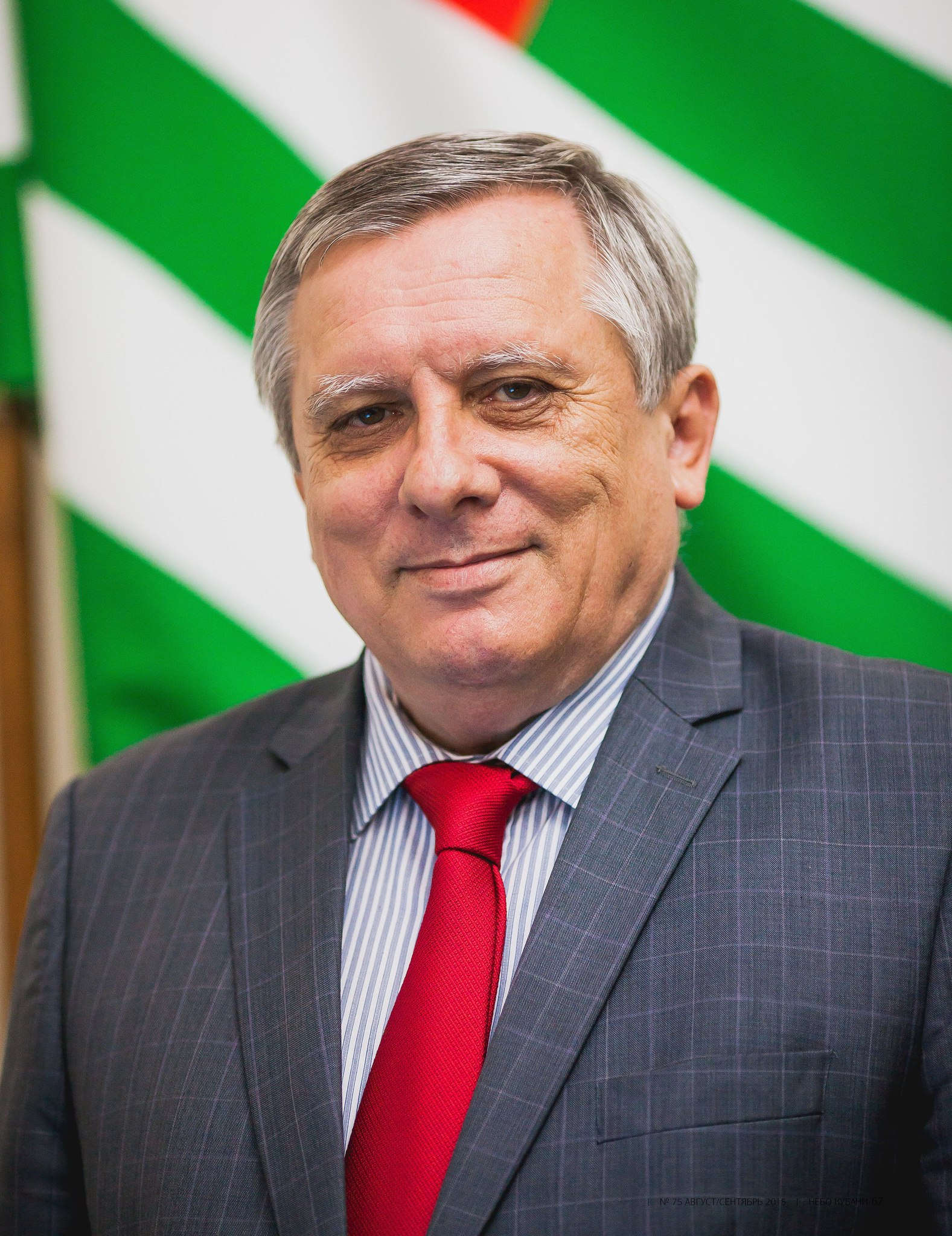

Prime Minister of Abkhazia
- In office 20 March 2015 – 26 July 2016
- President: Raul Khajimba
- Preceded by: Beslan Butba
- Succeeded by: Beslan Bartsits

Leader of United Abkhazia
- In office 25 March 2004 – 27 January 2009
- Preceded by: Position established
- Succeeded by: Daur Tarba

Personal details
- Born: 22 May 1949 (age 77) Sukhumi, Abkhaz ASSR, Georgian SSR
- Party: United Abkhazia

Artur Mikvabia (Abkhaz: Артур Артиом-иԥа Амқәаб; Georgian: არტურ მიქვაბია; born 22 May 1949) is an economist and politician from Abkhazia. He was Prime Minister in the Government of President Khajimba between 20 March 2015 and 26 July 2016.

== Chairman of United Abkhazia (2004–2009) ==
Artur Mikvabia became Chairman of United Abkhazia when it was founded as a socio-political movement on 25 March 2004. On 25 July 2007, he announced that he would resign his post and retire from politics, but members stated that they would not accept this, and Mikvabia remained chairman. On 27 January 2009 United Abkhazia was transformed into a political party and Daur Tarba became the new chairman.

== Prime Minister (2015–2016) ==
Mikvabia was appointed prime minister by Khajimba on 20 March 2015. Following a pending motion of no-confidence against him, the storming of the Interior Ministry by opposition activists and a failed referendum to bring about an early presidential election, Mikvabia announced his resignation on 26 July 2016, accepted on the same day by Khajimba. In an interview with Caucasian Knot, Mikvabia stated that the strong unrest in society was being caused by the government's efforts to structurally improve the financial situation of Abkhazia through measures such as the introduction of VAT, that he did not want to work under conditions where society itself hindered development and that he hoped his resignation would defuse tensions.

Political offices
Preceded by Beslan Butba	Prime Minister of Abkhazia; 2015–2016	Succeeded by Beslan Bartsits
