= Sergei Bagapsh =

President of Abkhazia from 2005 to 2011

- Сергеи Багаԥшь სერგეი ბაგაფში
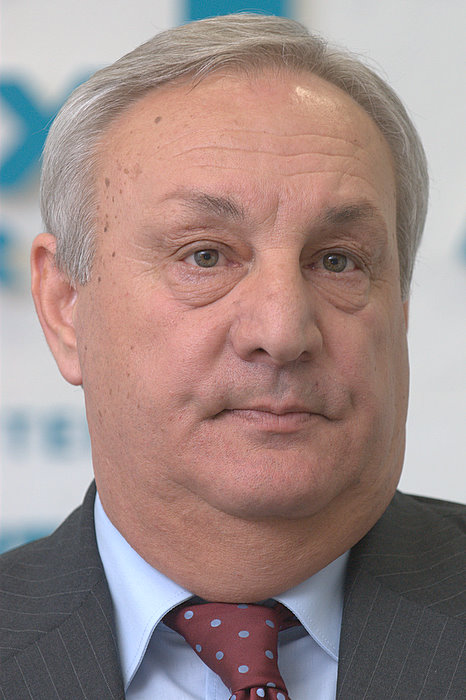
- Bagapsh in 2008

2nd President of Abkhazia
- In office 12 February 2005 – 29 May 2011
- Prime Minister: Nodar Khashba; Alexander Ankvab; Sergei Shamba
- Vice President: Raul Khajimba; Alexander Ankvab
- Preceded by: Vladislav Ardzinba
- Succeeded by: Alexander Ankvab

2nd Prime Minister of Abkhazia
- In office 29 April 1997 – 20 December 1999
- President: Vladislav Ardzinba
- Preceded by: Gennady Gagulia
- Succeeded by: Viacheslav Tsugba

Personal details
- Born: 4 March 1949 Sukhumi, Abkhaz ASSR, Georgian SSR, Soviet Union
- Died: 29 May 2011 (aged 62) Moscow, Russia
- Party: United Abkhazia
- Spouse: Marina Shonia
- Education: Georgian State University of Subtropical Agriculture

Sergei Uasyl-ipa Bagapsh (Note: Abkhaz: Сергеи Уасыл-иԥа Багаԥшь, Georgian: სერგეი ბაგაფში, Russian: Сергей Васильевич Багапш, romanized: Sergey Vasilyevich Bagapsh) (4 March 1949 – 29 May 2011) was an Abkhaz politician who served as the second president of Abkhazia from 12 February 2005 until his death on 29 May 2011. He previously served as Prime Minister of Abkhazia from 1997 to 1999. He was re-elected in the 2009 presidential election. Bagapsh's term as prime minister included the 1998 war with Georgia, while he oversaw both the recognition of Abkhazia by Russia and the Russo-Georgian War during his presidency.

== Early life and career ==
Sergei Bagapsh was born on 4 March 1949 at Sukhumi in the Georgian SSR. Throughout most of his life, he had lived in Abkhazia. In his youth, Bagapsh was a member of the Georgian basketball team. Bagapsh graduated from the Georgian State University of Subtropical Agriculture in Sukhumi. During his studies he worked first, in a wine cooperative and later as a security guard for the state bank. In 1972, he fulfilled his military service, worked as the head of a sovkhoz following which he became instructor with the Abkhazian regional committee of the Komsomol.

In 1978, Bagapsh became responsible for information in the central committee of the Komsomol's Georgian branch and in 1980, first secretary of the Abkhazian Regional Committee. In 1982, Sergei Bagapsh became secretary general of the Communist Party in the Ochamchira District. After the fall of communism, Bagapsh became a businessman and the representative of the Abkhazian government in Moscow.

== Political career ==
Bagapsh was named first deputy chairman in 1993, and then served as First Deputy Prime Minister of Abkhazia from 1995 to 1997. On 9 November 1995, Bagapsh was seriously wounded in an attack.

Bagapsh became Prime Minister of Abkhazia in 1997. Georgian-Abkhazian tensions rose during Bagapsh's term in office, reaching a height in May 1998, following attacks by Georgian insurgents on peacekeeping forces from the Commonwealth of Independent States. Subsequently, a military conflict erupted between CIS and Georgian insurgent forces. In the subsequent war, sometimes referred to as the "Six-Day War", Abkhazian forces eliminated the insurgents, and 30,000 Georgian civilians fled Abkhazia.

== 2004 presidential election ==
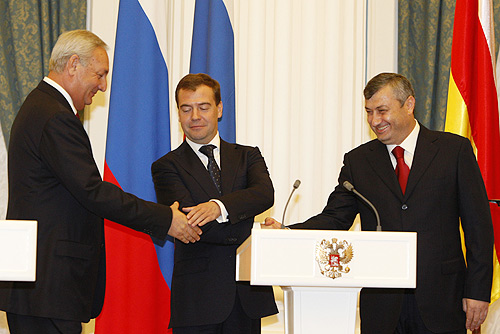
Bagapsh (on left) shaking hands with Dmitry Medvedev and Eduard Kokoity in September 2008 following Russia's recognition of Abkhazia

From 2000 until 2004, Sergei Bagapsh was the managing director of the Abkhazian state-owned power company Chernomorenergo. During the same period, he began to emerge as a likely opposition candidate in the lead-up to the 2004 presidential election. In early 2004, he became one of three leaders of the newly founded opposition party, United Abkhazia, which had been founded in opposition to then-President Vladislav Ardzinba. On 20 July 2004, United Abkhazia joined forces with Amtsakhara, another important opposition party, and the two parties named him as their joint candidate for the coming October presidential elections, beating out other hopefuls, such as former foreign minister Sergey Shamba.

Bagapsh and his main opponent, Raul Khajimba, disputed the election result. The Abkhaz Electoral Commission originally declared Khajimba to be the winner, with Bagapsh a distant second, but the Supreme Court later found that Bagapsh had actually won with 50.3% of the vote. The court reversed its decision when Khajimba's supporters stormed the court building. At one point, Bagapsh and his supporters threatened to hold their own inauguration on 6 December 2004. However, in early December, Bagapsh and Khajimba reached an agreement to run together on a national unity ticket. New elections were held on 12 January 2005, with this ticket easily winning. Under the agreement, Bagapsh ran for president and Khajimba for vice-president.

Following Bagapsh's election, Russia placed an imports ban on Abkhazia, leading to several shipments of tangerines destined for Russian markets rotting at the border. The presidential election and subsequent political crisis was termed by some, including the BBC, as the "Tangerine Revolution", both as a reference to the Rose Revolution in Georgia the year prior and Abkhazia's tangerines.

== Recognition of Abkhazia by Russia ==
In August 2008, the Russo-Georgian War began following the 2008 Russo-Georgian diplomatic crisis. Following the war, Abkhazia gained control over the Kodori Valley, as well as recognition by Russia, Venezuela, and Nicaragua. Following Russia's recognition of Abkhaz independence, Russian businesses began to invest extensively within the country, particularly in real estate, infrastructure, and energy. Pressure began mounting on Bagapsh from Russian sources to hasten economic privatisation in preparation for the 2014 Winter Olympics, while Abkhazian political opponents accused him of selling off Abkhazian assets.

== 2009 Presidential election ==
Bagapsh first addressed the matter of his candidacy in the 12 December 2009 presidential election when, during a press conference in Moscow on 18 April 2009, he announced that he would probably make use of his constitutional right to run for a second term. Bagapsh was nominated on 27 October by United Abkhazia, with Prime Minister Alexander Ankvab of Aitaira as his vice presidential candidate. On 18 November, Bagapsh received the additional support of the Communist Party of Abkhazia.

== Death ==
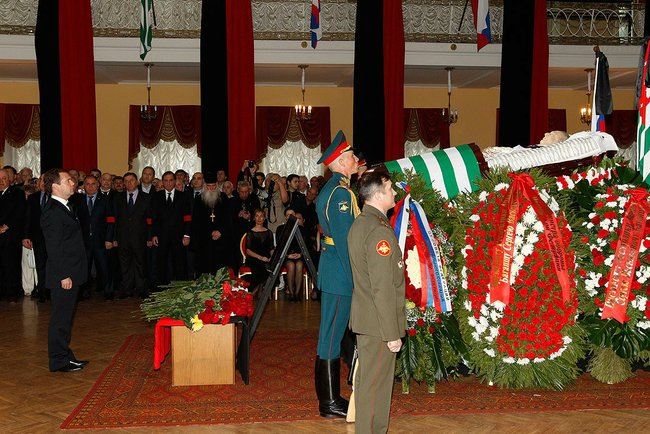
Russian president Dmitry Medvedev pays his respects to Bagapsh at a service in Moscow on 30 May 2011.

In May 2011, cancerous growths were discovered on Bagapsh's lung. On 21 May, Bagapsh underwent surgery in a Moscow clinic. Though the growths were successfully removed, Bagapsh died on 29 May due to heart failure that resulted from what was described as "complications" from the surgery. After the surgery, doctors discovered he had cancer. Alexander Ankvab took over as acting president with an election scheduled to be held on 26 August.

=== Reactions ===
Abkhaz parliament speaker Nugzar Ashuba told Russian state television that, although the death was completely unexpected, the situation remains calm.

Russian president Dmitry Medvedev offered his condolences saying: "Bagapsh was a loyal supporter of friendship and alliance with Russia, and he tirelessly worked to deepen close bilateral ties between our countries."

== Legacy ==
A state commission was installed to perpetuate the memory of Sergei Bagapsh. On 26 January 2012, the City Council of Sukhumi unanimously accepted a proposal by Mayor Alias Labakhua to rename the Square of the Constitution of the USSR after Bagapsh.

== See also ==
- Bagapsh Government

== Notes ==
Political offices
Preceded by Gennady Gagulia	Prime Minister of Abkhazia; 1997–1999	Succeeded by Vyacheslav Tsugba
Preceded by Vladislav Ardzinba	President of Abkhazia; 2005–2011	Succeeded by Alexander Ankvab
