= Beslan Butba =

Member of the People's Assembly of Abkhazia

- Беслан Быҭәба; Беслан Бутба

Prime Minister of Abkhazia
- In office 29 September 2014 – 16 March 2015
- President: Raul Khajimba
- Preceded by: Vladimir Delba (Acting); Leonid Lakerbaia
- Succeeded by: Shamil Adzynba (Acting); Artur Mikvabia

Chairman of the Party for the Economic Development of Abkhazia
- Incumbent
- Assumed office 26 September 2007
- Deputy: Beslan Baratelia
- Preceded by: Position established

Personal details
- Born: 7 February 1960 (age 66) Chlou, Soviet Union
- Party: Party for the Economic; Development of Abkhazia
- Education: Moscow State; Construction University; Interdisciplinary Centre of Ergonomic Research and Development

Beslan Butba (Abkhaz: Беслан Быҭәба; Russian: Беслан Бутба; Georgian: ბესლან ბუთბა; born February 7, 1960) is a businessman and a former Prime Minister of Abkhazia. He owns Abkhazia's only private television station Abaza TV and is the chairman of the Party of the Economic Development of Abkhazia. Butba was an unsuccessful candidate in the December 2009 presidential election.

== Early life and education ==
Beslan Butba was born on 7 February 1960 in the village of Chlou in the Ochamchira District of the Abkhazian ASSR. In 1983 he graduated from the Institute for Engineering and Construction in Moscow.

In 2009, Butba obtained his Candidate of Sciences degree in Moscow, and in March 2011, his Doctor of Sciences degree in Tula at the Russian Interdisciplinary Centre for Ergonomic Research and Development.

== Business career ==
After graduation in 1983, Butba began working for the Repair and Construction Department No. 1 of Moscow. Three years later he became head of the department. Butba first entered business when in 1989 he founded a cooperation in Moscow. He returned to Abkhazia in 1990 where he also started to do business. In 2005 he became head of the Business Club Sukhum. In 2007 he founded Abaza TV, Abkhazia's first private Television channel, which started broadcasting at 19:30 on 26 June 2007. Butba also owns the newspaper Ekho Abkhazii.

== Political career ==
=== Member of Parliament (2002 – 2007) ===
Beslan Butba was a member of the People's Assembly of Abkhazia from 2002 until 2007, and he headed the Committee for Interparliamentary Relations. In 2007, he failed to be re-elected. He then founded and became Chairman of the Party of the Economic Development of Abkhazia, which held its first congress on 26 September 2007.

=== 2009 Presidential election ===
On 23 October 2009 Butba was nominated by his party for the December 2009 presidential election, running together with former Interior Minister Almasbei Kchach as vice presidential candidate. The pair came in fourth place with 8.25% of the vote share.

=== Member of Parliament (2012 – 2014) ===
In 2012, Besla Butba was again elected to Parliament for constituency no. 26 in his native Chlou, in a by-election organised after the sudden death of newly elected deputy Temur Logua. He was nominated by an initiative group on 12 June. In the first round on 22 July 2012, Butba won a plurality of 920 votes out of 2040. In the second round on 5 August, Butba defeated Beslan Tarba by winning 1125 out of 2193 votes.

On 1 February 2013, Butba was appointed Special Representative of the President for cooperation with the countries of South and Middle America.

=== Prime Minister (2014 – 2015) ===
Following the 2014 Abkhazian political crisis and the resignation of President Alexander Ankvab and several other officials, including Vice Premier Beslan Eshba, Butba was appointed as acting Vice Premier on 13 June. Accordingly, Butba's membership of Parliament was terminated on 18 June.

During the election to succeed Ankvab as President, Butba campaigned with opposition leader Raul Khajimba as his Prime Ministerial candidate. Khajimba won a narrow first-round victory and Butba was appointed as Prime Minister on 29 September.

In November 2014, Butba, driving his car without security guards, was attacked and beaten by two drunken men, who were later detained and brought to police for questioning. Butba was briefly hospitalized in a Sukhumi hospital and treated for concussion.

There were rumors of Butba's resignation almost since the beginning of his term, explained variously by a power struggle between Butba and Khajimba and by Butba's supposed bad performance as Prime Minister. Butba was finally dismissed by President Khajimba on 16 March 2015, and temporarily replaced by First Vice Premier Shamil Adzynba. In a press conference afterwards, Butba said that he had made Khajimba aware of his intention to resign. He claimed that the Presidential Administration had taken over many of the responsibilities of the Prime Minister, creating a 'second government'.

=== Plenipotentary Representative of the President (since 2015) ===
On 21 April 2015, Butba was appointed Plenipotentary Representative of the President of Abkhazia for Trade and Economic Cooperation with Foreign Countries, with the rank of Vice Premier.

In the night of 8 April 2016, Butba's car was burned down in front of his house. Butba was in Moscow at the time but his family was at home.

== See also ==
Political offices
Preceded by Vladimir Delba; Acting	Prime Minister of Abkhazia; 2014–2015	Succeeded by Shamil Adzynba; Acting
