= Abkhazian State University =

University in Sukhumi, Abkhazia, Georgia

- Аԥснытәи Аҳәынҭқарратә Университет; Абхазский государственный университет
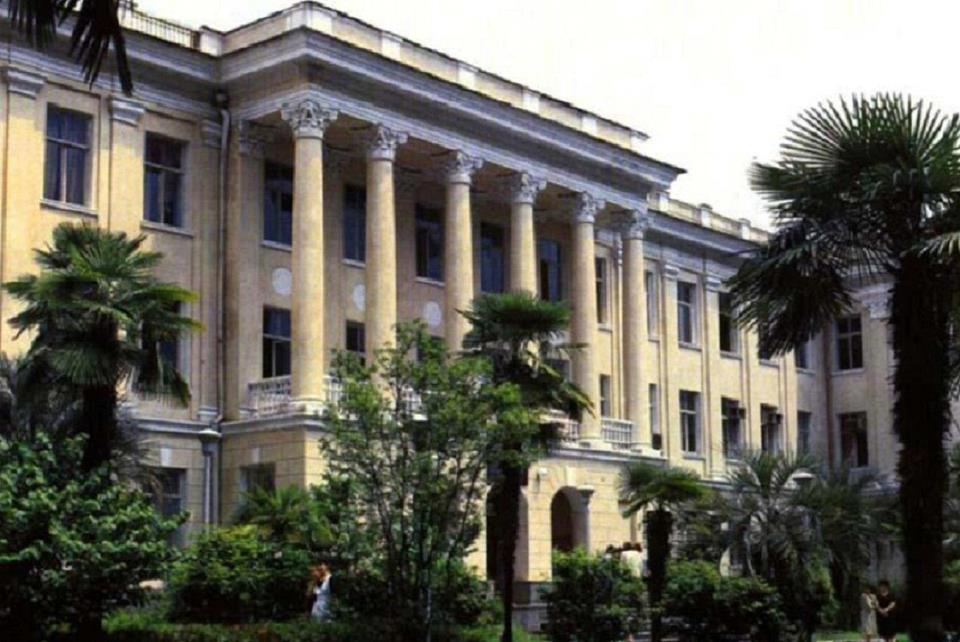
- Type: Public
- Established: 1979
- Rector: Aleko Gvaramia
- Location: Sukhumi, Abkhazia, Georgia; 42°58′34″N 41°03′59″E
- Website: http://agu.site/

The Abkhazian State University is the only university in Abkhazia. It was founded in 1979 on the basis of the Sukhumi Pedagogical Institute. Its first rector was Zurab Anchabadze. The study language is mainly Russian in the university.

The university consists the departments of physics and mathematics, biology and geography, history, philology, economics, law; pedagogical and agro-engineering departments.

The first college in Abkhazia, the Sukhumi Agro-pedagogical Institute was founded in 1932 and transformed into the Maxim Gorky Pedagogical Institute the following year. Following the rallies and street demonstrations in 1978 it was transformed into Abkhazian State University with Abkhaz, Georgian and Russian sections. In 1989 Georgian students demanded that the Georgian sector be transformed into a branch of the Tbilisi State University. This was opposed by the Abkhaz and eventually led to the clashes in the city.

In 2018, professors from Abkhazian State University visited the United States as part of an exchange program. The university employees visited the Arizona State University, San Diego State University, Rutgers University, Virginia Tech, Pennsylvania State University, University of Maryland, College Park and the United States Department of Agriculture.

In 2020, the Abkhazian State University established the Great Caucasus format together with the Armenian National University of Architecture and Construction of Armenia, the Russian North-Caucasus Federal University and the South Ossetian State University. The four universities will work more together and spread the use of the Russian language.

== See also ==
- List of split up universities
- Sokhumi State University
