= Beslan Bartsits =

Prime Minister of Abkhazia

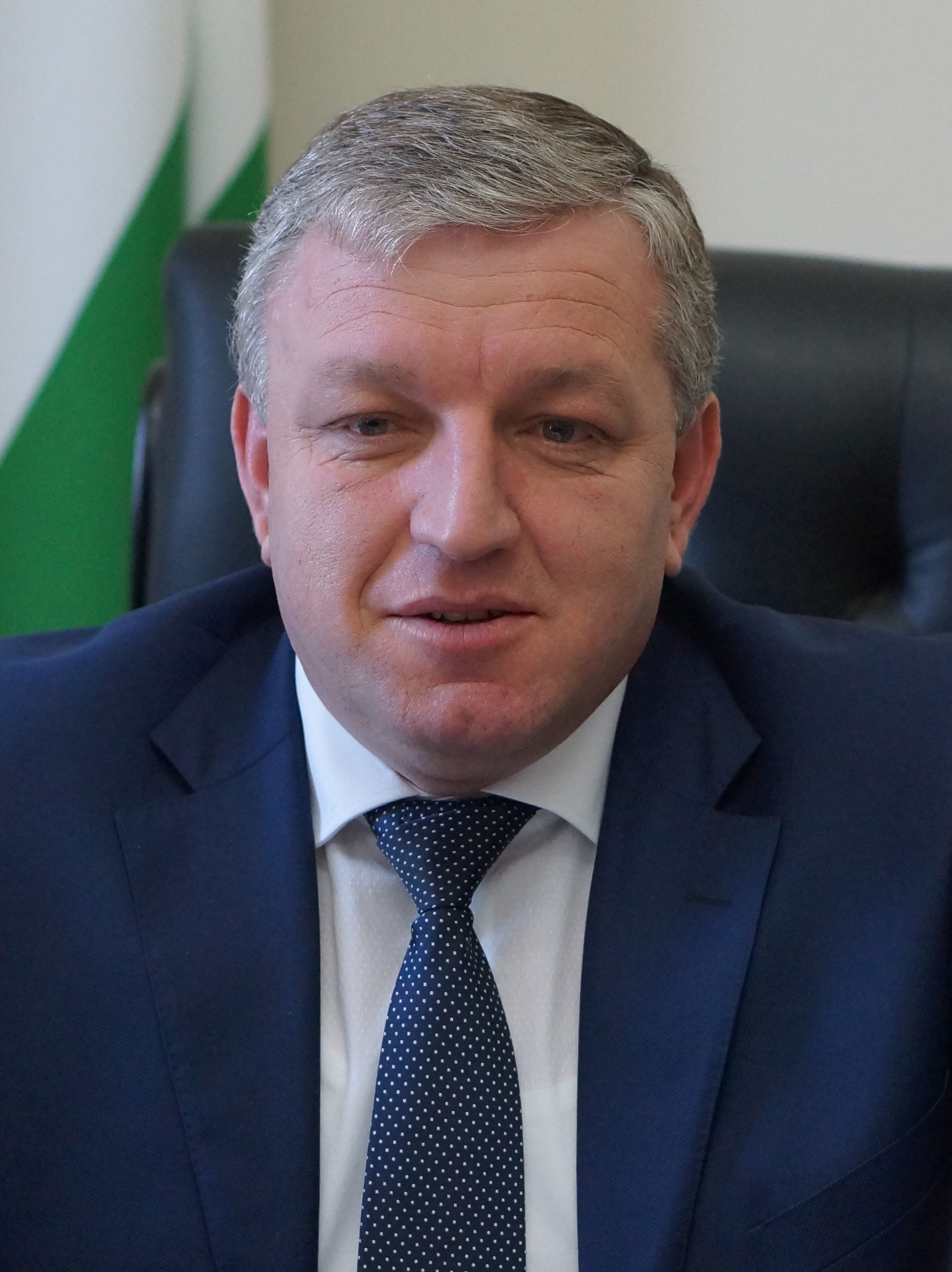

Prime Minister of Abkhazia
- In office 5 August 2016 – 25 April 2018
- President: Raul Khajimba
- Preceded by: Artur Mikvabia
- Succeeded by: Gennadi Gagulia

Governor of Gagra
- In office 22 October 2014 – 16 May 2016
- Preceded by: Grigori Enik
- Succeeded by: Zaur Bganba

Personal details
- Born: 22 July 1978 (age 48) Gagra, Soviet Union (now Abkhazia)
- Party: Independent
- Education: Abkhazian State University; Southern Federal University

Beslan Konstantinovich Bartsits (Russian: Беслан Константинович Барциц; born 22 July 1978) is a former Prime Minister of Abkhazia, having been appointed by President Raul Khajimba on 5 August 2016 with his term ending 25 April 2018. He previously served as head of the presidential administration, head of Gagra District and Member of Parliament.

== Early life and education ==
Bartsits was born in Gagra. In 2000, he graduated in jurisprudence from the Abkhazian State University, and between 2001 and 2004 he was a postgraduate student at Rostov State University.

Between 2007 and 2009, he was assistant to Raul Khajimba in his capacity as Vice President of Abkhazia.

== Member of Parliament ==
In the February 2011 local elections, Bartsits was elected deputy of the Gagra District Assembly in constituency no. 5 and became its deputy chairman.

In the March 2012 elections, he successfully ran for a seat of the 5th convocation of the People's Assembly of Abkhazia in constituency no. 11 (Gagra). In a field of nine candidates, he obtained a narrow first-round plurality with 20.86% of the votes. In the second round, he defeated runner-up Vitali Azhiba.

In Parliament, Bartsits served as Deputy Chairman of the Committee for Legal Policy, State Building and Human Rights.

== Head of the Presidential Administration ==
On 22 October 2014, following the May 2014 revolution, he was appointed acting head of Gagra District by newly elected president Raul Khajimba. The following year, he was confirmed in his post.

On 16 May 2016, Bartsits was appointed head of the Administration of the President of Abkhazia, to succeed Astamur Tania, who had resigned.

== Prime minister ==
On 5 August 2016, Bartsits was appointed prime minister, succeeding Artur Mikvabia who resigned ten days earlier.

Political offices
Preceded by Grigori Enik	Governor of Gagra; 2014–2016	Succeeded by Zaur Bganba
Preceded by Artur Mikvabia	Prime Minister of Abkhazia; 2016–2018	Succeeded by Gennadi Gagulia
Incumbent
