= Raul Khajimba =

President of Abkhazia from 2014 to 2020

- Рауль Ҳаџьымба
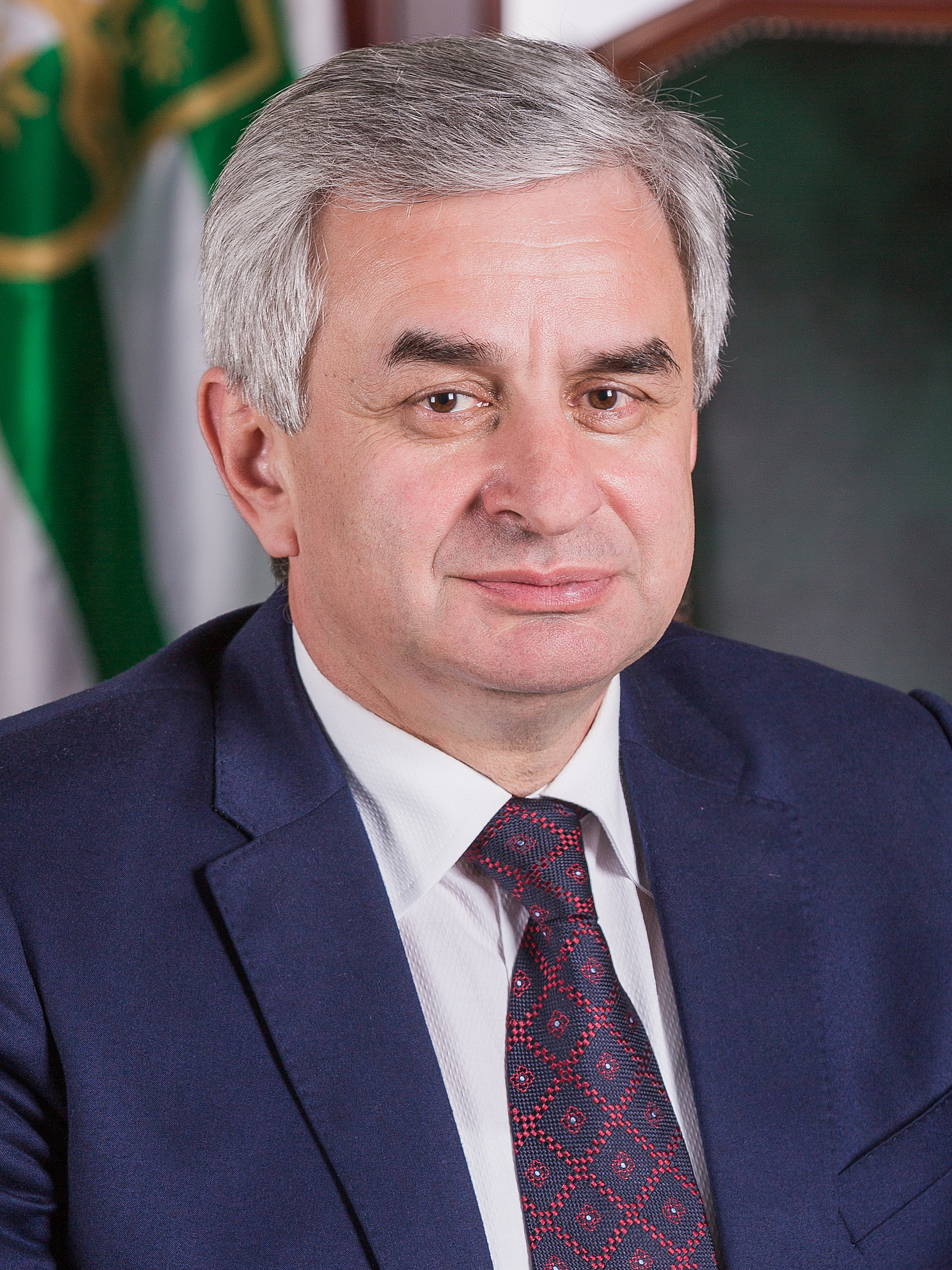
- Official portrait, 2015

4th President of Abkhazia
- In office 25 September 2014 – 12 January 2020
- Prime Minister: Beslan Butba; Artur Mikvabia; Beslan Bartsits; Shamil Adzynba (Acting); Gennadi Gagulia; Daur Arshba (Acting); Valeri Bganba
- Vice President: Vitali Gabnia; Aslan Bartsits
- Preceded by: Alexander Ankvab
- Succeeded by: Valeri Bganba (Acting)

Member of Parliament for Constituency no. 30 (Tkvarcheli)
- In office 3 April 2012 – 7 October 2014
- Preceded by: Daur Arshba
- Succeeded by: Taifun Ardzinba

Chairman of the Forum for the National Unity of Abkhazia
- In office 12 May 2010 – 31 March 2015
- Preceded by: Daur Arshba; Astamur Tania
- Succeeded by: Daur Arshba

Vice President of Abkhazia
- In office 12 February 2005 – 28 May 2009
- President: Sergei Bagapsh
- Preceded by: Valery Arshba
- Succeeded by: Alexander Ankvab

5th Prime Minister of Abkhazia
- In office 22 April 2003 – 6 October 2004
- President: Vladislav Ardzinba
- Preceded by: Gennady Gagulia
- Succeeded by: Nodar Khashba

Minister for Defence
- In office 19 December 2002 – 22 April 2003
- Prime Minister: Gennady Gagulia
- Preceded by: Vladimir Mikanba
- Succeeded by: Viacheslav Eshba

First Vice Premier of Abkhazia
- In office 18 June 2001 – 22 April 2003
- Prime Minister: Anri Jergenia; Gennady Gagulia
- Preceded by: Beslan Kubrava
- Succeeded by: Astamur Tarba

Head of the State Security Service
- In office December 1999 – 1 November 2001
- President: Vladislav Ardzinba
- Preceded by: Astamur Tarba
- Succeeded by: Zurab Agumava

Personal details
- Born: 21 March 1958 (age 68) Tkvarcheli, Georgian SSR, Soviet Union
- Party: Forum for the National Unity of Abkhazia
- Spouse: Saida Kuchuberiya
- Children: 2
- Education: Abkhazian State University

Military service
- Allegiance: Soviet Union; Abkhazia
- Branch/service: Soviet Air Force; Abkhazian Armed Forces
- Years of service: 1985–2014
- Rank: Major General
- Battles/wars: War in Abkhazia

Raul Jumkovich Khajimba (Abkhaz: Рауль Џьумка-иԥа Ҳаџьымба, Georgian: რაულ ჯუმკას-ძე ჰაჯიმბა; born 21 March 1958) is an Abkhazian politician who served as President of Abkhazia from 25 September 2014 until 12 January 2020. He was also Chairman of the Forum for the National Unity of Abkhazia from 2010 to 2015. Khajimba previously held the offices of Vice President (2005–2009), Prime Minister (2003–2004) and Defence Minister (2002–2003). He unsuccessfully ran for president in 2004, 2009 and 2011. He resigned the presidency in 2020 due to protests against him.

== Early life and career ==
Raul Khajimba was born on 21 March 1958 in Tkvarcheli, where he went to school and worked as a mechanic at the power station. From 1976 until 1978, he served in the Soviet Air Defence Forces. From 1979 until 1984, he graduated from the Law Faculty of the Abkhazian State University. From 1985 until 1986 Khajimba studied at the KGB school in Minsk, and he subsequently served as a KGB agent in Tkvarcheli until 1992.

During the 1992–1993 war with Georgia, Khajimba was the head of the military intelligence and counterintelligence operation on the eastern front. For his work, he was awarded the Order of Leon.

From 1996 until 1998, Khajimba headed the anti-smuggling division of the State Customs Committee. In 1998, he became its deputy chairman.

== In government (1999–2004) ==
=== Security Service chairman, First Vice Premier and Minister of Defence (1999–2003) ===
After a bomb attack on 13 December 1999 in Sukhumi targeting government officials, President Ardzinba dismissed Astamur Tarba as Security Service chairman and appointed Khajimba in his stead. On 18 June 2001, he additionally became First Vice Premier. On 1 November he was succeeded as Head of the State Security Service by Interior Minister Zurab Agumava. On 16 May 2002, Khajimba was appointed Defence Minister, replacing Vladimir Mikanba, while remaining First Vice Premier.

=== Prime Minister (2003–2004) ===
In the evening of 7 April 2003, Prime Minister Gennadi Gagulia filed for resignation. Early in the morning of that day, nine prisoners had escaped, four of which had been sentenced to death due to their involvement in the 2001 Kodori crisis. President Ardzinba initially refused to accept Gagulia's resignation, but was forced to agree on 8 April. Vice President Valery Arshba denied on 8 April that the government's resignation was due to the prison escape, and stated that instead it was caused by the opposition's plans to hold protest rallies on 10 April. On 22 April 2003, Raul Khajimba was appointed the new Prime Minister. He remained Prime Minister until October 2004.

As then-President Vladislav Ardzinba was seriously ill and did not appear in public during his term, Khajimba acted as a de facto head of state in his absence. In this role, he met a number of political leaders, including Igor Ivanov, foreign minister of Russia. He has been a sharp opponent of reunification with Georgia, and vehemently condemned Georgian President Mikhail Saakashvili's proposal for a two-state federation in May 2004.

== 2004 and 2005 presidential elections ==
Khadjimba was tipped as the favourite to win the October 2004 presidential elections, and was strongly endorsed by both outgoing president Ardzinba and Russian President Vladimir Putin. Both men campaigned on his behalf and dedicated significant resources to assisting the Khadjimba campaign. However, opposition candidate Sergei Bagapsh polled more votes on election day, in what was widely attributed as a backlash against the strong Russian influence in his campaign.

After the election, both Bagapsh and Khadjimba claimed victory, with Khadjimba alleging that electoral fraud in the pro-Bagapsh Gali region had been responsible for Bagapsh's win. Ardzinba soon dismissed Khadjimba as Prime Minister, replacing him with a compromise candidate, Nodar Khashba, and two months of drawn-out disputes followed, involving public protests, court action and parliamentary proceedings.

In December 2004, Khadjimba and Bagapsh came to an agreement which would see the pair run as part of a national unity ticket in repeat elections, with Khadjimba running as Bagapsh's vice-president. As part of this deal, the position of vice-president was given expanded powers covering defence and foreign affairs. The joint ticket easily won the January 2005 election, winning more than 90% of the vote.

== Vice President (2005–2009) ==
However, in the aftermath of the election win, many analysts have suggested that Khadjimba's executive authority would be somewhat limited under the new arrangement, with Bagapsh and his Prime Minister, Alexander Ankvab, likely to maintain ultimate control over the areas of policy nominally assigned to the vice-president.

The controversy resurfaced again in June 2008, when Khadjimba attended a congress of the Aruaa veteran organisation, of which he is a member. The congress issued a statement criticizing the Bagapsh administration's "multi-vector foreign policy", referring to the talks with Georgian and Western diplomats, and called for greater ties with Russia. The pro-Bagapsh politicians from the Amtsakhara veteran organisation described Khadjimba's criticism of the government, in which he was a vice-president, "immoral". Later that month, Khadjimba reiterated his stance towards Bagapsh's foreign policy, stating that Abkhazia's only protector could be Russia and using force would be inevitable for gaining control of the upper Kodori Valley in northeastern Abkhazia, the only part of Abkhazia under Georgian control at the time. In August 2008, the Abkhazian military did take the upper Kodory Valley by force during the August 2008 war over South Ossetia.

On 18 May 2009 the Forum of the National Unity of Abkhazia and Aruaa issued a press statement and on 20 May they gave a press conference with several other opposition parties, on both occasions voicing severe criticism over the achievements of the government and recent foreign policy decisions. On 28 May Khajimba resigned, saying that he agreed with the criticism, but attributing his failure to tackle corruption and improve security to lack of room for manoeuvre and no support from the president Bagapsh whom he also accused of violating the 2004 powersharing agreement and criticized him for signing a border protection agreement with Russia in 2009.

== Opposition leader (2009–2014) ==
=== 2009 presidential election ===
The Russian newspaper Kommersant reported that during the summer of 2009 Khajimba had entered negotiations with Beslan Butba over forming an alliance for in the presidential election, but the pair fell out following the visit of Russian Prime Minister Vladimir Putin to Abkhazia. Putin had met with Khajimba, but not with Butba, and Butba considered this an unfriendly act on the part of Khajimba. During the nomination period for candidates, Khajimba then tried to form a team with Ardzinba. The alliance would have combined Ardzinba's backing by part of the business community and his financial resources with Khajimba's electoral popularity. The pair said they would run together during two meetings with voters, and the idea was that they would receive the joint nomination by the Forum of the National Unity of Abkhazia. According to the Kommersant, in the end the pair could not agree on what positions they would get. Khajimba wanted the presidency, and offered Ardzinba to become Prime Minister, but this was not acceptable to the latter. The congress of the Forum of the National Unity of Abkhazia planned on 29 October was called off, and Ardzinba was instead nominated by an initiative group that day.

Khajimba had already been officially nominated for the presidency by an interest group on 19 October, and received the additional support on 20 October of the Forum of the National Unity of Abkhazia, Aruaa and Akhatsa. Khajimba picked Vasilii Avidzba as his vice presidential candidate.

Nevertheless, on 18 November Khajimba and Ardzinba announced that they would continue to coordinate their campaigns, and that they had appointed chairman of Aruaa, Vadim Smyr to lead this coordination. On 20 November, Khajimba stated that he and Ardzinba had different visions on coming to power, but that he did not consider Ardzinba his opponent, and that in the case of a second round, he, Ardzinba and Butba would support each other.

A second round proved to be unnecessary, since incumbent President Sergei Bagapsh won a 61.16% first round victory. Khajimba came in second place with 15,584 votes, 15.32% of the total number cast.

=== Chairman of the Forum of the National Unity of Abkhazia ===
On 12 May 2010, Raul Khajimba was elected Chairman of the FNUA, after the party congress had reduced the number of chairmen from 2 to 1.

=== 2011 presidential election ===
Khajimba again ran for president in 2011, after the death of President Sergei Bagapsh. His running mate was Svetlana Jergenia, widow of first President Vladislav Ardzinba. The pair was first nominated by an initiative group on 28 June and then by the Forum for the National Unity of Abkhazia on 16 July. They received the additional support of Akhatsa (5 July), Aruaa (7 July), former Prime Minister and 2004 presidential candidate Anri Jergenia (27 July) and the Union of the Cossacks of Abkhazia (5 August).

The pair scored a 19.82% third place, losing to Acting President Alexander Ankvab.

=== May 2014 revolution ===
Khajimba led opposition protests that forced Alexander Ankvab to resign as president on 1 June 2014. Khajimba won the subsequent presidential election with a slim 50.60% first-round victory.

== President (2014–2020) ==
Khajimba was inaugurated as president on 25 September 2014. Two months into his presidency, he signed a treaty with Russian president Vladimir Putin deepening ties between Abkhazia and Russia. Provisions of the agreement included placing the Abkhazian military under the direct control of Russia's armed forces and committing Abkhazia toward bringing its trade laws into alignment with the Eurasian Economic Union. The treaty was widely condemned in the West and by the Republic of Georgia, with US newspaper The New York Times suggesting the Abkhazian government had no choice but to agree to Putin's terms. However, Khajimba hailed closer ties with Russia as promoting "the full scope of guarantees for the safety of our state and extensive opportunities for the social and economic development".

Raul Khajimba as the Leader of Abkhazia got awarded with Order of Leon (as Vice President in 2005), Order of Merit, II degree (Transnistria in 2006 as vice president), Order of Merit, I Degree (Transnistria in 2015 as president), Order of Friendship (Republic of South Ossetia in 2015 as president), Order of Friendship (Transnistria in 2016 as president), and Umayyad Order (Syrian Arab Republic in 2018 as president).

Raul Khajimba was reelected in September 2019 after winning 26.33% of votes in the first round and 48.68% in the second. In January 2020 protests broke out against Khajimba. On 10 January the Supreme Court of Abkhazia declared Khajimba's victory in the 2019 presidential election nullified, and called for new elections on 22 March. On 12 January Khajimba resigned the presidency.

== See also ==
Political offices
Preceded by Astamur Tarba	Head of the State Security Service; 1999–2001	Succeeded by Zurab Agumava
Preceded by Beslan Kubrava	First Vice Premier; 2001–2003	Succeeded by Astamur Tarba
Preceded by Vladimir Mikanba	Minister for Defence; 2002–2003	Succeeded by Viacheslav Eshba
Preceded by Gennady Gagulia	Prime Minister of Abkhazia; 2003–2004	Succeeded by Nodar Khashba
Preceded by Valery Arshba	Vice President of Abkhazia; 2005–2009	Succeeded by Alexander Ankvab
Preceded by Daur Arshba	Member of Parliament for Constituency no. 30 (Tkvarcheli); 2012–2014	Succeeded by Taifun Ardzinba
Preceded by Alexander Ankvab	President of Abkhazia; 2014–2020	Succeeded by Valeri Bganba (Acting)
Incumbent
Party political offices
Preceded by Daur Arshba	Chairman of the Forum for the National Unity of Abkhazia; 2010–2015	Succeeded by Daur Arshba
Preceded by Astamur Tania	Chairman of the Forum for the National Unity of Abkhazia; 2010–2015	Succeeded by Daur Arshba
