= History of Abkhazia =

The history of Abkhazia, a region in the South Caucasus, spans more than 5,000 years from its settlement by the Lower Paleolithic hunter-gatherers to its present status as a partially recognized state.

== Prehistoric settlement ==
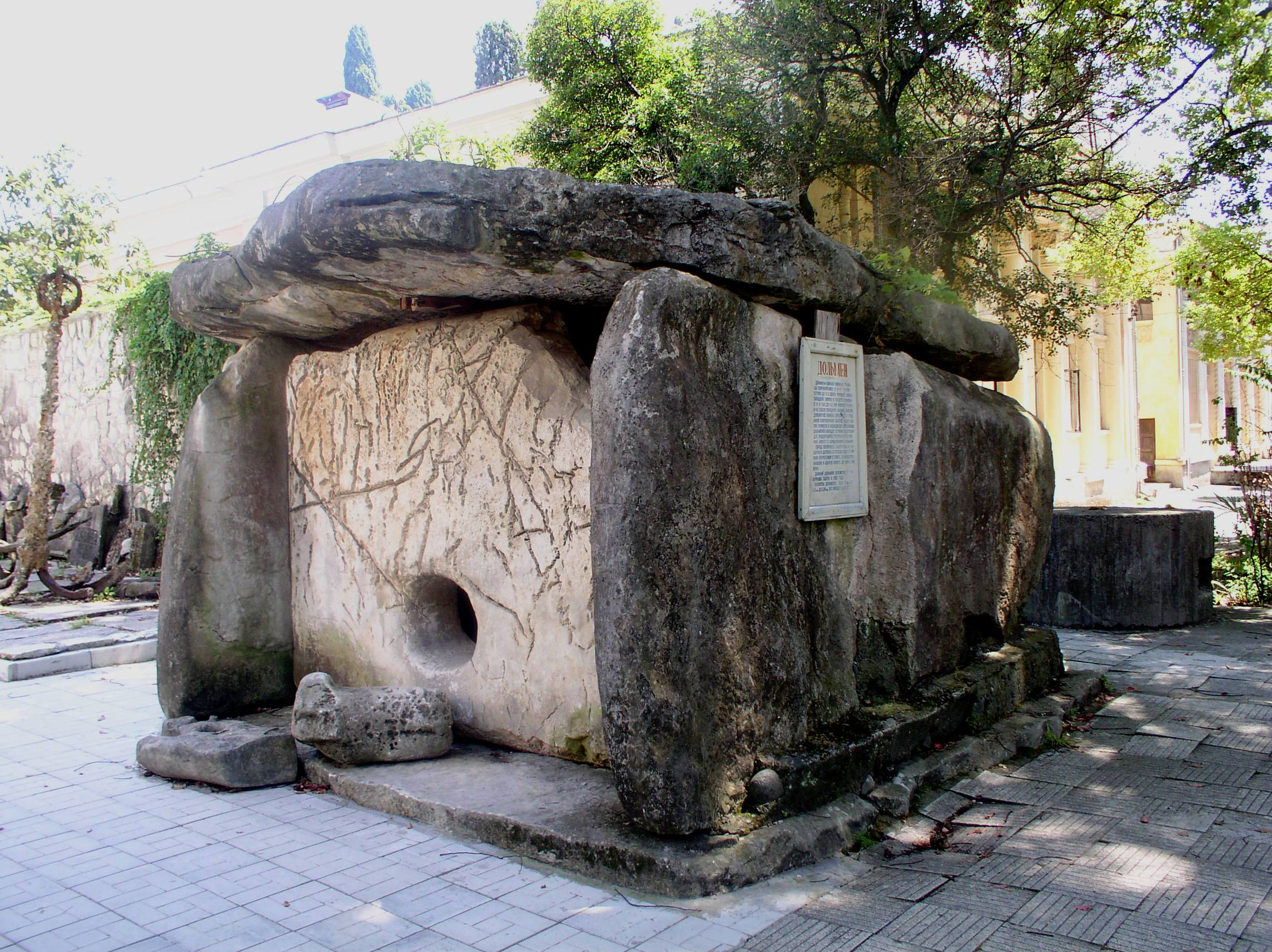
One of the dolmens from Eshera (now at the Sukhumi Museum)

Lower Paleolithic hunting-gathering encampments formed the first known settlements on the territory of modern-day Abkhazia. The earliest examples have been unearthed at the sites of Iashkhtva, Gumista, Kelasuri, and Ochamchire. Upper Paleolithic culture settled chiefly on the coastline. Mesolithic and Neolithic periods brought larger permanent settlements and marked the beginning of farming, animal husbandry, and the production of ceramics. The earliest artifacts of megalithic culture appeared in the early 3rd millennium BC and continued into the Bronze Age as the so-called dolmens of Abkhazia, typically consisting of four upright mass stones and a capstone, some of them weighing as much as 50 tonnes. A dolmen from the Eshera archaeological site is the best-studied prehistoric monument of this type. The Late Bronze Age saw the development of more advanced bronze implements and continued into the Iron Age as a part of the Colchian culture (c. 1200-600 BCE), which covered most of what is now western Georgia and part of northeastern Anatolia.

== Abkhazia in antiquity ==
The written history of Abkhazia largely begins with the coming of the Milesian Greeks to the coastal Colchis in the 6th-5th centuries BC. They founded their maritime colonies along the eastern shore of the Black Sea, with Dioscurias being one of the most important centers of trade. This city, said to be so named for the Dioscuri, the twins Castor and Pollux of classical mythology, is presumed to have subsequently developed into the modern-day Sukhumi. Other notable colonies were Gyenos, Triglitis, and later Pityus, arguably near the modern-day coastal towns of Ochamchire, Gagra, and Pitsunda, respectively.

The peoples of the region were notable for their number and variety, as classical sources testify. Herodotus, Strabo, and Pliny appreciate the multitude of languages spoken in Dioscurias and other towns. The mountainous terrain tended to separate and isolate local peoples from one another and encouraged the development of dozens of separate languages and dialects complicating the ethnic makeup of the region. Even the most well-informed contemporary authors are very confused when naming and locating these peoples and provide only very limited information about the geography and population of the hinterland. Furthermore, some classic ethnic names were presumably collective terms, and supposed considerable migrations also took place around the region. Various attempts have been made to identify these peoples with the ethnic terms employed by classical authors. Some scholars identify Pliny the Elder's Apsilae of the 1st century and Arrian's Abasgoi of the 2nd century with the probable proto-Abkhaz- and Abaza-speakers respectively, while others consider them proto-Kartvelian tribal designations. The identity and origin of other peoples (e.g., Heniochi, Sanigae) dwelling in the area is disputed. Archaeology has seldom been able to make strong connections between the remains of material culture and the opaque names of peoples mentioned by classical writers. Thus, controversies continue and a series of questions remain open.

The inhabitants of the region engaged in piracy, slave trade, and kidnapping people for ransom. Strabo described the habits of Achaei, Zygi, and Heniochi in his Geography as follows:

These people subsist by piracy. Their boats are slender, narrow, light, and capable of holding about five and twenty men, and rarely thirty. The Greeks call them camaræ. ... They equip fleets consisting of these camaræ, and being masters of the sea sometimes attack vessels of burden, or invade a territory, or even a city. Sometimes even those who occupy the Bosporus assist them, by furnishing places of shelter for their vessels, and supply them with provision and means for the disposal of their booty. When they return to their own country, not having places suitable for mooring their vessels, they put their camaræ on their shoulders, and carry them up into the forests, among which they live, and where they cultivate a poor soil. When the season arrives for navigation, they bring them down again to the coast. Their habits are the same even in a foreign country, for they are acquainted with wooded tracts, in which, after concealing their camaræ, they wander about on foot day and night, for the purpose of capturing the inhabitants and reducing them to slavery.

According to The Georgian Chronicles, the first inhabitants of what is now Abkhazia and the whole western Georgia were Egrosians, the descendants of Egros son of Togarmah, grandson of Japhet, son of Noah, who came from the land known as Arian-Kartli.

== Roman and Early Byzantine era ==
Along with the rest of Colchis, Abkhazia was conquered by Mithridates VI Eupator of Pontus between c. 110 and 63 BC, then taken by the Roman commander Pompey and incorporated into the Roman Empire in AD 61. The Roman rule here was tenuous and according to Josephus a Roman garrison of 3,000 hoplites and a fleet of 40 vessels could only control the ports. The Greek settlements suffered from the wars, piracy, and attacks of local tribes (during one of them Dioskurias and Pityus were sacked in AD 50). Roman documents mention a regiment consisting of Abasgoi (Ala Prima Abasgorum) that served in Kharga Oasis in Egypt in the 4th century AD.

According to scholar Donald Rayfield, in the 2nd century AD, Kartvelian tribes populated the shores of Colchis up to Dioscurias (modern-day Sukhumi) and were subject to Roman rule, although they were hostile to the Romans. In Dioscurias, Sanigs (Svans) and Abazgs (Abkhaz) escaped Roman jurisdiction.

In the 3rd century AD, the Lazi tribe came to dominate most of Colchis, establishing the kingdom of Lazica, locally known as Egrisi. It was subordinate to Constantinople; its kings had to be confirmed by the emperor and it contributed to the imperial treasury. By the 5th century, according to Procopius, the kings of Lazica no longer paid taxes to the empire, appointed the dukes of Abkhaz and Svans without consultation and garrisoned Sebastopolis (modern-day Sukhumi). The endorsement of the rulers of Lazica by the emperor became a formality. Some locals served in the Roman army, Ala Prima Abasgorum which was stationed in Egypt.

Colchis was a scene of the protracted rivalry between the Eastern Roman/Byzantine and Sassanid empires, culminating in the Lazic War from 542 to 562. The war resulted in the decline of Lazica, and the Abasgi in their dense forests became autonomous under the Byzantine authority. During this era, the Byzantines built Sebastopolis in the region. The land of Abasgi, known to the Byzantines as Abasgia, was a prime source of eunuchs for the empire until Justinian I (527-565) forbid the castration of boys. The people were pagan and worshiped groves and trees until a mission sent by the emperor Justinian I around 550 converted the people to Christianity and built a church. However bishop Stratophiles of Pytius attended the Council of Nicaea as early as 325. Byzantines constructed defensive fortifications that may have partially survived to this day as the Kelasuri Wall.

== Medieval Abkhazia ==
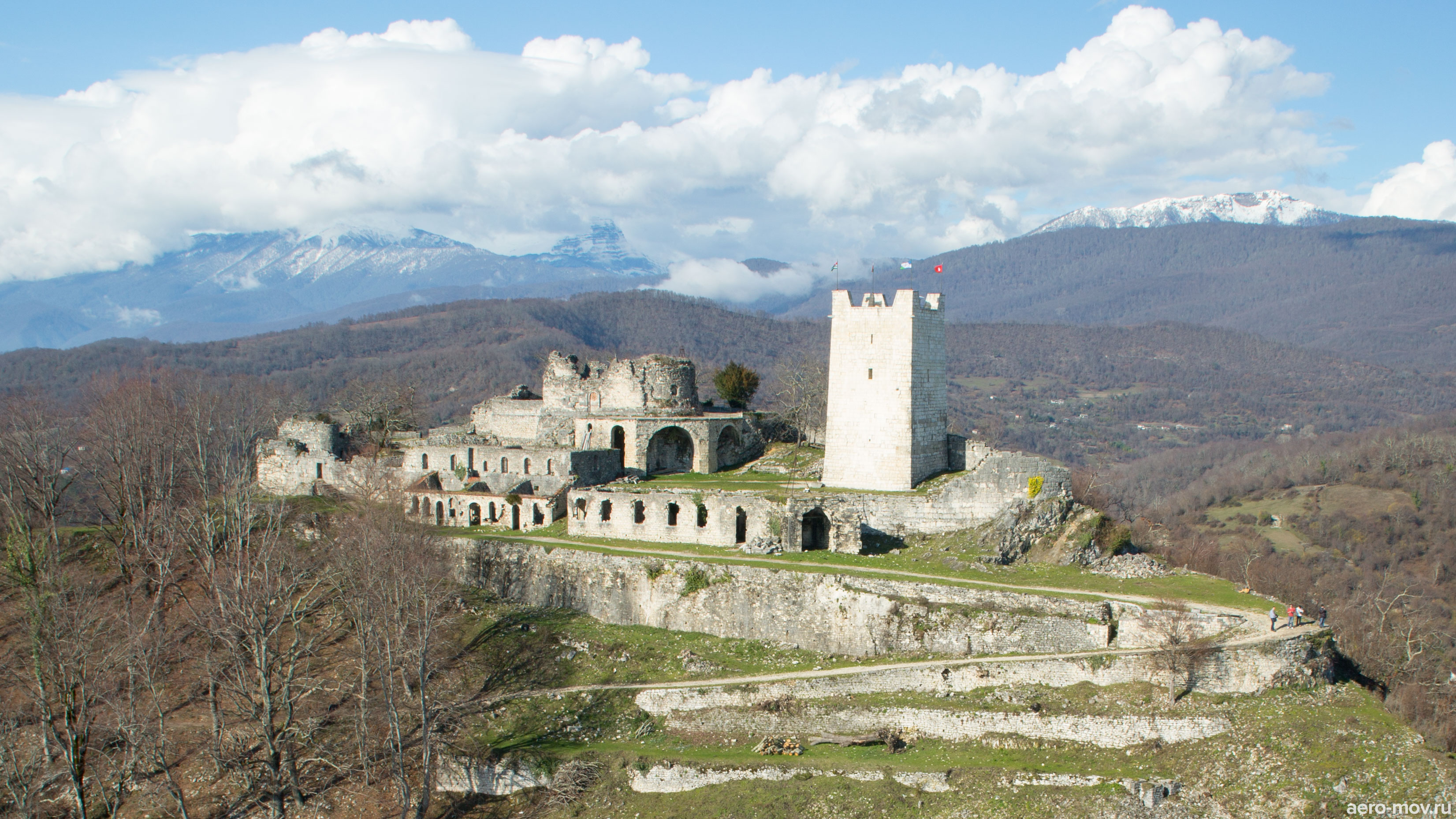
Anacopia Fortress

As the Abasgi grew in relative strength, the name Abasgia came to denote a larger area populated by various ethnic groups including Mingrelian- and Svan-speaking South Caucasian tribes, and subordinated to the Byzantine-appointed princes (Greek: archon, Georgian: eristavi) who resided in Anacopia and were viewed as major champions of the empire's political and cultural influence in the western Caucasus. The Arabs entered the area in the 730s, but did not subdue it; about then the term Abkhazeti ("the land of the Abkhazians") first appeared in the Georgian annals, giving rise to the name Abkhazia, which is used today in most foreign languages. Through their dynastic intermarriages and alliance with other Georgian princes, the Abasgian dynasty acquired most of Lazica/Egrisi, and in the person of Leo established themselves as "kings of the Abkhazians" in the 780s, even though the title was not recognised by the emperor in Constantinople who continued to call him archon when sending a gold ring of investiture. Leo married his daughter to the Khazar khan thus securing the northern frontiers and helping counter the Byzantine influence. The capital of the kingdom was transferred to the Georgian city of Kutaisi. In order to eliminate the Byzantine religious influence, the dynasty subordinated the local dioceses to the Georgian Orthodox patriarchate of Mtskheta. The Abkhaz participated in the rebellion of Thomas the Slav against Byzantine in 821-823. While the Byzantines sent their fleet to the Black Sea ports several times in the 9th century, their ability to influence the events in the Abkhazia was limited by the internal strife and the fight against Bulgarians.

The kingdom is frequently referred to in modern historiography as the Egrisi-Abkhazian kingdom due to the fact that the new monarchy was viewed by contemporaries as a successor state of Egrisi and sometimes used the terms interchangeably. By this time the majority of the population of the kingdom was likely Georgian. The Abkhazian Kings probably used Georgian as the state language in spite of their Abkhaz origins.

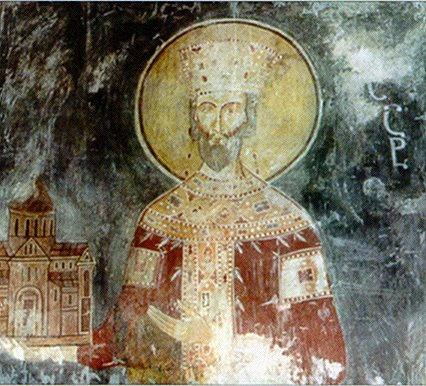
Bagrat III of Georgia; of the House of Bagrationi

The most prosperous period of the Abkhazian kingdom was between 850 and 950, when it dominated the whole western Georgia and claimed control even of the easternmost Georgian provinces. The terms "Abkhazia" and "Abkhazians" were used in a broad sense during this period – and for some while later – and covered, for all practical purposes, all the population of the kingdom regardless of their ethnicity. In 989, the Bagratid ruler Bagrat III came to power in Abkhazia which he inherited from his mother Gurandukht Anchabadze. In 1008 Bagrat inherited K'art'li from his father and united the kingdoms of Abkhazians and Iberians into a single Georgian feudal state.

This state reached the apex of its strength and prestige under the queen Tamar (1184–1213). On one occasion, a contemporary Georgian chronicler mentions a people called Apsars. This source explains the sobriquet 'Lasha' of Tamar's son and successor George IV as meaning "enlightenment" in the language of the Apsars. Some modern linguists link this nickname to the modern Abkhaz words a-lasha for "bright", identifying the Apsars with the possible ancestors of the modern-day Abkhaz.

According to the Georgian chronicles, the princely family of Shervashidze were the lords of a part of Abkhazia during the times of Queen Tamar. According to traditional accounts, they were an offshoot of the Shirvanshahs (hence allegedly comes their dynastic name meaning "sons of Shirvanese" in Georgian). The ascendancy of this dynasty (later known also as Chachba by the Abkhaz form of their surname) in Abkhazia would last until the Russian annexation in the 1860s. In the 1240s, Mongols divided Georgia into eight military-administrative sectors (dumans). The territory of contemporary Abkhazia formed part of the duman administered by Tsotne Dadiani.

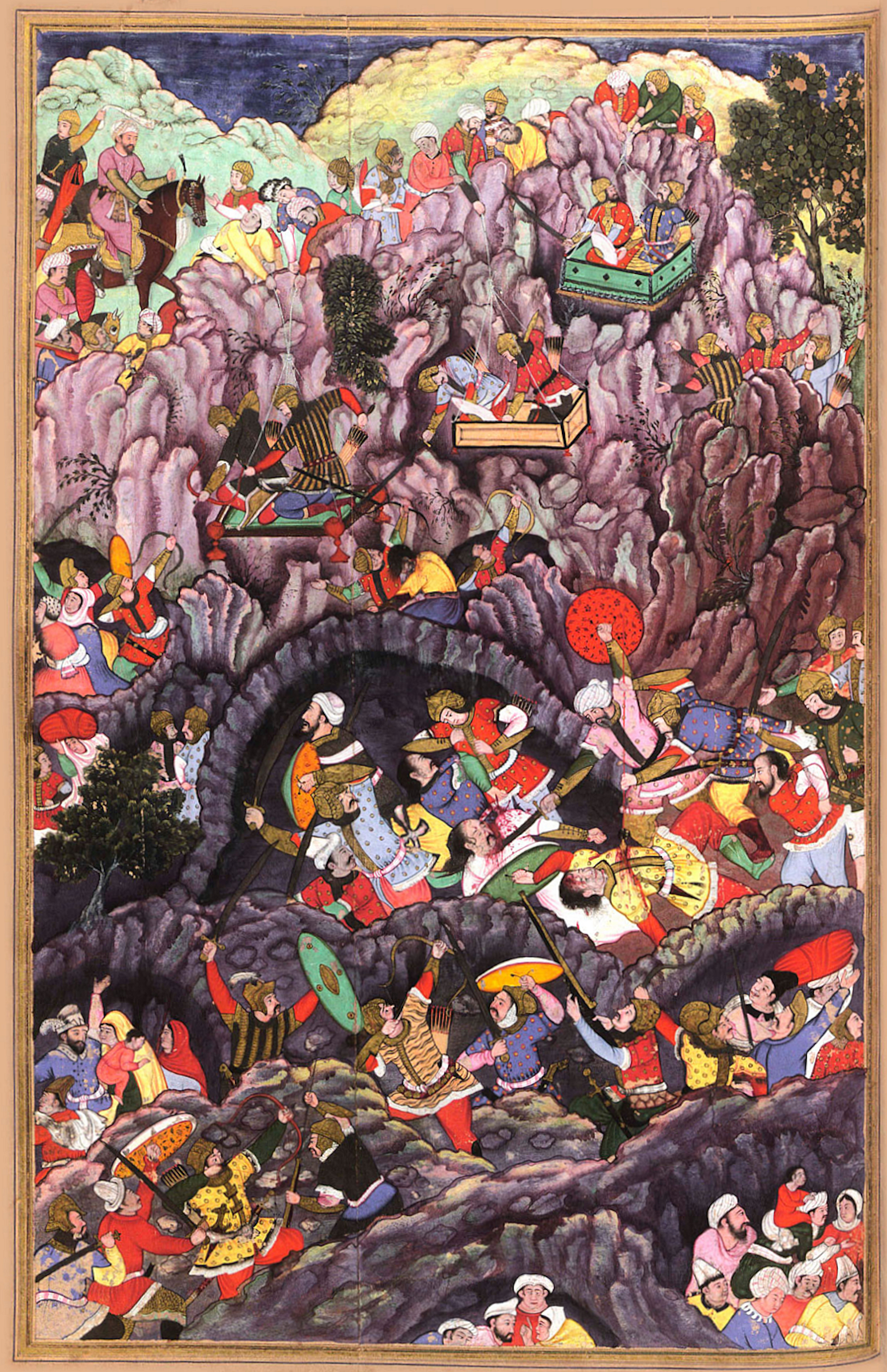
Timur's troops fighting in Abkhazia in 1403

The Genoese established their trading factories along the Abkhazian coastline in the 14th century, but they functioned for a short time. The area was relatively spared from the Mongol and Timur's invasions, which terminated Georgia's "golden age". As a result, the kingdom of Georgia fragmented into several independent or semi-independent entities by the late 15th century. The Principality of Abkhazia was one of them, and was formed around 1463. The Principality of Abkhazia, whereas it acted as an independent state, was officially a vassal of the Kingdom of Imereti, following a treaty signed in 1490 splitting Georgia into three nations. The Abkhazian princes engaged in incessant conflicts with the Mingrelian potentates, their nominal suzerains, and the borders of both principalities fluctuated in the course of these wars. In the following decades, the Abkhazian nobles finally prevailed and expanded their possessions up to the Inguri River, which is today's southern boundary of the region. Several medieval historians like Vakhushti and a few modern ones claimed that the Kelasuri Wall was built by prince Levan II Dadiani of Mingrelia as a protection against Abkhaz.

== Ottoman rule ==
In the 1570s, the Ottoman navy occupied the fort of Tskhumi on the Abkhazian coastline, turning it into the Turkish fortress of Suhum-Kale (hence, the modern name of the city of Sukhumi). In 1555, Georgia and the whole South Caucasus became divided between the Ottoman and Safavid Persian empires per the Peace of Amasya, with Abkhazia, along with all of western Georgia, remaining in the hands of the Ottomans. As a result, Abkhazia came under the increasing influence of Turkey and Islam, gradually losing its cultural and religious ties with the rest of Georgia. According to the Soviet historical science, Turkey, after the conquest has aimed at obliterating the material and spiritual culture of Abkhazia and forcibly convert the population to Islam, which led to numerous insurrections (in 1725, 1728, 1733, 1771 and 1806)

The spread of Islam in Abkhazia was first evidenced by the Ottoman traveler Evliya Çelebi in 1641. The Christianity was on the wane in the region. However, the Islamisation was more evident in the higher levels of society rather than the general population. In his book, Çelebi also wrote that the principal tribe of Abkhazian principality, Chách, spoke Mingrelian language, a subset of Kartvelian (Georgian) languages.

Towards the end of the 17th century, the principality of Abkhazia broke up into several fiefdoms, depriving many areas of any centralized authority. The region became a theatre of widespread slave trade and piracy. According to some Georgian scholars (such as Pavle Ingorokva), it was when a number of the Adyghe clansmen migrated from the North Caucasus mountains and blended with the local ethnic elements, significantly changing the region's demographic situation. In the mid-18th century, the Abkhazians revolted against the Ottoman rule and took hold of Suhum-Kale, but soon the Turks regained the control of the fortress and granted it to a loyal prince of the Shervashidze family.

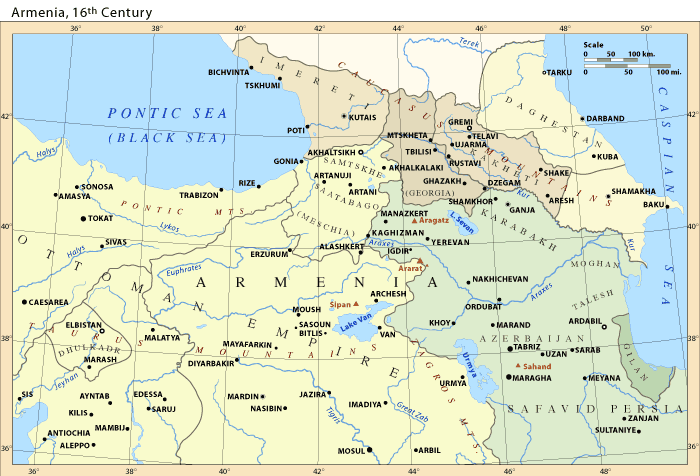
Kingdom of Imereti in the 16th century

== Russian rule ==
Russia annexed eastern Georgia in 1800 and took over Mingrelia in 1803. Kelesh Ahmed-Bey Shervashidze, the last pre-Russian ruler of Abkhazia had a long and successful reign. His invasion of the Principality of Mingrelia in 1802 contributed to Mingrelia becoming a Russian protectorate. Keleshbey died in 1808 and was succeeded by his eldest son Aslan-Bey Shervashidze. Kelesh also had a younger son, Sefer Ali-Bey Shervashidze, who lived in Mingrelia, was or became a Christian and was married to the Mingrellian ruler's sister. The Russians or Mingrelians claimed that Aslan-Bey had murdered his father. In August 1808, three months after Kelesh's death, a Mingrelian force failed to take Sukhumi. In February 1810, Russia recognized Sefer-Bey as hereditary prince of Abkhazia. In June of that year a Russian fleet captured Sukhumi and Aslan-Bey fled. Sefer-Bey, who ruled until 1821, was unable to control the countryside, things became disorganized and there were a number of revolts involving Aslan-Bey.

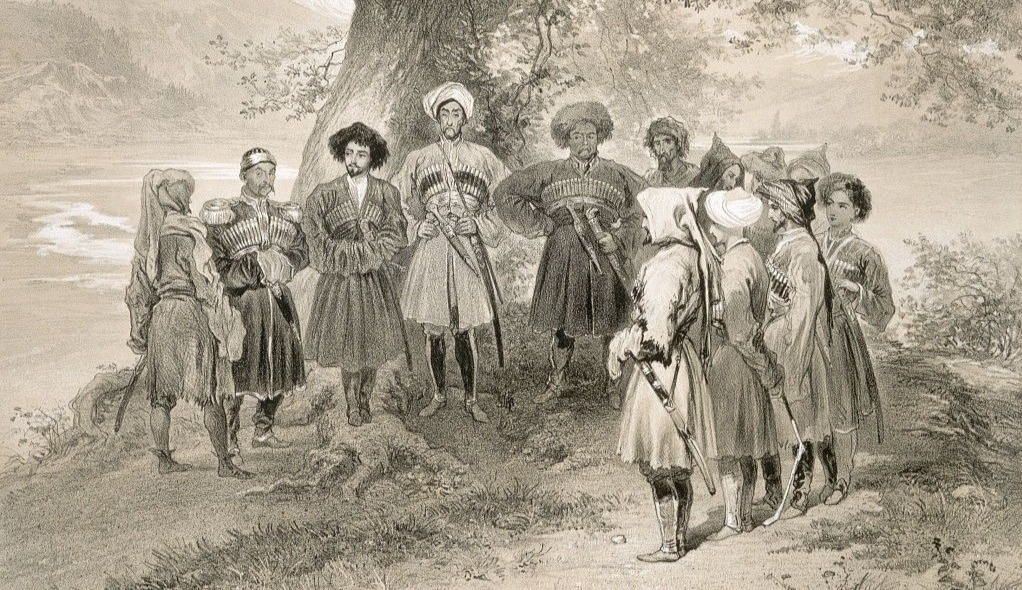
Meeting of Circassian Princes in the Valley of the Sochi River by Gregory Gagarin (1841). The print depicts several influential Abkhaz noblemen who played an active role in the politics of Abkhazia and in the regional conflicts

Initially, the Russian control hardly extended beyond Suhum-kale and the Bzyb area, with the rest of the region chiefly dominated by the pro-Turkish Muslim nobility. In a series of conflicts with the Ottoman Empire and the North Caucasian tribes, the Russians acquired possession of the whole Abkhazia in a piecemeal fashion between 1829 and 1842, but their power was not firmly established until 1864, when they managed to abolish the local princely authority. The last prince of Abkhazia, Michael Shervashidze (Chachba), was exiled to Russia where he soon died. The two ensuing Abkhaz revolts in 1866 and 1877, the former precipitated by the heavy taxation and the latter incited by the landing of the Turkish troops during the Russo-Turkish War, resulted in the next significant change in the region's demographics. As a result of harsh government reaction allegedly 60% of the Muslim Abkhaz population, although contemporary census reports were not very trustworthy — became Muhajirs, and emigrated to the Ottoman possessions between 1866 and 1878. In 1881, the number of the Abkhaz in the Russian Empire was estimated at only 20,000. Furthermore, a great deal of the population was forcibly displaced to Turkey (Muhajirs) and in 1877 the population of Abkhazia was 78,000, whereas at the end of the same year there were only 46,000 left. Those Abkhaz, who did not convert to Christianity, and who remained in Abkhazia were declared by the Russian government a "refugee population", branded as a "guilty people" and deprived of the right to settle in the coastal areas.

Large areas of the region were left uninhabited and many Armenians, Georgians, Russians and others subsequently migrated to Abkhazia, resettling much of the vacated territory. The Russian government had plans to colonize Abkhazia with Russian settlers, and created a special legal framework granting land allocations to Russians to encourage their migration. However, the Russian colonization efforts failed because of the lack of roads connecting Abkhazia to the main economic centers in Southern Russia, the unfamiliarity of the Russian settlers with local climate and agriculture, and their high susceptibility to malaria (leading to some deaths). This led to the other ethnic groups, which the Russian government did not plan to be settled in Abkhazia, to migrate spontaneously and outnumber the Russians in the region. This included former Ottoman subjects, such as Greeks and Armenians, and Mingrelians from the neighboring region within the empire. Both were more familiar with the local climate and were less susceptible to malaria. The Mingrelians became the largest group of arrivals, despite being marginalized as an agricultural labor force due to the lack of state support and legal restrains placed on them. Their arrival alarmed the Russian authorities, because they saw the Mingrelian migration as an impediment to the Russian colonization, and the Russian government responded with the legal measures to restrict the settlement of Mingrelians in Abkhazia. The Georgian intellectuals came into the political confrontation with the tsarist authorities, and in turn they encouraged the Mingrelian settlement, seeing it as an opportunity to upset the Russian designs in the region and restore the Georgian cultural tradition in Abkhazia, undermined by the Ottoman conquests, the spread of Islam and the Russian plans.

After the Russian Empire noticed the failure of its Russification policy in Georgia, it attempted to deny the existence of the Georgian nation, splitting it up in the 1897 Russian census into various sub-ethnic groups and promoting distinct identities for them, with the goal of preventing unified nationalism and rebellion. The same policy was conducted to alienate Abkhazians from Georgians despite their common historical heritage and few problems historically. In the case of the Abkhaz, Russia attempted to obviate the use of the Georgian language by Abkhazians which they previously wielded as the second language and used for the literacy and high culture. Instead, the Russian authorities put an effort to substitute Georgian with the Russian language. A separate Abkhaz alphabet was created based on Cyrillic script in 1862 by Peter von Uslar and the teaching of the Russian language to Abkhazians was mandated. Uslar regarded the Georgian alphabetic system as the most linguistically suitable model for Caucasian languages because of its one-to-one correspondence between sounds and letters. Nevertheless, he advocated adapting this system through Cyrillic letters rather than adopting Georgian script, which was connected both to practical considerations regarding the spread of Russian literacy and language in the region and to the goal of strengthening the desired cultural orientation of the Caucasus toward Russia, reflecting his broader support for the linguistic and cultural Russification.

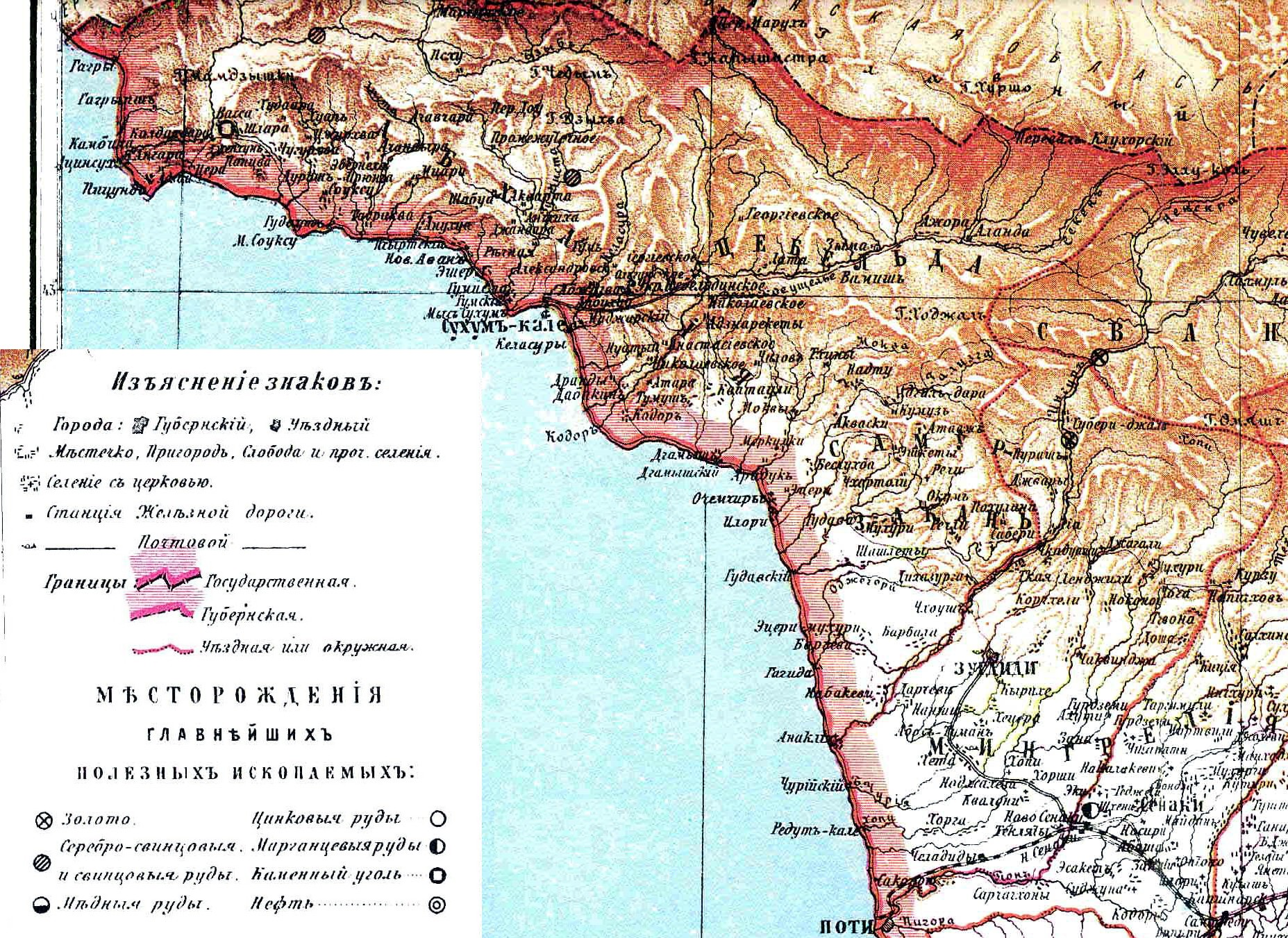
Map of Sukhumi district (Abkhazia), 1890s

According to the "household lists" gathered in 1886, the first survey to provide official data on the ethnic composition of Abkhazia, the largest group in Abkhazia were Samurzakanians, a mixed Abkhaz-Georgian group of disputed origins, making up 45.2% (30,640) of the population, followed by Abkhazians (41.8%; 28,320) and Mingrelian Georgians (5.1%; 3,474). The 1897 census counted Samurzakanians as the Abkhazians, increasing the Abkhazian share in the population to 55.3% (59,469), a 210% growth in 11 years, although the Georgian scholars contend that this was an arbitrary addition by the editors of the census. In the principal town of Sukhum-kaleh two-third of the population were Mingrelian Georgians and one-third were Abkhaz in 1911 according to the Encyclopædia Britannica.

On 17 March 1898, the synodal department of the Russian Orthodox Church of Georgia-Imereti, by Order 2771, again prohibited teaching and the conduct of religious services in Georgian. Mass protests by the Georgian population of Abkhazia and Samurzakano followed, news of which reached the Russian emperor. On 3 September 1898 the Holy Synod issued Order 4880, which decreed that those parishes where the congregation was Mingrelian (i.e. Georgian) conduct both church services and church education in Georgian, while Abkhazian parishes use old Slavic. In the Sukhumi district (Abkhazia), this order was carried out in only three of 42 parishes. Tedo Sakhokia demanded the Russian authorities introduce Abkhazian and Georgian languages in church services and education. The official response was a criminal case brought against Tedo Sakhokia and leaders of his "Georgian Party" active in Abkhazia.

After the abolition of the autocephalous status of the Georgian Church (1811) begins the process of Russification of the Catholicate of Abkhazia. Along with the attempt to transfer service from Georgian into Slavic, there is also a desire to introduce an antagonism of the Georgian-Abkhazian (Apsua) identity. Against this trend, actively advocated the advanced Abkhazian society, trying to convince Russian officials that Abkhazia historically, in their culture, religion, etc., is an integral part of Georgia. The Abkhaz royal family and nobility continued to regard themselves as belonging to the Georgian Christian world. In 1870, in a memo of the deputies of the Abkhazian nobility and Samurzakan (Emhvari B., M. Marchand, Margani T., K. Inal-ipa) to the Chairman of the Tiflis Committee for Estate and Land Questions Prince Pyotr Sviatopolk-Mirsky they asked him to conduct the land reform in Abkhazia in the same way as in the rest of Georgia, emphasizing that "Abkhazia from ancient times was part of the former Georgian kingdom...". The note provides evidence to support the common historical destiny of the Georgian and Abkhaz peoples, who are, according to the authors, "important witnesses of Abkhazia belonging to Georgia" and expresses the hope that they (Abkhazians) will not be "excluded from the overall family of the Georgian people, to which from time immemorial they belonged to." In 1916, Tbilisi was visited by the Abkhazian delegation consisting of princes M. Shervashidze, M. Emhvari, A. Inal-ipa, and representatives of the peasantry P. Anchabadze, B. Ezugbaya and A. Chukbar. On behalf of the Abkhaz people, they petitioned for economic and cultural development of the region and raised the question of the transformation of the Sukhumi district into a separate province. "If this is impossible", told delegates, "then in any case do not connect it (Sukhum district) to any other province, except Kutaisi". Equally urgent was the demand of the deputation not to separate from the exarchate of Georgia Sukhumi bishoprics, which have always been an inseparable part of the Georgian Church.

Meanwhile, in 1870, bound peasants, including slaves, were liberated in Abkhazia as a part of the Russian serfdom reforms. The peasants got between 3 and 8 ha and had to pay huge redemption payments (the landowners got up to 275 ha); furthermore, according to a contemporary Russian official, peasants were mostly left with rocky mountain slopes and low-lying bogs. The liberation in Abkhazia was more problematic than elsewhere as it failed to take into account fully the distinction between free, partly free and unfree peasants in the Abkhazian society.

This reform triggered the moderate development of capitalism in the region. Tobacco, tea and subtropical crops became more widely grown. Industries (coal, timber) began to develop. Health resorts started to be built. A small town of Gagra, acquired by a German prince Peter of Oldenburg, a member of the Russian royal family, turned to a resort of particular tourist interest early in the 1900s (decade). In 1904, the territory of Gagra District was detached from Sukhumi okrug and joined to the Black Sea Governorate.

In the Russian Revolution of 1905, most Abkhaz remained largely loyal to the Russian rule, while Georgians tended to oppose it. As a reward for their allegiance, tsar Nicholas II officially forgave the Abkhaz for their opposition in the 19th century and removed their status of a "guilty people" in 1907.

By the early 20th century, the Georgians, represented by Samurzakanians and Mingrelians, were the largest group in Abkhazia, but from the social point of view, they were the most disadvantaged and marginalized group, being agricultural workers with severe restrictions on their residential status by the imperial authorities. The Abkhaz and the Russians were the well-off groups which controlled large amounts of land and were well-represented in the nobility and bureaucracy. Armenians and Greeks were mostly involved in the tobacco industry.

== Abkhazia from 1917 to 1921 ==
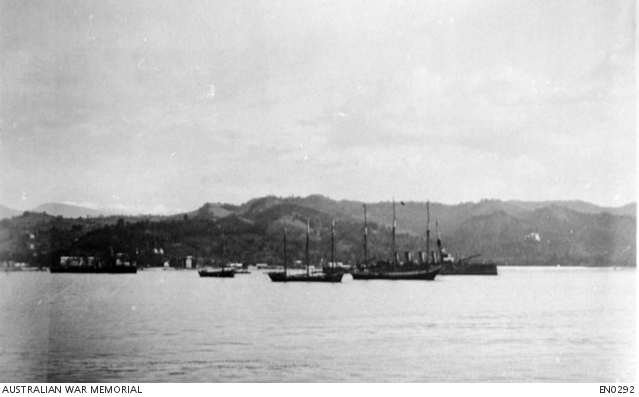
British warships in Sukhumi port in October 1918. The UK played an active role mediating between Georgia and White Russian forces in the wake of the Russian Revolution

Shortly after the February Revolution, a provisional government headed by Aleksandr Shervashidze was established in Sukhumi in March 1917. Abkhazia joined the Union of the Peoples of the Northern Caucasus in September and, through it, the South-Eastern Union of Cossacks, Caucasian Mountaineers and Steppe Peoples in October 1917. The South-Eastern Union declared that its members would seek membership in "the future Russian Democratic Federative Republic" as "independent states", choosing to remain within Russia amid growing political instability and anarchy. In November, Abkhazia adopted a constitution and established the Abkhaz People's Council (APC), with Simon Basaria as its chairman. The council consisted of representatives of the Abkhazian population. The constitution referred only to the Abkhaz people and did not take into account the rights of other nationalities living in Abkhazia. Abkhazia did not declare independence, although the constitution included a provision on self-determination.

The 1917 Bolshevik October Revolution and the ensuing Russian Civil War forced the major national forces of South Caucasus – Armenia, Azerbaijan, and Georgia – to unite into a fragile federative structure with the Transcaucasian Seim as the governing body. The Abkhaz People's Council was recognized by the Transcaucasian Seim in February 1918. The desire of the Abkhaz People's Council to join the North Caucasus diminished with the rise of Bolshevik power in Gudauta and the outbreak of the Russian Civil War. The Abkhaz leadership, which was anti-Bolshevik, acknowledged that Transcaucasia was a safer refuge from Bolshevism than the nascent confederation in the North Caucasus. In this context, representatives of the Abkhaz People's Council and the Georgian National Council met on 9 February 1918 to discuss their future relationship. The Abkhaz representatives stated that they viewed Abkhazia as "an independent political entity", while the Georgians regarded Abkhazia as part of Georgia with "full internal independence." The sides were unable to reach a consensus, signing only a preliminary agreement, which stipulated that the political status of Abkhazia would remain unspecified until after the election of a Constituent Assembly in Abkhazia representing its entire population, unlike the Abkhaz People's Council, which represented only ethnic Abkhazians. In return, the Georgian National Council agreed to recognize the borders of Abkhazia to include Samurzakano, whose population had declared that it would secede from Abkhazia if the region did not join Georgia.

In March 1918, Russian Bolsheviks reached Sukhumi, and the local Bolsheviks seized power in Abkhazia in April 1918. The Abkhaz People's Council requested help from Georgia and Transcaucasian Seim, which dispatched its troops and defeated the uprising on 17 May 1918 with the support of members of the APC and some Abkhaz cavalry.

The Transcaucasian Democratic Federative Republic formally declared independence in April 1918, following an Ottoman demand that it do so as a precondition for conducting peace negotiations to bring an end to the fighting on the Caucasus Front of the First World War. Abkhazia, as part of the federation with an unspecified political status, sent delegates to the Batumi peace conference between Transcaucasia and the Ottoman Empire in May 1918. At the conference, they met representatives of the Mountainous Republic of the Northern Caucasus, which had recently declared independence under Ottoman protection. Abkhaz delegates Aleksandr Sharvashidze and Tatash Marshania held separate talks with Ottoman military officers of Abkhazian descent and requested that Turkish troops help unite Abkhazia with the North Caucasus. This proposal gained the support of four of the nine members of the Abkhaz delegation.

Meanwhile, the short-lived Transcaucasian Democratic Federative Republic came to an end, and the independence of the Democratic Republic of Georgia (DRG) was proclaimed on 26 May 1918. In June, the Abkhaz People's Council dispatched a delegation to Tbilisi. The head of the delegation, Razhden Kakuba, affirmed the "shared interests of the peoples of Abkhazia and Georgia" and expressed hope that they would maintain close ties, asserting that both faced "common foes". He further expressed hope that the Georgian government would assist the Abkhaz People's Council in establishing state authority in the region, and stated that it sought Georgian support in dealing with several issues: the "independent landowning class", which relied on Turkey to restore its rights; the "small Bolshevik current"; and the "sympathizers of the mountaineers of the North Caucasus". Kakuba requested that Georgia retain the Georgian People's Guard in Sukhumi and provide additional military and economic assistance. At first, the Abkhaz delegation sought recognition of Abkhazia's independence. The Georgian government, however, was unwilling to provide such support as long as Abkhazia continued to insist on separation. In the same month, the Abkhaz government requested Georgian assistance in preventing General Anton Denikin's Volunteer Army from entering Abkhazia. The Abkhaz People's Council, desperate for protection and security, accepted the need for Abkhazia's unification with Georgia and signed a corresponding treaty on 11 June as an "extension and supplement" to the 9 February agreement.

The agreement provided for the creation of the post of Minister for Abkhazian Affairs within the Georgian government, while the Abkhaz People's Council remained responsible for "internal administration and self-rule". It also provided for Georgian financial assistance, as Abkhazia had few sources of revenue of its own, the deployment of additional Georgian troops to Abkhazia, the formation of a multiethnic division, the implementation of social reforms in Abkhazia based on Georgian law, and Georgia's responsibility for representing Abkhazia in foreign affairs. Accordingly, all domestic affairs were placed under the jurisdiction of the Abkhaz People's Council, while foreign affairs became the responsibility of Georgia. Abkhazia was integrated into the Georgian financial system. Like the agreement of 9 February, the treaty did not specify Abkhazia's final political status, leaving it pending the election of a representative assembly in the region, although it implied the formation of a political union. According to Charlotte Hille, the arrangement resembled a federation. The agreement was considered a reasonable solution, as few residents of Abkhazia, whether Abkhaz, Georgian, Greek, Russian, or Armenian, supported secession.

Another treaty had been signed earlier, on 8 June, by the Abkhaz representative Varlam Shervashidze and the Georgian representative Akaki Chkhenkeli. Both treaties addressed the political system in Abkhazia, the powers of the Georgian government there, and the rights of the Abkhaz People's Council. The reason for the two treaties was the split within the Abkhaz People's Council, which had occurred in May 1918 between pro–North Caucasian and pro-Georgian factions. The delegation that negotiated the 8 June treaty had not been granted plenipotentiary powers to conclude it, rendering the agreement invalid and necessitating the signing of a new one. The 8 June treaty had been concluded by the pro-Georgian Abkhaz faction without consulting the opposing faction. On 11 June, German troops arrived in Georgia to help protect its territorial integrity against Ottoman aggression, following the agreements between Georgia and Germany, under which Germany recognized the Sukhumi Okrug and Gagra as parts of Georgia. On 13 June, the government of the Mountainous Republic of the Northern Caucasus sent a protest note to the German diplomatic mission against the "occupation" of Abkhazia, illustrating the competing claims over Abkhazia by Georgia and the North Caucasus and the dual attitude within Abkhazia.

Following the 11 June agreement, which had already established the principle of Abkhazia's unification with Georgia, what remained was to negotiate the precise terms of that unification. However, due to the precarious situation in the region, discussions soon shifted from negotiations over local powers to questions of state security, leading to rising tensions. Georgian troops under Giorgi Mazniashvili halted the advance of the Volunteer Army, but on 23 June Mazniashvili appointed himself Governor-General of Abkhazia without the approval of the APC and declared martial law. This occurred as another Bolshevik rebellion began in the region. The Abkhaz People's Council protested to the central government. Those who favored union with the Mountain Republic interpreted the event as a "Georgian occupation." A second challenge came in the form of a Turkish landing in Kodori, as had been agreed during the May conference by some Abkhaz deputies. Although a large part of the detachment was disarmed, some members escaped to nearby villages and clashed with Georgian troops. As a result of the fighting, the houses of several "unreliable villagers" were destroyed, and several people were arrested, although the Georgian government later ordered compensation for three of them due to "misconduct". The Council requested that the Georgian government provide its representatives with "clear and well-defined instructions" for dealing with Abkhazia and demanded the appointment of a civilian representative to oversee the arrangement. The Georgian government ordered the Council to expand its composition to include representatives of non-Abkhazian ethnic groups and agreed to dispatch a civilian envoy. On 24 July 1918, another agreement was signed placing Abkhazia within Georgia. The treaty stipulated that the Abkhaz People's Council would continue to govern the region as before until a national assembly determined Abkhazia's future status.

The Georgian troops managed to drive the Bolsheviks out of Abkhazia and also captured Sochi and Tuapse. On 24 June 1918, the Abkhaz People's Council passed a resolution supporting the occupation of the Sochi and Tuapse districts, arguing that the Bolshevik unrest in Abkhazia was sustained by forces operating from those areas and that Bolshevik control had disrupted vital food supplies from the North Caucasus. The ruling socialist council in Sochi unanimously requested that the Georgian government annex the Sochi district, although representatives of the Kuban government asked the Georgians to evacuate both Sochi and Gagra, claiming that the majority of the population there was neither Abkhazian nor Georgian. In September, talks with the Volunteer Army failed to resolve the differences between the two sides, and the Volunteer Army threatened to invade Abkhazia. In January–February 1919, the Volunteer Army pushed back the Georgian army and occupied territories as far as Gagra. The Abkhaz nobility, which had previously relied on Turkey, now turned to the Volunteer Army for support. The crisis led to the dismissal of pro-Turkish members of the Abkhaz People's Council by the Georgian government on 15 August. On 3 September, a joint Georgian-Abkhaz commission was established to investigate complaints from the APC regarding the arrests of locals following the Bolshevik-inspired revolt in New Athos. In October 1918, as the threat of a Volunteer Army invasion loomed, the pro-Turkish noble faction surrounded the Council headquarters with mounted militiamen and demanded the resignation of the Abkhaz People's Council, but they were dispersed by government forces. Following this "attempted coup", the Georgian government, with the support of Abkhaz People's Council chairman Varlam Shervashidze and several other deputies, dissolved the Council, claiming that pro-Turkish sympathies threatened Georgia's security. Pro-Turkish deputies were arrested and sent to Metekhi Prison in Tbilisi, although they were later released following a request from the British. Elections were announced for a fully representative district council, while former Sukhumi mayor Benjamin Chkhikvishvili was appointed as temporary administrator. On 27 December 1918, an electoral law was adopted, granting the right to vote to all residents regardless of gender, nationality, or religion. The Abkhaz deputies released from prison were also allowed to participate in the elections as candidates and voters.

In February 1919, the elections were held to the new People's Council. The voters elected forty deputies; twenty ethnic Abkhazians were elected, but only seven from them were anti-Georgian. The Social Democrats won the election. They were careful to avoid creating the perception of hegemonic Georgian rule and included Abkhazians as half of their delegates. The council adopted a framework of Abkhazia's autonomy within the Georgian Democratic Republic and on March 20, 1919, the newly elected Abkhazian People's Council passed the "Act on Abkhazian Autonomy". 34 deputies attended the session, 27 deputies voted in favor, 3 abstained, while 4 did not vote.

After the occupation of Gagra, Denikin pushed for the declaration of Abkhazia as a neutral territory. Aleksandr Shervashidze supported Denikin's entry into Abkhazia. Great Britain, which mediated between the Volunteer Army and Georgia, initially agreed to the proposal and defined this territory as the area between the Bzyb and Ingur rivers and the Black Sea. In a telegram to British Generals George Milne and George Forestier-Walker, Denikin claimed that the elections in Abkhazia had been conducted under military pressure. On 23 January 1919, the British command informed Georgian Prime Minister Noe Zhordania that Georgia's borders would remain inviolable, as Denikin had occupied Gagra after the British had previously demarcated the border. In May 1919, Denikin agreed to allow "Sukhum temporarily remaining under Georgian administration" on the condition that Georgia accepted relinquishing control of Gagra and that Russian property in Georgia would be protected, with expropriations carried out only with public support and compensation to the owners. The British command proposed establishing the border along the Bzyb River. In April 1919, the Georgian army drove the Volunteer Army out of Gagra.

After the election, the Georgian government returned to the question of clarifying the nature and extent of Abkhazia's autonomy. Prime Minister Noe Zhordania told the Georgian Constituent Assembly:

We can accept all [Abkhazian] demands concerning autonomy, no matter how wide. There is only one thing we cannot accept: separation and unification with [Denikin's Volunteer Army].

The ethnically divided People's Council, however, was unable to reach an agreement on the substance of Abkhazia's autonomy. Overall, 14 Abkhazian deputies joined an "independent camp" that advocated greater decentralization, leading to the division of the Council's constitutional committee into two factions. None of the drafts managed to secure a two-thirds majority. In 1920, the People's Council of Abkhazia finally managed to overcome its differences and presented two drafts. The final project represented a compromise that accommodated the various Abkhaz positions within the People's Council. However, a dispute emerged over whether autonomous powers would be delegated by the Constituent Assembly of Georgia or derived from a bilateral agreement. The Georgian government invited the Abkhaz delegation to participate in the Constituent Assembly's constitutional commission rather than the bilateral commission, while proposing the adoption of a temporary law on Abkhazian autonomy before the constitutional approval of Abkhazia's status. This proposal was rejected by APC deputies. Despite this breakdown in negotiations, in late December 1920, a rump constitutional commission submitted a draft "Act on the Administration of Autonomous Abkhazia" based on the draft constitution presented by the Abkhaz delegation. The Assembly reviewed the draft and noted that it required approval by the full constitutional commission. However, this came too late, as Soviet Russia invaded Georgia on 11 February 1921. On 21 February, under siege conditions, the Georgian Constituent Assembly swiftly approved Georgia's new constitution, which included provisions for autonomy in Abkhazia.

== Soviet Abkhazia ==
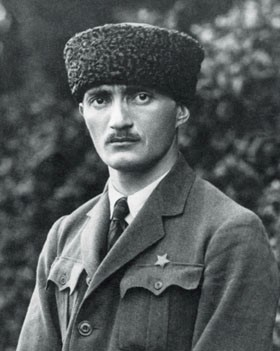
Nestor Lakoba, a Bolshevik leader of Abkhazia from 1921 to 1936

Despite the 1920 treaty of non-aggression, Soviet Russia's 11th Red Army invaded the Democratic Republic of Georgia, and marched on Tbilisi on February 11, 1921. Almost simultaneously, 9th (Kuban) Army entered Abkhazia on February 19. Supported by the local pro-Bolshevik guerillas, the Soviet troops took control of most of Abkhazia in a series of battles from February 23 to March 7, and proceeded into the neighbouring region of Mingrelia.

On March 4, the Soviet power was established in Sukhumi, with the formation of the Abkhazian Soviet Socialist Republic (Abkhazian SSR) by the local Bolsheviks, subsequently recognized by the newly established Communist regime of the Georgian SSR on May 21. On December 16, however, Abkhazia signed a special "union treaty" delegating some of its sovereign powers to Soviet Georgia. Abkhazia became a "treaty republic" associated with Georgia, although this status was unusual and it was not well-defined. The exact status of Abkhazia as a "treaty republic" was never clarified during its existence, and historian Arsène Saparov has argued that even officials at the time did not know what the phrase meant. In practice, it was similar to an autonomous republic. The existence of the Abkhaz SSR, however, was an anomaly in the Soviet nationalities policy. Granting full-republic status to Abkhazia contradicted the Soviet policies since such status was only reserved for ethnic groups with large enough population size and share in the total demographics of the region.

Abkhazia and Georgia together entered the Transcaucasian SFSR on December 13, 1922, and on December 30 joined the Union of Soviet Socialist Republics. Abkhazia's ambiguous status of Union Republic was written into that republic's constitution on April 1, 1925. Paradoxically, there was an earlier reference to Abkhazia as an autonomous republic in the 1924 Soviet Constitution. It remained unratified until 1931 when Abkhazia's status was changed to an Autonomous Soviet Socialist Republic (ASSR) within the Georgian SSR. Except for a few nobles, the Abkhaz did not participate in the 1924 August Uprising in Georgia, a last desperate attempt to restore the independence of Georgia from the Soviet Union.

Initially, the enacted Soviet nationalities policy benefited the ethnic Abkhazians at the expense of Georgians. The share of Abkhazians in the population increased from 19.8% to constitute 27.8%, while their share in the local communist party increased from 10% to 25%, with the Georgian share within the population and the communist party diminishing. In the 1920s, the latinized script was devised for the Abkhaz language. A commission led by I. Azatian, an Armenian, sent by the Transcaucasian central executive committee to investigate the situation in Abkhazia in 1925, reported that the Abkhaz authorities under Nestor Lakoba were conducting the policy of Abkhazification. The report noted that all major posts were held by the Abkhaz, they were overrepresented in the local structures such as the police, and the local Komsomol was only admitting ethnic Abkhazians. However, in the 1930s, the Soviet nationalities policy under Joseph Stalin shifted from encouraging ethnic minorities to the national consolidation. The aim now was to assimilate the ethnic minorities in the Soviet republics into the titular nationalities of these respective republics, with these titular nationalities then to be assimilated into the "Soviet people" under the lead of "elder brother" Russians in what can be described as the "pyramid of assimilation". The new Soviet policy of national-cultural assimiliation was implemented in all Soviet republics in relation to different minority ethnicities. In 1938, a script reform was implemented in the USSR, which replaced the earlier Latinized scripts with the Cyrillic ones. The new Latinized scripts were deemed by the Soviet government as inadequate for the needs of modernization, and the Cyrillisation was also to serve the purpose of consolidation of the state. The alphabets of well-established literary languages, which had their own non-Cyrillic scripts, such as Armenian, Finnish, Georgian, Yiddish, and the Baltic languages, were retained, and the Georgian script was extended to the Abkhaz and Ossetian languages in the Georgian SSR in 1938 instead of Cyrillic. Stalin's five-year plans resulted in the resettlement of many Russians, Armenians and Georgians into the existing Abkhaz, Georgian, Greek and other minority population to work in the growing agricultural sector. A Migration Authority was established in the Georgian Communist Party in 1939 whose mission was to increase the population of Abkhazia. Abkhazia experienced collectivisation in 1936–1938, much later than most of USSR. Georgians outnumbered the Abkhazians and were the largest group (plurality) in the region during the early Soviet Union even before the Stalin's policies.

The education system in Soviet Abkhazia operated through "the special national schools" in which the Abkhaz language was taught until the fifth grade, while the middle and high schools in Abkhazia taught in Russian language. Middle and high schools in Abkhazia did not teach in the Abkhaz language because of the language's lack of scientific terminology and its limited capacity to create new words through derivational processes. On 24 January 1938, the Central Committee of the Communist Party of the Soviet Union launched the educational reform throughout the entire Soviet Union, replacing "special national schools" with "the soviet schools of ordinary type" in which the subjects were taught in "the language of relevant [union] republic or in Russian language". Abkhaz schools were closed down in 1945–1946, requiring Abkhaz children to study in the Georgian language. When the wider Soviet reform was implemented in Abkhazia, the official reasons for choosing the Georgian language rather than Russian included the "lexical similarity of Abkhaz language to Georgian language" and the "common cultural heritage" of the Abkhaz and Georgians. The Abkhaz language continued to be taught in the new reorganized Abkhaz schools as a mandatory subject.

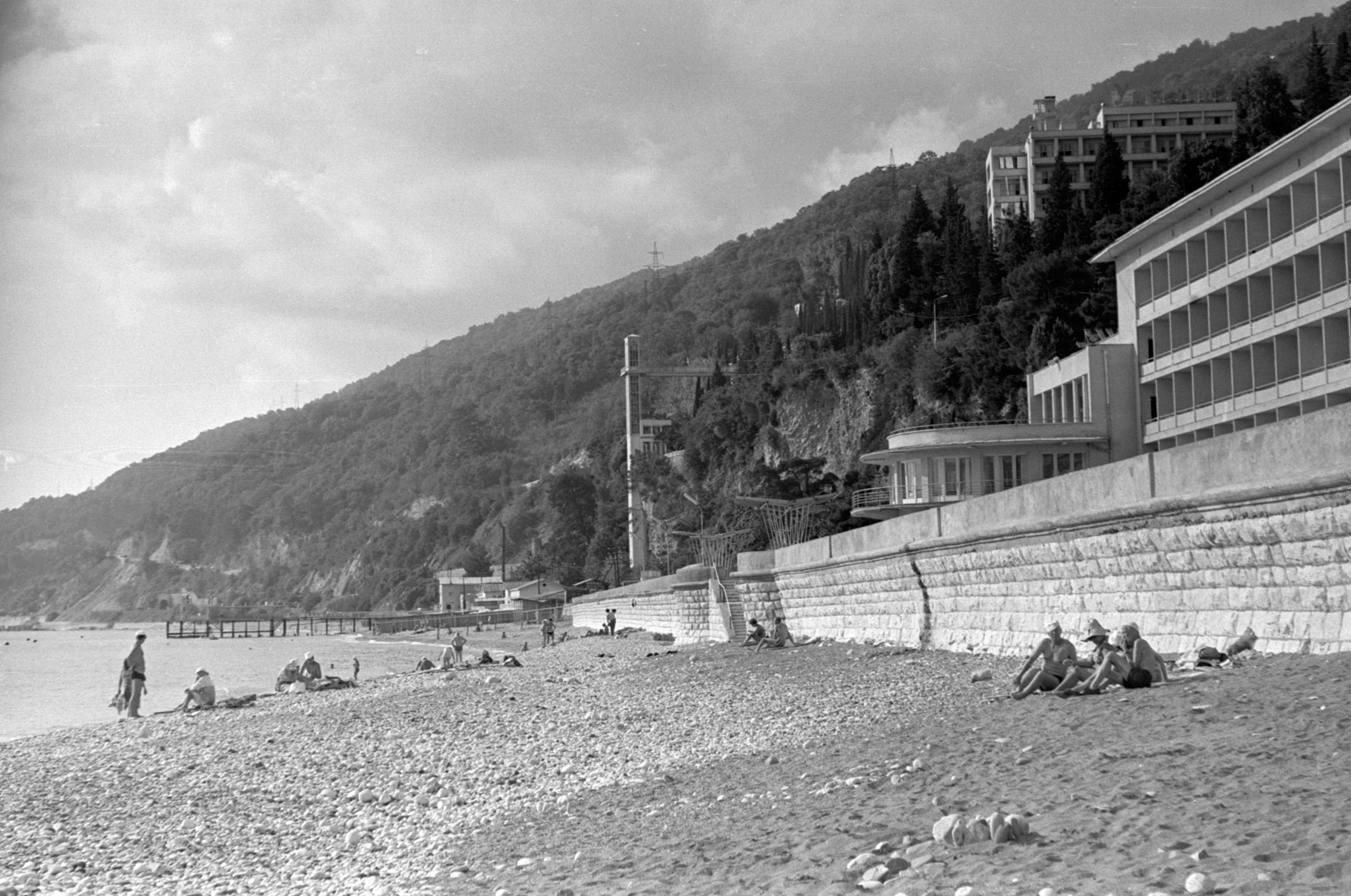
Abkhazia became a major Soviet holiday destination

There was a reversal of policies after the Stalin's death in 1953. Abkhaz schools were reopened and a new script, based on Cyrillic, was devised for the Abkhaz language in 1954. The measures were enacted which enhanced the status of selected minority languages in Georgia and Russian, and downgraded the status of Georgian in its autonomous regions. While previously the heads of the local Communist Party were ethnic Georgians, starting from the 1960s this position, the most powerful one in the autonomous republic, was always held by an Abkhaz. Ethnic Abkhaz also headed most of the government ministries and held 70% of all positions in the administration. Abkhaz ASSR was the only autonomous republic in the Soviet Union in which local language had official status.

In the following three decades, the situation in the Abkhazian ASSR shifted, and now ethnic Abkhazians were dominating the autonomous republic. They occupied many more positions in the autonomous republic compared to Georgians. During the late Soviet period, ethnic Abkhazs occupied 41% of the seats in the Abkhazian Supreme Soviet, and 67% of the republican ministers were ethnically Abkhaz. Moreover, they held even larger proportion of lower level official posts within the autonomous republic. The first secretary of the communist party in Abkhazia was also ethnically Abkhaz. All of this was despite the fact that Abkhazians made up only 17.8% of the region's population, while Georgians were 45.7% and other ethnicities (Greeks, Russians, Armenians, etc.) — 36.5%. This sharp imbalance caused the ethnic Abkhazian elite to worry about the collapse of the centralized power in Moscow and the steps towards the democratization, as this would deprive it of the dominant status.

The period was marked by attempts of the Abkhaz Communist elite to make the autonomous structures more Abkhaz, but their efforts constantly met resistance from the Georgians. Abkhaz nationalists attempted on several occasions, most notably in 1978, to convince Moscow to transfer the autonomous republic from Georgian SSR to the Russian SFSR. That year, the Abkhaz organised a series of indoor and outdoor rallies (including an all-ethnic meeting of Abkhaz in Lykhny) in response to the mass demonstrations of Georgians who had succeeded in winning for their language a constitutional status of the official language of the Georgian SSR (contrary to the Soviet plans to replace the Georgian with the Russian language). Although the Abkhaz request of the secession from Georgia was rejected Moscow, Tbilisi responded with serious economic and cultural concessions, appropriating an extra 500 million rubles (or more) over seven years for the development of infrastructure and cultural projects such as the foundation of the Abkhazian State University (with Abkhaz, Georgian, and Russian sectors), a State Folk Ensemble in Sukhumi, and Abkhaz-language television broadcasting. Substantial quotas were also given to ethnic Abkhaz in educational and official positions. Even though these concessions eased tensions only partially, they made Abkhazia prosperous even by the standards of Georgia which was one of the wealthiest Soviet republic of that time. The favourable geographic and climatic conditions were successfully exploited to make Abkhazia a destination for hundreds of thousands of tourists, gaining for the region a reputation of "Soviet Riviera."

== The Abkhazian War ==
As the Soviet Union began to disintegrate at the end of the 1980s, ethnic tensions grew between the Abkhaz and Georgians over Georgia's moves towards independence. Many Abkhaz opposed this, fearing that an independent Georgia would lead to the elimination of their autonomy, and argued instead for the establishment of Abkhazia as a separate Soviet republic in its own right. With the onset of perestroika, the agenda of Abkhaz nationalists became more radical and exclusive. In 1988, they began to ask for the reinstatement of Abkhazia's former status of Union Republic, as the submission of Abkhazia to another Union Republic was not considered to give enough guarantees of their development. They justified their request by referring to the Leninist tradition of the right of nations to self-determination, which they asserted was violated in 1931. In June 1988, a manifesto called "Abkhazian Letter" was sent to Soviet leader Mikhail Gorbachev. On 19 March 1989, a meeting organized in the village of Lykhny by the Abkhaz nationalist movement Aidgylara called for withdrawal from Georgia and remaining within the Soviet Union as a separate Soviet republic.

The dispute turned violent on 16 July 1989 in Sukhumi: At least eighteen people were killed and another 137, mostly Georgians, injured when the Soviet Georgian government gave in to Georgian popular demand to transform a Georgian sector of Abkhazian State University into a branch of Tbilisi State University and the Abkhaz nationalists, including armed groups, demonstrated at the building where the entrance examinations were being held. After several days of violence, Soviet troops restored order in the city and blamed rival nationalist paramilitaries for provoking confrontations.

In 1990, the conflict moved to the legislatures, which inaugurated the beginning of the "War of Laws" between two sides. Ethnic Abkhaz Vladislav Ardzinba was elected as Chairman by the Abkhaz Supreme Soviet in December 1990. Ardzinba, who was a charismatic but excitable figure popular among the Abkhaz, was believed by Georgians to have helped to instigate the violence of July 1989. Ardzinba managed to consolidate his power relatively quickly and reneged on pre-election promises to increase the representation of Georgians in Abkhazia's autonomous structures; since then, Ardzinba tried to rule Abkhazia relatively single-handedly, but avoided, for the time being, overt conflict with the central authorities in Tbilisi. However, Ardzinba created the Abkhazian National Guard which was mono-ethnically Abkhaz, and initiated a practice of replacing ethnic Georgians in leading positions with Abkhaz.

Georgia boycotted the March 17, 1991 all-Union referendum on the renewal of the Soviet Union proposed by Mikhail Gorbachev. However, the referendum was held in Abkhazia and 52.3% of the population of Abkhazia (virtually all the non-Georgians) took part, and participants voted by an overwhelming majority (98.6%) in favour of preserving the Union. Most of the non-Georgian population subsequently declined to participate in the March 31 referendum on Georgia's independence, which was supported by a huge majority of the population of Georgia in Abkhazia. Shortly after it Georgia declared independence on 9 April 1991, under the rule of nationalist and former Soviet dissident Zviad Gamsakhurdia.

In order to defuse tensions, Gamsakhurdia negotiated a compromise agreement in 1991 which granted a wide over-representation through ethnic quotas to the Abkhazians in the local Supreme Soviet, with Abkhazians, while being only 18% of the population, getting the largest portion of seats, exceeding representation afforded to the Georgians, the largest ethnic group in Abkhazia. A two-thirds majority was to be required to pass "important legislation" to ensure that key decisions would not be taken without approval from both Abkhaz and Georgian deputies and each side would hold veto power in principle. The elections to the Abkhazian Supreme Soviet using this scheme were held in September and October 1991.

Gamsakhurdia's rule proved to be unstable as it was soon challenged by the rebellious Georgian National Guard and a group of paramilitaries. In January 1992, Gamsakhurdia was overthrown by a military coup, being shortly replaced by a military council which ruled the country until the new civilian government was formed under former Soviet Georgian leader and Soviet foreign minister Eduard Shevardnadze, who became the country's head of state in March 1992. These developments would ultimately lead to the Georgian civil war of 1991-1993.

On 21 February 1992, Georgia's ruling Military Council announced that it was abolishing Georgia's Soviet-era constitution and restoring the 1921 Constitution of the Democratic Republic of Georgia. Many Abkhaz interpreted this as an abolition of their autonomous status, although the 1921 constitution contained a provision for the region's autonomy. The power-sharing agreement signed in 1991 proved to be unsustainable due to the increasing tensions when the Abkhaz armed formations broke into the office of ethnic Georgian Minister of Internal Affairs of Abkhazia Givi Lominadze, beat him up and forcibly removed him from his post, replacing him with an Abkhaz candidate who was approved without the consent of the Georgian deputies of the Abkhaz Supreme Soviet. This culminated in the Abkhaz Supreme Soviet restoring the Abkhaz Constitution of 1925 with a simple majority of 35 deputies out of 65, effectively declaring secession from Georgia, although the restoration of old constitution without a two-thirds majority clearly violated the power-sharing agreement.

Meanwhile, on 11 August 1992, in a hit-and-run campaign, the armed supporters of former Georgian president Zviad Gamsakhurdia kidnapped Georgian Interior Minister, Roman Gventsadze, and five other officials in the town of Zugdidi. In response, Shevardnadze sent troops to Zugdidi, which borders Abkhazia. The hostages, including the Georgian Interior Minister and security chief, were held in Abkhazia (with Sukhumi being one of the strongholds of Gamsakhurdia supporters). At the same time, the anarchy on the highway and railroad caused the frequent robbery of trains, with estimated one out of every ten trains being targeted. The Georgian government dispatched 3,000 troops to Abkhazia. Heavy fighting between Georgian forces and Abkhazian militia broke out in and around Sukhumi after the Abkhaz fired upon the Georgian troops. The Abkhazian authorities rejected the government's claims, alleging that it was merely a pretext for an "invasion". After about a week's fighting and many casualties on both sides, Georgian government forces managed to take control of most of Abkhazia, and closed down the regional parliament.

The Abkhazians' military defeat was met with a hostile response by the self-styled Confederation of Mountain Peoples of the Caucasus, an umbrella group uniting a number of movements in the North Caucasus, Russia (Chechens, Circassians, Ossetians and others). Hundreds of volunteer paramilitaries from Russia (including the then little known Shamil Basayev) joined forces with the Abkhazian separatists to fight the Georgian government forces. Russian military forces also sided with the secessionists. In October 1992, the Abkhaz and Russian paramilitaries mounted a major offensive after breaking a cease-fire, which drove the Georgian forces out of large swathes of the republic. Shevardnadze's government accused Russia of giving covert military support to the rebels with the aim of "detaching from Georgia its native territory and the Georgia-Russian frontier land". The year 1992 ended with the rebels in control of much of Abkhazia northwest of Sukhumi.

The conflict remained stalemated until July 1993, following an agreement in Sochi, when the Abkhaz separatist militias launched an abortive attack on Georgian-held Sukhumi. The capital was surrounded and heavily shelled, with Shevardnadze himself trapped in the city.

Although a truce was declared at the end of July, this collapsed after a renewed Abkhaz attack in mid-September. After ten days of heavy fighting, Sukhumi fell on 27 September 1993. Eduard Shevardnadze narrowly escaped death, having vowed to stay in the city no matter what, but he was eventually forced to flee when separatist snipers fired on the hotel where he was residing. Abkhaz, North Caucasians militants and their allies committed widespread atrocities after the Fall of Sukhumi. Large numbers of remaining Georgian civilians were murdered and their property was looted.

The separatist forces quickly overran the rest of Abkhazia as the Georgian government faced a second threat: an uprising by the supporters of the deposed Zviad Gamsakhurdia in the region of Mingrelia (Samegrelo). In the chaotic aftermath of defeat almost all ethnic Georgian population fled the region by sea or over the mountains escaping a large-scale ethnic cleansing initiated by the victors.

Many thousands died, including 2,000 civilians from the Abkhaz side and 5,000 from the Georgian side (Georgian estimates). Some 250,000 people, mostly ethnic Georgians were forced into exile. During the war, gross human rights violations were reported to have been done by both sides, and the ethnic cleansing committed by the Abkhaz forces and their allies is recognised by the Organization for Security and Cooperation in Europe (OSCE) Summits in Budapest (1994), Lisbon (1996) and Istanbul (1999)

== Post-war Abkhazia ==
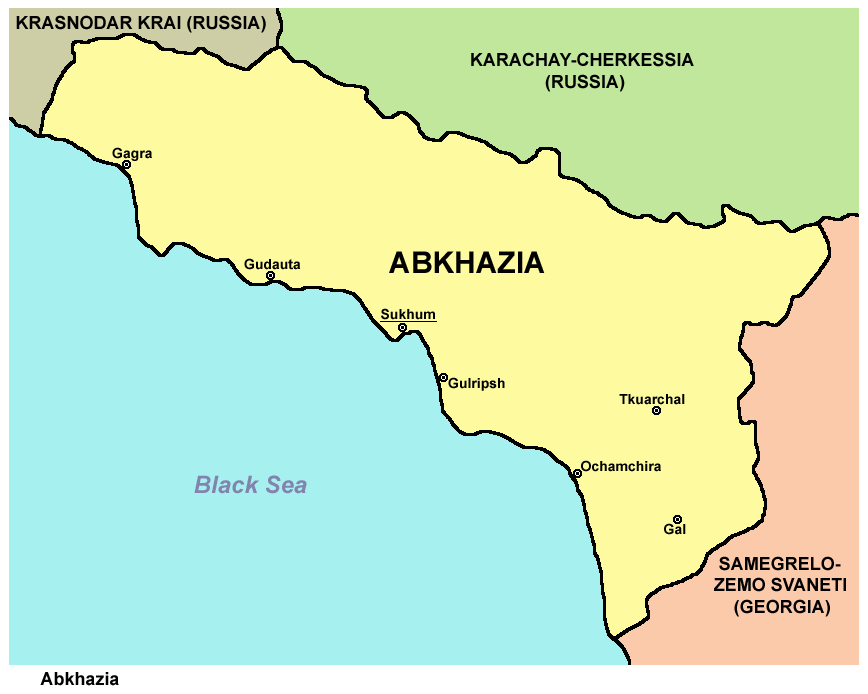
Map of modern Abkhazia

The economic situation in the republic after war was very hard and it was aggravated by the sanctions imposed by its neighbours. After Georgia's entry into the Russian-led Commonwealth of Independent States in October 1993, Georgia and Russia closed the borders of Abkhazia to the movement of goods in 1993 and 1994 respectively. Additionally, Russia prohibited all male Abkhazians between 16 and 60 years old from crossing the border. In 1996 the Commonwealth of Independent States banned transport, trade, and financial ties with Abkhazia at state level. During the 1990s numerous people of all ethnicities left Abkhazia mainly for Russia. In 1997 Russia partially lifted sanctions on Abkhazia by permitting some imports which was protested by Georgia. In 1999, Abkhazia officially declared its independence, which was recognized by no other nation.

Following the war, the Russian peacekeeping force was stationed in Abkhazia in June 1994, ostensibly under the aegis of the Commonwealth of Independent States, although the Russian army was accused of breaching the peacekeeping norms by refusing to assist in the safe return of the Georgian refugees to Abkhazia, maintaining ties with the Abkhaz forces, "essentially aiding the cause of the separatist Abkhazian leadership" and turning into "border guards for Abkhazia".

The return of Georgians to Gali district of Abkhazia was halted by the fighting which broke out there in 1998. However, from 40,000 to 60,000 refugees have returned to Gali district since 1998, including persons commuting daily across the ceasefire line and those migrating seasonally in accordance with agricultural cycles.

After several peaceful years tourists again began to visit Abkhazia, however their number is only about a half of the pre-war number.

In 2004 presidential elections were held which caused much controversy when the candidate backed by outgoing president Vladislav Ardzinba and by Russia - Raul Khadjimba - was apparently defeated by Sergey Bagapsh. The tense situation in the republic led to the cancellation of the election results by the Supreme Court. After that the deal was struck between former rivals to run jointly — Bagapsh as a presidential candidate and Khajimba as a vice presidential candidate. They received more than 90% of the votes in the new election.

After the 1992-1993 war the Upper Kodori Valley was the only part of Abkhazia that was not controlled by the Abkhazian secessionist government. It remained under the formal control of Georgian authorities however it was mainly run by a local strongman Emzar Kvitsiani. As a result of the 2006 Kodori crisis Georgia reasserted its power in the valley. Abkhazians claimed that the infiltration of the territory by Georgian armed units was a violation of the Agreement on the Ceasefire and Disengagement of Forces of May 14, 1994, however Georgia maintained that only police and security forces were employed there and thus the agreement was properly observed.

August 2008 saw another crisis over South Ossetia between Georgia and Russia. The violence spread somewhat into the Abkhazia region again, with added stress created by the Russian forces massing. As a result of operation conducted by Abkhaz and Russian forces in August 2008, the Abkhaz forces occupied Kodori Valley, which coincided with the Russo-Georgian war in South Ossetia. Georgia and Russia signed a cease-fire soon requiring Russia to withdraw from Georgian territory. However, soon after Russia issued recognition of independence of Abkhazia and South Ossetia.

Meanwhile, the efforts of Russia to isolate Georgian population in Abkhazia from the rest of Georgia continued. On 24 October 2008 the railroad bridge of Shamgon-Tagiloni, connecting the city of Zugdidi in Georgia with the Abkhazian Gali district (populated mainly by Georgians) was destroyed. According to Georgian and French sources it was done by Russian army; Abkhazian sources maintained it was a Georgian diversion. Per Georgian sources on 29 October 2008 Russian forces dismantled another bridge - the one situated between the villages of Orsantia and Otobaia and linking a total of five villages - Otobaia, Pichori, Barghebi, Nabakevi and Gagida, thus the local population was deprived of the opportunity to move freely in the region.

After the unexpected death of Abkhazian President Sergei Bagapsh on 29 May 2011 after lung surgery, Vice-President Alexander Ankvab became an acting president until winning election in his own right later in 2011.

Russia to this day maintains a major military and economic presence in Abkhazia, and the relationship between the two has been described as asymmetrical, with Abkhazia being heavily dependent on Russia. Half of Abkhazia's budget comes from Russian funding (with most of financial aid coming in the form of loans), much of its state structure is integrated with Russia, it uses the Russian ruble, its foreign policy is coordinated with Russia, and a majority of its citizens have Russian passports as a result of Russia's passportization policy since early 2000s. Abkhazia has adopted Russian technical and commercial standards, and large part of its infrastructure is owned by Russian companies, with Russia heavily investing in the military infrastructure. The 2014 Treaty on Alliance and Strategic Partnership obliges Abkhazia to coordinate its foreign policy with Russia and merge the armed forces.

On 27 May 2014, thousands of protesters, led by Raul Khajimba, rallied against Ankvab in Sukhumi, accusing him of "authoritarian" rule, inappropriate spending of Russian aid funds, and of failure to tackle corruption and economic problems, and demanded his resignation. One of the other issues that sparked the rebellion was Ankvab's relatively liberal citizenship policy (he allowed ethnic Georgians to register as voters and receive Abkhazian passports). Within hours, the protesters stormed the presidential headquarters and forced Ankvab to flee Sukhumi to a Russian military base in Gudauta. Ankvab denounced the events in Sukhumi as an "armed coup attempt" and refused to resign. The Russian government dispatched Vladimir Putin's aide Vladislav Surkov to mediate between the opposition and Ankvab's government. On 31 May, the Parliament of Abkhazia declared Ankvab "unable" to perform his presidential duties, appointed the parliamentary chairman Valery Bganba as an interim president and called snap presidential election for 24 August. On 1 June 2014, Ankvab stepped down as president.

Raul Khajimba went on to win the 2019 Abkhazian presidential election, but this prompted protests and in January 2020 the Abkhazian Supreme Court annulled the results. Khajimba resigned the presidency on 12 January, and new elections were called for 22 March. Aslan Bzhania entered these elections and won with 59% of the vote, becoming the president of Abkhazia.

The 2021 Abkhazia unrest was against Bzhania.

In November 2024, large protests took place against the investment agreement between Abkhazia and Russia. On 15 November, protesters seized the building of the People's Assembly of Abkhazia and demanded Bzhania's resignation. Bzhania refused to resign. On 16 November, the Abkhazian opposition claimed that Bzhania had fled to an unknown location, while his press team announced that Bzhania was in his native village of Tamishi, and not at a Russian military base as previously rumoured. On 19 November 2024, after four days of protesters seizing government buildings and negotiations between the government and the opposition, President Aslan Bzhania and Prime Minister Alexander Ankvab resigned. Vice President Badra Gunba became acting president.

A snap election was held in February-March 2025. Badra Gunba won the second round on 1 March with 55% of the vote.

== See also ==
- Abkhazia conflict

== Sources ==
- Bozkurt, Giray Saynur (2014). Blue Black Sea: New Dimensions of History, Security, Politics, Strategy, Energy and Economy. Cambridge Scholars Publishing. ISBN 9781443864756.
- Hille, Charlotte (2010). State Building and Conflict Resolution in the Caucasus. Brill. ISBN 9789004179011.
- Saparov, Arsène (2014). From Conflict to Autonomy in the Caucasus: The Soviet Union and the Making of Abkhazia, South Ossetia and Nagorno Karabakh. Taylor & Francis. ISBN 9781317637844.
- Jones, Stephen, ed. (2014). The Making of Modern Georgia, 1918-2012: The First Georgian Republic and its Successors. Routledge. ISBN 9781317815938.
- Jones, Stephen Francis (2026). The First Social Democracy: The Democratic Republic of Georgia, 1918-1921. Harvard University Press. ISBN 978-0-674-30410-9.
