= 2024 Abkhazian protests =

Protests in Abkhazia in response to arrest

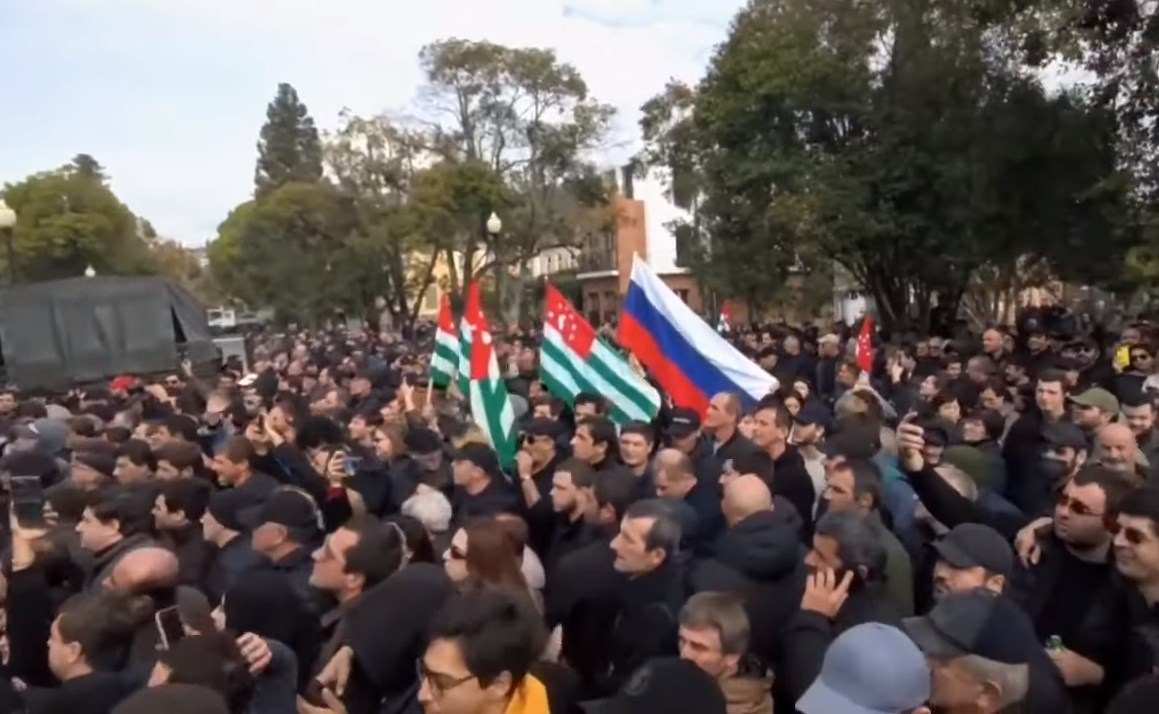
- Demonstrators protesting in front of the de facto parliament.
- Date: 11–12 November 2024 (first phase); 15–19 November 2024 (second phase)
- Location: Republic of Abkhazia, mainly Sukhumi
- Caused by: Opposition to the Abkhazia–Russia investment agreement; Opposition to President Aslan Bzhania; Detention of opposition activists (first phase)
- Goals: Cancellation of the investment agreement; Resignation of Bzhania and his government; Release of opposition activists (first phase)
- Methods: Protests; Demonstrations; Civil disobedience; Traffic obstruction
- Result: Resignation of Aslan Bzhania; Badra Gunba becomes acting president of Abkhazia; Snap presidential election

Parties
(Abkhazia) Coordination Council for Overcoming the Political Crisis: Forum for the National Unity of Abkhazia; Abkhaz People's Movement; Sovereignty Protection Committee; Aruaa; Apsny; Our Capital	(Abkhazia) Government: President; Parliament; Security Council; Internal Affairs Ministry; State Security Service; Supported by: Amtsakhara; Aitaira

Lead figures
Collective leadership Adgur Ardzinba; Aslan Bartsits; Kan Kvarchia; Levan Mikaa; Eshsou Kakalia; Temur Gulia	Aslan Bzhania; Badra Gunba; Alexander Ankvab; Lasha Ashuba; Raul Lolua; Dmitry Kuchuberia; Robert Kiut; Otar Khetsia; David Pilia; Leonid Lakerbaia

Number
15 November: ~5,000; 16 November: 10,000	

Casualties
- Injuries: 15 November: ≥9

Protests in the partially recognized Republic of Abkhazia began on 11 November 2024 after the arrest of five opposition activists who opposed an investment agreement with Russia. Protesters blocked roads in Sukhumi and attempted to storm the State Security Service building, demanding the release of detainees. On 12 November the activists were released. However, the protests continued with even greater force on 15 November, when protesters broke into the buildings of Parliament, Government and the Presidential Administration, making another demand for the resignation of President Aslan Bzhania and his government, which left for the village of Tamishi before eventually announcing its resignation after four days of negotiations, with Vice President Badra Gunba becoming acting president.

Opposition representatives claimed that the protest was not aimed at worsening the relations between Russia and Abkhazia, but stated that Bzhania "has been trying to use these relations for his own selfish interests, manipulating them for the sake of strengthening his regime".

Despite the victory of the protesters and the resignation of Aslan Bzhania, Adgur Ardzinba, the protest leader and the opposition presidential candidate, did not manage to secure victory in the 2025 Abkhazian presidential election, which was won by Badra Gunba, Bzhania's Vice-President and the candidate of the ruling camp, although he agreed with revising the agreement with Russia and distanced himself from Bzhania, while also receiving support from Russia.

== Background ==
=== Investment agreement ===
On 30 October 2024, Russian Minister of Economic Development Maxim Reshetnikov and Deputy Prime Minister of Abkhazia Kristina Ozgan signed an agreement allowing Russian companies to implement investment projects in the Republic of Abkhazia. The agreement provides for a number of benefits and support measures for Russian investors who want to finance projects in Abkhazia. Among them are temporary exemptions from customs duties, property taxes and profit taxes, a value-added tax rate of 5% (this is half the standard rate), and others. The minimum threshold for such investment projects is two billion rubles. The agreement is part of the program to harmonize the legislation of Russia and Abkhazia, which was initiated back in 2020.

The Abkhaz opposition criticized the bill, calling for "protection of Abkhazia's national interests, its natural resources and wealth, which Bzhania tried to usurp for personal gain". Opponents of the agreement also note that it will not bring benefits to Abkhazia. Abkhaz opposition politician Adgur Ardzinba stated that "this agreement is designed to exempt foreign oligarchs from taxes for up to 25 years ... Why do we need such investment projects that will not bring a penny to the budget for a quarter of a century?" at a press conference of heads of public and political organizations opposing the agreement. On the other hand, the Abkhaz authorities believed that the investment agreement would help the Abkhaz economy.

=== Detention of opposition activists ===
On 11 November 2024, the People's Assembly of Abkhazia adopted a law on regulating the status of multifunctional complexes on the territory of the country, which, among other things, refers to the investment agreement.

On the evening of November 11, four people were detained by security forces; according to TASS, these were former MPs Garry Kokaya, Almaskhan Ardzinba, Ramaz Jopua, as well as opposition activist Omar Smyr. The chairman of the opposition Forum for the National Unity of Abkhazia party, Aslan Bartsits, said that five opposition activists were detained. He said that "they were returning from a public meeting in the Gudauta District dedicated to the recently signed Russian-Abkhazian agreement on investment activity... they were detained". He called the incident "persecution for political reasons." According to the pro-government Telegram channel AMRA-life and to the General Prosecutor's Office of Abkhazia, "the detainees were involved in an incident near the building of the Abkhaz Parliament, during which MP Almas Akaba was beaten. In addition, the oppositionists called on the public in Gudauta to violently change the government."

More than 10 security officials took part in the detention, which the Abkhaz opposition called "illegal and unjustifiably harsh". According to the Abkhaz Telegram channel "Respublika," relatives were not allowed to see the detainees, and there was no information about their condition.

== Events ==
=== 11–12 November ===
On the evening of 11 November, protesters gathered at the State Security Service (SGB) building, demanding the release of those detained. Other groups of protesters blocked the central highway and three bridges at the exits from Sukhumi: Kodori, Upper Gumista and Lower Gumista. There were periodic scuffles between opposition supporters and SGB officers, with protesters attempting to break down the gates and break into SGB territory. Military equipment was pulled up to the residence of the president of Abkhazia.

Following the blocking of roads and the attempted storming of the SGB building, Abkhazian President Aslan Bzhania held an emergency meeting of the Security Council. Security Council Secretary Raul Lolua stated that the actions taken by the opposition were "of a criminal nature". SGB chief Dmitry Kuchuberia called the events at his agency's building "mass riots".

Closer to the night, the main part of the protesters moved to Freedom Square. The opposition said it would hold protests against the ratification of the investment agreement on 15 November near the Parliament building.

On the morning of 12 November, after a promise from MP Beslan Emurkhba and the head of the Ochamchira District Beslan Bigvava to facilitate the release of detained activists from the pre-trial detention center, protesters unblocked the Kodori Bridge. However, later a RIA Novosti correspondent reported that the bridge had been blocked again. During negotiations with protesters, member of the Public Chamber of Abkhazia Sokrat Jinjolia said that the authorities are ready to release all detained opposition activists in exchange for the opening of bridges.

On the afternoon of 12 November, all five opposition activists were released. Earlier it became known that the Sukhumi City Court received materials on three detained opposition representatives (Kokaia, Ardzinba and Jopua). They were charged with petty hooliganism, but the court terminated the proceedings "due to the absence of an administrative violation". Materials on Smyr and Gvaramia were not received by the court. Former MP Tengiz Agrba, who was detained on November 9 and the opposition also demanded his release, was also released. After the release of the oppositionists, the bridges were finally unblocked for traffic.

=== 15 November ===
On the morning of November 15, hundreds of protesters came to the Parliament building when deputies were going to consider the ratification of the investment agreement. The protesters brought Abkhazian and Russian flags to the action, according to them "as a sign of friendship and support for strengthening Abkhazia–Russia relations". The opposition also issued a statement that "the actions of the protesters are not directed against Russo-Abkhaz relations". According to Respublica, several thousand people took part in the protest.

One of the opposition leaders, Chairman of the Abkhaz People's Movement Adgur Ardzinba reported that a group of MPs came to the speaker and insisted that the issue of ratifying the investment agreement be removed from the agenda. He also called on the republic's authorities to "postpone all pressing issues that divide the people until the upcoming 2025 presidential election", and stated that if the authorities do not do this, "all responsibility for possible consequences in the coming days falls entirely on the President of Abkhazia Aslan Bzhania and his entourage".

Ultimately, the Parliament did not approve its agenda, and the 15 November session was cancelled by the Speaker Lasha Ashuba. The Parliamentary session, according to reports, lasted less than 10 minutes. However, the protesters demanded that the deputies hold a session and vote against approving the draft agreement. Soon they also demanded Bzhania's resignation. Soon, clashes and fights broke out near the Parliament building between protesters and police officers, who had been brought in to provide enhanced security for the building. The protesters threw eggs at the security forces, and also broke down the fence around the building and broke into the territory. In response, law enforcement officers sprayed tear gas and began throwing smoke bombs into the crowd. The security forces also tried to block the passage to the Parliament territory with a fire service truck. Some security officers reportedly defected to the protesters.

It was also reported that shots were heard in the area of the Parliament building. The chief doctor of the Sukhumi Ambulance Service reported two people were injured in clashes near the Parliament building, but did not specify the cause of their injuries. According to the Abkhazian Ministry of Health, eight people were injured in the clashes and were taken to the Republican Hospital. After receiving medical assistance, seven of them were released for outpatient treatment. Emergency services later said at least nine people had been taken to hospital.

After the protesters got close to the Parliament building, the head of the personal security of the president, Aslan Bzhania, came out to them and promised to convey to him the demands of the protesters. The head of the SGB, Dmitry Kuchuberia, and the minister of internal affairs, Robert Kiut, also tried to negotiate with the protesters. After this, protesters surrounded a complex of government buildings, including the building of the Presidential Administration. According to one of the leaders of the Abkhaz opposition, Eshsou Kakalia, "the territory around the Bzhania government complex is controlled by protesters. The President left the building of his administration together with his guards. Kakalia also pointed out that the events in Sukhumi are "an internal matter of the republic and were provoked exclusively by the anti-people actions of the current government." According to preliminary information, members of the People's Assembly left the Parliament building.

Shortly after the seizure of the Parliament, government and Presidential Administration buildings, the press service of the head of Abkhazia reported that the Presidential Administration was preparing a document on the withdrawal of the bill on ratification of the investment agreement from Parliament. The press service stated that "this decision was made in order to stabilize the situation in the republic".

However, negotiations on the withdrawal of the bill dragged on. The united opposition and public organizations formed a Coordination Council for Overcoming the Political Crisis. Speaker of Parliament Lasha Ashuba and MPs held talks with the president in the SGB building, after which they returned to Parliament. The parties discussed possible candidates for the post of acting head of Abkhazia until new presidential elections are held. Supporters of the government proposed Vice President Badra Gunba for this position, while the opposition proposed Speaker of Parliament Lasha Ashuba or another neutral candidate who would suit both sides. A representative of the Abkhaz opposition stated that Aslan Bzhania did not give a specific answer to the demand for his resignation and stated that he needed time to think.

However, Aslan Bzhania later stated that he refused to resign. Bzhania stated that he, the vice president and the prime minister, as well as members of the government, "are on the ground, in Abkhazia, and will continue to work". After Bzhania's statement, the opposition gave him an ultimatum: to resign within an hour. An opposition representative, leader of the Sovereignty Protection Committee, Hero of Abkhazia Levan Mikaa stated, "If [Bzhania] does not resign, we will go to where he is". Opposition MP Kan Kvarchia also said that the opposition had completely stopped negotiations with the authorities and now intends to "build up strength".

Government media reported that after his address, Bzhania held a meeting with security forces. Opposition Telegram channels wrote that he tried to convene a meeting of the Security Council and give the order to storm government buildings, but security forces refused to carry out this.

=== 16 November ===
The presidential press service said Bzhania was in his home village of Tamishi and rejected claims that he had relocated to a Russian military base after his address. The press service also stated that Bzhania did not sign the document on the withdrawal of the bill on ratification of the investment agreement from Parliament. Coordination Council representative Levan Mikaa stated that if the President does not get in touch by the morning, the Parliament will consider the issue of his resignation.

On the morning of 16 November, President Bzhania held a meeting with his supporters in Tamishi. Bzhania said he is ready to resign when the protesters left the government buildings complex in Sukhumi. He added that his Vice President Badra Gunba would become acting president, and Bzhania would put his candidacy for snap presidential election. However, the protesters rejected Bzhania's proposals and refused to leave the government quarter they had occupied. Opposition leaders called on people to stand with them until Bzhania resigns. One of the opposition leaders, Levan Mikaa, said that about 5,000 people took part in the protest on 15 November, and that "more and more people are coming to participate in the protest every evening".

=== 17 November ===
On 17 November, President Bzhania, still located with his supporters in Tamishi, told TASS that he was staying in his post. According to him, the Abkhazian authorities had failed to find a compromise with the opposition on any issues. He called the protests a coup attempt.

As a result of negotiations, the protesters also returned to the Defense Ministry the military trucks that had been placed around the government building complex by security forces before the unrest began. One of the opposition leaders, at a meeting with Acting Defense Minister Beslan Tsvizhba, said that "military equipment should be used to ensure the security of the republic and should be where it belongs," but not to counter popular discontent. Earlier, protesters used these same trucks to ram the gates of the parliament and the presidential administration and enter the buildings.

Later, the protesters, who still control the government building complex, tore down the fences and barriers around them. Levan Lagulaa, a representative of the Sovereignty Protection Committee, said that one section of the fence would be left standing, with a sign on it that reads "as a warning to future rulers of Abkhazia that we must be with the people, and not fence ourselves off from them".

On the afternoon of 17 November, Bzhania warned that residents of Abkhazia could soon be left without electricity due to the actions of protesters. According to him, the government should resolve the issue of providing people with electricity. A representative of the opposition, the chairman of the Aruaa organization, Temur Gulia, said that "we cannot leave things as they are, because we are thinking about the people and the state, which must live" and that civil servants should take their jobs and work again starting on Monday. Gulia also stated that to this end the opposition intends to form a temporary cabinet to ensure the functioning of the government, and that a number of current ministers could be included in the temporary government.

On the evening of 17 November, a meeting was held between a group of deputies of the Abkhazian parliament, headed by the speaker Lasha Ashuba, and representatives of the working group of the public chamber, headed by Sokrat Jinjolia. The deputies and the public chamber discussed joint actions to resolve the political crisis in the country, including mediation efforts. According to experts, by that time two centers of power had formed in Abkhazia, sharing irreconcilable positions: the opposition, which controls, basically, only the government quarter in Sukhumi, and the president, who exercises power over the country from his native village of Tamishi. Under these conditions, the threat of armed conflict between the two parties remains.

=== 18 November ===
On the night of 17–18 November, there was shooting near the building of the Abkhazian State Television and Radio Broadcasting Company. According to the press service of President Bzhania, "a group of unknown persons in 15 cars opened fire in the air in the immediate vicinity of the Abkhaz television studio while employees were inside, thereby creating a tense situation." According to another version of the president's information center, the shooting was opened by security personnel to protect themselves from "a group of persons presumably representing opposition forces" who arrived there to establish control over the broadcast. The information center later stated that the situation had been stabilized and work "continued as normal". Although no one was hurt, the incident was reported to be the first time firearms were used during the current crisis.

On the evening of 18 November, under the moderation of the Speaker of Parliament Lasha Ashuba, direct negotiations between representatives of the government and the opposition began in the building of the Ministry of Defense. Bzhania's side was represented at the meeting by Vice President Badra Gunba, Chairman of the State Customs Committee Otar Khetsia and member of the Public Chamber David Pilia. The opposition was represented in the negotiations by Adgur Ardzinba, Kan Kvarchia and Levan Mikaa. As reported earlier, the opposition agreed that Gunba would act as president after the resignation of Aslan Bzhania, but they wanted to discuss a number of other issues with him.

It has been reported that the Russian backed militia, the Wild Division, which had been fighting in the Donbas since 2014, were sent to Abkhazia, with their commander Akhra Avidzba posting about his return on Facebook.

=== 19 November ===
On the night of 18–19 November, negotiations between the government and the opposition, which lasted more than seven hours, were completed. Following the negotiations, Aslan Bzhania submitted a resignation letter to the Speaker of Parliament Lasha Ashuba. A scan of the document was also published by Bzhania's press service. However, Aslan Bzhania threatened to withdraw his resignation letter if the protesters did not vacate the seized government buildings. The resignation letter was accepted by the Abkhazian parliament on the same day. Following Bzhania's resignation, Vice President Badra Gunba became acting president. The Prime Minister Alexander Ankvab and the Head of the State Protective Service Dmitry Dbar also resigned. Parliament Speaker Lasha Ashuba stated that early presidential elections would be held in Abkhazia and that their date would be determined.

== Aftermath ==
On 28 November 2024, the People's Assembly of Abkhazia announced that new presidential elections would be held on 15 February 2025, with the winner to be inaugurated within the next 30 days of the results being declared.

On December 6, Abkhaz authorities announced that nearly all Russian funding had been suspended, except for pension payments. On the same day, Valeri Bganba reported that Russia had banned the import of tangerines from Abkhazia, citing the presence of a harmful insect.

Abkhazia had been purchasing electricity from Russia since November 1 to address an energy deficit caused by low water levels at the Enguri dam, which powers the region's largest hydroelectric facility. However, the imported electricity from Russia was insufficient to meet the region's needs, leading authorities to impose daily 10-hour power cuts starting Monday.

On December 11, the Enguri hydroelectric power station, partially located in Abkhazia, ceased operations due to critically low water levels in a nearby reservoir, according to an Abkhaz energy company. The region has been facing persistent energy shortages, compounded by strained relations with Russia. Moscow scaled back financial support, including funding for the energy sector, after Abkhazia's local council rejected a proposed investment agreement with Russia.

=== Parliament shooting ===
On December 11, Adgur Kharazia, a member of parliament and former mayor of Sukhumi, allegedly opened fire on his political rivals inside the People's Assembly of Abkhazia, killing lawmaker Vakhtang Golandzia and injuring another, Kan Kvarchia, before fleeing the scene.

== Reactions ==
- Russia: After the storming of the Abkhaz Parliament, the Russian Foreign Ministry announced that it recommended that its citizens refrain from traveling to Abkhazia, including for tourism, and also exercise increased caution, not approaching places of unrest, and, if possible, leaving the country. Foreign Ministry spokesperson Maria Zakharova stated that a crisis situation had developed in Abkhazia, and that "the Russian side, without interfering in the internal processes in Abkhazia, expects that the situation that has arisen will be resolved exclusively by peaceful political means. At the same time, of course, the laws of Abkhazia must be strictly observed, including in terms of maintaining public order". Russian Foreign Ministry also cited Zakharova as accusing the Abkhaz opposition of exceeding legal means and "provoking an escalation".
- Georgia: President Salome Zourabichvili responded to the tensions by condemning Russia for "taking accelerated steps toward annexation" of Abkhazia. She stated that Russia was trying to pass "Russian law" in Abkhazia and expressed solidarity with the "civil society protesting against the law". Parliamentary speaker Shalva Papuashvili attributed the instability to the foreign occupation and dysfunctional institutions in the region. He stated that "grey zones created by occupation regimes are invariably sources of destabilization".

== See also ==
- 2021 Abkhazia unrest
- 2014 Abkhazian Revolution
- Political crisis in Abkhazia (2020)
- List of protests in the 21st century
- List of attacks on legislatures
