= Adgur Ardzinba =

Abkhazian politician

- Адгәыр Арӡынба; Адгур Ардзинба
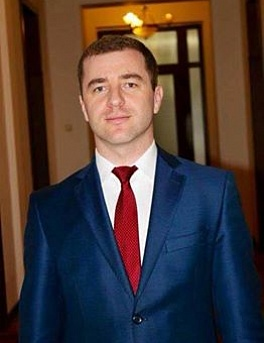
- Ardzinba in 2017

Minister for Economy of Abkhazia
- In office 8 April 2015 – 23 April 2020
- President: Raul Khajimba; Valeri Bganba; Aslan Bzhania
- Preceded by: Nikolai Achba
- Prime Minister: Artur Mikvabia; Shamil Adzynba; Beslan Bartsits; Gennady Gagulia; Daur Arshba; Valeri Bganba

Personal details
- Born: 26 December 1981 (age 44) Gudauta, Abkhaz ASSR, Georgian SSR, Soviet Union

Adgur Amiranovich Ardzinba (Abkhaz: Адгәыр Амиран-иԥа Арӡынба; Russian: Адгур Амиранович Ардзинба; Georgian: ადგურ ამირანის ძე არძინბა; born 26 December 1981) is an Abkhazian politician, formerly the Minister for Economy of Abkhazia from 2015 to 2020.

== Early life ==
Ardzinba was born on 26 December 1981 in Gudauta, which was then part of the Georgian SSR. After graduating from secondary school, he attended Kabardino-Balkarian State University in Nalchik, Russia, from 2001 to 2007. He majored in industrial and civil construction at the university. Afterwards, he decided to do postgraduate studies at Volgograd State Technical University, from which he received a PhD in economic sciences.

In 2010, after graduating, he became a senior lecturer on national economy and economic theory at Abkhazian State University, a position he has continued to hold. A year later, he was appointed an adviser on economic affairs to the Chairman of the State Customs Committee, which is the organisation responsible for protecting the border, which he did until 2013. He was also simultaneously appointed Chief Specialist of the Foreign Economic Relations Department to the Ministry for Economy. In 2013, he became Head of the Foreign Economic Relations Department.

== Minister for Economy of Abkhazia ==
Ardzinba was appointed by President Raul Khajimba on 8 April 2015, succeeding Nikolai Achba. As Minister for Economy, he announced plans to launch an own Abkhaz cryptocurrency in a bid to avoid potential sanctions and attract international investment. “The advantage of this cryptocurrency market has to do with the fact that any citizen in the entire world can invest in our economy, not fearing sanctions or other awkward limitations placed on us by the international community,” he said to Apsnypress late 2017. One year later, rampant cryptocurrency mining threatened the shaky electrical network in the republic, forcing officials to call for putting regulatory shackles on the money-making scheme in order to stave off power supply interruptions during the winter 2018/2019. Ardzinba, however, stuck to the cryptocurrency plans and said to Meduza that "given the limitations associated with the status of the republic, … we always seek nonconventional solutions to reach an acceptable level of economic development.” Apparently, Ardzinba had sought support for his cryptocurrency plans by the Russian government.

== Presidential candidate ==
In 2020, he competed in the 2020 Abkhazian presidential election for the Forum for the National Unity of Abkhazia. He lost against Aslan Bzhania and only received 36.9% of the votes. One month later, Bzhania, as the new president, dismissed Ardzinba.

After the success of Bzhania, Ardzinba criticized his government and implied that worsened Abkhazia–Russia relations were the reason for the financial problems of Abkhazia.

Ardzinba ran again in the 2025 Abkhazian presidential election as the candidate of the Abkhaz People's Movement. He supported the prior 2024 Abkhazian protests against President Aslan Bzhania. He also stated in the same interview that he thinks that more power should be granted to the assembly. Addressing foreign relations, he stated that prospects for reconciliation with Georgia would not be normalised unless Georgia recognizes Abkhazia's independence. He replaced MP Kan Kvarchia, who withdrew citing health issues following injuries sustained in the 2024 Parliament of Abkhazia shooting on 19 December. He lost in the runoff vote on 1 March to acting president Badra Gunba.

In April 2025 Ardzinba was detained at the Russian-Abkhaz border near Psou River, reportedly without explanation. He was again arrested by Russia in June and sentenced to 15 days of administrative detention, but was granted amnesty after 3 days in custody following a petition. He was arrested on charges of driving without a license after a traffic violation.
