= COVID-19 pandemic in Abkhazia =

Details of ongoing viral pandemic in Republic of Abkhazia

- Disease: COVID-19
- Pathogen: SARS-CoV-2
- Location: Abkhazia
- Index case: Gagra
- Arrival date: 7 April 2020 (6 years, 4 months and 1 day)
- Confirmed cases: 28,276 (as of 6 October 2021)
- Recovered: 23,150
- Deaths: 421

Government website
- https://minzdrav.apsny.land/

The COVID-19 pandemic was confirmed to have reached Abkhazia (Note: The political status of Abkhazia is disputed. Having unilaterally declared independence from Georgia in 1992, Abkhazia is formally recognised as an independent state by 4 UN member states (three other states previously recognised it but then withdrew their recognition), while the remainder of the international community recognizes it as de jure Georgian territory. Georgia continues to claim the area as its own territory, designating it as Russian-occupied territory.) in April 2020.

== Background ==
On 12 January 2020, the World Health Organization (WHO) confirmed that a novel coronavirus was the cause of a respiratory illness in a cluster of people in Wuhan City, Hubei Province, China, which was reported to the WHO on 31 December 2019.

The case fatality ratio for COVID-19 has been much lower than SARS of 2003, but the transmission has been significantly greater, with a significant total death toll.

== Timeline ==
=== March 2020 ===
On 28 March, the Acting President closed the border on the river Psou to Russia for foreign citizens and stateless persons. On 30 March, a case was confirmed in a person who arrived from Moscow, Russia. The test, however, was conducted in Zugdidi, Georgia, where the patient is being treated. Abkhazia itself had no confirmed cases at the time.

Georgia opened a new hospital in Rukhi, close to the border, which offered free treatment to Abkhazians. While this was planned before the pandemic, its opening occurred alongside other low-level medical assistance from Georgia to Abkhazia due to the pandemic.

=== April 2020 ===
On 7 April, the first case was confirmed. The infected patient arrived in Gagra, Abkhazia's westernmost town, after having returned from a trip to Moscow. Later, on 8 April, the second case was confirmed, caused by the first case. On 11 April, a third case was confirmed, caused by the first two cases.

On 26 April, the first death from the virus was confirmed in Gudauta. The patient was the third confirmed case back on 11 April.

=== May 2020 ===
On 8 May, four more cases were confirmed, all being cadets from Russian military academies who arrived in Sukhumi several days before and were undergoing quarantine, bringing the total of confirmed cases to seven. The following day, two more cases were confirmed, both also being cadets, bringing the total to nine. On 11 May, one more case was confirmed, bringing the total to 10. On 12 May, three more cases were confirmed, bringing the total to 13. On 13 May, two more cases were confirmed, bringing the total to 15.

Two more cases were confirmed on 14 May, one being a Russian university student, and the other being a serviceman from Dagestan stationed in Gudauta, bringing the total to 17. On 17 May, a family of three tested positive for the virus in Sokhumi, bringing the total to 20. On 19 May, four more people tested positive, all Russian students who had recently returned to Abkhazia, bringing the total to 24. On 20 May, one more case was confirmed in a cadet at a Russian military academy, bringing the total to 25. On 22 May, three more cases were confirmed, all in cadets from Russian military academies, bringing the total to 28.

=== June 2020 ===
As of 9 June, 36 cases had been identified, eight of which had been hospitalized.

=== August 2020 ===
The closure of the border with Russia had huge economic repercussions due to the loss of tourism. On August 1, the Abkhaz government re-opened the border to Russia. In the following weeks, the infection rate rose from 32 in late July to 121 on August 18.

=== September 2020 ===
As of 17 September, a total of 782 people in Abkhazia had been infected with COVID-19 and 7 had died.

=== October 2020 ===
In October, Abkhaz Defence Minister Vladimir Anua asked Russia to deploy a military field hospital in Abkhazia in order to cope with the pandemic. The request was granted.

=== November 2020 ===
During his visit in Moscow, Abkhaz president Aslan Bzhania met with Hazret Sovmen, the former president of the Republic of Adygea. Sovmen promised Bzhania 50 million rubles ($631,000) to Abkhazia to fight the coronavirus.

=== December 2020 ===
During another visit in Moscow, Abkhaz president Aslan Bzhania secured the sending of a batch of the Russian vaccine Sputnik V to Abkhazia.

=== January 2021 ===
In January 2021, five hundred doses of the two-dose Sputnik V COVID-19 vaccine have been delivered to a Russian military base in Abkhazia.

=== February 2021 ===
In early February, a deputy of the People's Assembly of Abkhazia announced, that Sputnik V is expected to arrive in Abkhazia in February or March 2021.

== Response ==
Abkhazia is a disputed territory in the South Caucasus, recognised by Russia and a few other countries as an independent state, but regarded by most international actors as part of Georgia, which considers the area—together with fellow breakaway entity South Ossetia—as Russian-occupied territory. Early in the pandemic, senior Georgian government officials called on the WHO and other international organisations to provide support to people living in the two breakaways. They said Georgia would not block movement to and from the regions. Unlike South Ossetia, Abkhazia cooperated to a degree with Georgia, allowing dozens of people to make use of medical services in the Tbilisi-controlled territory, and with international organisations, with the UN Development Programme providing much-needed basic medical supplies and sanitisers. Russia supplied some 500 COVID-19 test kits and sent soldiers to support disinfection of public places. A curfew was in place for nearly a month but was eased late in April 2020.

According to the International Crisis Group, the situation in Abkhazia presents several vulnerabilities. Abkhazia suffers from weak infrastructure and underequipped medical facilities, lacks medical professionals and has an ageing population, with nearly 20% of residents over 60 years of age. Nearly 80% of medical personnel are themselves at high risk, being in their 60s or older.
