= Nikolai Achba =

Abkhazian politician

Nikolai Vladimirovich Achba (Russian: Николай Владимирович Ачба) is a former Minister for Economy of Abkhazia. Achba was appointed on 15 October 2014 by newly elected President Raul Khajimba. On 8 April 2015, following the resignation of Prime Minister Beslan Butba, Achba was replaced by Adgur Ardzinba. Instead, Achba was appointed Deputy Chairman of the State Committee for State Property and Privatisation on 21 May.
