= 2025 Abkhazian presidential election =

- 15 February 2025 (first round); 1 March 2025 (second round)
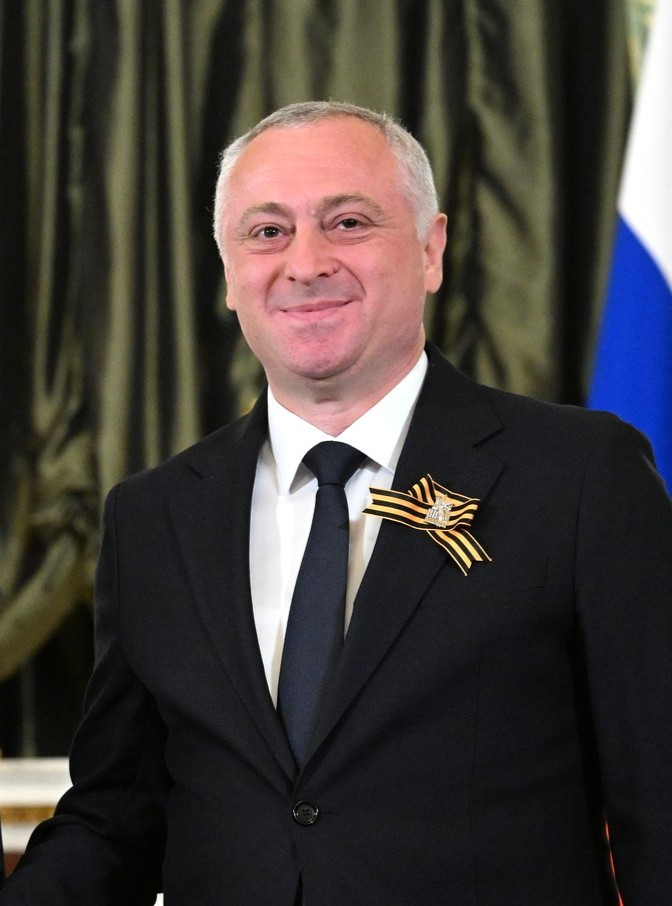

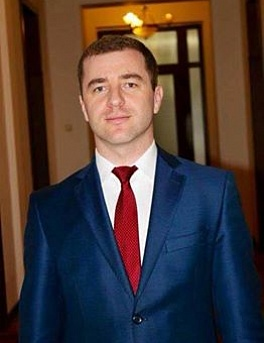
Candidate	Badra Gunba	Adgur Ardzinba
Party	Independent	APM
Popular vote	54,954	41,708
Percentage	55.66%	42.25%
President before election
Badra Gunba (acting)
Independent
Elected President
Badra Gunba
Independent

Presidential elections were held in the Republic of Abkhazia on 15 February 2025 following the 2024 Abkhazian protests. The protests resulted in the resignation of Aslan Bzhania as president of Abkhazia.

As no candidate received a majority of the vote in the first round, a second round was held on 1 March. Acting president Badra Gunba was elected, receiving 56% of the vote.

== Background ==
The election was called after president Aslan Bzhania resigned in November 2024 due to protests against an agreement allowing wealthy Russians to purchase property in Abkhazia. He was replaced on an acting basis by his vice president, Badra Gunba. On 28 November 2024, the People's Assembly of Abkhazia announced that new presidential elections would be held on 15 February 2025, with the winner to be inaugurated within the next 30 days of the results being declared. Assembly speaker Lasha Ashuba has estimated that the election would cost up to 25 million rubles ($227,300).

Researcher Olesya Vartanyan stated on 13 February that high-ranking Russians, notably Sergey Kiriyenko, are interfering with the election's conduct to help Badra Gunba, the candidate who is the most favorable to the Kremlin. Adgur Ardzinba was accused of being a "Turkish agent" which was compared to the 2004 Abkhazian presidential election, when Sergei Bagapsh was presented as pro-Georgian. The claim was rejected by the opposition.

== Electoral system ==
A candidate needs to win a majority of votes in the first round to avoid a runoff, which must be held within two weeks. In the second round, a "none of the above" option is included in the ballot. A candidate must receive more votes than both their opponent and the combined "none of the above" votes in order to win.

== Candidates ==
- Badra Gunba – acting president and former vice president. Gunba was endorsed by Aitaira, Amtsakhara, Apsadgyl, Kyarazaa, Our Home – Abkhazia, People's Front of Abkhazia and United Abkhazia.
- Adgur Ardzinba – leader of the Abkhaz People's Movement. He replaced MP Kan Kvarchia, who withdrew citing health issues following injuries sustained in the 2024 Parliament of Abkhazia shooting on 19 December. Arzinba was endorsed by Aamta, Aiaaira, Akzaara, Apsny, Aruaa, FNEA, Modern State and Our Capital.
- Oleg Bartsits – former head of the Abkhazian Trade Mission in Russia.
- Robert Arshba – former head of the Abkhazian Audit Chamber.
- Adgur Khurkhumal – president of the Black Sea Development Bank.

== Campaign ==
Following the first round, Ardzinba said that numerous unknown armed and uniformed people had surrounded the headquarters of the Central Election Commission of Abkhazia (CEC) in Sukhumi.

On 23 February, the CEC said that Gunba had violated electoral campaign laws by attending a meeting between Russian Health Minister Mikhail Murashko and the Abkhazian acting Health Minister Eduard Butba.

A televised debate was held between Gunba and Ardzinba on 27 February.

During the runoff on 1 March, masked attackers stormed a polling station and threatened election officials in northwestern Abkhazia. The Investigative Committee of Russia said it was investigating "attacks on Russian citizens" during the election.

== Results ==
Candidate	Running mate	Party	First round		Second round	
Candidate	Running mate	Party	Votes	%	Votes	%
Badra Gunba	Beslan Bigvava	Independent	45,817	47.76	54,954	55.66
Adgur Ardzinba	Alkhas Djindjal	Abkhaz People's Movement	36,476	38.03	41,708	42.25
Robert Arshba	Daut Agrba	Independent	7,434	7.75		
Oleg Bartsits	Adgur Kakoba	Independent	3,988	4.16		
Adgur Khurkhumal	Tengiz Kutelia	Independent	896	0.93		
Against all			1,313	1.37	2,065	2.09
Total			95,924	100.00	98,727	100.00
Valid votes			95,924	97.17	98,727	98.32
Invalid/blank votes			2,798	2.83	1,687	1.68
Total votes			98,722	100.00	100,414	100.00
Registered voters/turnout			143,960	68.58	143,651	69.90
Source: Central Election Commission

== Reactions ==
- Georgia: The Ministry of Foreign Affairs of Georgia denounced the "so-called presidential elections in Russian-occupied Abkhazia".
- European Union: A spokesperson for the European External Action Service said that the European Union does not recognize the constitutional and legal framework in which the "so-called presidential elections" took place.
- Russia: President Vladimir Putin congratuled Gunba on winning the election, saying the Abkhazian people had expressed their "free popular will".
- South Ossetia: President Alan Gagloev congratulated Gunba on his "convincing victory" in the election. Gagloev stated that South Ossetia and Abkhazia are "fraternal states united by common historical trials and values", and expressed hope for the development of allied relations between the two countries.
