= Freedom Square (Sukhumi) =

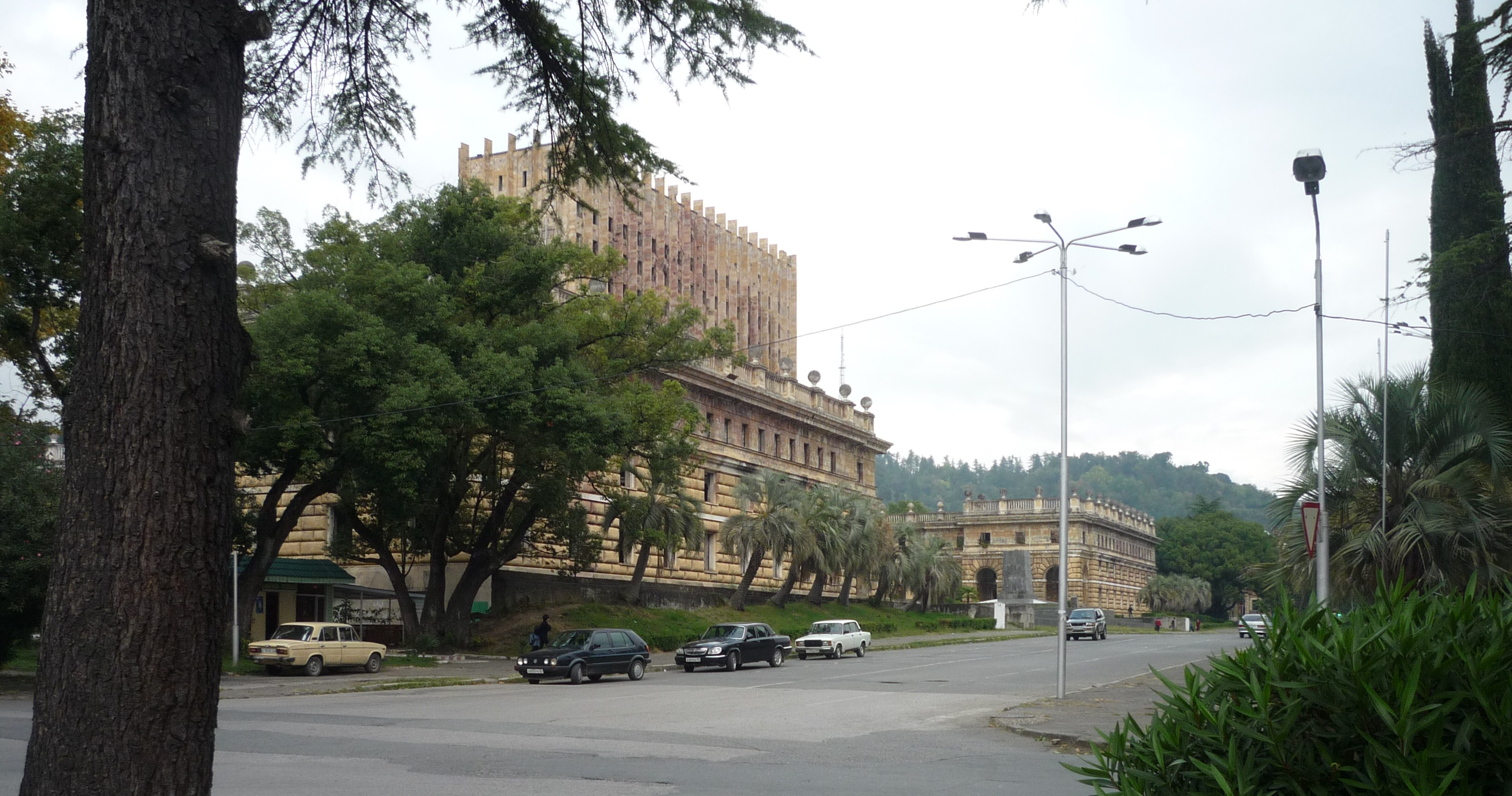

- Location within Abkhazia
- 43°00′12″N 41°01′09″E
- Location: Sukhumi, Abkhazia

History
- Built: 1920

Site notes
- Architect(s): Vladimir Shchuko and Vladimir Helfreich
- Governing body: City of Sukhumi

Freedom Square (Russian: Площадь Свободы) is the main square in Sukhumi, Abkhazia. It is used for public events. The parliament of Abkhazia is located on the square.

== History ==
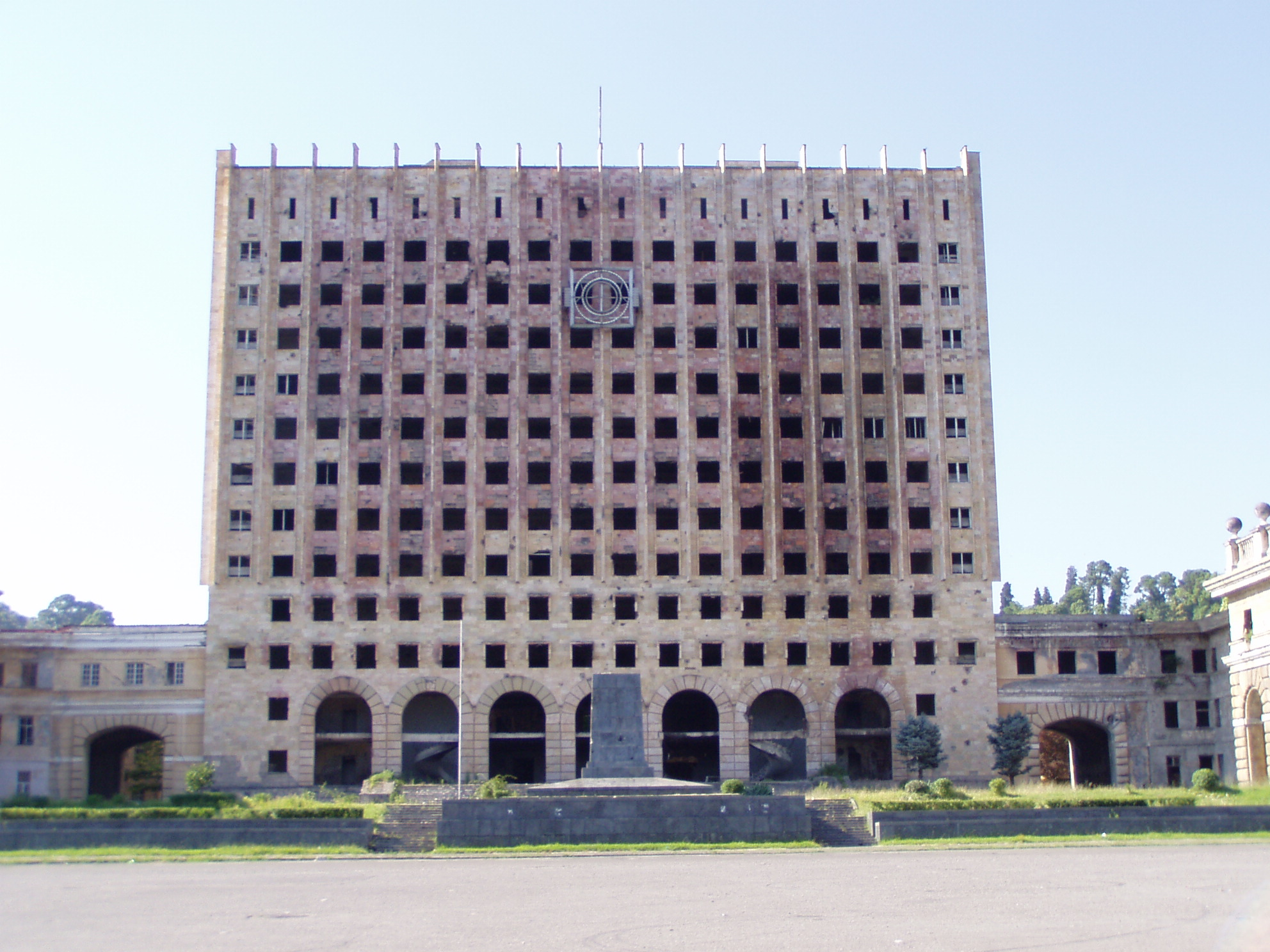
The former building of the Parliament of Abkhazia and the empty pedestal on Freedom Square, 2007.

In the 1920s, it was landscaped and was named Liberty Square. During the Soviet period, the area was named after Vladimir Lenin, and a monument to Lenin stood on the pedestal near the Government House. In 1985 a government building was built on the square which housed the Council of Ministers of Soviet Abkhazia. It was heavily damaged during the War in Abkhazia (1992–1993).

In September 2008, the mayor of Sukhumi, Alias Labakhua, stated that the issue of demolishing or reconstructing the building of the Cabinet of Ministers could be resolved in the near future. As of May 2018, this issue remains unresolved.

The following is a list of architectural monuments on the square:

- The ruined building of the Council of Ministers of Abkhazia
- Monument to Vladislav Ardzinba
