= 2020 Abkhazian presidential election =

- 22 March 2020
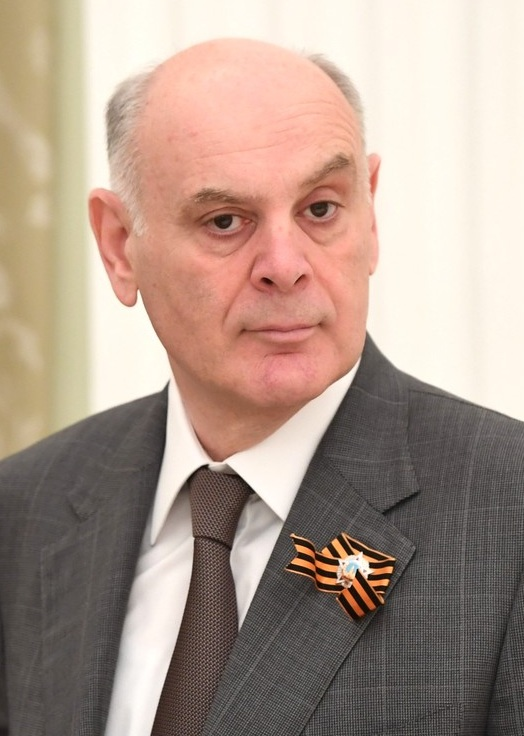

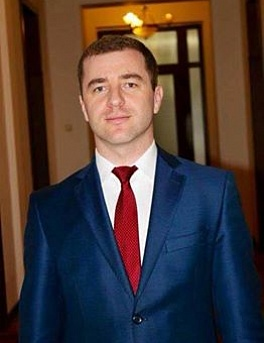
Candidate	Aslan Bzhania	Adgur Ardzinba
Party	Independent	FNUA
Running mate	Badra Gunba	Arda Ashub
Popular vote	53,741	33,686
Percentage	58.92%	36.93%
- Results by electoral district Bzhania: 45-50% 50-55% 55-60% 60-65% 65-70% Ardzinba: 45-50% 50-55%
President before election
Valeri Bganba (interim)
Independent
Elected President
Aslan Bzhania
Independent

Presidential elections were held in the Republic of Abkhazia on 22 March 2020 following the decision of the Supreme Court to annul the results of the 2019 election on 10 January, and the subsequent resignation of President Raul Khajimba due to protests against his presidency.

Aslan Bzhania was considered the frontrunner in the elections, and was elected with around 59% of the vote.

== Candidates ==
Presidential candidate	Career	Supporting parties	Vice presidential candidate
Adgur Ardzinba	Current Minister for Economy and Vice Prime Minister	Apsny, Aruaa, Forum for the National Unity of Abkhazia, People's Party of Abkhazia	Arda Ashub
Aslan Bzhania	Former Head of the State Security Service of Abkhazia	Amtsakhara, United Abkhazia	Badra Gunba
Leonid Dzapshba	Former Minister for Internal Affairs of Abkhazia	Akzaara	Viktor Khashba

== Results ==
Candidate	Running mate	Votes	%
Aslan Bzhania	Badra Gunba	53,741	58.92
Adgur Ardzinba	Arda Ashub	33,686	36.93
Leonid Dzapshba	Viktor Khashba	2,114	2.32
None of the above		1,666	1.83
Total		91,207	100.00
Valid votes		91,207	95.90
Invalid/blank votes		3,902	4.10
Total votes		95,109	100.00
Registered voters/turnout		132,916	71.56
Source: Abkhaz World

== Aftermath ==
After the elections results were announced, Bzhania gave a press conference. He announced planned constitutional reforms and that Alexander Ankvab would be the next prime minister.
