= 2021 Abkhazia unrest =

Event in Abkhazia

The 2021 Abkhazia unrest took place In December 2021. The unrest in Abkhazia was reportedly caused by factors including confiscation of opposition leader's private hydropower plant and the COVID-19 pandemic.

Violence and criminal damage occurred in the capital of Sukhumi. Electricity had to be supplied by the Russian Federation over the weekend.

The opposition called for President Aslan Bzhania to resign.

On 22 December, the President met with representatives from the opposition. On 23 December, state prosecutors launched a probe into the unrest.
