= Badra Gunba =

President of Abkhazia since 2025

- Бадра Гәынба
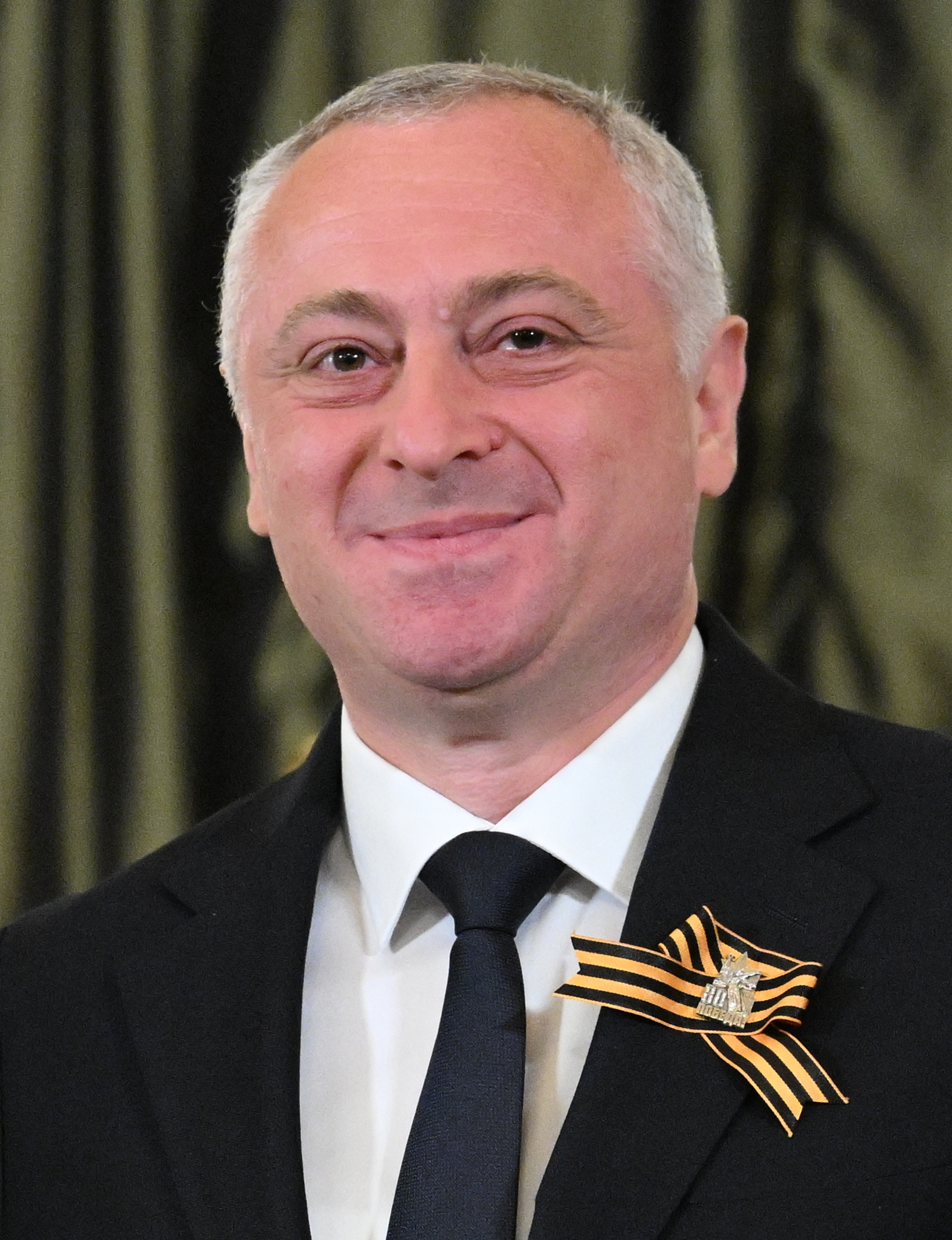
- Gunba in 2025

6th President of Abkhazia
- Incumbent
- Assumed office 2 April 2025; Acting: 19 November 2024 – 2 April 2025
- Prime Minister: Valeri Bganba (acting); Vladimir Delba
- Vice President: Beslan Bigvava
- Preceded by: Aslan Bzhania

7th Vice President of Abkhazia
- In office 23 March 2020 – 2 April 2025
- President: Aslan Bzhania; Himself (acting)
- Preceded by: Aslan Bartsits
- Succeeded by: Beslan Bigvava

Personal details
- Born: 14 August 1981 (age 45) Sukhumi, Abkhaz ASSR, Georgian SSR, Soviet Union
- Citizenship: Abkhazia, Russia
- Children: 2

Badra Zurabovich Gunba (Abkhaz: Бадра Зураб-иԥа Гәынба, romanized: Badra Zurab-ipha Gwynba; born 14 August 1981) is an Abkhazian politician who has been the sixth president of Abkhazia since 2025. He previously served as the seventh vice president under President Aslan Bzhania from 2020 to 2025.

Born in Sukhumi while it was part of the Abkhaz Autonomous Soviet Socialist Republic, Gunba was educated as an economist at the Saratov State Agrarian University. He became the Deputy Minister of Culture in 2009, and then Minister of Culture in 2011. In 2020, Bzhania selected Gunba to be his running mate for the 2020 presidential election where they both ran as Independents.

Bzhania eventually won the elections and he became president with Gunba becoming vice president on 23 March 2020. In November 2024, protests against Bzhania broke out and he resigned the presidency on 19 November and where Gunba became acting president. In 2025, Gunba ran for the presidential election held in March of that year where he won and was sworn in as president on 2 April.

== Early life and education ==
Badra Gunba was born in Sukhumi, Abkhaz Autonomous Soviet Socialist Republic, on 14 August 1981. He graduated from the Sokhumi State University in 1998, and became an economics teacher at the Abkhazian State University. In 2003, he graduated from Saratov State Agrarian University with a degree in accounting and auditing.

From December 2003 to August 2004, Gunba worked for the city government of Saratov as a specialist in its Department of Social Sphere and Apparatus Financing. He held different positions in the financial department of the city from March 2004 to February 2006. He received a PhD from Saratov State Agrarian University in 2007.

== Abkhazia ==
From January 2009 to October 2011, Gunba was the Deputy Minister of Culture and then as Minister of Culture from January 2011 to January 2014. He became Vice President of Abkhazia in 2020.

President Aslan Bzhania resigned in November 2024, after protestors seized control of government buildings. Gunba ascended to the presidency and defeated Adgur Ardzinba in the 2025 presidential election. Russia, which cut off electricity to Abkhazia after Bzhania's resignation, conducted election interference through Sergey Kiriyenko.

Gunba appointed Vladimir Delba as prime minister on 3 March 2025.

== Personal life ==
Gunba has two children with his wife.

== Works cited ==
=== News ===
- "Abkhazia's acting leader wins presidential election, state media say". Voice of America. 2 March 2025. Archived from the original on 16 June 2025.
- "Badra Gunba Wins De-Facto Abkhazian Presidential Elections". Caucasus Watch. 3 March 2025. Archived from the original on 16 June 2025.

=== Web ===
- "Аҧсны Аҳәынҭқарра Ахада". President of Abkhazia. Archived from the original on 16 June 2025.
- Vartanyan, Olesya (13 February 2025). "Moscow Has Run Out of Patience in Abkhazia". Carnegie Endowment for International Peace. Archived from the original on 16 June 2025.
