= Soviet nationalities policy =

Soviet nationalities policy was the varying policies implemented by the Soviet Union's government during its history as part of ruling over a multiethnic and multinational population, although East Slavs, particularly Russians, were dominant and favored for parts of the Soviet Union's history. Ultimately, the nationalities question was a major factor in the dissolution of the Soviet Union.

== See also ==
- Korenizatsiia – 1920s Soviet policy of promoting its indigenous ethnic groups
- Marxism and the National Question – Work by Stalin; theoretical basis of the policy
- National delimitation in the Soviet Union
- Population transfer in the Soviet Union
- Racism in the Soviet Union
- Russification
- Soviet of Nationalities – Upper house of the USSR legislature
- Soviet people – Citizens and nationals of the Soviet Union
