= Aslan Bzhania =

President of Abkhazia from 2020 to 2024

- Аслан Бжьаниа
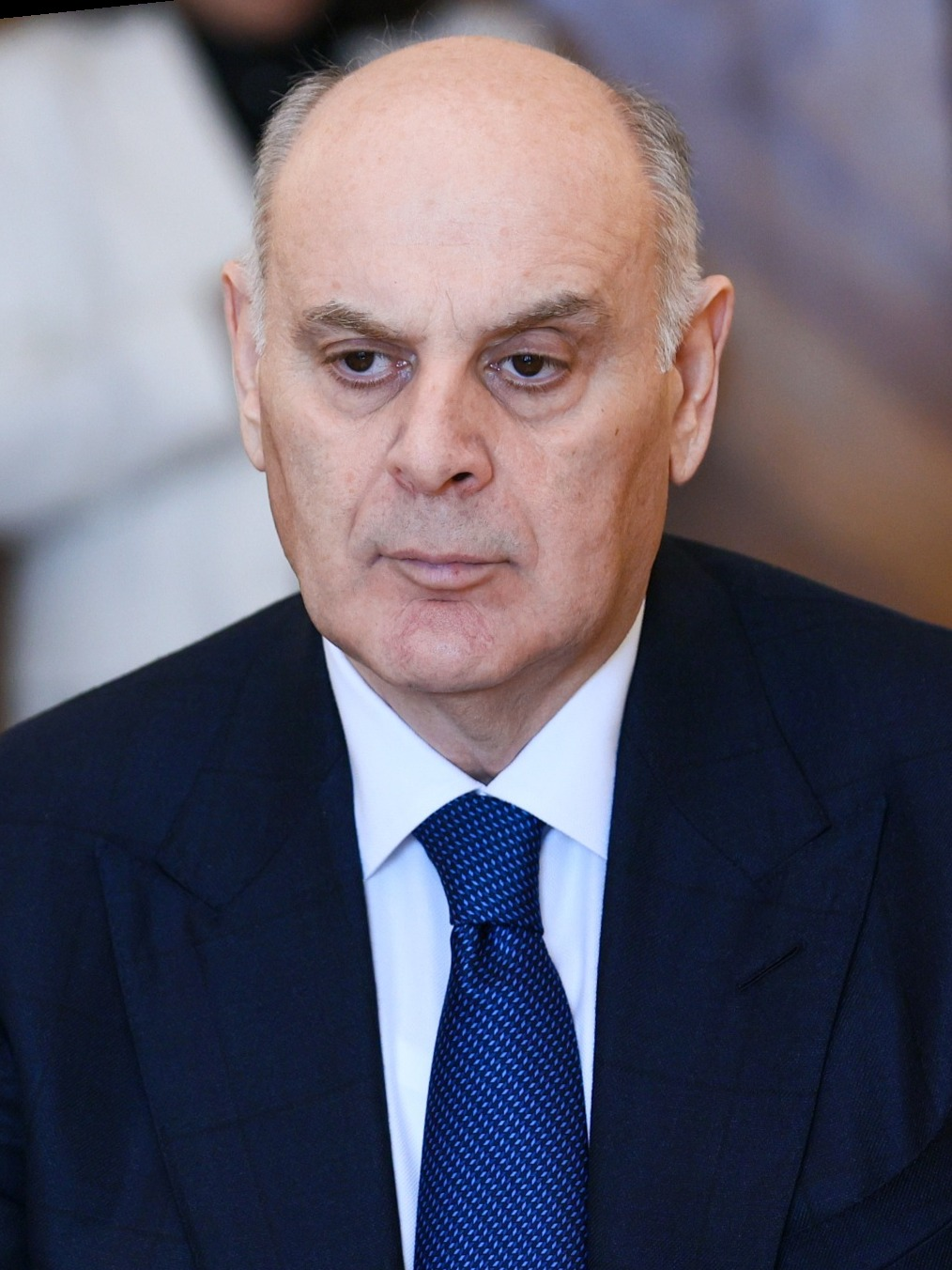
- Bzhania in 2022

5th President of Abkhazia
- In office 23 April 2020 – 19 November 2024
- Prime Minister: Alexander Ankvab
- Vice President: Badra Gunba
- Preceded by: Raul Khajimba; Valeri Bganba (acting)
- Succeeded by: Badra Gunba

Head of the State Security Service
- In office 23 February 2009 – 29 September 2014
- President: Sergei Bagapsh; Alexander Ankvab
- Preceded by: Iuri Ashuba
- Succeeded by: Zurab Margania

Personal details
- Born: 6 April 1963 (age 63) Tamishi, Abkhaz ASSR, Georgian SSR, Soviet Union
- Party: Independent
- Education: Moscow Automobile and Road Construction State Technical University; Academy of National Economy under the President of the Russian Federation

Aslan Georgievich Bzhania (Abkhaz: Аслан Гьаргь-иԥа Бжьаниа, romanized: Aslan Gyargy-ipha Bzhyania; Georgian: ასლან გიორგის-ძე ბჟანია, romanized: aslan giorgis-dze bzhania; Russian: Аслан Георгиевич Бжания; born 6 April 1963) is an Abkhaz politician who served as the fifth president of Abkhazia (Note: The political status of Abkhazia is disputed. Having unilaterally declared independence from Georgia in 1992, Abkhazia is formally recognised as an independent state by 4 UN member states (three other states previously recognised it but then withdrew their recognition), while the remainder of the international community recognizes it as de jure Georgian territory. Georgia continues to claim the area as its own territory, designating it as Russian-occupied territory.) from 23 April 2020 until his resignation on 19 November 2024. He was the Head of the State Security Service from 2010 to 2014, and one of the leaders of the opposition in Abkhazia from 2016. He ran in the 2019 presidential election, but was forced to withdraw due to poisoning. He won the subsequent 2020 presidential election.

== Early life ==
Bzhania was born on 6 April 1963 in the village of Tamishi, Ochamchira District. In 1985, he graduated from the Moscow Automobile and Road Construction University.

== Early career ==
Between 1991 and 1993, Bzhania worked for the State Security Service of Abkhazia. In 1994, he became a businessman in Moscow. In 1998, he graduated from the Academy of National Economy under the President of the Russian Federation. Between 1 January and 23 February 2009, Bzhania served as advisor to the Abkhazian Embassy in Moscow.

== State Security Service Head (2009–2014) ==
On 23 February 2009, following the re-election of Abkhazian President Sergei Bagapsh, he appointed Bzhania has head of the State Security Service, replacing Iuri Ashuba. Following Bagapsh's death in 2011, Bzhania was re-appointed by his successor Alexander Ankvab.

== 2014 revolution and presidential election ==
In 2014, after the May revolution against Ankvab, Bzhania became the candidate of the outgoing government in the subsequent Presidential election, running with Astan Agrba as vice presidential candidate. The pair was nominated by an initiative group on 2 July and received the support of the political party Amtsakhara, former Vice President Mikhail Logua and part of the campaign staff of nominee Beslan Eshba, who had been barred from running.

On 21 July, a group of citizens petitioned the Supreme Court to declare Bzhania's registration invalid, as it claimed he had not satisfied the five-year residency requirement, having lived in Moscow until February 2010. The case was dismissed because the statute of limitations had expired. Bzhania lost the election in the first round to opposition leader Raul Khajimba, coming in second place with 35.88% of the votes.

== Opposition leader ==
On 3 December 2016, Bzhania was detained by Russian border guards before crossing the border into Abkhazia. The event triggered protests by the Abkhazian opposition, who alleged Bzhania had been arrested on behest of the Abkhazian authorities. On 4 December, President Khajimba asked the Russian Ambassador in Abkhazia to facilitate Bzhania's release. In the evening, Bzhania was released and allowed to cross the border. In a press conference on 6 December, Bzhania stated that he had no direct evidence of involvement by the Abkhazian government, but claimed that while detained, he was approached by a man in civilian clothes who said he was instructed to inform him that he constituted a threat to both the Russian and the Abkhazian state. He also described how he had been subjected to multiple alcohol and drugs tests, and how his personal weapon, munition and license were subjected to close scrutiny.

=== Presidential elections ===
In 2019 Bzhania entered the 2019 Abkhazian presidential election and was considered a favorite candidate. However he was admitted to a hospital in Moscow in a severe condition in April 2019, with the presence of a large dose of mercury and aluminum in his blood, leading to allegations of poisoning on political grounds. He remained in the clinic through May, his respiratory system and speech impaired. As a result, he withdrew from the election on 15 July.

Raul Khajimba went on to win the election, but this prompted protests and in January 2020 the Abkhazian Supreme Court annulled the results. Khajimba resigned the presidency on 12 January, and new elections were called for 22 March. Bzhania entered these elections and won with 59% of the vote. His electoral platform included more dialogue with Georgia.

== Presidency ==
The 2021 Abkhazia unrest was against Bzhania.

=== Overthrow ===
In November 2024, large protests took place against the investment agreement between Abkhazia and Russia. On 15 November, protesters seized the building of the People's Assembly of Abkhazia and demanded Bzhania's resignation. Bzhania refused to resign. On 16 November, the Abkhazian opposition claimed that Bzhania had fled to an unknown location, while his press team announced that Bzhania was in his native village of Tamishi, and not at a Russian military base as previously rumoured.

On 19 November, after four days of protesters seizing government buildings and negotiations between the government and the opposition, President Aslan Bzhania and Prime Minister Alexander Ankvab resigned. Vice President Badra Gunba became acting president, while a snap election was held on 15 February 2025.

Political offices
| Preceded by Valeri Bganba; Acting | President of Abkhazia; 2020 | Succeeded by Incumbent |
