= Government of President Ankvab =

Government of Abkhazia

The Government of President Alexander Ankvab was the Government of the Republic of Abkhazia from 2011 until 2014.

== Composition ==
President	Alexander Ankvab; 26 September 2011 – 1 June 2014			Valeri Bganba; 1 June – 25 September 2014
Vice President	Mikhail Logua; 26 September 2011 – 25 December 2013			
Head of the Presidential Administration	Beslan Kubrava; 10 October 2011 – 3 June 2014			Astamur Tania; 9 June – 29 September 2014
Secretary of the Security Council	Stanislav Lakoba; 7 December 2011 – 28 October 2013		Nugzar Ashuba; 29 October 2013 – 3 June 2014	Avtandil Gartskia; 9 June – 28 October 2014
Head of the State Security Service	Aslan Bzhania; 26 September 2011 – 29 September 2014			
Cabinet leadership:
Prime Minister	Leonid Lakerbaia; 27 September 2011 – 2 June 2014			Vladimir Delba; 2 June – 29 September 2014
First Vice Premier	Indira Vardania; 10 October 2011 – 3 June 2014			
Vice Premiers	Vladimir Delba; 10 October 2011 – 15 October 2014			
Vice Premiers	Alexander Stranichkin; 10 October 2011 – 15 October 2014			
Vice Premiers		Beslan Eshba; 30 April 2013 – 3 June 2014		Beslan Butba; 13 June - 15 October 2014
Chief of the Cabinet Staff	Marina Ladaria; 20 October 2011 – 22 October 2014			
Ministers:
Defence	Mirab Kishmaria; 11 October 2011 – 15 October 2014			
Internal Affairs	Otar Khetsia; 20 October 2011 – 4 August 2014			Raul Lolua; 4 August – 15 October 2014
Foreign Affairs	Viacheslav Chirikba; 11 October 2011 – 17 October 2014			
Justice	Yekaterina Onishchenko; 31 October 2011 – 17 October 2014			
Finance	Vladimir Delba; 10 October 2011 – 17 October 2014			
Economy	David Iradyan; 27 October 2011 – 15 October 2014			
Taxes and Fees	Rauf Tsimtsba; 11 October 2011 – 15 October 2014			
Agriculture	Beslan Jopua; 18–15 October 2014			
Education	Daur Nachkebia; 20 October 2011 – 15 October 2014			
Culture	Badr Gunba; 13 October 2011 – 15 October 2014			
Health	Zurab Marshan; 28 October 2011 – 15 October 2014			
Labour and Social Security	Olga Koltukova; 20 October 2011 – 15 October 2014			
Emergency Situations				Lev Kvitsinia; 21 July – 17 October 2014
Chairmen of State Committees:
Customs	Said Tarkil; 14 October 2011 – 21 October 2014			
Property Management and Privatisation	Konstantin Katsia; 28 October 2011 – 23 October 2014			
Resorts and Tourism	Tengiz Lakerbaia; 14 October 2011 – 15 October 2014			
Youth Affairs and Sports	Shazina Avidzba; 28 October 2011 – 15 October 2014			
Repatriation	Zurab Adleiba; 14 October 2011 – 18 April 2013	Akhmad Marshan; 18 April – 14 June 2013	Khrips Jopua; 14 June 2013 – 21 October 2014	
Ecology and Nature	Roman Dbar; 14 October 2011 – 21 October 2014			

== Formation ==
President Alexander Ankvab and Vice President Mikhail Logua were elected on 26 August 2011 after the death of previous President Sergei Bagapsh, and sworn in on 26 September 2011. Ankvab had been Vice President under Bagapsh and became Acting President following his death. During the election, he competed with Prime Minister Sergei Shamba and opposition leader Raul Khajimba. Mikhail Logua was Head of the Gulripshi District Administration before his election.

On 27 September, Ankvab appointed as Prime Minister Leonid Lakerbaia, his long-time ally and First Vice-Premier under President Bagapsh. Ankvab tasked Lakerbaia with the formation of the cabinet, which took place over the course of October. In comparison to the Government of President Bagapsh, the number of Vice-Premiers was reduced by one, but otherwise Government structure remained unchanged.

Several government members were re-appointed to their previous positions: Alexander Stranichkin as Vice-Premier on 10 October, Mirab Kishmaria and Rauf Tsimtsba as Ministers for Defence and Taxes and Fees on 11 October, Said Tarkil, Zurab Adleiba, Tengiz Lakerbaia and Roman Dbar as Chairmen of the State Committees for Customs, for Repatriation, for Resorts and Tourism and for Ecology and Nature on 14 October, Olga Koltukova as Minister for Labour and Social Development on 20 October and on 28 October Zurab Marshan as Minister for Health and Konstantin Katsia as Chairman of the State Committee for State Property and Privatisation. Finally, Aslan Bzhania remained in place as head of the State Security Service.

Two people were appointed to a position they had previously held during President Bagapsh's first term in office: Secretary of the Security Council Otar Khetsia was appointed Interior Minister on 20 October, and on 7 December he was succeeded as Security Council Secretary by historian Stanislav Lakoba.

Besides the appointment of Leonid Lakerbaia as prime minister, there were three instances where Ministers of the Government of President Bagapsh were succeeded by their deputies: on 10 October, Vladimir Delba was appointed vice-premier and finance minister, on 13 October Badr Gunba was appointed Culture Minister and on 27 October, David Iradyan was appointed Minister for the Economy.

Two appointments had up until that point served in an unrelated government position: on 10 October, Leonid Lakerbaia was succeeded as First Vice-Premier by Education Minister Indira Vardania and Vice-Premier and Finance Minister Beslan Kubrava was made Head of the Presidential Staff.

The remaining positions were filled with people from outside the central government. On 11 October, diplomat and academic Viacheslav Chirikba was appointed Minister for Foreign Affairs. On 18 October, MP Beslan Jopua became Minister for Agriculture. On 20 October, Marina Ladaria was appointed Chief of the Cabinet Staff and the writer Daur Nachkebia Minister for Education. On 28 October, Shazina Avidzba was appointed Chairman of the State Committee for Youth and Sports, she had up until then held a similar position in the Sukhumi City administration. Finally, on 31 October, Sukhumi Municipal Court Judge Yekaterina Onishchenko was appointed Minister for Justice.

== Changes ==
- On 16 April 2013, Chairman of the State Committee for Repatriation Zurab Adlaiba handed in his resignation, which President Ankvab accepted on 18 April, temporarily appointing his Deputy Akhmad Marshan in his stead. On 14 June, Khrips Jopua was officially appointed as the new Chairman.
- On 30 April 2013, President Ankvab appointed Member of Parliament Beslan Eshba as Vice-Premier.
- On 28 October 2013, President Ankvab dismissed Stanislav Lakoba as Security Council Secretary, and the next day, he appointed former Parliament Speaker Nugzar Ashuba as his replacement.
- On 25 December 2013, Vice President Mikhail Logua announced his resignation for health reasons.
- On 1 June 2014, as a result of the 2014 Abkhazian political crisis, Alexander Ankvab resigned as President. He was succeeded in an acting fashion by People's Assembly Speaker Valeri Bganba. On 2 June, Leonid Lakerbaia resigned as prime minister and was temporarily succeeded by Vice Premier Vladimir Delba. On 3 June, Beslan Arshba resigned as Vice Premier. Bganba accepted his resignation and also dismissed Indira Vardania as First Vice Premier. On 4 June, Head of the Presidential Administration Beslan Kubrava and Security Council Secretary Nugzar Ashuba resigned, accusing the opposition of carrying out a witch hunt and imposing its decisions on the interim authorities. On 9 June, Bganba appointed Astamur Tania as acting Head of the Presidential Administration and Avtandil Gartskia as acting Security Council Secretary. On 13 June, Bganba appointed Beslan Butba as acting Vice Premier.
- On 21 July, Bganba transformed the Office for Emergency Situations into a full-fledged Ministry, and appointed its head Lev Kvitsinia as Acting Minister.
- On 4 August, Bganba dismissed Otar Khetsia as Minister of Internal Affairs and appointed First Deputy Minister Raul Lolua as Acting Minister. Lolua, previously Head of the State Security Service's Special Forces Centre, had been appointed First Deputy Minister on 9 June, following Ankvab's resignation, to carry out the duties of Khetsia, who was (put) on paid leave.
