= 2014 Abkhazian presidential election =

← 2011	24 August 2014	2019 →
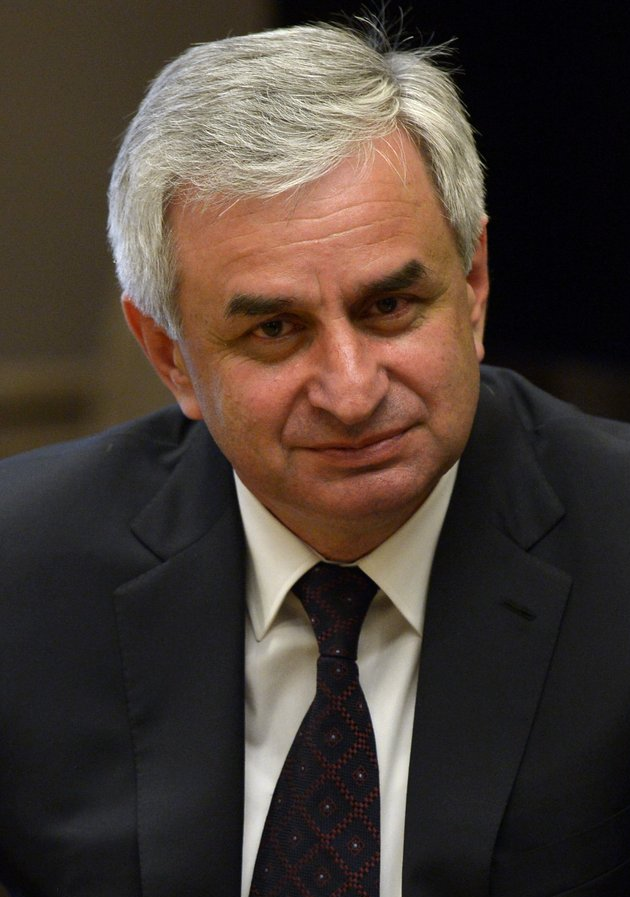

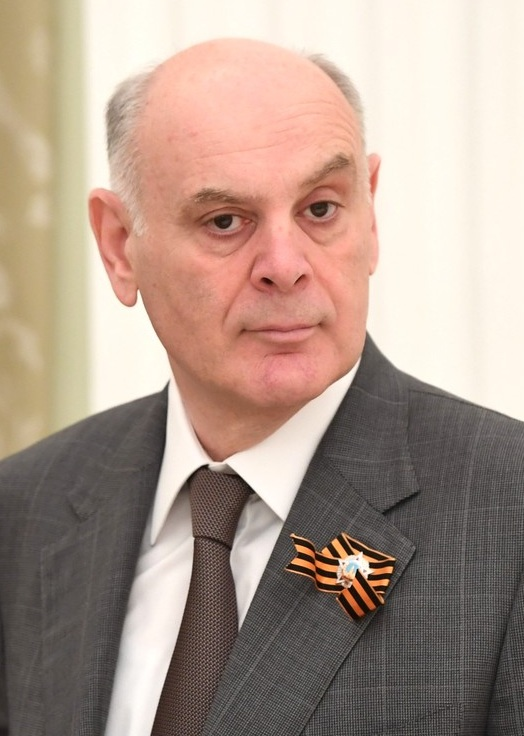
Candidate	Raul Khajimba	Aslan Bzhania
Party	FNUA	Independent
Running mate	Vitali Gabnia	Astan Agrba
Popular vote	50,494	35,860
Percentage	51.56%	36.56%
President before election
Valeri Bganba (acting)
Independent
Elected President
Raul Khajimba
FNUA

Presidential elections were held in the Republic of Abkhazia on 24 August 2014. The sixth such elections since the post of President of Abkhazia was created in 1994, they were held early due to the resignation of President Alexander Ankvab on 1 June 2014 following the 2014 Abkhazian political crisis. Four candidates contested the elections, which were won by Raul Khadjimba, who received just over 50% of the vote.

== Background ==
On 27 May, opposition protesters stormed the Presidential administration, prompting Ankvab to flee to Gudauta. The resulting crisis culminated in his resignation on 1 June. As Vice President Mikhail Logua had already resigned in December 2013 due to ill health, Speaker of the People's Assembly of Abkhazia Valeri Bganba has become acting president.

On 3 June 2014, chairman of the Central Election Committee Batal Tabagua announced that the committee had begun preparations for the Presidential election and that the date had been set for 24 August.

== Candidates ==
Candidates could be nominated between 25 June and 14 July. Parties registered less than five months before the election date were not eligible to nominate candidates. On 14 July, the Central Election Commission announced that all candidates except Beslan Eshba had passed the Abkhaz language fluency test. On 15 July, the Central Election Commission officially registered Khajimba, Kishmaria, Bazhania and Dzapshba as candidates. Of these, the first three received their registration certificates that same day, and Dzapshba on 16 July.

Presidential candidate	Career	Vice Presidential candidate	Career	Political support
Candidates participating in the election
Mirab Kishmaria	Minister of Defence (2007–present); Army General	Said Lolua		Nominated by an initiative group (25 June); Youth Forum (1 August)
Leonid Dzapshba	Chairman of the Civil Union For the Rule of Law, Stability and Democracy; Minister of Internal Affairs (2010–2011)	Boris Abitov		Nominated by an initiative group (27 June)
Raul Khajimba	Chairman of the Forum for the National Unity of Abkhazia; Member of Parliament (2012–present); Vice President (2005–2009); Prime Minister (2003–2004); Minister of Defence (2002–2003)	Vitali Gabnia	Chairman of Aruaa	Nominated by the Forum for the National Unity of Abkhazia (30 June); Coordinating Council of Political Parties and Public Organisations (18 June); Aruaa (19 June); Three out of four members of the executive committee of the Political Council of the Communist Party (24 July); Businessman Vitali Leiba (30 July); 20 (out of 35) Members of the People's Assembly of Abkhazia (15 August); 32 MPs from the first four convocations of the People's Assembly of Abkhazia (22 August); United Abkhazia
Aslan Bzhania	Chairman of the State Security Service of Abkhazia	Astan Agrba		Nominated by an initiative group (2 July); Amtsakhara (18 July); Former vice president Mikhail Logua (18 August); (Part of) Beslan Eshba's campaign staff (23 August)
Nominated candidates, but not registered
Beslan Eshba	Vice Premier (2013–2014); Member of Parliament (2012–2013); Businessman	Vakhtang Tsugba	Major General; Former Military Commissar	Nominated by an initiative group (26 June)

=== Mirab Kishmaria ===
Kishmaria's campaign manager was former MP Ilia Gamisonia.

Kishmaria campaigned on 23 July in the villages of Sanarda, Agubedia and Pervaya Bedia (Tkvarcheli District), on 24 July in Lykhny and Duripshi (Gudauta District), on 25 July in Gantiadi and Mekhadiri (Gagra District), on 29 July again in Lykhny, on 7 August among diaspora voters in Moscow, on 14 August with voters in Cherkessk, on 15 August in Primorskoe, Abgarkhuk and Achandara (Gudauta District), on 18 August in Sukhumi's New District and on 21 August in Tkvarcheli.

=== Leonid Dzapshba ===
Dzapshba's campaign manager was former chairman of the State Committee for Youth Affairs and Sports Rafael Ampar. His candidate for the post of prime minister was former Foreign Affairs Minister Maxim Gvinjia.

Dzapshba campaigned on 11 August in the villages of Babushara (Gulripshi District) and Kutoli and Jgyarda (Ochamchire District).

=== Raul Khajimba ===
Khajimba's campaign manager was MP Artur Mikvabia. His candidate for the post of prime minister was Beslan Butba, who had been appointed acting Vice Premier following President Ankvab's resignation.

Khajimba campaigned on 19 July in Ochamchire and Shaumyanovka (Gulripshi District), on 22 July in the villages of Alakhadzy, Kolkhida and Bzypta (Gagra District), on 23 July in Uarcha and Pshapi (Gulripshi District), on 30 July in Kutoli (Ochamchire District), on 11 August in Chlou and Tkhina (Ochamchire District), on 12 August in Salme, Mekhadyr and Bagrypsh (Gagra District), on 14 August in Myrkul (Ochamchire District), on 21 August in Achandara and Duripshi (Gudauta District) and Lower Eshera (Sukhumi District) and on 22 August in Lykhny (Gudauta District).

=== Aslan Bzhania ===
On 16 July and for the duration of the election, Bzhania's tasks as head of the State Security Service were transferred to First Deputy Head Zurab Margania.

Bzhania's campaign manager was Leonid Lakerbaia, who resigned as prime minister along with Alexander Ankvab, and his deputy campaign managers Mikhail Logua, vice president under Ankvab until December 2013, and Agriculture Minister Beslan Jopua. Bzhania's candidate for the post of prime minister was State Customs Committee Head Said Tarkil.

Bzhania campaigned on 20 July in Tkvarcheli and the villages of Bedia and Agubedia (Tkvarcheli District), on 21 July in Agudzera and Merkheuli (Gulripshi District), on 23 July in Sukhumi's New District, on 24 July in the villages of Gumista and Iastkhua (Sukhumi District), on 28 July again in Sukhumi, on 29 July again in Gulripshi District, on 1 August among diaspora voters in Moscow, on 7 August in Ochamchire, on 14 August in Sukhumi's Sinop District, on 16 August in Gagra, on 17 August with Russian-speaking voters, on 19 August in Pitsunda, on 20 August in Gudauta, and on 21 August in Sukhumi's Kinoprokat District.

== Campaign ==
On 24 July, a prayer service was held in Sukhumi Cathedral in which all four candidates participated. On 25 July all four candidates signed an election covenant promising to conduct fair election campaigns.

=== Participation of Georgian voters ===
One of the key complaints of the opposition during the 2014 Abkhazian political crisis was that thousands of Georgian residents of the Gali, Tkvarcheli and Ochamchira Districts had received Abkhazian passports in violation of citizenship law. Accordingly, on 1 July, 22787 Georgians were stricken from the voters list.

=== Re-opening of railway-connection with Armenia through Georgia ===
On 7 July, four Armenian former and current members of the People's Assembly launched an appeal that Abkhazia should actively push for the restoration of the Russian-Armenian railway link through Abkhazia, as it would strengthen both Abkhazia's economy and sovereignty. The proposal received sharp criticism in Parliament, in part due to the use in the appeal of the phrase 'the Abkhazian-Georgian section of the railway'. On 16 July, Aslan Bzhania expressed his support for the proposal.

== Incidents ==
Around 4:05 in the morning of 20 August, a grenade was thrown into courtyard of CEC head Batal Tabagua. No one was injured, Tabagua's and neighbouring houses were damaged.

On 22 August, at about 18:00, the parked car of Nuzhnaya journalist Isida Chania was shot at from a white Lexus SUV. At the crime scene, 29 empty cartridges and 2 bullets were found.

== Conduct ==
As in previous elections, there will be polling stations outside Abkhazia, in Moscow and Cherkessk. For the first time, there will also be a polling station in Istanbul. All three polling stations are assigned to District no. 5 in Sukhumi, where the Ministry for Foreign Affairs is located.

== Opinion polls ==
Date	Source	Khajimba	Bzhania	Kishmaria	Dzapshba
End July–start August 2014	ISM	42%	33%	19%	6%
4–10 August 2014	ISM	40%	36%	15%	9%
22–23 August 2014 (Sokhumi)	Medium-Orinet	45%	33%	14%	8%

== Results ==
According to the official results released by the Central Election Commission on 26 August, Raul Khajimba was elected in the first round.

Candidate	Party	Votes	%
Raul Khajimba	Forum for the National Unity of Abkhazia	50,586	51.56
Aslan Bzhania	Independent	35,869	36.56
Mirab Kishmaria	Independent	6,390	6.51
Leonid Dzapshba	Independent	3,397	3.46
Against all		1,870	1.91
Total		98,112	100.00
Valid votes		98,112	98.15
Invalid/blank votes		1,854	1.85
Total votes		99,966	100.00
Registered voters/turnout		132,861	75.24
Source: Apsnypress
