= Government of President Bagapsh =

Government of Abkhazia

The Government of President Sergei Bagapsh was the Government of the Republic of Abkhazia from 2005 until 2011.

== Composition ==
| President | Sergei Bagapsh; 12 February 2005 – 29 May 2011 | | | Alexander Ankvab; 29 May – 26 September 2011 |
| Vice-President | Raul Khajimba; 12 February 2005 – 28 May 2009 | | Alexander Ankvab; 12 February 2010 – 29 May 2011 | |
| Head of the Presidential Administration | Valery Arshba; 15 February 2005 – 1 March 2010 | | Grigori Enik; 2 March 2010 – 10 October 2011 | |
| Secretary of the Security Council | Stanislav Lakoba; 17 February 2005 – 25 August 2009 | Aleksandr Voinskiy; 17 September 2009 – 18 August 2010 | Otar Khetsia; 18 August 2010 – 7 December 2011 | |
| Head of the State Security Service | Iuri Ashuba; 28 February 2005 – 23 February 2010 | | Aslan Bzhania; 23 February 2010 – 26 September 2011 | |
Cabinet:
| Prime Minister | Alexander Ankvab; 14 February 2005 – 13 February 2010 | | Sergei Shamba; 13 February 2010 – 27 September 2011 | |
| First Vice Premier | | Leonid Lakerbaia; 19 January 2009 – 10 October 2011 | | |
| Vice Premiers | Leonid Lakerbaia; 24 February 2005 – 19 January 2009 | | Daur Tarba; 24 February 2010 – 4 March 2011 | Vakhtang Pipia; 30 March – 10 October 2011 |
| Vice Premiers | Beslan Kubrava; 24 February 2005 – 10 October 2011 | | | |
| Vice Premiers | Sultan Sosnaliyev; 25 February 2005 – 8 May 2007 | | | |
| Vice Premiers | | Alexander Stranichkin; 10 March 2006 – 10 October 2011 | | |
| Chief of the Cabinet Staff | Zurab Adleiba; 9 September 2005 – 9 September 2010 | | | Daur Kove; 9 September 2010 – 20 October 2011 |
Cabinet Ministers:
| Defence | Sultan Sosnaliyev; 25 February 2005 – 8 May 2007 | Mirab Kishmaria; 10 May 2007 – 11 October 2011 | | |
| Internal Affairs | Otar Khetsia; 25 February 2005 – 12 August 2010 | | Ramin Gablaia; 12 August – 22 September 2010 | Leonid Dzapshba; 22 September 2010 – 20 October 2011 |
| Foreign Affairs | Sergei Shamba; 21 March 2005 – 26 February 2010 | | Maxim Gvinjia; 26 February 2010 – 11 October 2011 | |
| Justice | Liudmila Khojashvili; 7 April 2005 – 31 October 2011 | | | |
| Finance | Beslan Kubrava; 24 February 2005 – 10 October 2011 | | | |
| Economy | Kristina Ozgan; 25 February 2005 – 27 October 2011 | | | |
| Taxes and Fees | Vakhtang Pipia; 25 February 2005 – 30 March 2011 | | | Rauf Tsimtsba; 4 April – 11 October 2011 |
| Agriculture | Vitali Smyr; 25 February 2005 – 2007 | Yuri Aqaba; 6 August 2007 – 18 October 2011 | | |
| Education | Indira Vardania; 10 March 2005 – 20 October 2011 | | | |
| Culture | Nugzar Logua; 10 March 2005 – 13 October 2011 | | | |
| Health | Zurab Marshan; 25 February 2005 – 28 October 2011 | | | |
| Labour and Social Security | Olga Koltukova; 2 March 2005 – 20 October 2011 | | | |
Chairmen of State Committees:
| Customs | Grigori Enik; 24 February 2005 – 2 March 2010 | | Said Tarkil; 2 March 2010 – 14 October 2011 | |
| Property Management and Privatisation | Daur Tarba; 24 February 2005 – 3 April 2007 | Konstantin Katsia; 3 April 2007 – 28 October 2011 | | |
| Forestry | Adolf Shamba; 24 February 2005 – | | | |
| Resorts and Tourism | Tengiz Lakerbaia; 24 February 2005 – 14 October 2011 | | | |
| Standards, Metrology and Certification | Nerses Nersesyan; 24 February 2005 – | | | |
| Youth Affairs and Sports | Rafael Ampar; 24 March 2005 – 28 October 2011 | | | |
| Repatriation | Anzor Mukba; 24 February 2005 – 9 September 2010 | | | Zurab Adleiba; 9 September 2010 – 14 October 2011 |
| Ecology and Nature | | | Roman Dbar; 7 April 2010 – 14 October 2011 | |

== Changes ==
Most of the cabinet members were first appointed after President Bagapsh came to power in 2005. Foreign Minister Sergei Shamba was one of the few Ministers to be re-appointed. Since then, the cabinet has undergone few changes.

- On 10 March 2006, Vice-Speaker of the People's Assembly of Abkhazia Alexander Stranichkin was appointed as vice-premier.
- On 3 April 2007, chairman of the State Committee for Management of State Property and Privatization Daur Tarba transferred to become head of the Ochamchira District. He was replaced by Konstantin Katsia.
- On 8 May 2007, Minister of Defence and Vice Premier Sultan Sosnaliyev resigned. He was succeeded as defence minister (but not as vice premier) by First Deputy Defence Minister Mirab Kishmaria, in an acting fashion from 10 May and permanently from 26 July onwards.
- On 6 August 2007, Yuri Aqaba was appointed Minister of Agriculture after his predecessor Vitaly Smyr had been elected to parliament in the March 2007 election.
- On 19 January 2009, Vice-Premier Leonid Lakerbaia was promoted to the position of First Vice-Premier.
- On 26 January 2009, Deputy Minister for the Interior Zakan Jugelia was murdered in Sukhumi.
- On 18 August Security Council Secretary Stanislav Lakoba handed his resignation over the Abkhazian citizenship crisis, his resignation was ratified on 25 August by President Bagapsh. On 17 September Lakoba's deputy in the Security Council Aleksandr Voinskiy was appointed to temporarily succeed him.
- After the December 2009 re-election of President Bagapsh, he replaced State Security Service Head Iuri Ashuba with Aslan Bzhania on 23 February 2010. On 1 March, he released Valery Arshba as head of the Presidential Administration, and on the next day appointed State Customs Committee Head Grigori Enik as his replacement, who in turn was succeeded by his Deputy Said Tarkil. On 12 March President Bagapsh approved the revised Cabinet structure. The State Environmental Service was transformed into the State Committee for Ecology, and on 7 April its chairman Roman Dbar was correspondingly re-appointed. The team of Ministers was changed in three respects. Prime Minister Alexander Ankvab had been elected vice president together with Bagapsh, and one day after they were sworn in on 12 February 2010 he was succeeded by Foreign Minister Sergei Shamba, who was succeeded by his deputy Maxim Gvinjia on 26 February. Furthermore, Daur Tarba was re-appointed to the cabinet as vice premier on 24 February.
- On 14 April 2010, five Deputy Ministers of Defence were retired, including Chief of the Armed Forces Anatoli Zaitsev. Aslan Ankvab was appointed acting First Deputy Minister of Defence and Chief of Staff. On 21 May 2010, Beslan Tsvishba was also appointed First Deputy Minister of Defence. On 29 March 2011, Vladimir Vasilchenko succeeded Aslan Ankvab to become the new, permanent, Chief of Staff and First Deputy Minister of Defence.
- Otar Khetsia was dismissed as minister of the interior on 12 August 2010 and appointed secretary of the State Security Council on 18 August. He was temporarily succeeded by his first deputy minister Ramin Gablaia until First Deputy Minister of Taxes and Fees Leonid Dzapshba was appointed the new minister of the interior on 22 September.
- On 9 September 2010, President Bagapsh dismissed Anzor Mukba as chairman of the State Repatriation Committee and replaced him by Chief of the Cabinet Staff Zurab Adleiba, who was in turn replaced by Deputy Minister for Foreign Affairs Daur Kove.
- On 25 February 2011, Daur Tarba announced that he was resigning as vice-premier, without specifying his reasons. His resignation was approved by President Bagapsh on 4 March. Tarba was succeeded by Minister for Taxes and Fees Vakhtang Pipia on 30 March. Pipia in turn was succeeded on 4 April by Rauf Tsimtsba, who had previously headed the Department for the Taxation of Legal Entities within the ministry.
- On 29 May 2011, President Bagapsh died from the complication of surgery in Moscow. Following the constitution, he was replaced temporarily by Vice President Alexander Ankvab, until elections to be held within three months could determine his successor.
- On 20 September 2011, acting president Ankvab dismissed deputy head of the presidential administration Alexander Adleiba.
