= 2019 Abkhazian presidential election =

← 2014	25 August 2019 (first round); 8 September 2019 (second round)	2020 →
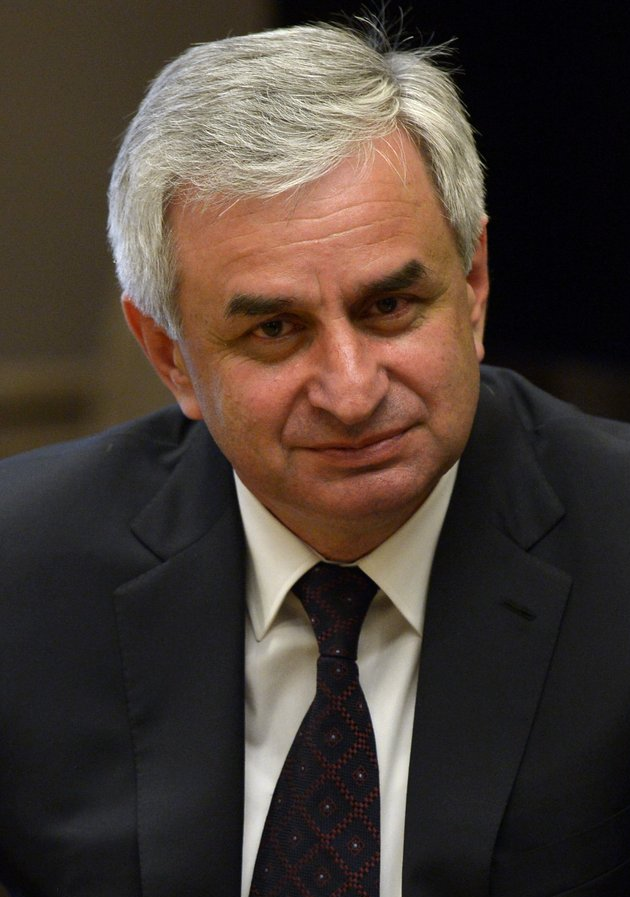

Candidate	Raul Khajimba	Alkhas Kvitsinia
Party	FNUA	Amtsakhara
Running mate	Aslan Bartsits	Dmitri Dbar
Popular vote	39,741	38,742
Percentage	48.68%	47.46%
President before election
Raul Khajimba
FNUA
Elected President
Election results annulled
Valeri Bganba becomes interim president

Presidential elections were held in the partially recognized Republic of Abkhazia in 2019. As no candidate gathered more than 50% of the votes in the first round 25 August, a second was held on 8 September between the top two candidates, incumbent President Raul Khajimba of the Forum for the National Unity of Abkhazia and Alkhas Kvitsinia of Amtsakhara. Khajimba was subsequently re-elected with a margin of less than 2% in the second round. On September 20, the Supreme Court in Abkhazia declared the decision of the Central Election Commission to recognize incumbent Raul Khajimba's victory in the second round of the presidential election as legal.

In January 2020 the Abkhazian Supreme Court annulled the results, following protests against Khajimba. Khajimba resigned the presidency on 12 January, and new elections were called for 22 March.

== Background ==
The People's Assembly had originally set a date for 21 July. In May 2019, the opposition demanded rescheduling the elections after the main opposition candidate Aslan Bzhania appeared to have been poisoned in Russia. The elections were subsequently postponed to 25 August 2019 under pressure from supporters of the Bzhania.

== Candidates ==
Registration for candidates officially opened on 26 June 2019. Ten candidate initially registered; but it was later determined that one candidate, Astamur Otirba, had not presented a vice-president in time.

Presidential candidate	Career	Party	Vice Presidential candidate
Shamil Adzinba	Deputy Prime Minister, 2014–2016		Rafael Ampar
Artur Ankvab	Historian, Lecturer at Abkhazian State University		Soslan Salakaya
Oleg Arshba	Former Deputy Foreign Minister		Oleg Bartsyts
Leonid Dzapshba	Leader of Akzaara, Minister of Internal Affairs, 2010–2016	Akzaara	Vianor Ashba
Almas Japua	Member of Parliament	Independent	Vadim Smyr
Astamur Kakalia	Businessman, diplomat		Astamur Ayba
Raul Khajimba	Incumbent President of Abkhazia	FNUA	Aslan Bartsits
Alkhas Kvitsinia	Chairman of Amtsakhara	Amtsakhara	Dmitri Dbar
Astamur Tarba	Former head of the State Security Service of Abkhazia		Tamazi Ketsba

== Bzhaniya’s withdrawal from the election ==
Opposition leader Aslan Bzhania withdrew from the election on 15 July due to an apparent poisoning.

== Results ==
Candidate	Running mate	First round		Second round	
Candidate	Running mate	Votes	%	Votes	%
Raul Khajimba	Aslan Bartsits	20,544	26.33	39,741	48.68
Alkhas Kvitsinia	Dmitri Dbar	18,929	24.26	38,742	47.46
Oleg Arshba	Oleg Bartsyts	18,665	23.92		
Astamur Tarba	Tamazi Ketsba	5,695	7.30		
Leonid Dzapshba	Vianor Ashba	4,935	6.33		
Shamil Adzinba	Rafael Ampar	3,579	4.59		
Almas Japua	Vadim Smyr	1,753	2.25		
Artur Ankvab	Soslan Salakaya	1,403	1.80		
Astamur Kakalia	Astamur Ayba	841	1.08		
None of the above		1,677	2.15	3,154	3.86
Total		78,021	100.00	81,637	100.00
Valid votes		78,021	94.24	81,637	97.32
Invalid/blank votes		4,770	5.76	2,246	2.68
Total votes		82,791	100.00	83,883	100.00
Registered voters/turnout		129,421	63.97	127,136	65.98
Source: Apsnypress, Apsnypress

== Aftermath ==
Following the second round, Alkhas Kvitsinia contested the results in court. After the elections, Khajimba re-appointed Valery Bganba as Prime Minister.

Protests against Khajimba began on 9 January 2020, and on 10 January the Abkhazian Supreme Court annulled the results of the election.

== See also ==
- List of annulled elections
