= Abkhazian passport =

Passport issued to citizens of Abkhazia

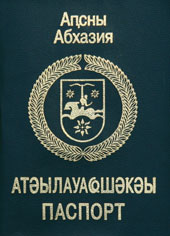
- The front cover of a contemporary Abkhazian passport
- Type: Passport
- Issued by: Abkhazia
- Purpose: Identification
- Eligibility: Abkhazian citizenship

The Abkhazian passport (Abkhaz: Аҧсны атәылауаҩшәҟәы, romanized: Apsny ata̋ylauaòša̋k̄a̋y; Russian: Абха́зский па́спорт, romanized: Abkhazskiy pasport) is issued to citizens of the Republic of Abkhazia for the purpose of international travel and for the purpose of legal identification within Abkhazia. As Abkhazia is recognised only by Russia, Venezuela, Syria, and Nicaragua, for all other destinations Abkhazian citizens must use another passport (most of them use Russian passports) for international travel.

== Background ==
Before the introduction of Abkhazian passports, Abkhazia still used Soviet passports. These arrived in 1991 in Adjara, where they were not needed since Adjara and the rest of Georgia were introducing separate Georgian passports. They were then given by Adjar leader Aslan Abashidze to the Abkhazian authorities, although it is not known how or when. People who could not obtain a Soviet passport, for example because they had not yet turned 16 when the Soviet Union disbanded or many of the inhabitants of the Gali District received a 'form no. 9', meant to certify a loss of passport.

The (internal) Soviet passports were set to expire in 2004, and so a new passport was needed. The issue of introducing an Abkhazian passport was first discussed towards the end of the nineties. In May 2000, Justice Minister Batal Tabagua announced that an order for empty passport forms placed with the Perm Goznak Manufacture had been cancelled by Russia's Ministry for Foreign Affairs. In 2003 finally passports were ordered from a private Turkish printing company, but the first shipment of 25,000 passports was intercepted and confiscated by Georgian authorities. The passports had been meant to be distributed before the 2004 Presidential election, but when the second batch arrived it became clear that the passports contained errors and so President Vladislav Ardzinba decided not to have them issued. After Sergei Bagapsh was elected to the presidency he decided not to waste the invested money and to introduce the passports in January 2006 despite the errors. The quality of these passports was very poor. From 2016 a new version is in circulation.

Abkhazia has issued (foreign) passports for international travel (blue cover) since 2010.

== Adoption ==
The first passport was issued in January 2006 to former President Ardzinba, and the second passport posthumously to activist and academic Tamara Shakryl, who had been the only victim during the 2004 post-election crisis. President Bagapsh himself was the first person to regularly apply for an Abkhazian passport.

By February 2007, Abkhazian passports had been issued to 33,000 people. This number subsequently rose to 45,000 in April, 53,000 in May, 63,000 in August, 110,000 in July 2008, 141,245 on 12 October 2009, 142,625 on 1 November. and 146,121 on 7 December.

On 7 December 2009, the ethnic break-down of passport holders was as follows:

Nationality	Passport holders	Percentage
Abkhaz	73,622	50.4
Armenians	32,363	22.1
Russians	17,795	12.2
Georgians	12,156	8.3
Ukrainians	2,430	2.1
Abazins	2,138	1.7
Greeks	1,500	1.0
Other	4,117	2.8
Total	146,121	100.0

Also, of the total number of passport holders, 9910 were under the age of 18, and 5759 lived outside Abkhazia.

The Abkhazian government said in 2007 that once the distribution of passports was completed, it would be the only legal form of identification within Abkhazia. It was announced that from the beginning of 2008, citizens could no longer receive a Russian pension without an Abkhazian passport. Abkhazian passports became the only possible form of legitimation for voters starting with the December 2009 presidential election.

On 20 October 2009 it was announced that a new passport would be introduced with additional security features, so as to satisfy all international criteria. The new passports were to be printed by the Russian state enterprise Goznak. The original passports were insufficiently secure for cross-border travel with Russia. Abkhazia said it would start issuing passports to its citizens by the end of June 2010.

== Gali controversy and 2014 revolution ==
The issuing of passports in the Gali District was a priority for the government in order to better integrate its inhabitants into the rest of Abkhazia, but was controversial for various reasons. It was criticised by the Abkhazian opposition on the grounds that the large majority of inhabitants of the Gali District are Georgians who possess Georgian citizenship. The Abkhazian government responded to this by pointing out that Abkhazian citizenship law does not allow for dual citizenship (except for dual Abkhazian-Russian citizenship) and that therefore, Georgian citizens first had to renounce their Georgian citizenship before obtaining Abkhazian passports. Georgia in turn has accused Abkhazia of forcing its citizens in the Gali District to renounce their citizenship and take up Abkhazian passports, but this was denied by the Abkhazian government.

According to the Abkhazian government, as of 12 October 2009, 3522 residents of the Gali District had acquired an Abkhazian passport. In April 2013, Head of the Interior Ministry's Passport and Visa Service Beslan Bigvava declared that 16,096 Georgians had received an Abkhazian passport in Gali District, 6217 in Ochamchira District and 2453 in Tkvarcheli District.

The issuing of Abkhazian passports to Georgian residents became a key complaint of the opposition against the Government of President Ankvab, as it alleged that most recipients were not legally Abkhazian citizens, and one of the factors leading to the May 2014 revolution against Ankvab.

== New version (since 2016) ==
On 18 May 2016, the first four copies of the new passport, produced by Goznak, were issued to war hero Garrik Adzinba, Deputy Head of the Cabinet of Ministers Zurab Marshan, Aslan Kapba and Alisa Inapshba. Systematically, all old passports (2006 version) were replaced by this new version.

== Design ==
The cover of the Abkhazian passport is dark green, it displays the coat of arms of Abkhazia with above it the short name of the country (Abkhazia) and below the word 'passport', both in Abkhaz and in Russian.

== See also ==
- International recognition of Abkhazia
- Foreign relations of Abkhazia
