= Nugzar =

Nugzar (Georgian: ნუგზარ) is a Georgian masculine given name. Notable people with the given name include:

- Nugzar Asatiani (1937–1992), Soviet fencer
- Nugzar Ashuba (born 1952), politician from Abkhazia
- Nugzar Bagration-Gruzinsky (born 1950), Georgian nobleman
- Nugzar Kvirtia (born 1984), Georgian football player
- Nugzar Lobzhanidze (born 1971), Georgian football player
- Nugzar Logua, painter, poet and politician from Abkhazia
- Nugzar Tatalashvili (born 1990), Georgian judoka
