= Apsadgyl =

Apsadgyl Аԥсадгьыл
- Leader: Nugzar Logua
- Founded: 19 January 2012

Apsadgyl (Abkhaz: Аԥсадгьыл) is a socio-political organisation in Abkhazia and a faction in the People's Assembly.

== Foundation ==
Apsadgyl held its founding congress as a public union on 19 January 2012, led by lawyer Tamaz Ketsba.

On 30 July 2015, Apsadgyl was registered as a socio-political organisation. on 7 August, members of the People's Assembly Georgi Agrba, Fazlibei Avidzba, Guram Barganjia, Anzor Kokoskeria and Akhra Pachulia had established the faction Apsadgyl, led by Agrba. On 16 August 2015, Apsadgyl held a meeting in which it presented itself and elected former Presidential nominee and Vice Premier Beslan Eshba as its Chairman.

On 18 March 2016, Apsadgyl declared with respect to the upcoming referendum to hold an early presidential election that, while it was not one of the initiators, it acknowledged the constitutional right to organise such a referendum and called upon both proponents and opponents to adhere to the law and behave respectfully.

On 6 October, due to the appointment of Beslan Eshba as Vice Premier, Apsadgyl's executive committee elected former Culture Minister Nugzar Logua as its new Chairman.
