= Beslan Bigvava =

Vice President of Abkhazia since 2025

- Беслан Бигвава

8th Vice President of Abkhazia
- Incumbent
- Assumed office 2 April 2025
- President: Badra Gunba
- Prime Minister: Vladimir Delba
- Preceded by: Badra Gunba

Beslan Vladimirovich Bigvava (Russian: Беслан Владимирович Бигвава) is an Abkhazian politician who has been the eighth Vice President of Abkhazia since 2025.
