= Aruaa =

Aruaa Аруаа
- Leader: Ilia Gunia
- Founded: 10 May 2007
- Ideology: Nationalism
- Colours: red, white

Aruaa (Abkhaz: Аруаа; lit. 'Defenders') is a political and social organisation in Abkhazia uniting veterans of the 1992–1993 war with Georgia. It was founded on 10 May 2007. 534 people were present at its founding congress. The first Minister of Defence of Abkhazia Vladimir Arshba was unanimously elected Chairman of the organisation, and Vadim Smyr and Mukhamed Kilba were elected Vice Chairmen. Apart from Arshba, Smyr and Kilba, ten more people were elected into the Supreme Council: Sergei Matosian, Eduard Bulia, Slavik Kuchuberia, Adler Mikvabia, Vitaly Gabnia, Gennady Margani, Kachubei Avidzba, Chingiz Bigvava, Liana Achba and Mzia Beia.

During the founding congress, the organisation was addressed by former President Vladislav Ardzinba. Some speakers have distanced themselves from Amtsakhara, the veteran organisation founded shortly after the 1992-1993 war.

On 14 July 2010, Chairman Vadim Smyr announced his resignation. On 20 July, Aruaa's Supreme Council decided that it did not accept Smyr's resignation, and that he would remain Chairman at least until the next congress of the organisation.

On 10 July 2013, Aruaa signed a cooperation agreement with opposition parties United Abkhazia, Forum for the National Unity of Abkhazia, the People's Party of Abkhazia and the Party for the Economic Development of Abkhazia, and with a number of other social movements.

During its third congress on 30 July 2013, the movement elected Vitali Gabnia as its new Chairman, up until then Daur Achugba had been acting Chairman.

Following the May 2014 ouster of President Alexander Ankvab, Aruaa held an extraordinary congress on 19 June in which it supported the candidacy of Raul Khajimba and its Chairman Vitali Gabnia for the positions of respectively President and Vice President in the August election. On 12 December, Aruaa held a congress in which it welcomed the election victory of Khajimba and Gabnia and elected Ilia Gunia as its new Chairman.

On 4 March 2016, Aruaa condemned a planned referendum to hold an early presidential election.

== See also ==
- Amtsakhara
