= Abkhaz =

Abkhaz and Abkhazian may refer to:

- Something of, from, or related to Abkhazia, a de facto independent region with partial recognition as a sovereign state, otherwise recognized as part of Georgia
- Abkhaz people or Abkhazians, persons from Abkhazia or of Abkhaz descent
- Abkhaz language
- Abkhazian culture
- Abkhazian cuisine
- Abkhazi, a princely family in Georgia, a branch of the Anchabadze family from Abkhazia

== See also ==
- Abasgoi, ancient tribe likely the ancestors of the Abkhazians
