= Daur Nachkebia =

Abkhazian politician and writer

Minister for Education of Abkhazia
- In office 20 October 2011 – 15 October 2014
- President: Alexander Ankvab; Valeri Bganba (Acting)
- Prime Minister: Leonid Lakerbaia; Vladimir Delba (Acting)
- Preceded by: Indira Vardania
- Succeeded by: Adgur Kakoba

Daur Nachkebia is a writer from Abkhazia and a former Minister for Education, from 20 October 2011 until 15 October 2014, in the Government of President Ankvab. Following the election of President Raul Khajimba in 2014, Nachkebia was not re-appointed.
