= Our Home – Abkhazia =

Our Home – Abkhazia Аԥсны – Ҳара Ҳаҩны
- Leader: Raul Lolua
- Founded: 26 January 2016

Our Home – Abkhazia (Abkhaz: Аԥсны – Ҳара Ҳаҩны) is a public movement in Abkhazia, founded on 26 January 2016 and led by former Interior Minister Raul Lolua. It was registered with the Justice Ministry on 18 February and presented to the public on 3 March. Its executive committee consists of Lolua, Alkhas Tkhagushev and Sukhumi City Council Chairman Konstantin Pilia.

During the press conference on 3 March, Lolua stated that Our Home is neither pro-government nor pro-opposition, and that it does not seek to gain power, but rather to change the inefficient political system. Its first aim was a moratorium on the sale of real estate. It rejected a planned referendum to hold an early presidential election, arguing that this would not solve any underlying problems and that it favoured a transition to a parliamentary system.
