= Merzhanov =

Merzhanov (masculine, Russian: Мержа́нов) or Merzhanova (feminine, Russian: Мержа́нова) is a Russian surname. Notable people with the surname include:

- Miron Merzhanov (1895–1975), Russian Soviet architect
- Victor Merzhanov (1919–2012), Russian classical pianist
