= Rafael Ampar =

Association football player

Rafael Shlaterovich Ampar (Abkhaz: Рафаель Шлатер-иԥа Амԥар, Russian: Рафаэль Шлатерович Ампар; born 20 March 1964) is a politician from Abkhazia. In the Government of President Bagapsh, from 2005 until 2011, Ampar was Chairman of the State Committee for Youth Affairs and Sports. He was not re-appointed by Alexander Ankvab, Bagapsh's successor. In the 2014 Presidential election, Ampar was campaign manager for Leonid Dzapshba, who came in fourth and last place with 3.4% of the votes.

On 12 February 2016, Ampar was appointed Deputy Chairman of the State Committee for Physical Culture and Sports.
