= List of Stalin's residences =

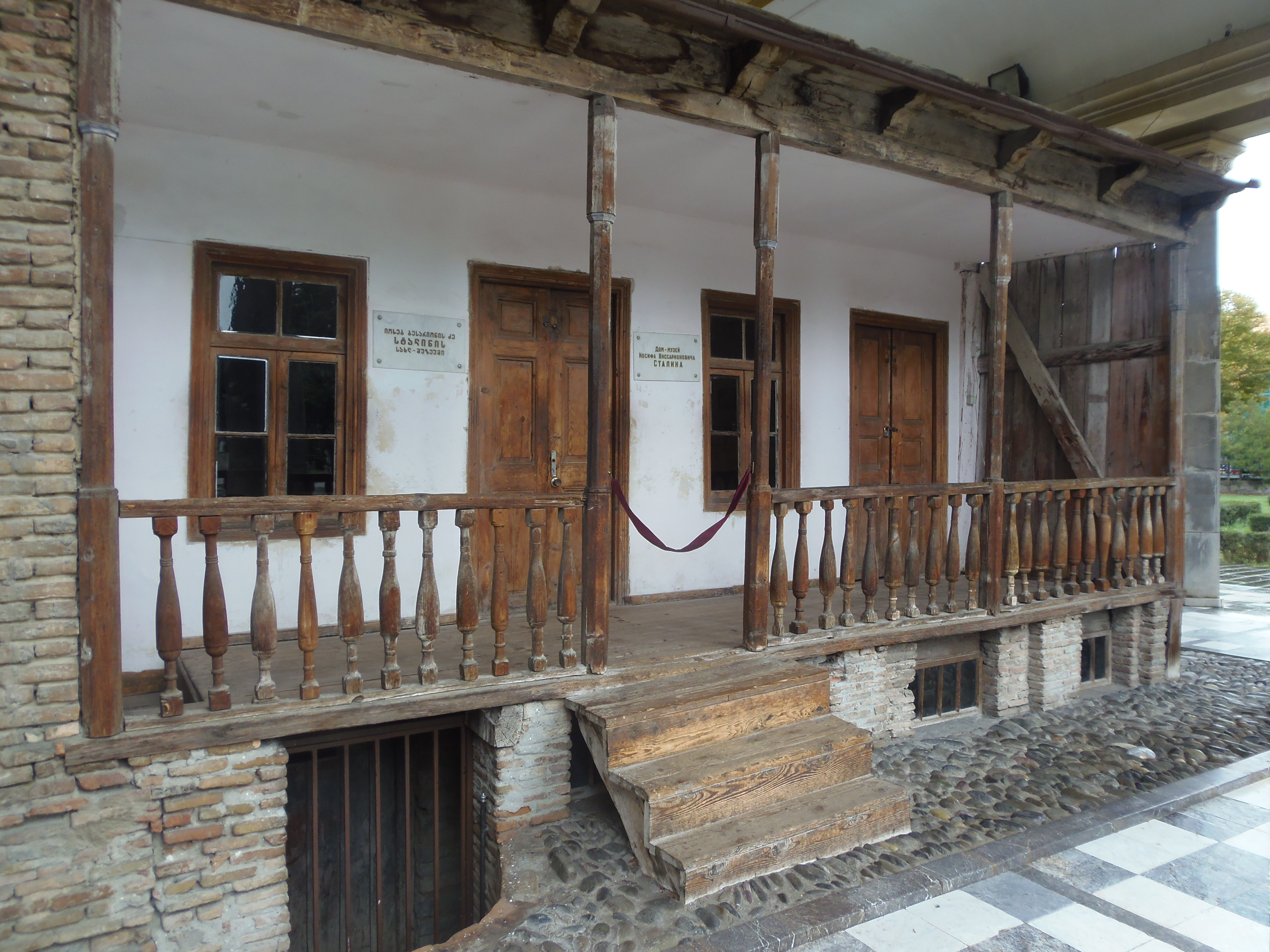
The small wooden house where Stalin was born in Gori, Georgia

Over time, Joseph Stalin resided in various places:

- Stalin's house, Gori, Georgia, his birthplace and now a museum
- Tbilisi Spiritual Seminary
- Kureika house, Siberia, where Stalin spent his final exile in 1914–1916.
- Stalin's apartment in Moscow Kremlin

== Dachas ==
Dachas in Moscow area:

- Kuntsevo Dacha ("Near Dacha")
- Uspenskoye Dacha (Far Dacha, old)
- Semyonovskoye Dacha (Far Dacha, new)
- Zubalovo dacha, the first one; not preserved
- Lipki dacha; not preserved

Elsewhere in Russia:

- Sochi dacha (Matsesta dacha)
- Bolshiye Brody dacha, Valday, Novgorod Oblast

There were 5 Stalin's dachas in Abkhazia

- New Athos dacha
- Kholodnaya Rechka dacha
- Lake Ritsa dacha
- Sukhumi dacha, amid the Sukhumi arboretum (now part of the Sukhumi botanical garden)
- Miusera dacha

He also used to stay in (former royal palaces) such as Livadia Palace, Crimea or Massandra Palace, Crimea. Alternatively, many of Stalin's dachas were used for state functions, by other high-ranking Soviet officials, and by foreign guests.
