= Vakhtang Pipia =

Chairman of Abkhazia

Chairman of the State Committee for State Property and Privatisation
- Incumbent
- Assumed office 30 August 2016
- Prime Minister: Beslan Bartsits
- Preceded by: Konstantin Katsia

Deputy Prime Minister
- In office 30 March 2011 – 10 October 2011
- Prime Minister: Sergei Shamba
- Preceded by: Daur Tarba
- Succeeded by: Beslan Eshba

Minister for Taxes and Fees
- In office 25 February 2005 – 30 March 2011
- Prime Minister: Alexander Ankvab; Sergei Shamba
- Preceded by: Adgur Lushba
- Succeeded by: Rauf Tsimtsba

Personal details
- Born: October 13, 1960 (age 65) Tkvarcheli

Vakhtang Pipia is the current chairman of the State Committee for State Property and Privatisation of Abkhazia in the Government of President Khajimba, and a former vice premier.

== Early life career ==
Pipia was born on 13 October 1960 in Tkvarcheli. From 1978 until 1983, he studied at the economics faculty of the Tbilisi State University.

Between 1983 and 1988, Pipia held various positions in the Tkvarcheli town council and the local branch of the Communist Party. From 1988 until 1990, he attended the higher party school in Baku. In November 1991, he founded the Tkvarcheli branch of the Sukhumi Commercial Bank. During the 1992–1993 with Georgia, he led the rear of the eastern front. In October 1994, he founded the Menatep-Sukhum bank. Between 1997 and 2000, Pipia gained a post-graduate degree from the Russian Presidential Academy of Public Administration.

== Political career ==
In the March 2002 election, Pipia was elected to the 3rd convocation of the People's Assembly of Abkhazia. On 19 February 2004, Pipia became one of fifteen (out of 35) founding members of the opposition faction Unity, led by Daur Tarba.

On 25 February 2005, following the election of President Sergei Bagapsh, Pipia was appointed to his government as Minister for Taxes and Fees, in the cabinet headed by Prime Minister Alexander Ankvab.

Pipia was re-appointed in the cabinet of Sergei Shamba in 2009, following the re-election of Bagapsh. On 30 March 2011, Pipia was appointed Vice Premier, succeeding Daur Tarba who had resigned. Two months later, Bagapsh died, and in October 2011, Pipia was not re-appointed by Ankvab, who succeeded Bagapsh as president.

On 30 August 2016, Pipia became part of the Government of President Khajimba when he was appointed head of the State Committee for State Property and Privatisation in the cabinet of Prime Minister Beslan Bartsits.
