= Ainar =

Ainar Аинар
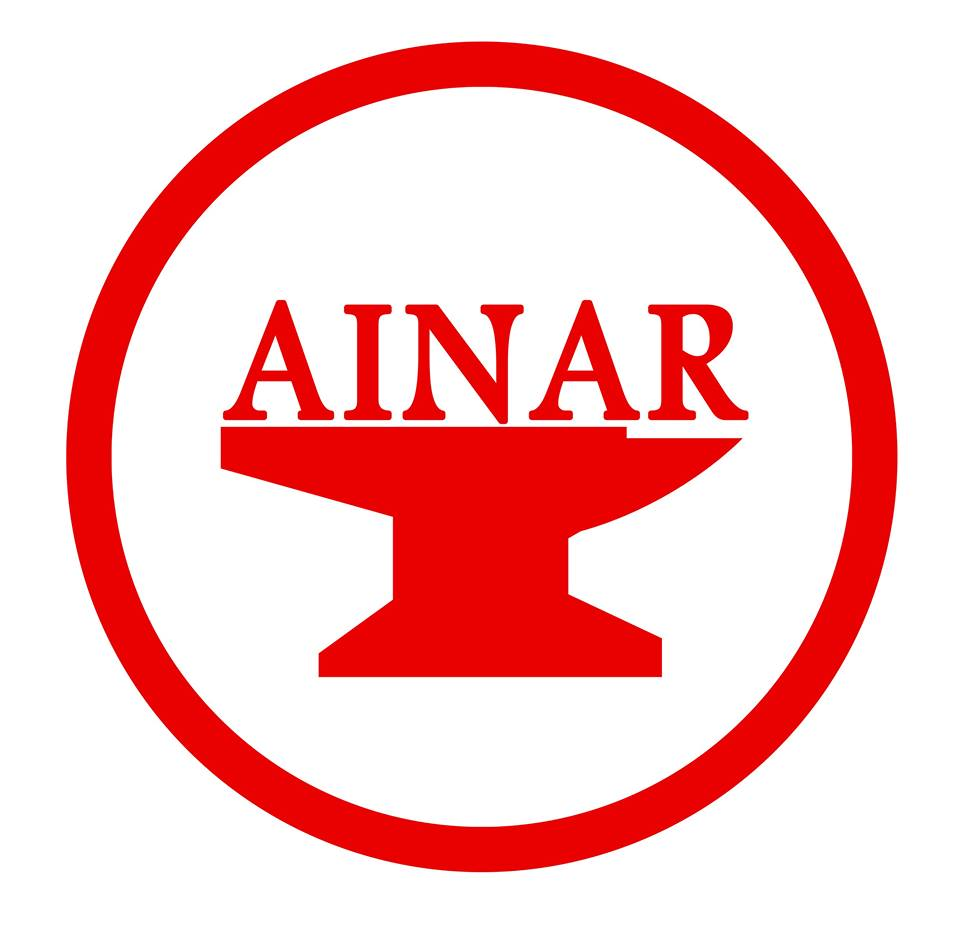
- Leader: Tengiz Jopua
- Founded: 2010
- Ideology: Direct democracy Apsuara
- Colours: Red, white

Website
- Ainar

Ainar (Abkhaz: Аинар) is a political party in Abkhazia.

== Foundation ==
Ainar was founded in 2010 as a think tank styling itself as 'expert promotion fund'. On 4 September 2015, Ainar held a congress, opened by MP Almas Japua, in which it transformed itself into a political party. The congress elected Tengiz Jopua as its first Chairman and Batal Katsia, Adgur Lagvilava, Dmitri Gabelia and Beslan Bartsyts as the remaining members of its political council.

The goals of Ainar are amongst other things the advancement of direct democracy and of Apsuara (the Abkhaz system of spiritual values and behavioral norms).
