= Stalin's Dacha =

Joseph Stalin's personal residence

Kuntsevo Dacha
- Бли́жняя да́ча
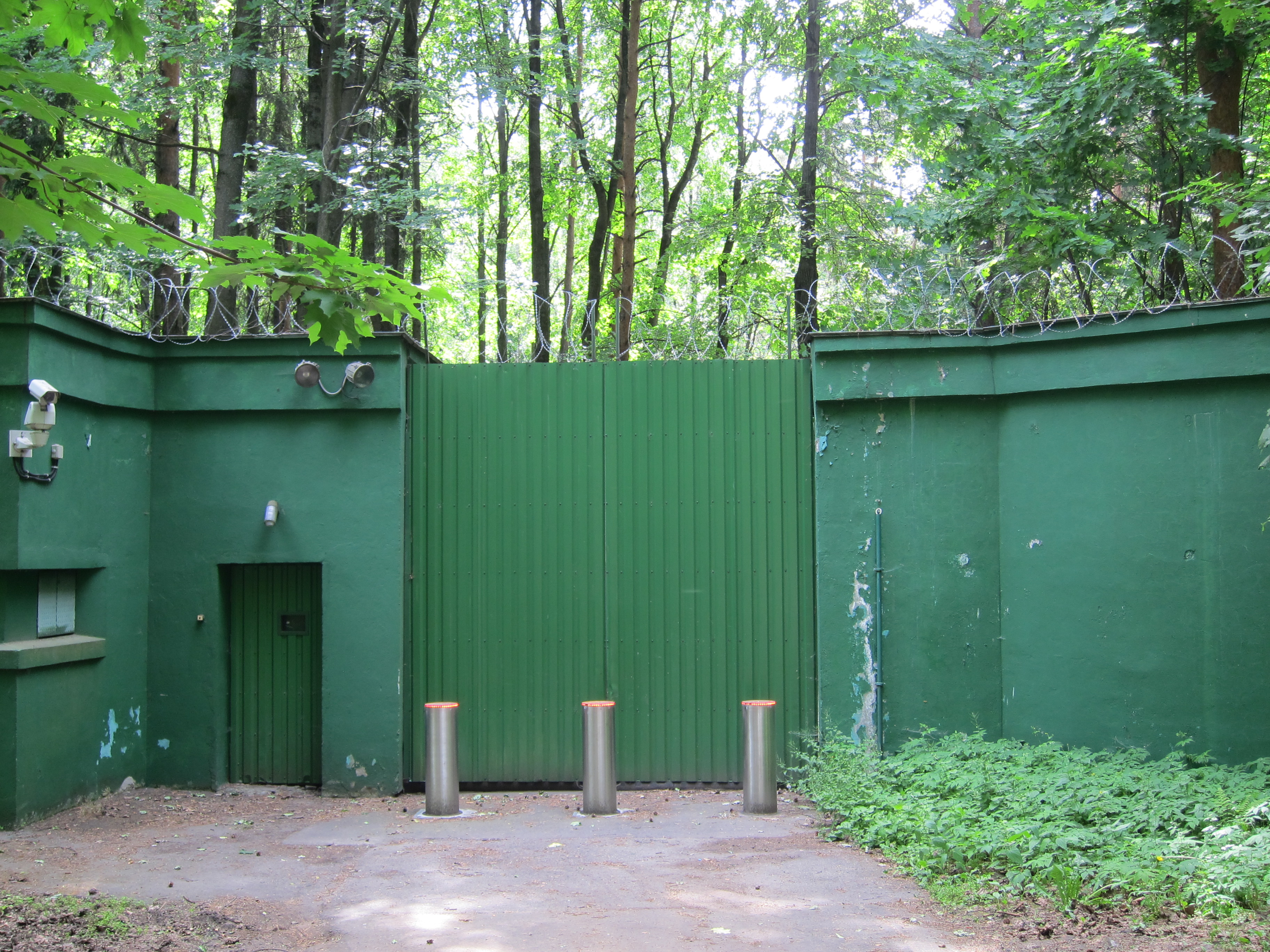
- Gate to the dacha

- Location within Moscow Ring Road
- Alternative names: Blizhnyaya Dacha

General information
- Type: Dacha
- Location: Kuntsevo, Moscow, Russia
- Coordinates: 55°43′28″N 37°29′09″E
- Completed: 1934
- Client: Joseph Stalin

Design and construction
- Architect: Miron Merzhanov

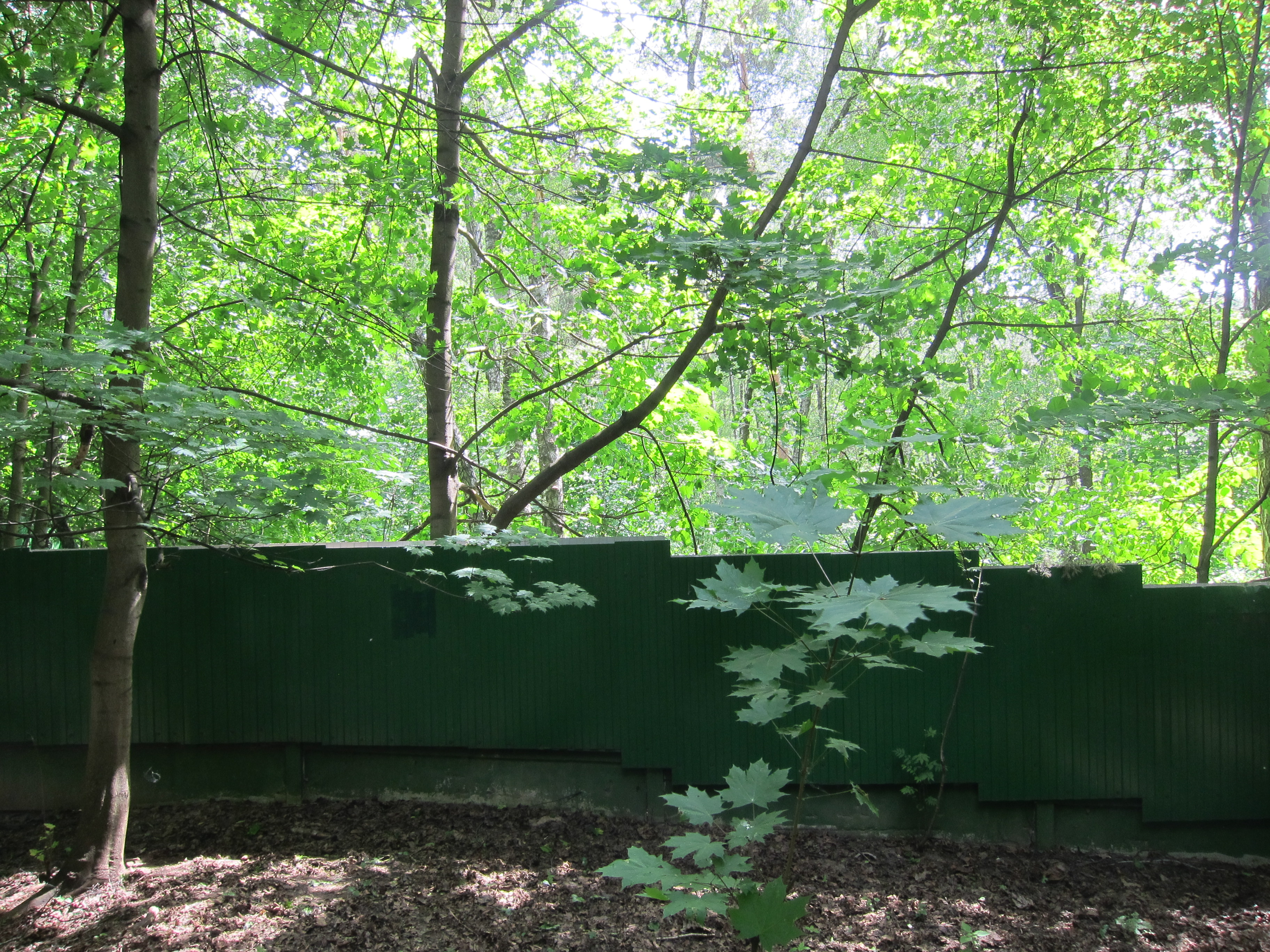
Summer cottage fence

Stalin's Dacha, also known as the Kuntsevo Dacha, (Russian: Ку́нцевская да́ча, romanized: Kuntsevskaya dacha) was Joseph Stalin's personal residence between Moscow and Davydkovo (then in Moscow Oblast, now part of Moscow's Fili district), where he lived for the last two decades of his life and died on 5 March 1953. The dacha is located in a forest not far from the modern-day Victory Park.

Also called the "nearer dacha" (Russian: Ближняя дача, romanized: Blizhnyaya Dacha, as distinct from the "far dachas"), it was built in 1933–34 to Miron Merzhanov's designs. A second floor was added to the original building in 1943. Stalin lived in the Kuntsevo dacha (which incorporated a bomb-shelter) during World War II. There, he played host to such high-profile guests as Winston Churchill (in August 1942) and Mao Zedong (in December 1949).

== Description ==
The dacha is located at the heart of a densely wooded birch forest; its defenses included a double-perimeter fence, camouflaged 30-millimeter antiaircraft guns, and a security force of three hundred NKVD (after 1946, MGB) special troops. The grounds included a small pond, apple and lemon trees, a rose garden and a watermelon patch which Stalin liked to cultivate. There was also a sports ground for playing gorodki.

Upon entering the dacha, there was a lobby with two cloakrooms. To the left, a door opened to Stalin's personal study, where he spent most of the day. Directly in front, a door opened to the large dining room, while to the right there was a long, narrow corridor.

The rectangular dining room was dominated by a long polished table and covered with rose colored carpets. The room was decorated with images of Vladimir Lenin and of the writer Maxim Gorky. It was in this room that Stalin welcomed the Soviet Politburo for meetings and late-night dinners and where important decisions were often made. An "almost invisible" door located on one side of the dining room led to a kitchen and Stalin's bedroom.

On the left-hand side of the dacha, there was Stalin's personal study (where he spent most of the day when at Kuntsevo) with his large war-time desk, a radio that was a gift from Winston Churchill (presented during Churchill's first visit to Moscow, in August 1942) and a couch; Stalin usually slept on this couch, instead of in his bedroom. The bathroom was located next to Stalin's study.

On the right-hand side, the long narrow corridor led initially to two bedrooms (mostly used for accommodating occasional guests) and eventually to a large open veranda. Stalin spent much time on this veranda; even during very cold winter weather, he would often sit in a chair, wearing a warm sheepskin coat and a fur hat. He also liked to read books and reports and feed the birds while on the veranda.

Stalin seldom visited the second floor of the dacha, although an elevator had been installed on his orders. The entire upper floor was originally intended to accommodate his daughter Svetlana Alliluyeva, but she seldom stayed there for more than a few days each year. As a result, the upstairs rooms remained dark and empty for most of the time.

After Stalin's death the Marx–Engels–Lenin–Stalin Institute set up a commission to make arrangements for a Stalin museum at Kuntsevo. Nikita Khrushchev rejected the idea, and for several decades the dacha remained unoccupied.

Stalin's daughter Svetlana reported that a copy of the famous painting Reply of the Zaporozhian Cossacks was hung somewhere on the ground floor of the dacha but was not clear on the precise location.

== The dacha today ==
The building remains shrouded in secrecy: the grounds are fenced and closed to the public. However, the dacha is still preserved in good condition, along with all of Stalin's personal belongings, including his study with the war-time desk and the sofa where he slept.

Upon becoming President of the Russian Federation in 2000, Vladimir Putin summoned the most powerful business oligarchs of Russia to Kuntsevo in what Sergei Pugachev (a participant in that meeting) described as a "very symbolic" move; another participant, Mikhail Khodorkovsky, said that by summoning them to Kuntsevo and by sitting in Stalin's office, Putin "wanted us to understand that we, as big businessmen, may have some power, but it is nothing compared to his power as the head of state." (Khodorkovsky "did not take that message to heart" and wound up serving ten years in prison on charges of tax evasion.)
