= Beslan Khagba =

Abkhazian politician (born 1956)

Beslan Badrovich Khagba (Russian: Беслан Бадрович Хагба; born 23 May 1956) is a former Minister for Internal Affairs of Abkhazia. He served from May 2015 to October 2015, when he was replaced by Leonid Dzapshba.

== Early life ==
He was born 23 May 1956 in Gudauta. He graduated from the Faculty of Law of Rostov State University and then from 1978 to 1980 he served in the Soviet Army. After, he worked in various positions in the North Caucasian Transport Prosecutor's Office in Rostov-on-Don. From 1988 to 1992 he was Deputy Prosecutor of the Sukhumi District. From 1993 to 2003 he was Prosecutor of Gagra, and then from 2003 to 2005 he was the Prosecutor of the Gagra District. He was relieved from the post in May 2005 at his own request.

== Minister for Internal Affairs ==
In May 2015, following two confrontations between police officers and members of the State Security Service, Interior Minister Raul Lolua handed in his resignation. It was accepted by President Khajimba on the evening of 14 May, and he appointed Khagba as his successor.

On 9 October, Khagba was dismissed by Khajimba and replaced by Leonid Dzapshba, who had already been Interior Minister from 2010 to 2011. It was speculated he left because he did not provide noticeable results during his ministerial career.

== Post-ministerial role ==
Khagba has been a political scientist since his termination from the post. In 2025 he commented on the upcoming elections, expressing skepticism towards opposition candidates' campaign promises and calling them populist and unrealistic, and that they need to gain Russian confidence for their investment.
