= Bocharov Ruchey =

Summer presidential residence in Sochi, Russia

Coordinates: 43°37′0″N 39°42′10″E

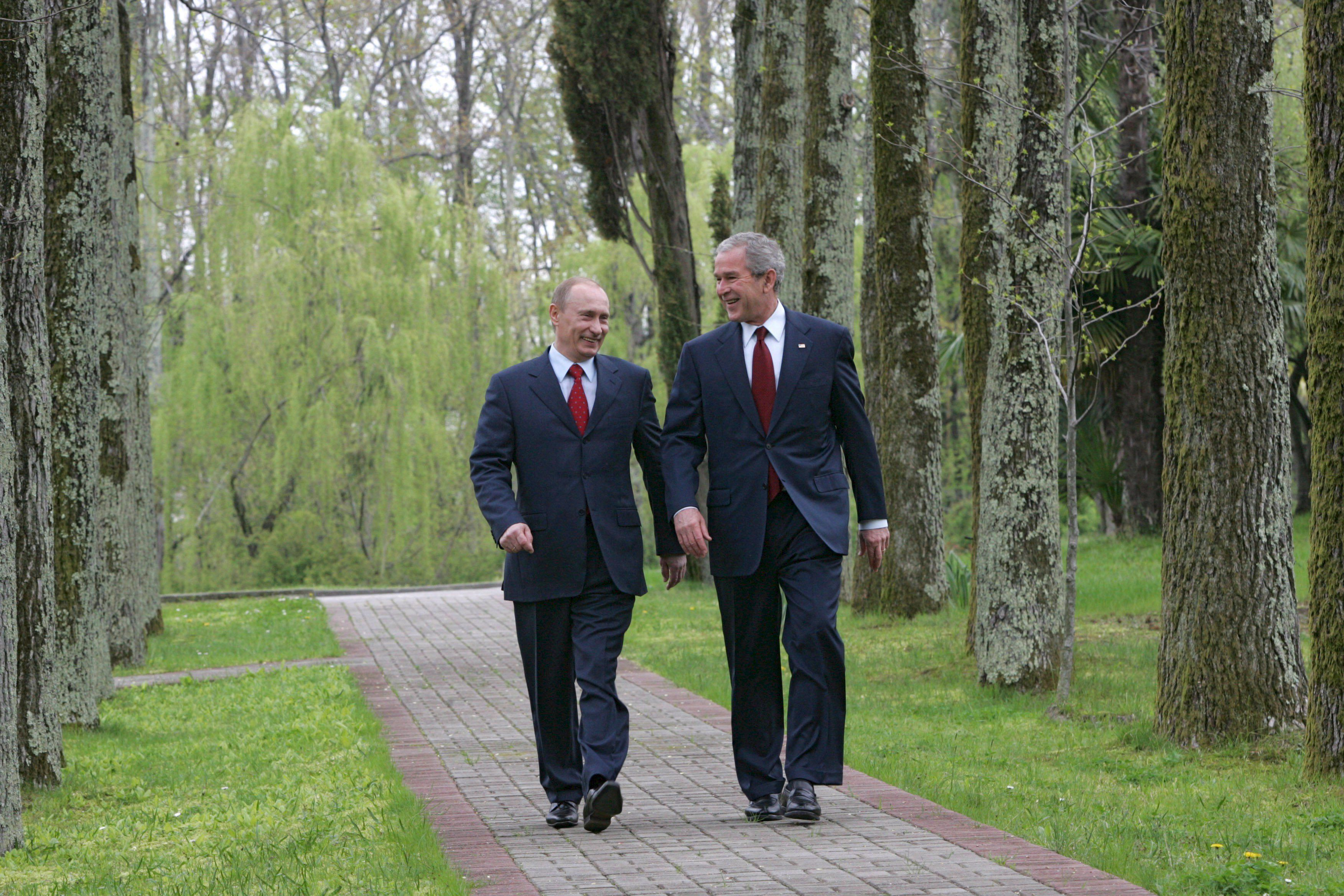
U.S. President George W. Bush and Russian President Vladimir Putin walking outside the residence, April 2008.

Bocharov Ruchey (Russian: Бочаров Ручей, "Cooper's Brook") was the summer residence of the President of Russia. It was located in the Tsentralny city district of Sochi, Russia.

The Bocharov Ruchey residence was commissioned by the People's Commissar for Military and Naval Affairs, Kliment Voroshilov, and completed in 1955. Miron Merzhanov was the project architect, while Sergei Venchagov was the landscape designer.

The venue was used by President Vladimir Putin to host US President George W. Bush in 2008. Putin is also reported to have used the residence to celebrate the birthday of his rumoured partner Alina Kabayeva, and was reported to have stayed inside during the peak of the COVID-19 pandemic. In 2024, the Russian independent investigative outlet Proekt reported that the residence's main building had been demolished and replaced by a construction project in the beginning of the year, and that Putin had stopped visiting the venue since March 2024 due to concerns over a possible drone attack by Ukraine.
