= Rauf Tsimtsba =

Abkhazian politician (born 1956)

3rd Minister for Taxes and Fees of Abkhazia
- In office 8 April 2015 – 1 November 2016
- Prime Minister: Artur Mikvabia
- Succeeded by: Daur Kurmazia
- In office 4 April 2011 – 15 October 2014
- Prime Minister: Sergei Shamba; Leonid Lakerbaia
- Preceded by: Vakhtang Pipia

Personal details
- Born: 23 November 1956 (age 69) Gagra, Abkhazian ASSR, Georgian SSR, USSR

Rauf Aslanovich Tsimtsba (Abkhaz: Рауф Аслан-иҧа Цымцба, Russian: Рауф Асланович Цимцба; born 23 November 1956) was the third Minister for Taxes and Fees of Abkhazia, serving between 2011 and 2016 in the Governments of President Bagapsh, President Ankvab and President Khajimba. Tsimtsba was originally appointed on 4 April 2011 by Sergei Bagapsh to succeed Vakhtang Pipia, who had been appointed Vice Premier on 30 March. Before that, Tsimtsba had headed the Department for the Taxation of Legal Entities within the ministry. Following the Death of Bagapsh one month later and the election of Alexander Ankvab, Tsimtsba was re-appointed on 11 October.

When Raul Khajimba was elected as President in 2014, he abolished the Ministry for Taxes and Fees on 15 October, turning it into the State Tax Service, which Tsimtsba was appointed to head on 17 October. In the government of Prime Minister Artur Mikvabia, the Ministry for Taxes and Fees was re-established, and Tsimtsba was re-appointed as Minister on 8 April 2015. Following the appointment of Beslan Bartsits as Prime Minister, Tsimtsba was replaced by Daur Kurmazia, but he was praised by President Khajimba and promised a future position in government.
