= Culture of Abkhazia =

Abkhazia (Abkhaz: Аҧсны, Apsny, Georgian: აფხაზეთი, Apkhazeti or Abkhazeti, Russian: Абха́зия, Abkhazia) is a region in the Southern Caucasus, on the eastern coast of the Black Sea.

== Epigraphy ==
Epigraphy of Abkhazia comprises all the epigraphic monuments (inscriptions written on hard material) inside the territory of Abkhazia. They are all in Georgian, Greek, Ottoman and Latin languages. The number of the Georgian epigraphic monuments is more than 100 and they date from the 8th century AD. The Greek inscriptions are up to 22 and they mostly date before the 9th century AD. Out of the Ottoman Turkish inscriptions, the oldest one is from 1598. Out of the Georgian inscriptions up to 15 mention the kings of Abkhazia. About 30 inscriptions are seen on icons from Bedia, Bichvinta, Tsebelda and Ilori churches. Georgian inscriptions can be divided into three groups according to their method of execution: lapidary inscriptions (about 50), mural inscriptions (about 30), and embossed inscriptions (about 20).

== Religion ==
The population (including all ethnic groups) of Abkhazia are majority Orthodox Christians and Sunni Muslims. Most of the ethnic Armenians living in Abkhazia belong to the Armenian Apostolic Church. However, most of the people who declare themselves Christian or Muslim do not attend religious services. There is also a very small number of Jews, Jehovah's Witnesses and the followers of new religions. The Jehovah's Witnesses organization has officially been banned since 1995, though the decree is not currently enforced.

According to the constitutions of Georgia, Autonomous Republic of Abkhazia and de facto Republic of Abkhazia the adherents of all religions (as well as atheists) have equal rights before the law.

Abkhazia is recognized by the Eastern Orthodox world as a canonical territory of the Georgian Orthodox Church, which has been unable to operate in the region since the War in Abkhazia. Currently, the religious affairs of local Orthodox Christian community is run by the self-imposed "Eparchy of Abkhazia" under significant influence of the Russian Orthodox Church.

== Education ==
Until 19th century young people from Abkhazia usually received their education mainly at religious schools (Muslims at Madrasas and Christians at Seminaries), although a small number of children from wealthy families had opportunity to travel to foreign countries for education. The first modern educational institutions (both schools and colleges) in Abkhazia were established in the late 19th-early 20th century and rapidly grew until the second half of the 20th century.

Children in Abkhazia begin their education at the age of 6, and graduate at 17. Official estimates put the total number of school children at about 28,000 who are enrolled into 155 schools. Russian is taught in all schools.

By the middle of the 20th century, Sukhumi became a home for largest educational institutions (both higher education institutions and Technical Vocational Education and Training (TVET) colleges) and largest students' community in Abkhazia. For example, the number of college students grew from few dozens in the 1920s to several thousands in the 1980s.

According to the official statistical data, Abkhazia has 12 TVET colleges (as of 2019, est.) providing education and vocational training to youth mostly in the capital city, though there are several colleges in all major district centers. Independent international assessments suggest that these colleges train in about 20 different specialties attracting between 1200 and 1500 young people annually (aged between 16 and 29) (as of 2019, est.). The largest colleges are as follows:

Abkhaz Multiindustrial College (1959) (from 1959 to 1999 - Sukhumi Trade and Culinary School),

Sukhumi State College (1904) (from 1904 to 1921 - Sukhumi Real School; from 1921 to 1999 - Sukhumi Industrial Technical School),

Sukhumi Art College (1935),

Sukhum Medical College (1931)

Higher education in Abkhazia currently is represented by one university, Abkhazian State University, which has a special status in the education system in Abkhazia and it manages its own budget. Between 2000 and 2020, a small number of school graduates from Abkhazia have received higher education in other countries under different scholarship programs and themes, covering bachelor, master and PhD education.

Abkhaz State University (1979), has its own campus which is a home for 42 departments organized into 8 faculties providing education to about 3300 students (as of 2019, est.).

== Sport ==
Football was the most popular sport in Abkhazia during Soviet times. The main club of the republic, Dinamo Sukhumi, played mostly in the lower leagues of Soviet football. However, Abkhazia produced several football talents who played in the top Georgian team FC Dinamo Tbilisi and in other Soviet teams. Natives of Abkhazia Vitaly Daraselia, Nikita (Mkrtych) Simonian, Avtandil Gogoberidze, Niyazbey Dzyapshipa, Giorgi Gavasheli, Temuri Ketsbaia and Akhrik Tsveiba were among the most prominent footballers of the Soviet Union. In 2016 Abkhazia hosted and won the ConIFA World Football Cup.

The majority of Abkhazia's population have Russian citizenship so Abkhazian sportsmen participate in international competitions as Russian citizens. They had their biggest successes in boxing (2005 European Champion David Arshba; 2006 Russian Championship prize-winner Aslan Akhba) and freestyle wrestling (2006 American Airlines Freestyle Wrestling Tournament winner Denis Tsargush).

National Basketball Team of Abkhazia played its first game with the Turkish Republic of Northern Cyprus Basketball team on 27 May 2015, which Abkhaz team won by 76-59. Abkhaz basketball team "Apsny" also plays in the Russian Basketball League's Third-Tier in Krasnodar Krai.

Since early 2000 tennis has become increasingly popular among school age children in Abkhazia. Several tennis players from Sukhumi participated as the national competitions in Russia and played at major international competitions under the Russian flag. For example, tennis player Alen Avidzba participated at the Davis Cup in 2016 and Amina Anshba won a silver medal at an international tournament in Turkey in 2017. In fact, according to the official information from the Tennis portal.ru the highest career achievement of Amina Anshba was 355th place in the ranking among women in 2020

== Literature ==
The written Abkhaz language literature appeared relatively recently in the beginning of the 20th century, although Abkhaz oral tradition is quite rich. In 1892, Dmitry Gulia and his Georgian teacher at the Gori Teachers' Seminary, Konstantin Machavariani, created a new version of the Abkhaz alphabet, which enabled the development of a written Abkhaz language. The first newspaper in Abkhaz, called Abkhazia (Apsny) and edited by Dmitry Gulia, appeared in 1917. It was replaced by the Apsny Kapsh (Аҧсны ҟаҧшь, meaning Red Abkhazia) newspaper after the Soviet rule was established. Arguably the most famous Abkhaz writer, Fazil Iskander, wrote mostly in Russian. He was renowned in the former Soviet Union for the vivid descriptions of Caucasian life. He is probably best known in the English-speaking world for Sandro of Chegem, a picturesque novel that recounts life in a fictional Abkhaz village from the early years of the 20th century until the 1970s. This rambling, amusing, and ironic work has been considered as an example of magic realism, although Iskander himself said he "did not care for Latin American magic realism in general".

== Museums ==
Museums in Abkhazia include the following.

Name	Region	Location	Image	Type	Notes	Coordinance
Abkhazian State Museum	Gagra	Sukhumi		State		
Hetsuriani House Museum		Lidzava				
Abaat Historical Museum				Historical		
Dacha of Stalin		New Athos				
Museum of the Abkhazian Kingdom						
Museum of Military Glory		New Athos		Military		

== See also ==
- Culture of Georgia (country)
- Media in Abkhazia
