= Zurab Marshan =

Abkhazian politician

Minister for Health of Abkhazia
- In office 25 February 2005 – 15 October 2014
- President: Sergei Bagapsh; Alexander Ankvab; Valeri Bganba (Acting)
- Prime Minister: Alexander Ankvab; Sergei Shamba; Leonid Lakerbaia; Vladimir Delba (Acting)
- Preceded by: Lyudmila Avidzba
- Succeeded by: David Gunba

Zurab Marshan was Minister for Health of Abkhazia from 25 February 2005 until 15 October 2014, in the Governments of President Bagapsh and President Ankvab. Marshan was first appointed after the election of Sergei Bagapsh in 2005. He was re-appointed on 28 October 2011 by Alexander Ankvab following Bagapsh's death. He was not re-appointed by Raul Khajimba after his election in 2014.
