= Aslan Kobakhia =

Abkhazian politician (born 1960)

Minister for Internal Affairs of Abkhazia
- Incumbent
- Assumed office 16 August 2016
- Preceded by: Leonid Dzapshba

Chairman of the State Committee for Customs of Abkhazia
- In office 1997 – 18 December 2002
- Preceded by: Aleksandr Aiba
- Succeeded by: Grigori Enik

Personal details
- Born: 23 March 1960 (age 66) Lykhny

Aslan Kobakhia is one of three current Vice Premiers and the current Minister for Internal Affairs of Abkhazia.

== Early life and education ==
Aslan Kobakhia was born on 23 March 1960 in Lykhny, Gudauta District. Between 1981 and 1985 he studied at the Economics Faculty of the Abkhazian State University.

== Political career ==
In 1997, Kobakhia became Chairman of the State Committee for Customs in the Government of President Ardzinba under Prime Minister Sergei Bagapsh. He was re-appointed under Prime Ministers Viacheslav Tsugba and Anri Jergenia. On 18 December 2002, following the appointment of Gennadi Gagulia as Prime Minister, Kobakhia was replaced by Gagra District Head Grigori Enik.

In the March 2012 election, Kobakhia was elected to the 5th convocation of the People's Assembly of Abkhazia in constituency no. 2 (Sukhumi). He won a 25.35% plurality in the first round over six other candidates and defeated Akhra Abukhba in the run-off. Kobakhia had been nominated by the opposition Forum for the National Unity of Abkhazia and became one of four of its eleven candidates to be elected to the 35-member Parliament.

On 16 August 2016, Kobakhia entered the Government of President Khajimba when he was appointed as one of three Vice Premiers and Minister for Internal Affairs in the cabinet of Prime Minister Beslan Bartsits.

Political offices
Preceded by Aleksandr Aiba	Chairman of the State Committee for Customs; 1997–2002	Succeeded by Grigori Enik
Preceded by Leonid Dzapshba	Minister for Internal Affairs; 2016–present	Incumbent
