= Minister of Finance (Abkhazia) =

The Minister of Finance of the Republic of Abkhazia (Russian: Министр финансов Республики Абхазия; Abz: Аԥсны Аҳәынҭқарра афинансқәа рминистр) is the head of the Ministry of Finance of the Republic of Abkhazia. The Minister of Finance is appointed to office and removed from office by the President of the Republic of Abkhazia.

== List of Finance Ministers of Abkhazia ==
Took office	Resignation from office	Minister
21 December 1993	2005	Lili Bganba
24 February 2005	10 October 2011	Beslan Kubrava
10 October 2011	17 October 2014	Vladimir Delba
17 October 2014	12 August 2016	Amra Kvarandzia
12 August 2016	19 February 2018	Dmitri Serikov
19 February 2018	30 April 2018	Irma Amichba (acting)
30 April 2018	28 April 2020	Jansukh Nanba
28 April 2020	3 March 2025	Vladimir Delba
18 April 2025 (Acting since 3 March)	-	Saud Gubaz
