= Nugzar Logua =

Abkhazian politician and painter

Chairman of Apsadgyl
- Incumbent
- Assumed office 6 October 2016
- Preceded by: Beslan Eshba

Minister for Culture of Abkhazia
- In office 10 March 2005 – 13 October 2011
- Prime Minister: Alexander Ankvab; Sergei Shamba
- Preceded by: Leonid Enik
- Succeeded by: Badr Gunba

Personal details
- Born: April 20, 1956 (age 70) Chlou, Ochamchira District
- Party: Apsadgyl (since 2015); Aitaira (since 2003)

Nugzar Logua (Abkhaz: Нугзар Ҷиҷикәа-иҧа Логуа; born 20 April 1956) is a painter, poet and politician from Abkhazia. He is the current chairman of the socio-political organisation Apsadgyl and a former Minister for Culture in the Government of President Bagapsh.

== Early life and career ==
Logua was born on 20 April 1956 in the village of Chlou in Ochamchira District. Between 1974 and 1979, he studied at the Art School in Sukhumi, and between 1982 and 1988, painting at the fine arts faculty of the State Academy for Art in Tbilisi. After his graduation, he returned to the Art School in Sukhumi, where he taught painting from 1989 until 1997. From 1997 until 2001, Logua was Chairman of the Union of Artists of Abkhazia.

== Political career ==
In 2003, Logua became an active member of Aitaira, and he joined its political council in 2004. Following the election of Aitaira-supported Sergei Bagapsh as president, Logua was appointed Minister for Culture on 10 March 2005 in the cabinet of Prime Minister Alexander Ankvab. Following the re-election of Bagapsh, Logua was re-appointed in the cabinet of Prime Minister Sergei Shamba. After the death of Bagapsh in 2011, Logua did not return as Minister under Ankvab, his successor.

Logua became one of the leaders of Apsadgyl when it was transformed into a socio-political organisation in 2015. On 6 October 2016, he was elected chairman by Apsadgyl's executive committee to replace Beslan Eshba who had been appointed Vice Premier.
