= Daur Tarba =

Abkhazian politician (born 1959)

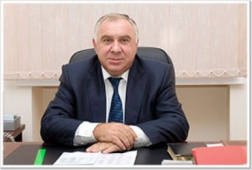

Minister for Agriculture
- Incumbent
- Assumed office 24 August 2016
- Prime Minister: Beslan Bartsits
- Preceded by: Timur Eshba

Vice Premier
- In office 24 February 2010 – 4 March 2011
- Prime Minister: Sergei Shamba
- Preceded by: Leonid Lakerbaia
- Succeeded by: Vakhtang Pipia

2nd Chairman of United Abkhazia
- In office 27 January 2009 – 1 October 2015
- Preceded by: Artur Mikvabia
- Succeeded by: Sergei Shamba

Head of Ochamchira District
- In office 3 April 2007 – 18 December 2008
- Preceded by: Ramaza Jopua
- Succeeded by: Murman Jopua

Chairman of the State Committee for State Property and Privatisation of Abkhazia
- In office 24 February 2005 – 24 May 2007
- Prime Minister: Alexander Ankvab
- Preceded by: Aleksandr Chengelia
- Succeeded by: Konstantin Katsia

Personal details
- Party: United Abkhazia

Daur Tarba (Abkhaz: Даур Ҭарба, Georgian: დაურ თარბა), born June 2, 1959, is the current Minister for Agriculture of Abkhazia. In the past, he has also been Chairman of United Abkhazia at a time when it was the ruling party, Vice Premier and head of the Ochamchira District.

== Early life ==
Tarba was born on June 2, 1959 in the village of Mokvi, Ochamchire District. He served in the Soviet army, being posted to Vietnam, and receiving the Order of the Socialist Republic of Vietnam.

Targa graduated from the Faculty of Law of the Abkhaz State University, then continued his studies at the Nizhny Novgorod Social and Political Institute.

During the 1992-93 conflict between Georgia and Abkhazia, he fought in the Ochamchire district.

== Career ==
In 1991, Tarba was elected as a deputy of the Supreme Council of Abkhazia.

After the election of Sergei Bagapsh as president of Abkhazia, Tarba was appointed head of the State Committee for State Property and Privatisation 24 February 2005. On 3 April 2007 Tarba was appointed head of the Ochamchira District. On 18 December 2008 Tarba was at his own request released from this post, and on 27 January 2009, during the congress in which the socio-political movement United Abkhazia was transformed into a political party, Tarba became its new chairman.

After the re-election of Sergei Bagapsh as president, Tarba was appointed Vice Premier on 24 February 2010. However, on 25 February 2011, Tarba announced that he was resigning, without specifying a reason. His resignation was approved by President Bagapsh on 4 March. On 30 March, he was succeeded by Minister for Taxes and Levies Vakhtang Pipia.

Tarba resigned as Chairman of United Abkhazia on 1 October 2015 in a letter to its political council, in which he identified excessive formalism and a lack of internal political debates, and called for the party's rejuvenation. The political council accepted his resignation and appointed Aleksei Tania as acting Chairman.

In the sidelines of the party congress that followed Tarba's resignation, it was said that Tarba had resigned specifically to make room for his successor, long-time friend, former Prime Minister and sitting MP Sergei Shamba.

On 24 August 2016, Tarba was appointed Agriculture Minister in the cabinet of the new Prime Minister Beslan Bartsits, succeeding Timur Eshba.

== Awards and honors ==
Tarba received the Order of the Socialist Republic of Vietnam after serving there with the Soviet Army. He also received a Pride of Russia medal in honor of the 200th anniversary of Abkhazia’s entry into the Russian Empire. He has also been awarded the Order of "Akhdz-Apsha" of the third degree, and is a Knight of the Order of Peter the Great of the Ministry of Defense of the Russian Federation.
