= Agubedia =

Agubedia Georgian: აგუბედია Abkhaz: Агәы-Бедиа
- Location within Georgia Location within Abkhazia
- Coordinates: 42°45′59″N 41°40′12″E
- Country: Georgia
- Partially recognized independent country: Abkhazia
- District: Tkvarcheli

Population (2011)
  - Total: 787
- Time zone: UTC+3 (MSK)
  - Summer (DST): UTC+4

Agubedia (Georgian: აგუბედია; Abkhaz: Агәы-Бедиа) is a village in the Tkvarcheli District of Abkhazia, a partially-recognized state but nominally part of Georgia. As of 2011, the village had a population of 787, of which 75.7% were ethnic Abkhaz and 23.1% were ethnic Georgians with others being Russians, Mingrelians and Ukrainians.
