= Raul Lolua =

Abkhaz politician

Raul Lolua (Russian: Рауль Валериевич Лолуа) is a former Minister for Internal Affairs of Abkhazia.

Following the May 2014 Revolution, Lolua, previously Head of the State Security Service's Special Forces Centre, was appointed First Deputy Minister for Internal Affairs on 9 June 2014 and charged with carrying out the duties of Minister Otar Khetsia, who was (put) on paid leave. On 4 August, acting President Valeri Bganba dismissed Khetsia and appointed Lolua as Acting Minister. Lolua was appointed permanently on 15 October 2014 by newly elected President Raul Khajimba.

In May 2015, following two confrontations between police officers and members of the State Security Service, Lolua handed in his resignation. It was accepted by President Khajimba on the evening of 14 May, and he appointed Beslan Khagba as his successor.

On 26 January 2016, Lolua founded the public organisation Our Home – Abkhazia. During its presentation to the public on 3 March, Lolua stated that Our Home is neither pro-government nor pro-opposition, and that it does not seek to gain power, but rather to change the inefficient political system, and that its first aim was a moratorium on the sale of real estate. He rejected the planned referendum to hold an early presidential election, arguing that this would not solve any underlying problems and that Our Home favoured a transition to a parliamentary system.

In the run-up to the referendum, Lolua co-signed an appeal with his predecessors Otar Khetsia and Abesalom Beia to President Khajimba to dismiss then Interior Minister Leonid Dzapshba over a speech he had given to officials at the Ministry that angered opposition activists, who claimed Dzapshba had pressured the officials not to participate in the referendum and threatened them with dismissal. Dzapshba was eventually suspended on 5 July after some opposition activists had stormed the Ministry.
