= Vitali Gabnia =

Vitali Gabnia Виталик Габниа Виталий Габния

5th Vice President of Abkhazia
- In office 25 September 2014 – 22 August 2018
- President: Raul Khajimba
- Preceded by: Mikhail Logua
- Succeeded by: Aslan Bartsits

Personal details
- Born: 12 June 1968 Sukhumi, Abkhazian ASSR, Georgian SSR, Soviet Union
- Children: 2
- Education: Abkhazian State University

Military service
- Allegiance: Soviet Union; Abkhazia
- Branch/service: Soviet Army
- Years of service: 1986–1990

Vitali Viktorovich Gabnia (Abkhaz: Виталик Виктор-иҧа Габниа; Russian: Виталий Викторович Габния) was Vice President of Abkhazia from 2014 to 2018. He was elected along with President Raul Khajimba following the May 2014 revolution against previous President Alexander Ankvab, which Khajimba and he had led. Gabnia is Chairman of the veterans organisation Aruaa. He resigned after being caught in a brawl in August 2018.

== Career ==
Gabnia was elected as Chairman of Aruaa during its congress on 30 July 2013, succeeding acting Chairman Daur Achugba and following the resignation of previous Chairman Vadim Smyr.

On 22 August 2018, Gabnia announced his resignation as vice-president, citing the need to "defend his honor" after being caught in a brawl and being hit in his head. He added the offender was not brought to justice due to the existing "system of lawlessness", but his resignation was not connected to "political realities".
