= Valery Arshba =

Vice President of Abkhazia

Valery Arshba Валерии Аршба

Head of the Presidential Administration of Abkhazia
- In office 15 February 2005 – 1 March 2010
- President: Sergei Bagapsh
- Preceded by: Emma Avidzba
- Succeeded by: Grigori Enik

1st Vice President of Abkhazia
- In office 5 January 1995 – 12 February 2005
- President: Vladislav Ardzinba
- Succeeded by: Raul Khajimba

Personal details
- Born: 4 October 1949 (age 76) Tkvarcheli, Abkhazia

Valery Arshba (Abkhaz: Валери Шалва-иҧа Аршба, Russian: Валерий Шалвович Аршба, Georgian: ვალერი არშბა; born 4 October 1949 in Tkvarcheli) was the first Vice President of the Republic of Abkhazia. He was first elected to the office on 5 January 1995, under President Vladislav Ardzinba, and the pair was re-elected in the 1999 Presidential election where they ran unopposed. Arshba initially was a candidate in the October 2004 Abkhazian presidential election, but he withdrew just before the start of the campaign period due to pressure from his family. During the post-election crisis that followed, Arshba supported opposition candidate Sergei Bagapsh, and when the latter eventually became President following a power-sharing agreement with his rival Raul Khajimba and new elections in January 2005, Valery Arshba was made head of the presidential administration of Abkhazia on 15 February 2005.

Political offices
Preceded by None	Vice President of Abkhazia; 5 January 1995–2005	Succeeded by Raul Khadjimba
