= Amra Kvarandzia =

Abkhazian politician

Amra Kvarandzia is the current Minister of Finance of Abkhazia. Kvarandzia was appointed on 17 October 2014 by newly elected President Raul Khajimba.
