= Otar Khetsia =

Abkhazian politician (born 1965)

Minister of Internal Affairs of Abkhazia
- In office 20 October 2011 – 4 August 2014
- President: Alexander Ankvab; Valeri Bganba
- Prime Minister: Leonid Lakerbaia; Vladimir Delba
- Preceded by: Leonid Dzapshba
- Succeeded by: Raul Lolua

Secretary of the Security Council of Abkhazia
- In office 18 August 2010 – 7 December 2011
- President: Sergei Bagapsh
- Preceded by: Aleksandr Voinskiy
- Succeeded by: Stanislav Lakoba

Minister of Internal Affairs of Abkhazia
- In office 25 February 2005 – 12 August 2010
- President: Sergei Bagapsh
- Prime Minister: Alexander Ankvab; Sergei Shamba
- Preceded by: Abesalom Beia
- Succeeded by: Ramin Gablaia

Personal details
- Born: 19 February 1965 (age 61) Gagra, Abkhazian ASSR, Georgian SSR, Soviet Union

Otar Mikhailovich Khetsia (Russian: Отар Михайлович Хеция; born 19 February 1965) has twice been Minister of Internal Affairs of Abkhazia.

== Career ==
Otar Khetsia was first appointed Interior Minister after the election of President Sergei Bagapsh in 2005.

On 12 August 2010, Otar Khetsia was dismissed as Interior Minister and on 18 August, appointed Secretary of the State Security Council. He was temporarily succeeded by his First Deputy Minister Ramin Gablaia until First Deputy Minister of Taxes and Fees Leonid Dzapshba was appointed the new Minister of the Interior on 22 September.

After the election of President Alexander Ankvab following the sudden death of Bagapsh, Khetsia was again appointed as Interior Minister on 20 October 2011.

Following the resignation of Alexander Ankvab as a result of the 2014 Abkhazian Revolution, Khetsia went on paid leave, and on 9 June Raul Lolua, Head of the State Security Service's Special Forces Centre, was appointed First Deputy Minister to carry out his duties. On 4 August, acting President Valeri Bganba dismissed Khetsia and appointed Lolua as Acting Minister.

In the run-up to the 2016 presidential recall referendum, Khetsia co-signed an appeal with Lolua and his predecessor Abesalom Beia to President Raul Khajimba to dismiss then Interior Minister Leonid Dzapshba over a speech he had given to officials at the Ministry that angered opposition activists, who claimed Dzapshba had pressured the officials not to participate in the referendum and threatened them with dismissal. Dzapshba was eventually suspended on 5 July after some opposition activists had stormed the Ministry.
