= Miron Merzhanov =

Soviet Armenian architect (1895–1975)

- Мирон Иванович Мержанов
- Born: 23 September 1895; Nakhichevan-on-Don, Russian Empire
- Died: 13 December 1975 (aged 80); Moscow, RSFSR, Soviet Union
- Education: Saint Petersburg State University of Architecture and Civil Engineering (SPSUACE)
- Occupation: Architect
- Movement: Socialist realism
- Projects: Public buildings in the Black Sea region, Krasnoyarsk and Komsomolsk-on-Amur including Voroshilov Sanatorium and Dzerzhinsky Sanatorium in Sochi, Kuntsevo Dacha.

Miron Ivanovich Merzhanov, born Meran Merzhanyantz (Russian: Мирон Иванович Мержанов, Меран Оганесович Мержанянц, Armenian: Մերուժանյանց Միհրան Հովհաննեսի, September 23, 1895 – December 1975), was a Soviet architect of Armenian descent, notable for being the de facto personal architect of Joseph Stalin in 1933–1941. Arrested in 1942 on political charges, Merzhanov continued professional work as a sharashka architect, designing numerous public buildings in the Black Sea region, Krasnoyarsk and Komsomolsk-na-Amure.

== Biography ==
Meran Merzhanyantz was born to a middle-class Armenian family in Nor Nakhichevan (today the district of Rostov-on-Don). On the eve of World War I he graduated from high school and was admitted to Saint Petersburg Institute of Civil Engineers. Merzhanyantz was eventually drafted into the Russian Army and served in deep rear training units. After the Russian Revolution of 1917 he deserted and returned to Rostov. When faced with mandatory draft into Denikin's front-line troops, he preferred to volunteer with the military engineers, again escaping combat service. With the fall of the White movement, Merzhanyantz relocated to Krasnodar. There, in 1920–1923, he completed engineering training at a local college and married Elizaveta Khodzhaeva, daughter of a successful architect from Kislovodsk.

Throughout the 1920s Merzhanov (using a Russian version of his surname) was active in the Mineralnye Vody area (Essentuki, Kislovodsk, Pyatigorsk). His designs of the 1920s belong to the constructivist architecture school with a neoclassical monumental impact and visual "dematerialization" of load-bearing structures. Merzhanov's trademark details were corner balconies and setbacks breaking through otherwise flat-wall surfaces. Later, he cited Ivan Zholtovsky and Frank Lloyd Wright as his principal sources.

In 1929 Merzhanov won a contest to design a Red Army sanatorium in Sochi, sponsored by the Commissar of Defense Kliment Voroshilov. Voroshilov and Merzhanov became close friends for life, staying in contact after Merzhanov's arrest in 1943 and Voroshilov's forced retirement in 1960. This constructivist project, completed in 1934, and the nearby funicular ramp became an iconic landmark of 1930s Sochi, elevating Merzhanov to the upper tier of Soviet architects. It was followed by two more sanatoriums in Sochi in "grand" style of Stalinist architecture, a Bocharov Ruchey dacha settlement and public buildings in Moscow and Komsomolsk.

In summer of 1933 he was summoned to design a single-story residence in Kuntsevo that became Joseph Stalin's Kuntsevo Dacha (Russian: Ближняя дача) and where the dictator died in 1953. Merzhanov met Stalin in person later, in 1934, when the architect received another commission for a large summer house in Matsesta on the Black Sea. Stalin made a peculiar request - no fountains; Merzhanov, however, squeezed in a natural-looking pool. More dachas for Stalin and top statesmen were built to Merzhanov's design in Gagra and Sochi area in 1935-1937. This time, according to Merzhanov, Stalin did not issue any direct advice, fully relying on the architect. Their relationships remained strictly official, never crossing the line of subordination.

Modest, modernist-but-not-constructivist appearance of Stalin's houses may indicate that the dictator's real personal taste was quite different from the official Stalinist architecture of the period.

According to the biographer Arkady Akulov, Merzhanov co-designed Golden Stars of Hero of Soviet Union and Hero of Socialist Labour, but his version is not corroborated in mainstream historical sources.

Following the German invasion of 1941, Merzhanov was involved in defense projects in and around Moscow, and stayed in the city when the Academy of Architecture evacuated to Chimkent. In August 1942, Merzhanov, his wife and his associates were arrested. On 27 February 1944 he was extrajudicially sentenced for 10 years in labor camps for Anti-Soviet activities. According to the sentence, testimonies against Merzhanov were produced in advance in 1938, and both witnesses were executed in the same year. Merzhanov was lucky enough to be sent to Komsomolsk camps where city authorities, who collaborated with him as a free professional in the 1930s, extricated him from the barracks. For the next five years he headed a construction sharashka. Merzhanov's public building in Komsomolsk follow the Stalinist style of the late 1930s. Meanwhile, his wife perished in the camps and his son, Boris Merzhanov (1929–1983), was arrested in 1948.

In the beginning of 1949, halfway through his jail term, he was summoned to Victor Abakumov, Minister for State Security, and assigned to lead the design and construction of MGB Sanatorium in Sochi. However, Abakumov fell from power in 1951 and Merzhanov was relieved from the half-finished Sochi project. Nevertheless, the palladian Felix Dzerzhinsky Sanatorium, then the largest structure in Sochi, was completed in 1954 to Merzhanov's original plans.

After Stalin's death, Merzhanov ended up in Krasnoyarsk, and headed a local design bureau until 1960 (under city architect Gevorg Kochar, another exiled Armenian). His associate on the Sochi project, Gleb Makarevich, persuaded Merzhanov to continue practice in Moscow. Merzhanov later designed and built two glass office towers in nondescript, Khrushchev-period style. He remained active until a 1971 accident which left him crippled.
