= Sukhumi Cathedral =

Eastern Orthodox church in the city of Sukhumi, the capital of Abkhazia

Coordinates: 43°00′22″N 41°00′52″E

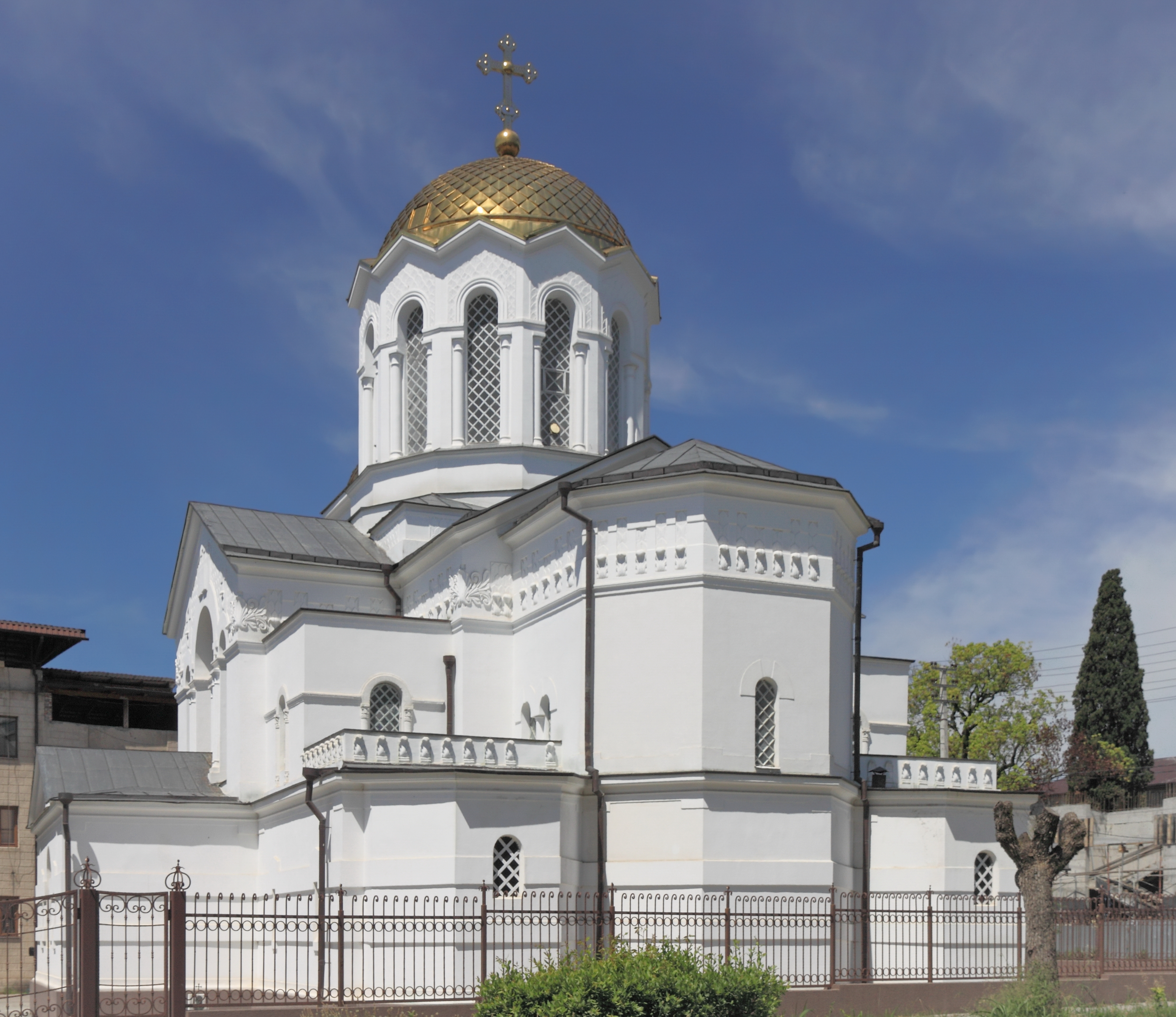
Sukhumi Cathedral as of 2014.

The Sukhumi Cathedral of the Annunciation is an Eastern Orthodox church in the city of Sukhumi, the capital of Abkhazia, an entity in the South Caucasus with a disputed political status.

The cathedral was built in a Neo-Byzantine fashion by Sukhumi's then-vibrant Greek community between 1909 and 1915. It was then consecrated in the name of St. Nicholas and was, therefore, popularly referred to as Greek Nicholas Church. In the 1940s, after the expulsion of most of local Greeks by the Soviet government under Joseph Stalin, the church passed to the Georgian Orthodox Church as a replacement for its former diocesan cathedral church demolished by the Soviet authorities about a decade earlier. It was reconsecrated in the name of Annunciation and remained one of the few functioning churches on the territory of autonomous Abkhazia throughout the Soviet period. In the 1980s, the church was significantly refurbished and its premises expanded under the Georgian Orthodox metropolitan bishop David Chkadua.

As a result of the War in Abkhazia (1992–1993) and expulsion of ethnic Georgian clergy from Abkhazia, the church was left to the guidance of ethnically Abkhaz priest of the Georgian Orthodox Church, Vissarion Apliaa, who made some renovation on the church building with the help of the Russian church authorities in 2011. Apliaa declared severance of ties with the Georgian church and began to style himself as the leader of independent Abkhazian Orthodox Church, although the former remains canonically unrecognized within the Orthodox world and the Abkhaz Orthodox clerical community itself straddles division. In 2011, the de facto Abkhaz government transferred 38 churches, cathedrals and monasteries perpetually into the care of the Abkhazian Orthodox Church. From the point of the Georgian government, the church is part of cultural heritage located in the Russian-occupied territories of Georgia.
