= Almas Japua =

Abkhazian politician (born 1979)

Almas Severianovich Japua (Abkhaz: Алмас Севериан-иԥа Џьапуа, Russian: Алмас Северианович Джапуа; born 1979 in Sukhumi) is a deputy of the People's Assembly of Abkhazia. Japua was by-elected on 31 August 2014 in constituency no. 26 after sitting MP Beslan Butba had been appointed as acting Vice Premier in the aftermath of the 2014 Abkhazian revolution. Japua was nominated by an initiative group on 12 July and formally registered as candidate on 1 August. He defeated his opponent Amiran Kakalia with 889 votes to 848, out of 1761 votes cast. On 1 September, Japua was officially registered as a member of Parliament.

== Political career ==
On 4 September 2015, Japua opened the congress in which the NGO Ainar was transformed into a political party.

As Ainar's only MP, Japua proposed a moratorium on the sale of real estate to foreign citizens for as long as the necessary legal framework was absent, including a cadastre and zoning plans. The sale of real estate to foreign citizens has been prohibited since 1994, but there was a rival bill that proposed to legalise it. On 15 April 2016, neither proposal was accepted at the committee-level, with, in each case, two votes in favour, two votes against and one abstention. The following day, between 18:10 and 18:25, Japua's car was blown up with a bomb. The explosion occurred about a minute after Japua left the car, and a theory being investigated is that the attack was not meant to hurt Japua, but to warn him. During an emergency session of Parliament in the evening of the following Monday, 18 April, Japua proposed to discuss both rival bills there and then, but the deputies decided to delay the matter until the following Thursday. Japua then declared that since he wouldn't be heard in Parliament, he would resign as deputy, and that the moratorium would be defended by its co-initiators. A few hundred people only broke off their protest in front of Parliament after Speaker Valeri Bganba announced that the rival bill proposing the legalisation of the sale of real estate to foreign citizens had been withdrawn. Bganba also declared that for Japua's resignation to be effective, it would have to be submitted to and approved by the other deputies. The following Thursday, 21 April, the moratorium was rejected by deputies, but instead a resolution was adopted to the same effect. The moratorium in its original form was criticised by Bganba as legally vacuous, because Parliament could not restrict its own law-making powers. On 29 April, he stated that Japua had withdrawn his resignation.
