= Konstantin Katsia =

Abkhazian politician

Chairman of the State Committee for State Property and Privatisation
- In office 24 May 2007 – 30 August 2016
- Prime Minister: Alexander Ankvab; Sergei Shamba; Leonid Lakerbaia; Beslan Butba; Artur Mikvabia
- Preceded by: Daur Tarba
- Succeeded by: Vakhtang Pipia

Konstantin Katsia is a former Chairman of the State Committee for State Property Management and Privatisation of Abkhazia.

== Career ==
On 3 April 2007, Daur Tarba, Chairman of the State Committee for Management of State Property and Privatization in the cabinet of Prime Minister Alexander Ankvab, was appointed head of the Ochamchira District. On 24 May, Katsia, who had been Deputy Chairman up until that point, became the new Chairman.

Katsia was re-appointed in the cabinets of Prime Ministers Sergei Shamba (under President Bagapsh), Leonid Lakerbaia (under President Alexander Ankvab), Beslan Butba and Artur Mikvabia (under President Raul Khajimba).

On 30 August 2016 was not re-appointed in the cabinet of Prime Minister Beslan Bartsits.
