= Minister for Internal Affairs of Abkhazia =

The Minister for Internal Affairs (Russian: министр внутренних дел Республики Абхазия) holds a ministerial position in the government of the Republic of Abkhazia. The post existed in the Soviet period within the Council of Ministers of the Abkhaz Autonomous Soviet Socialist Republic, and since then has been occupied by 10 politicians, of whom three have occupied it twice. The current Minister is Aslan Kobakhia.

== History ==
=== Government of President Ardzinba ===
On 2 June 1996, President Ardzinba dismissed Interior Minister Givi Agrba for unsatisfactory work and replaced him with the head of his own security office Almasbei Kchach. On 2 July 2001, Supreme Court Judge Zurab Agumava was appointed Minister of the Interior in the new Cabinet headed by Anri Jergenia. On 1 November, First Vice-Premier Raul Khajimba was released as Head of the State Security Service, a post which up until then he had still occupied. He was succeeded by Agumava, who in turn was again succeeded by Kchach. On 8 May 2003, Abesalom Beia succeeded Almasbei Kchach as interior minister in the new Cabinet headed by Raul Khajimba, while Kchach was (on 6 June) appointed Secretary of the Security Council.

=== Government of President Bagapsh ===
After the election of Sergei Bagapsh as president, he appointed Otar Khetsia as interior minister on 25 February 2005. He was again appointed after Bagapsh's 2009 re-election.

Khetsia was dismissed as Minister of the Interior on 12 August 2010 and appointed Secretary of the State Security Council on 18 August. He was temporarily succeeded by his First Deputy Minister Ramin Gablaia until First Deputy Minister of Taxes and Fees Leonid Dzapshba was appointed the new Minister of the Interior on 22 September.

=== Government of President Ankvab ===
After the election of Alexander Ankvab, he again appointed Otar Khetsia as interior minister on 20 October 2011.

Following the resignation of Alexander Ankvab as a result of the 2014 Abkhazian Revolution, Khetsia went on paid leave, and on 9 June Raul Lolua, Head of the State Security Service's Special Forces Centre, was appointed First Deputy Minister to carry out his duties. On 4 August, acting President Valeri Bganba dismissed Khetsia and appointed Lolua as Acting Minister.

=== Government of President Khajimba ===
After the election of Raul Khajimba, he permanently appointed Raul Lolua on 25 October 2014. Logua was re-appointed in April 2015, following the replacement of Beslan Butba as prime minister by Artur Mikvabia, but handed in his resignation the following month, after two confrontations between police officers and members of the State Security Service. On the evening of 14 May, President Khajimba accepted Logua's resignation and appointed former Prosecutor General of the Gagra District Beslan Khagba as his successor.

On 9 October, Khajimba dismissed Khagba and appointed Leonid Dzapshba, who had already held the post from 2010 to 2011 under President Sergei Bagapsh and who had scored a 3.4% fourth place in the 2014 Presidential election.

In the run-up to the 2016 presidential recall referendum, Dzapshba gave a speech to officials at the Ministry that angered opposition activists, who claimed Dzapshba had pressured the officials not to participate in the referendum. On 5 July, some activists stormed the Ministry and demanded i.a. Dzapshba's resignation. As a concession to the protestors, Khajimba suspended Dzapshba for the duration of an investigation into the matter by the Prosecutor General, and instructed first deputy Minister Boris Abitov to carry out his duties. On 26 July, Prime Minister Artur Mikvabia resigned. On 16 August, MP and former State Customs Committee Chairman under President Vladislav Ardzinba Aslan Kobakhia was appointed Interior Minister (and Vice Premier) instead of Dzapshba, who was appointed presidential advisor on law enforcement agencies.

== List of ministers for internal affairs of Abkhazia ==
| # | Name | Entered office | Left office | President | Comments |
|---|---|---|---|---|---|
| | Platon Arshba | 1953 | 1968 | | |
| | Valeri Khintba | December 1968 | 1973 | | |
| | Givi Lominadze | | 24 June 1992 | | |
| | Alexander Ankvab | 24 June 1992 | 1993 | | |
| | Givi Agrba | 1993 | 26 November 1994 | | |
| | Givi Agrba | 26 November 1994 | 2 June 1996 | Vladislav Ardzinba | |
| | Almasbei Kchach | 2 June 1996 | 2 July 2001 | Vladislav Ardzinba | First time |
| | Zurab Agumava | 2 July 2001 | 1 November 2001 | Vladislav Ardzinba | |
| | Almasbei Kchach | 1 November 2001 | 8 May 2003 | Vladislav Ardzinba | Second time |
| | Abesalom Beia | 8 May 2003 | 25 February 2005 | Vladislav Ardzinba | |
| | Otar Khetsia | 25 February 2005 | 20 August 2010 | Sergei Bagapsh | First time |
| | Ramin Gablaia | 12 August 2010 | 20 September 2010 | Sergei Bagapsh | Acting |
| | Leonid Dzapshba | 22 September 2010 | 29 May 2011 | Sergei Bagapsh | |
| | Leonid Dzapshba | 29 May 2011 | 20 October 2011 | Alexander Ankvab | |
| | Otar Khetsia | 20 October 2011 | 1 June 2014 | Alexander Ankvab | Second time |
| | Otar Khetsia | 1 June 2014 | 4 August 2014 | Valeri Bganba | Second time |
| | Raul Lolua | 4 August 2014 | 15 October 2014 | Valeri Bganba | |
| | Raul Lolua | 15 October 2014 | 14 May 2015 | Raul Khajimba | |
| | Beslan Khagba | 14 May 2015 | 9 October 2015 | Raul Khajimba | |
| | Leonid Dzapshba | 9 October 2015 | 16 August 2016 | Raul Khajimba | Second time |
| | Aslan Kobakhia | 16 August 2016 | Present | Raul Khajimba | |
