= Kholodnaya Rechka =

Kholodnaya Rechka Georgian: ხოლოდნაია რეჩკა Баӷрыԥсҭа (Abkhaz) Bagrypsh
- Village (and municipality)
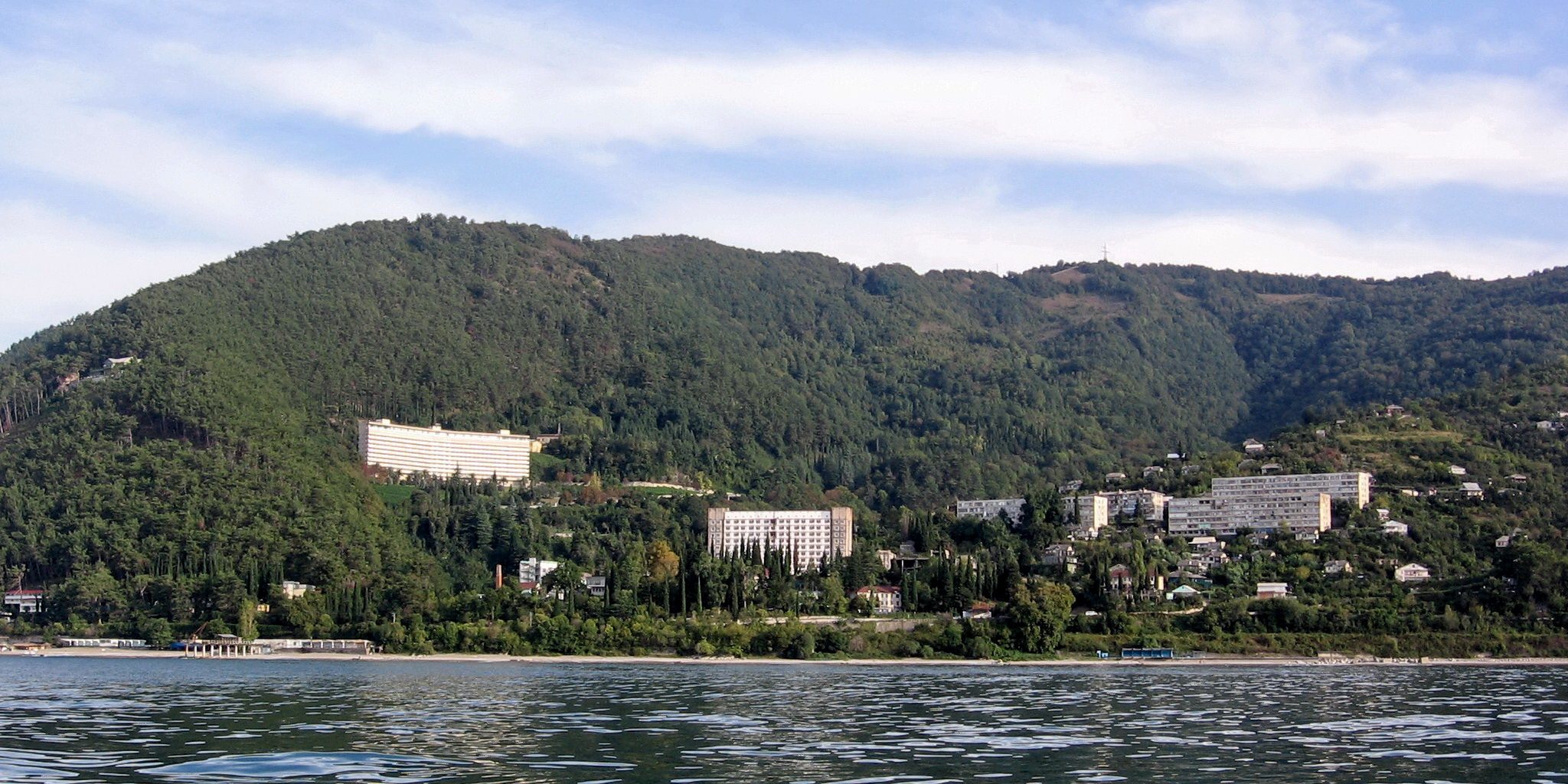
- Kholodnaya Rechka (Baghrypsta)

- Location in Georgia Kholodnaya Rechka (Abkhazia)
- Coordinates: 43°21′19″N 40°07′31″E
- Country: Georgia
- Partially recognized independent country: Abkhazia
- District: Gagra

Government
  - Mayor: Aslan Jopua (Note: "Администрация городов, сёл и посёлков Гагрского района". Gagra District Administration.)
  - Deputy Mayor: Andronik Markaryan
- Time zone: UTC+3 (MSK)
  - Summer (DST): UTC+4

Kholodnaya Rechka (Georgian: ხოლოდნაია რეჩკა; Abkhaz: Баӷрыԥсҭа; Russian: Холодная Речка) is a village in the Gagra District of Abkhazia, (Note: The political status of Abkhazia is disputed. Having unilaterally declared independence from Georgia in 1992, Abkhazia is formally recognised as an independent state by 4 UN member states (three other states previously recognised it but then withdrew their recognition), while the remainder of the international community recognizes it as de jure Georgian territory. Georgia continues to claim the area as its own territory, designating it as Russian-occupied territory.) Georgia.

== See also ==
- Gagra District
