= Mikhail Logua =

4th vice president of the autonomous region of Abkhazia, Georgia

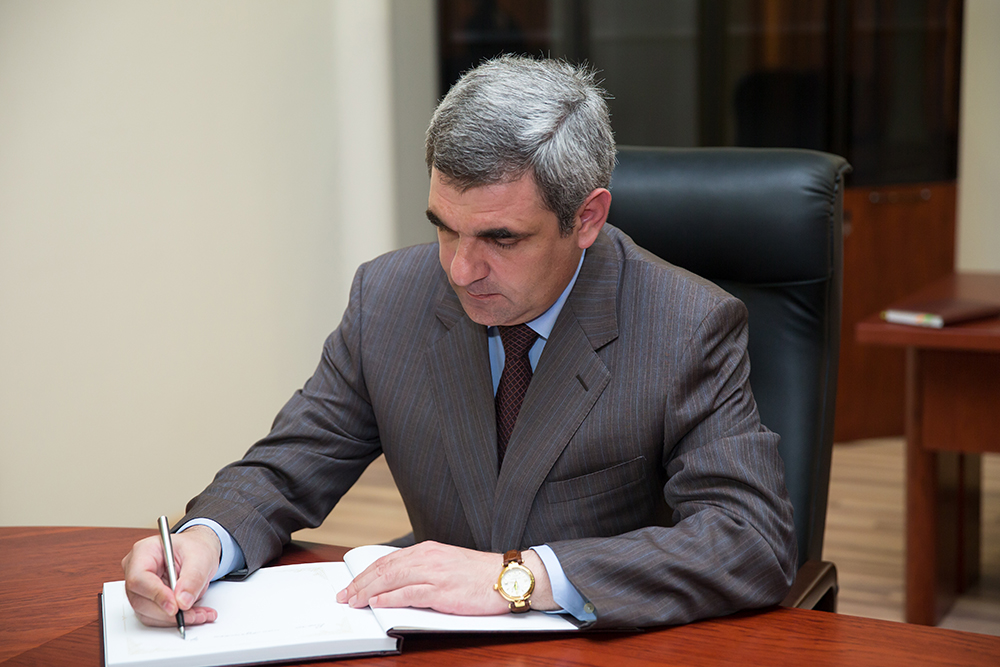
Mikhail Logua Михаил Логуа Mikhail Valerievich Logua - 4th Vice-President of the Republic of Abkhazia.

Vice President of Abkhazia
- In office 26 September 2011 – 25 December 2013
- President: Alexander Ankvab
- Preceded by: Alexander Ankvab
- Succeeded by: Vitali Gabnia

Personal details
- Born: 27 July 1970 (age 55) Sukhumi, Soviet Union

Mikhail Valerievich Logua (Russian: Михаил Валерьевич Логуа born 27 July 1970) is an Abkhaz politician who has been Vice President of Abkhazia from 2011 until 2013. He previously served as Governor of Gulripshi District from 2006 until 2011.

On 23 May 2013, Apsnypress reported that Logua had renounced his membership of the political party United Abkhazia.

On 25 December 2013, Logua announced his resignation as Vice President for health reasons.

Political offices
Preceded by Aslan Baratelia	Governor of Gulripshi District; 2006–2011	Succeeded by Timur Eshba
Preceded by Alexander Ankvab	Vice President of Abkhazia; 2011–2013	Succeeded by Vitali Gabnia
