= Vice President of Abkhazia =

Political position in the de facto independent Republic of Abkhazia

Vice President of the Republic of Abkhazia
- Emblem of Abkhazia
- Incumbent; Beslan Bigvava since 2 April 2025
- Type: Vice to the president
- Status: First in line of succession
- Member of: Cabinet
- Residence: Sukhumi
- Appointer: President
- Term length: 5 years
- Inaugural holder: Valery Arshba
- Formation: 26 November 1994; 31 years ago
- Website: Official website

The vice president of the Abkhaz Republic (Abkhaz: Аԥсны ахада ихаҭыԥуаҩ, Russian: Вице-президент Республики Абхазия), a partially recognized state, internationally regarded as a part of Georgia, is the first in the presidential line of succession, becoming the new president of Abkhazia upon the death, resignation, or removal of the president. Additionally, the vice president would assume the presidency in case the president becomes incapable of carrying out the presidential duties.

== Eligibility ==
According to article 54 of the Constitution of Abkhazia, a citizen of Abkhazia, no younger than 35 years old and no older than 65 years old, who is in possession of suffrage, may be elected vice president. The vice president shall not be member of the Parliament, or hold any other offices in state or public bodies as well as in businesses.

== Election ==
The vice president is elected simultaneously with the president. A candidate for vice president is nominated by a candidate for president.

== Duties ==
The vice president executes individual assignments on a commission of the president and acts for the president in his absence or in case when it is impossible for the president to attend to his duties.

== List of vice presidents of Abkhazia ==
No.	Portrait	Name (Birth–Death)	Term of office			President(s)	Notes
No.	Portrait	Name (Birth–Death)	Took office	Left office	Time in office	President(s)	Notes
1		Valery Arshba (born 1949)	5 January 1995	12 February 2005	10 years, 38 days	Vladislav Ardzinba	
2		Raul Khajimba (born 1958)	14 February 2005	28 May 2009	4 years, 103 days	Sergei Bagapsh	
3		Alexander Ankvab (born 1952)	12 February 2010	29 May 2011	1 year, 106 days	Sergei Bagapsh	
4		Mikhail Logua (born 1970)	26 September 2011	25 December 2013	2 years, 90 days	Alexander Ankvab	
5		Vitali Gabnia (born 1968)	25 September 2014	22 August 2018	3 years, 331 days	Raul Khajimba	
6		Aslan Bartsits	25 September 2019	12 January 2020	109 days	Raul Khajimba	
7		Badra Gunba (born 1981)	23 April 2020	2 April 2025	4 years, 344 days	Aslan Bzhania; Himself	
8		Beslan Bigvava	2 April 2025	Incumbent	1 year, 208 days	Badra Gunba	

== See also ==
- President of Abkhazia
- Prime Minister of Abkhazia
- Minister for Foreign Affairs of Abkhazia
