= Beslan Eshba =

Abkhazian politician (born 1967)

Chairman of Apsadgyl
- In office 16 August 2015 – 6 October 2016
- Succeeded by: Nugzar Logua

Deputy Prime Minister of Abkhazia
- Incumbent
- Assumed office 12 August 2016
- Prime Minister: Beslan Bartsits
- In office 30 April 2013 – 3 June 2014
- Prime Minister: Leonid Lakerbaia
- Preceded by: Vakhtang Pipia

Member of Parliament for Constituency no. 1 (Sukhumi)
- In office 10 May 2012 – 2013
- Preceded by: Talikh Khvatysh
- Succeeded by: Daur Arshba

Personal details
- Born: 23 December 1967 (age 58) Sukhumi, Georgian SSR, Soviet Union
- Party: Apsadgyl

Beslan Eshba is a vice premier of Abkhazia and the head of a sociopolitical organization Apsadgyl (Abkhaz: Апсадгьыл). Prior to his current position, he was a deputy commander in the Sukhumi battalion and an advisor to the President of Abkhazia.

== Early life ==
Beslan was born on 23 December 1967. In 1985 he graduated from the Sukhumi High School. From 1986 to 1988, Eshba served in the armed forces of the USSR. He graduated from the State Institute of Agriculture (Russian: ГИСХ) in 1992 with a specialty in engineering and technology.

Eshba is married with two children.

== Career ==
During the War in Abkhazia (1992–1993), Eshba was a member of the guard service of the supreme organs of the state authority of Abkhazia and its officials. In post-war campaigns, he held the post of deputy commander in the Sukhumi battalion. He was the deputy commander of the 4th Sukhumi Brigade in the Kodori operation of 2008.

President of Abkhazia Vladislav Ardzinba assigned Eshba to head the Renaissance Foundation of Abkhazia in Moscow from 1994 to 1995. His mission was to supply humanitarian aid to the republic.

Eshba headed the state company Abkhaztop from 1998 to 2005, then served as Chairman of the Board of the Universal Bank from 2007 to 2010. Since 2008, Eshba has served as a member of the board of directors of ZAO Aquafon-GSM.

Since 12 February 2018, he has been the head of the sociopolitical organization Apsadgyl.

== Political career ==
Eshba advised the president of Abkhazia on economic issues from February 1996 to February 1999. From August 2010 to September 2011, Eshba was the assistant to the head of the government of the Republic of Abkhazia. He then served as Deputy of the People's Assembly in the Parliament of the Republic of Abkhazia.

Beslan Eshba was elected to the People's Assembly of Abkhazia in the 2012 elections. Eshba had not originally run in the election but stood as a candidate in the rerun election of constituency number one. The rerun was necessitated after the original election was declared invalid because the turnout had failed to surpass the threshold of 25 percent. He defeated four candidates to win the first round with 56.61 percent of the vote (1,932 out of 3,413 votes).

On 30 April 2013, president Alexander Ankvab appointed Eshba vice premier. Following the May 2014 revolution against Ankvab, Eshba resigned on 3 June 2014. Acting president Valeri Bganba accepted his resignation that same day. On 16 June 2014, an initiative group promoted Eshba for president campaign. He was denied registration on 15 July 2014, because, according to the linguistic commission, he was not sufficiently fluent in the official state language. Abkhazian law requires that presidential candidates be tested for proficiency in the state language.

Eshba was elected as the Chairman of Apsadgyl (Апсадгьыл) on 16 August 2015, following its transformation into a sociopolitical organization.

On 12 August 2016, Eshba was once again appointed to the post of Vice Premier after the number of vice premiers in the Government of President Khajimba was increased from one to three. Due to his appointment, Apsadgyl's executive committee replaced him with former Culture Minister Nugzar Logua on 6 October 6, 2016.

Eshba submitted an application to be released from the duties of the vice premier on 23 January 2018.
