= Vladimir Delba =

Abkhazian politician, acting Prime Minister

- Владимир Делба
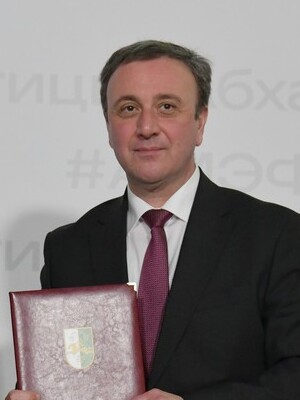
- Delba in 2026

Prime Minister of Abkhazia
- Incumbent
- Assumed office 3 April 2025; Acting: 3 March – 3 April 2025
- President: Badra Gunba
- Preceded by: Valeri Bganba (acting)
- Acting; 2 June 2014 – 29 September 2014
- President: Valeri Bganba (acting)
- Preceded by: Leonid Lakerbaia
- Succeeded by: Beslan Butba

Minister for Finance of Abkhazia
- In office 10 October 2011 – 17 October 2014
- President: Alexander Ankvab; Valeri Bganba (Acting)
- Prime Minister: Leonid Lakerbaia; Himself (Acting)
- Preceded by: Beslan Kubrava
- Succeeded by: Amra Kvarandzia

Personal details
- Born: 26 September 1974 (age 52) Sukhumi, Georgian SSR, Soviet Union
- Party: Independent

Vladimir Valerevich Delba (Russian: Владимир Валерьевич Делба; Abkhaz: Владимир Валери-иԥа Делба, romanized: Vladimir Valeri-ipha Delba; born 27 September 1974) is an Abkhazian politician, who serves as Prime Minister of Abkhazia since 3 April 2025, being first appointed by Badra Gunba as acting prime minister on 3 March 2025. He also served as finance minister and vice premier in the Government of President Ankvab, and a brief stint as prime minister in 2014.

== Political career ==
After serving as deputy minister for finance in the Government of President Bagapsh, Delba was appointed finance minister and vice premier by Alexander Ankvab on 10 October 2011.

On 2 June 2014, following Leonid Lakerbaia's resignation as a result of the 2014 Abkhazian political crisis, Vladimir Delba was appointed acting prime minister. After the Election of President Raul Khajimba, he was succeeded by Beslan Butba on 29 September.

Political offices
Preceded by Leonid Lakerbaia	Prime Minister of Abkhazia; Acting; 2014	Succeeded by Beslan Butba
