= Leonid Dzapshba =

Abkhazian politician

- Леонид Иури-иҧа Ӡаҧшьба

Minister for Internal Affairs
- In office 9 October 2015 – 16 August 2016
- Prime Minister: Artur Mikvabia
- Preceded by: Beslan Khagba
- Succeeded by: Aslan Kobakhia
- In office 22 September 2010 – 20 October 2011
- Prime Minister: Sergei Shamba
- Preceded by: Otar Khetsia
- Succeeded by: Otar Khetsia

Personal details
- Born: 1 January 1961 (age 65) Barmysh, Soviet Union
- Party: Independent
- Website: Official website

Leonid Yurivich Dzapshba (Abkhaz: Леонид Иури-иҧа Ӡаҧшьба; born January 1, 1961) is a two-time Minister for Internal Affairs of Abkhazia, a former Presidential candidate and the former head of the Football Federation of Abkhazia.

== Early life ==
Dzapshba was born on 1 January 1961 in the village of Barmysh, Gudauta District. He attended high school in Bambora and graduated in 1975. From 1979 until 1981, Dzapshba served in the Soviet Army. He then studied at the police school in Cheboksary until 1993, when he entered the police department in Tomsk, serving in different positions until 1991.

== Career in Abkhazia ==
In 1991, Dzapshba returned to Abkhazia. Between 1991 and October 1993, Dzapshba held various positions within the Interior Ministry. In October 1993, he became Deputy Minister. On 10 July 1996, Dzapshba was appointed Deputy Head of Abkhazia's Security Service. In 2002, he was appointed First Deputy Minister for Taxes and Levies. In 2007, Dzapshba additionally became President of the Abkhazian Football Federation.

On 12 August 2010, Otar Khetsia was dismissed as Minister for Internal Affairs of Abkhazia and subsequently (on 18 August) appointed Secretary of the State Security Council. Khetsia was temporarily succeeded by First Deputy Minister Ramin Gablaia, until on 22 September Leonid Dzapshba was made the new Interior Minister.

On 20 October 2011, after Alexander Ankvab became President following the sudden death of Sergei Bagapsh, he once again replaced Dzapshba as Interior Minister by Othar Khetsia.

== Indictment for corruption ==
On 25 June 2012, Dzapshba was indicted for the embezzlement of 7,832,368 rubles while he was head of the Abkhazian Football Federation. On 3 July, Dzapshba defended himself in an interview with the newspaper Nuzhnaya. In reply, the Prosecutor General's office released a statement on 9 July. It alleged that Dzapshba had abused funds to buy cars for himself and for family, and to travel to Russia and Europe, supposedly to meet FIFA President Sepp Blatter and UEFA President Michel Platini. On 12 July, Dzapsha held a press conference, supported by Sergei Shamba, who had been Prime Minister at the time of the supposed acts of malpractice. Dzapshba denied the accusations of the Prosecutor's Office, stating that he had in fact met Blatter and Platini, as evidenced by a letter of thanks written by President Bagapsh. In addition, Dzapshba asserted that the 7 million ruble deficit had arisen in the construction of football pitches, and that he had received permission from President Bagapsh to cover the shortfall with government funds, but that this was thwarted by Bagapsh's death. On the same day, a group of relatives of Dzapshba also sent an open letter addressed to President Ankvab.

== 2014 Presidential election ==
Dzapshba unsuccessfully participated in the 2014 Presidential election with running mate Boris Abitov, scoring a 3.4% fourth place. The pair had been nominated by an initiative group on 27 June.

Dzapshba's campaign manager was former Chairman of the State Committee for Youth Affairs and Sports Rafael Ampar. His candidate for the post of Prime Minister was former Foreign Affairs Minister Maxim Gvinjia.

== Interior Minister (second time, 2015–2016) ==
On 9 October 2015, President Raul Khajimba dismissed Interior Minister Khagba, and appointed Dzapshba to the post again.

In the run-up to the 2016 presidential recall referendum, Dzapshba gave a speech to officials at the Ministry that angered opposition activists, who claimed Dzapshba had pressured the officials not to participate in the referendum and threatened them with dismissal. On 20 June, three of Dzapshba's predecessors as Interior Minister, Abesalom Beia, Otar Khetsia and Raul Lolua, called upon President Khajimba to dismiss him. On 5 July, some opposition activists stormed the Ministry and demanded i.a. Dzapshba's resignation. As a concession to the protestors, Khajimba suspended Dzapshba for the duration of an investigation into the matter by the Prosecutor General. On 26 July, Prime Minister Artur Mikvabia resigned. On 16 August, MP and former State Customs Committee Chairman under President Vladislav Ardzinba Aslan Kobakhia was appointed Interior Minister (and Vice Premier) instead of Dzapshba, while Dzapshba was appointed presidential advisor on law enforcement agencies.

Political offices
Preceded by Otar Khetsia	Minister for Internal Affairs; 2010–2011	Succeeded by Otar Khetsia
Preceded by Beslan Khagba	Minister for Internal Affairs; 2015–2016	Succeeded by Aslan Kobakhia
