= 2016 Abkhazian early presidential elections referendum =

- 10 July 2016
- Do you consider it necessary to hold early presidential elections in the Republic of Abkhazia?

Results
Choice	Votes	%
Yes	750	49.64%
No	761	50.36%
Valid votes	1,511	92.81%
Invalid or blank votes	117	7.19%
Total votes	1,628	100.00%
Registered voters/turnout	132,887	1.23%

A referendum on holding early presidential elections was held in Abkhazia on 10 July 2016. The referendum was declared invalid due to low turnout (1.23%), after both sides decided to boycott it.

== Background ==
A petition calling for a referendum was started by an initiative group in March 2016, who were required to obtain 10,000 signatures. On 22 April, the initiative group handed over the petition to the Central Election Commission with 19,314 signatures, stating that it had collected 21,226 signatures but had omitted those that were invalid because the information of the signatory was incomplete. The referendum was approved by a decree signed by President Raul Khajimba on 1 June. On 28 June, CEC Chairman Batal Tabagua announced that there would be no polling stations outside Abkhazia.

== Interior Ministry crisis ==
In the run-up to the referendum, Interior Minister Leonid Dzapshba gave a speech to officials at the Ministry that angered opposition activists, who claimed Dzapshba had pressured the officials not to participate in the referendum and threatened them with dismissal. On 20 June, three of Dzapshba's predecessors as Interior Minister, Abesalom Beia, Otar Khetsia and Raul Lolua, called upon President Khajimba to dismiss him. On 5 July, some opposition activists stormed the Ministry and demanded i.a. Dzapshba's resignation. As a concession to the protestors, Khajimba suspended Dzapshba for the duration of an investigation into the matter by the Prosecutor General.

== Results ==
The referendum was declared invalid due to low turnout (1.23%) as it was boycotted by both the government and the opposition. Of those who voted, a majority was against holding an early election.

Do you consider it necessary to hold early election of President of the Republic of Abkhazia?

Choice	Votes	%
For	750	49.64
Against	761	50.36
Invalid/blank votes	117	–
Total	1,628	100
Registered voters/turnout	132,887	1.23
Source: TASS
