= List of monuments in Gudauta Municipality =

The Monuments in the Gudauta Municipality is a group of cultural heritage sites registered by the government of Georgia on the territory of a de jure territorial unit, which corresponds to the Gudauta District in Abkhazia. (Note: The political status of Abkhazia is disputed. Having unilaterally declared independence from Georgia in 1992, Abkhazia is formally recognised as an independent state by 5 UN member states (two other states previously recognised it but then withdrew their recognition), while the remainder of the international community recognizes it as de jure Georgian territory. Georgia continues to claim the area as its own territory, designating it as Russian-occupied territory.)

The table lists a monument, its location and dating as well as the status attached to it by the Georgian authorities and the number assigned in the registry by the National Agency for Cultural Heritage Preservation of Georgia, which is available online as a GIS portal. The Agency broadly classifies the heritage sites into three groups: 1) the objects without a status, 2) immovable monuments of cultural heritage, and 3) immovable monuments of national significance.

Object	National Registry number	Date of construction	Location	Status	Image
Aatsi Church		1849	Aatsi		
Abgharkhuqi Architectural Complex	3553	8th–9th centuries	Abgharqukhi	Cultural Monument	
Abgharkhuqi Fortress	3552	Middle Ages	Abgharqukhi	Cultural Monument	
Ailaga-Abiqu church		8th–9th centuries	Bambora		
Ambara church		7th–8th centuries	Miusera		
Anacopia Fortress	3551	14th–15th centuries	Akhali Atoni	Cultural Monument of National Significance	
Anukhva church		11th century	Anukhva		
Achandara Dolmens	3557	2nd millennium BC	Achandara	Cultural Monument of National Significance	
Achandara St. George Church		20th century	Achandara		
New Athos Monastery		9th–10th centuries, 1884–1896	Akhali Atoni	Cultural Monument of National Significance	
Akhali Atoni Fortress		Middle Ages	Akhali Atoni		
Akhutsi Church		Late Middle Ages	Kaldakhvara	Cultural Monument	
Bambora Church	3558	Middle Ages	Bambora	Cultural Monument	
Duripshi Fortress	3560	Middle Ages	Duripshi	Cultural Monument	
Gudauta Mother of God Church		1847	Gudauta	Cultural Monument	
Iveria Mountain Church	3551	8th–11th centuries	Akhali Atoni	Cultural Monument of National Significance	
Jirkhva Church		19th century	Jirkhva		
Kaldakhvara Architectural Complex	3564		Kaldakhvara	Cultural Monument of National Significance	
Kaldakhvara Stele, with Arabian text	3562	Middle Ages	Kaldakhvara		
Kaldakhvara Fortress	3563	Middle Ages	Kaldakhvara, Valley of River Bzyb	Cultural Monument	
Likhni Church Aba-Ata	3565	Middle Ages	Likhni	Cultural Monument	
Likhni Church	3566	10th Century, 19th Century	Likhni	Cultural Monument of National Significance	
Msygkhua church		8th–11th centuries	Primorskoe		
Mugudzirkhva Church		Middle Ages	Mugudzirkhva		
Otkhara Dolmens	3567		Otkhara	Cultural Monument	
Otkhara Fortress	3568	Middle Ages	Otkhara	Cultural Monument	
Psirtskha Domed Church	3569	10th–11th Century	Psirtskha	Cultural Monument	
Psirtskha Fortress		Middle Ages	Psirtskha		
Psirtskha Simon the Canaean Basilica		10th–11th Century	Psirtskha		
Qulanurkhva Church	3570	Late Middle Ages	Achandara	Cultural Monument	
Samato Mountain Church		11th Century	Samato		
Shervashidze Palace	3566	10th–11th Century	Likhni	Cultural Monument of National Significance	
Church of St. Simon the Canaanite, New Athos	3548	7th–8th centuries	Akhali Atoni, Iveria Mountain		
Trakea Fortress		6th century	Akhali Atoni		
Vesyolovka Church Remains		Middle Ages	Vesyolovka		
Khopi Saint Nicholas Church	3571	10th century	Khopi	Cultural Monument	
Zvandripshi Church	3561	Middle Ages	Zvandripshi	Cultural Monument	

== See also ==
- List of Cultural Heritage Monuments of Georgia
