= Epigraphy of Abkhazia =

Epigraphy of Abkhazia comprises all the epigraphic monuments (inscriptions written on hard material) inside Abkhazia, Georgia. They are all in Georgian, Greek, Ottoman and Latin languages. The number of the Georgian epigraphic monuments is more than 100 and they date from the 8th century AD. The Greek inscriptions are up to 22 and they mostly date before the 9th century AD. Out of the Ottoman Turkish inscriptions, the oldest one is from 1598. Out of the Georgian inscriptions up to 15 ones mention the kings of Abkhazia. About 30 inscriptions are seen on icons from Bedia, Bichvinta, Tsebelda and Ilori churches.

According to their exterior sign known Georgian inscriptions can be divided into three groups: lapidary (about 50), mural (about 30) and embossed inscriptions (about 20).

== List of the epigraphic monuments of Abkhazia ==
=== Georgian inscriptions ===
Type	Description	Inscription site	Location	Date	Image
Lapidary		Ruined church	Samato Hill, Gudauta Municipality	11th c.	
Lapidary		Khopi Saint Nicholas Church	Khopi, Gudauta Municipality	1156–1178	
Lapidary	multiple	Ruined church of Msygkhua	Msigkhua Hill near Primorskoe, Gudauta Mun.	9th c.	
Mural		Lykhny Church	Lykhny, Gudauta Municipality		
Lapidary	mentions archangels Michael and Gabriel	table in Anukhva Archangels church	Anukhva, Gudauta Municipality	12th c.	
Lapidary	mentions Giorgi Basilisdze	column in Anukhva Archangels church	Anukhva	11th c.	
Lapidary	mentions five saints	Anukhva Archangels church	Anukhva	11th c.	
Embossed	excavated by colonel Tsilosani in 1885–86	Iron and copped objects	Kelasuri right bank, Sokhumi Municipality		
Lapidary	mentions king Bagrat	Besleti Bridge	Besleti, Sokhumi Municipality	11th c. – 12th c.	
Lapidary	"st. Theodore, have mercy on Michael"	Chapel iconostasis	Oktomberi (Olginskoe), Tsebelda district, Gulripshi Municipality	11th c.	
Embossed	asks for mercy on Mariam	St. Catherine icon	Achandara (Poltavskoe), Tsebelda district, Gulripshi Municipality		
	mentions Abulasan Iobisdze	metal slab or an icon inside a chapel	Achandara (Poltavskoe), Tsebelda district, Gulripshi Municipality	13th c.	
Embossed	Dedicated to st. George	metal slab	Kavakluk valley, Tsebelda, Gulripshi	13th c. – 14th c.	
Lapidary		tombstone	Kavakluk valley, Tsebelda, Gulripshi	13th c. – 14th c.	
Lapidary	mentions Luka Martineva	stone plate	Tsebelda	14th c. or 12th. c.	
		St. George church	Tsebelda	12th c. – 13th c.	
Lapidary	mentions Ozbeg Dadiani	Chlou church	Chlou, Ochamchire municipality	1445–1452	
Lapidary	mentions Grigol Guzanisdze bishop of Mokvi	Mokvi Cathedral	Mokvi, Ochamchire municipality	12th c.	
Lapidary	mentions Raba and Nugamtsira	Gudava church	Gudava, Gali Municipality	15th c.	
Lapidary	"Gregory, the chief mason" (გრიგოლ გალატოზთუხუცესი)	Dikhazurga Saint Barbara Church	Dikhazurga, Gali district	11th c.	

=== Greek inscriptions ===
Type	Description	Inscription site	Location	Date	Image
Bronze	A treaty or a honorific decree. The inscription survived in small fragments.	The remains of the largest building uncovered at Eshera (possibly the civic centre of Dioscurias)	Found in Eshera	4th c. BC	
Lapidary	Portraits of "three members of the elite of the Abasgi (?)" and their names: Ninas, Varnokhes, and Thyezanes.		Found near Sukhumi	Probably 2nd c. AD	
Lapidary			Nikopsis fortress (New Athos)	10th c.	
Lapidary			Nikopsis fortress (New Athos)	11th c.	

=== Other inscriptions ===
Type	Description	Inscription site	Location	Date	Image
Lapidary	A Latin inscription containing letters LEG, possibly a building-inscription. The presence of the names of Hadrian and Arrian is not certain.	Found during the excavations of the Roman fort in Sukhumi	Found in Sukhumi, now lost.		

== Map of the Georgian Lapidary ==
Epigraphy of Abkhazia (Abkhazia)
