= Circassian–Georgian wars =

Series of wars

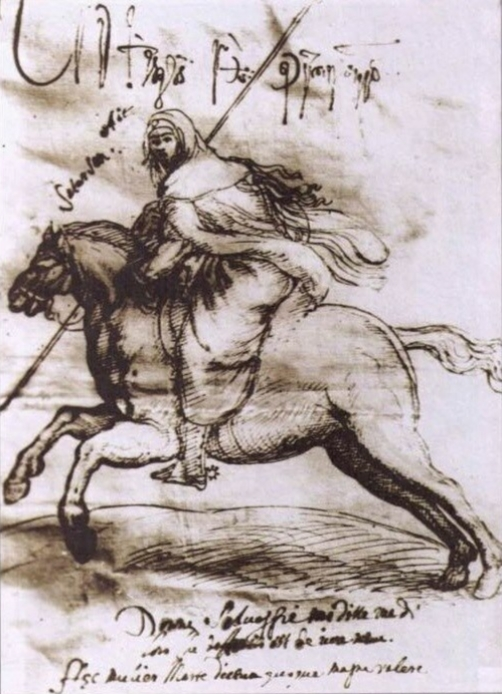
- Illustration of a Circassian cavalryman in Imeretian army by Teramo Castelli
Date	13th century–1864
Location	Caucasus (mainly Circassia and Georgia)
Result	Inconclusive: Destruction of many settlements on both sides; Eventual incorporation of both states into Russia

Belligerents
Circassian state and tribes: Circassia; Zichia; Kabardia; Idarey; Jilakhstaney; Talostaney; Ubykhs; Abazins; Kuban Circassians; Supported by: Lezgins	Georgian states: Kingdom of Georgia; Principality of Mingrelia; Principality of Guria; Kingdom of Kartli; Kingdom of Kakheti; Kingdom of Imereti; Supported by: Chechen-Ingush societies (Note: In Daryal war and Ambush in Darial Gorge)

Commanders and leaders
(Circassia) Inal the Great (Circassia) Inal Dafita; Tsandia Inal-Ipa; Temruqo the Brave; Sholokh the Mighty; Aytech Qanshau; Ivak Tepsaruqo; Mudar Alkhas	(Kingdom of Georgia) Tamar of Georgia (Kingdom of Georgia) Bagrat V of Georgia (Kingdom of Georgia) Alexander I of Georgia (Kingdom of Georgia) Vameq I Dadiani (Kingdom of Georgia) Mamia II Dadiani †; Levan I Dadiani; Levan II Dadiani ‡‡ Levan III Dadiani; David Dadiani; Mamia III Dadiani †; Mamia I Gurieli (POW); Giorgi Gurieli †; Nugzar I of Aragvi; Bagrat III of Imereti; Alexander II of Imereti; Simon I of Kartli; David XI; Luarsab II of Kartli (POW) (Kingdom of Kakheti) Alexander II of Kakheti (Kingdom of Kakheti) Teimuraz I

The Circassian–Georgian wars were a series of intermittent military conflicts, raids, and uprisings between the Georgian kingdoms and principalities and various Circassian (Adyghe) tribes of the North Caucasus, spanning from the late Middle Ages into the early modern period. These confrontations were closely linked to Georgian political fragmentation, Circassian territorial expansion, and the shifting balance of power across the Caucasus.

Following the death of King Alexander I of Georgia in the early 15th century and the subsequent division of the Georgian kingdom among his sons, several subjugated North Caucasian groups revolted against Georgian authority. In this context, Circassian tribes succeeded in throwing off Georgian control and expanded southward into contested frontier regions. Warfare during this period frequently took the form of border clashes, punitive expeditions, and slave-raiding campaigns rather than sustained large-scale wars.

By the 17th and early 18th centuries, Circassian raids into western and central Georgia—often conducted in cooperation with neighboring North Caucasian groups such as the Lezgins—were noted by contemporary observers. These conflicts formed part of the broader Caucasian struggle involving Georgian polities, North Caucasian societies, and neighboring empires, particularly the Ottoman and Safavid states.

== History ==
The Circassians had kept their independence until the early years of the 13th century, when part of their country and Abkhazia were subjected by the Georgians under Tamar of Georgia and re-Christianized in part. This process formed part of a broader phase of Georgian political and cultural domination, which at its height extended over much of the Caucasus. Georgian historians referred to Circassia as "Djiketia" (a variation of "Zichia", the medieval name of Western Circassia). During this period, churches were constructed in various parts of Circassia, the remains of which can still be found scattered across the region. At the same time, important and mutually enriching cultural exchanges took place between the Circassians and Georgians, helping to cement cultural connections that, according to some scholars, persisted long after the end of direct Georgian influence.

Toward the end of the 14th century, the Circassians rebelled against Georgian rule. Around 1390, during the reign of King Bagrat V, the Georgians organized a punitive campaign against Zichia. According to information preserved in the Khobi Monastery records, Vameq I Dadiani led an invasion into Zichia, which was described as "unfaithful" and disloyal to the Georgian state. Vameq defeated the Zichians at the fortress of Gagra and at Ugagi, the latter described as strong and inaccessible, and then ravaged Zichia as far as the Sea of Azov. During this campaign, hostages were taken from those Zichians who submitted, while the lands of those considered rebellious were devastated. Vameq also attacked Zichia from the sea, significantly weakening Zichian naval piracy, although he was ultimately unable to halt the continued expansion of Circassian tribes.

In 1414, the Eristavi of Odishi, Mamia II Dadiani, sought to subjugate the Abkhazians and mobilized an army for this purpose. Circassian king Inal the Great intervened in support of the princes of the House of Sharvashidze against the Georgians. During the ensuing campaign, the Mingrelian army was destroyed and Mamia was killed, while the few survivors retreated back to Odishi. Thus, with the assistance of Inal, the Abkhazian princes succeeded in defeating the Georgian forces.

However, Alexander I of Georgia later arrived in the region with a large army composed of Mingrelians and other Kartvelian contingents. At that time, Inal was engaged in a conflict with the Genoese and was therefore unable to defend Abkhazia. As a result, Prince Chachba was compelled to renew his submission to Georgia. Meanwhile, a group of feudal lords in southern Circassia, led by Prince Ozdemir, rose in rebellion against the authority of Prince Inal. This uprising primarily benefited the western Georgian rulers, who sought to forestall what they feared would be Inal's inevitable and potentially dangerous campaign against Abkhazia.

According to Abzakh legends, Wozdemir was an Abazin who had settled in the Khamyshi tract. Prince Inal advanced against the rebels with his main forces. Wozdemir's troops were defeated, after which he fled into the interior of Abkhazia. During subsequent military operations in Abkhazia, the rebels were completely routed and Wozdemir himself was killed. Inal, relying on alliances with the Anchabadze and Sharvashidze families, succeeded in subjugating the rebellious rulers. According to R. Trakho, the war lasted from 1433 to 1434, and as a result, Prince Inal's influence in Abkhazia was formally recognized.

With the further continuation of Circassian expansion in the North Caucasus, after the death of King Alexander I of Georgia and the subsequent division of his domains among his sons, the political situation within the Georgian kingdom became weakened and unstable. In these conditions of internal fragmentation and loss of central authority, the previously subjugated North Caucasian peoples of the kingdom rose in revolt against Georgian rule. As a consequence of this uprising, the Circassians were able to throw off the Georgian yoke and free themselves from external domination, effectively ending the period of Georgian control over their lands and restoring their independence in the region. Between 1451 and 1455, the Abazins continued to plunder the Mingrelia region.

In 1509, the Circassians carried out a major raid into the region of Mingrelia (Samegrelo), which at the time was under the authority of the Kingdom of Imereti. According to the Georgian chronicle cited by Brosset, this campaign was led by the Circassian military leader Tsandiya Inal Dafita, known by the epithet "The Hated." During the invasion, Inal Dafita advanced into Imereti, killing many of those who resisted and taking a large number of captives. These captives were later ransomed by the Patriarch of Abkhazia.

Circassian incursions into Mingrelia did not end with this campaign and continued during the years 1510–1512. Contemporary Georgian sources report that many inhabitants of the region were captured during these raids, enslaved, and subsequently sold in the markets of the Crimean Khanate.

In response to these repeated attacks and in an attempt to exact revenge and halt further Circassian raids, the Georgian polities of the Principality of Guria and the Principality of Mingrelia organized a joint naval expedition against Zichia. The allied Mingrelian and Gurian forces landed on the Circassian coast on 30 January 1533. In the initial engagement, despite determined resistance by the Zygii, the allies achieved a victory. However, on the following day, many Mingrelian nobles—exhausted by battle—abandoned their lord, reportedly at the instigation of Tsandia Inal-Ipa, who is identified in some sources as an Abkhaz. As a result, the allied forces were decisively defeated. Mamia Dadiani was captured, disarmed, stripped naked, and killed, while Mamia Gurieli was taken prisoner. Malachia I Abashidze, Catholicos of Imereti and Abkhazia, later traveled to the land of the Zygii, where he ransomed the surviving captives and recovered the bodies of those who had been killed in the campaign.

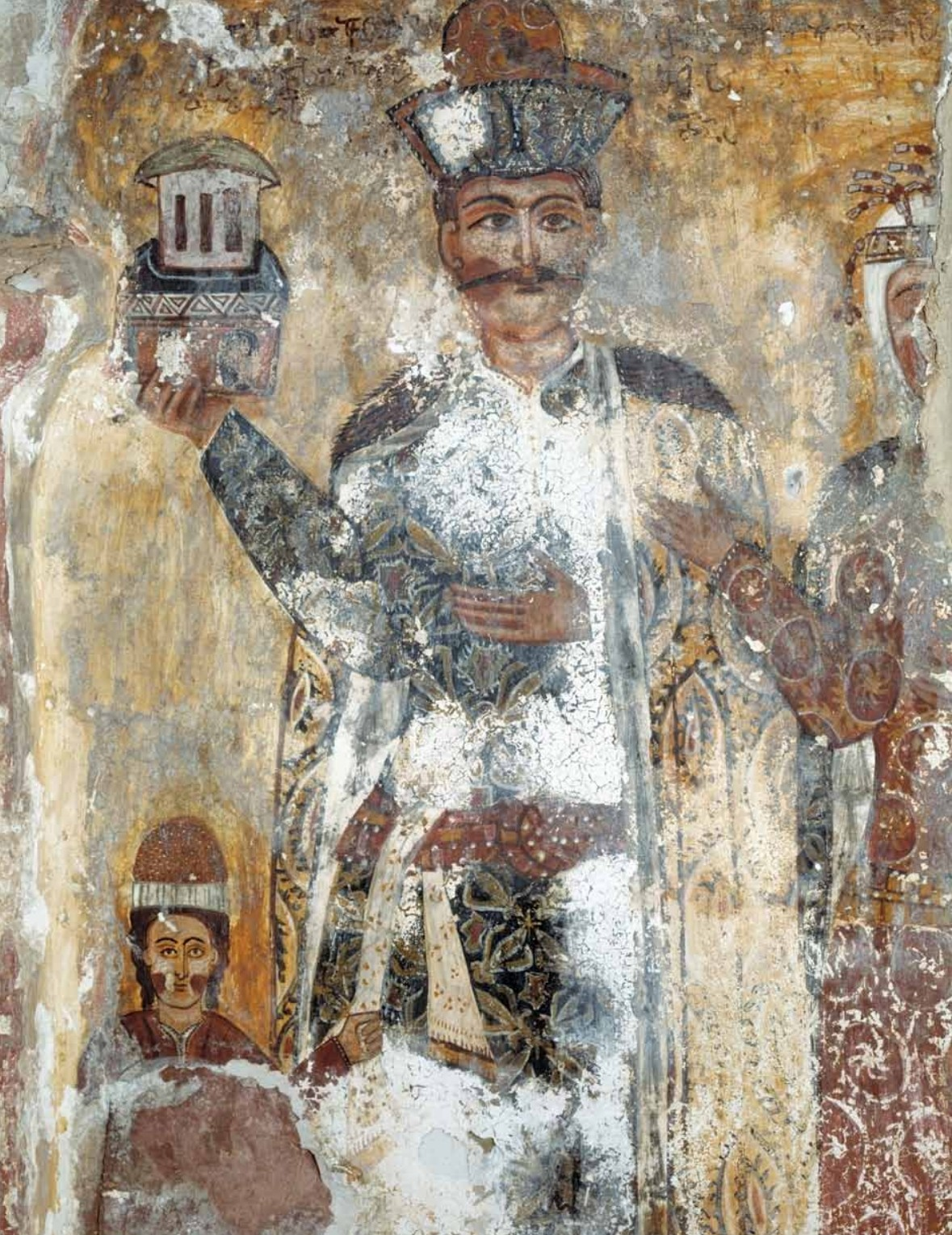
Levan I Dadiani in a fresco in the Tsalenjikha Cathedral.

After the death of Mamia III Dadiani, the ruler of Odishi, power passed to Levan I Dadiani. The new ruler of Odishi soon launched a prolonged naval war against Zichia, a conflict that lasted for approximately three decades. This struggle placed considerable strain on Mingrelia's resources, and Levan I Dadiani ultimately found himself in need of external assistance against the Zichians.

As a result, in 1557 Levan I Dadiani personally sailed from Samegrelo to Constantinople in order to request Ottoman support in his war against the Jiks (Circassians). The Ottoman Sultan did not refuse the appeal of the prince of Odishi and agreed to provide assistance, promising naval support in the form of ships. In a report dated March 1, 1557, Antal Veranchic describes Levan's arrival and intentions as follows:

We already have accurate information about the arrival of the Samegrelo prince. He came by sea... He himself came as an ambassador, although he did so in order to take revenge on the neighboring Circassians, because they killed his father... He is sure that without a navy he could do nothing against the enemy. He brought the Sultan a cup set with precious stones as a gift, in order to ask him for rowing boats. In case of fulfilling this request, the king even assumed a tax, from which he had been free until now. According to the opinion spread here, as a result of the Turkish fleet going to sea, the Samegrelo prince will not immediately receive the boats he requested. The thing is that the Sultan needs this fleet to achieve his much more important goals. It is possible that he gave the Samegrelo prince small boats, which are quite good for military and naval use.

With the assistance he received from the Ottoman Sultan against the Dzhiks, Levan I Dadiani resumed the naval war. However, the extent and nature of Ottoman aid soon proved disappointing. In 1560, the Venetian diplomat Marino Cavalli reported that although the Mingrelian Orthodox Christians were close to the Ottomans and formally subject to them, they attempted to act independently whenever possible. According to Cavalli, four or five years earlier their ruler, Dadiani, had personally traveled to Constantinople after bloody wars with the Circassians to request help from the Sultan and had received six boats. Yet this assistance came at a significant political cost. Ottoman support made it increasingly clear to Levan I Dadiani that he was becoming more dependent on the Sultan and risked turning into little more than an Ottoman client. This dependency, in his view, proved more burdensome than the ongoing struggle against the Circassians themselves. Consequently, the following year he expressed gratitude to the Sultan for the aid already provided but chose to conclude peace with the Circassians, whom he considered more just in their dealings than the Ottomans. This decision effectively brought the long-standing naval war with the Jiks to an end. The conflict with the Jiks, or Circassians, nevertheless produced certain results favorable to Georgia. After the conclusion of peace, pirate attacks from the northeastern Black Sea coast against the Georgian shoreline decreased significantly.

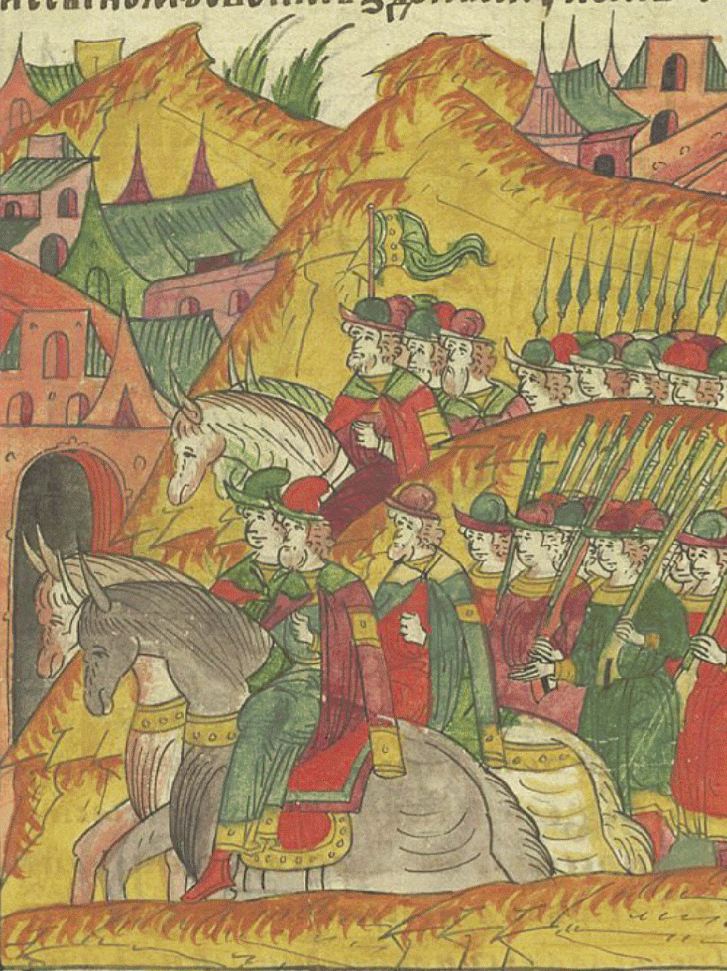
Grigory Semenovich Pleshcheev (on the white horse in the top row) together with Temruqo Idar (on the black horse in the bottom row)

In 1562, the Nikon Chronicle reports a campaign directed against the peoples referred to as the "Mshan" and the "Son" in the Central Caucasus, carried out by the prince of Kabardia, Temruqo the Brave. According to modern historians, the so-called "Son" people are to be identified with the Svans, who are still referred to as "sone" in the Kabardian language. During this campaign, Russian forces under the command of Grigory Pleshcheyev provided military assistance, consisting of an army of approximately 1,000 Streltsy and Cossacks. As a result of the campaign, which lasted for eleven days, a total of 164 settlements were destroyed.

Following the defeat of the Qeytuqo Kabardians by Temruqo Idar, their lands in the Darial Gorge were seized by Prince Alkhas from the clan of Djilakhstan. Between 1584 and 1604, Alkhas, together with the princes Solokh (Sholokh Tepsaruqo), Aitek Murza, Ivak Murza, and others, repeatedly launched raids into Svan territory, devastating large areas and inflicting considerable damage on the local population. The Russian serviceman Rodion Birkin reported one such attack in 1587 in the following terms:

"This day, sir, in the summer, Solokhov's brother, Ivak Murza, came to the Son land to wage war against the Circassians, and they waged war on a village in the Ukrainian region and captured black (peasant) people."

In 1597, Kabardian forces also attacked the Kingdom of Kakheti, which at the time was ruled by Alexander II of Kakheti. The raids targeted the regions of Sioni and Ksani, while at the same time raids against the Svans continued, resulting in the killing of many inhabitants and the capture of others. Alexander II later reported these events to Moscow.

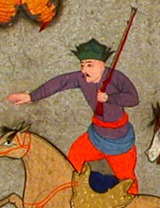
A Circassian soldier in Osman Pasha's army.

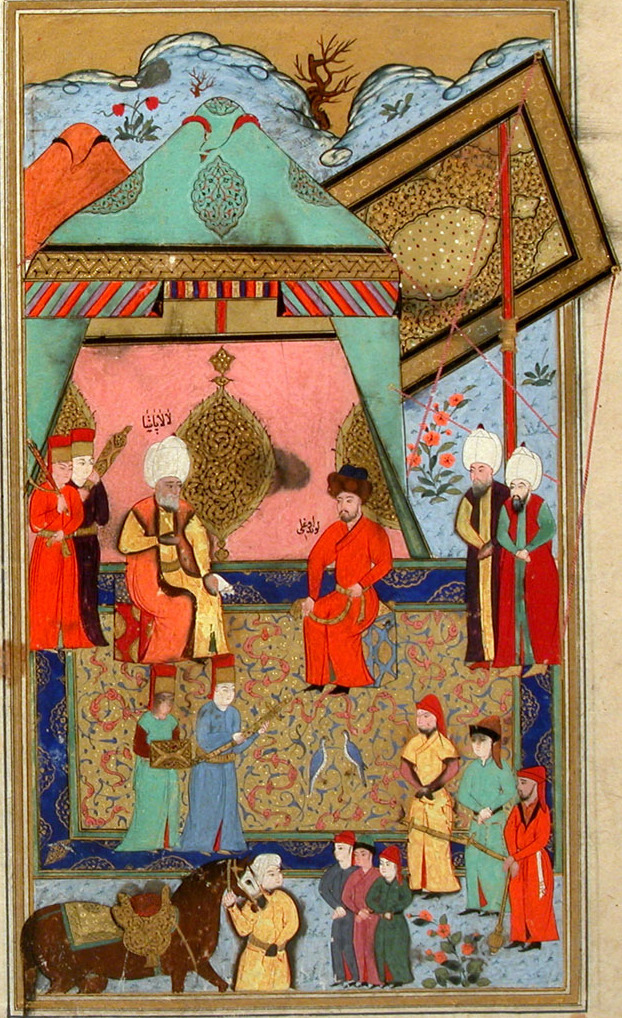
Alexander II of Kakheti together with Lala Mustafa Pasha after the capture of the city

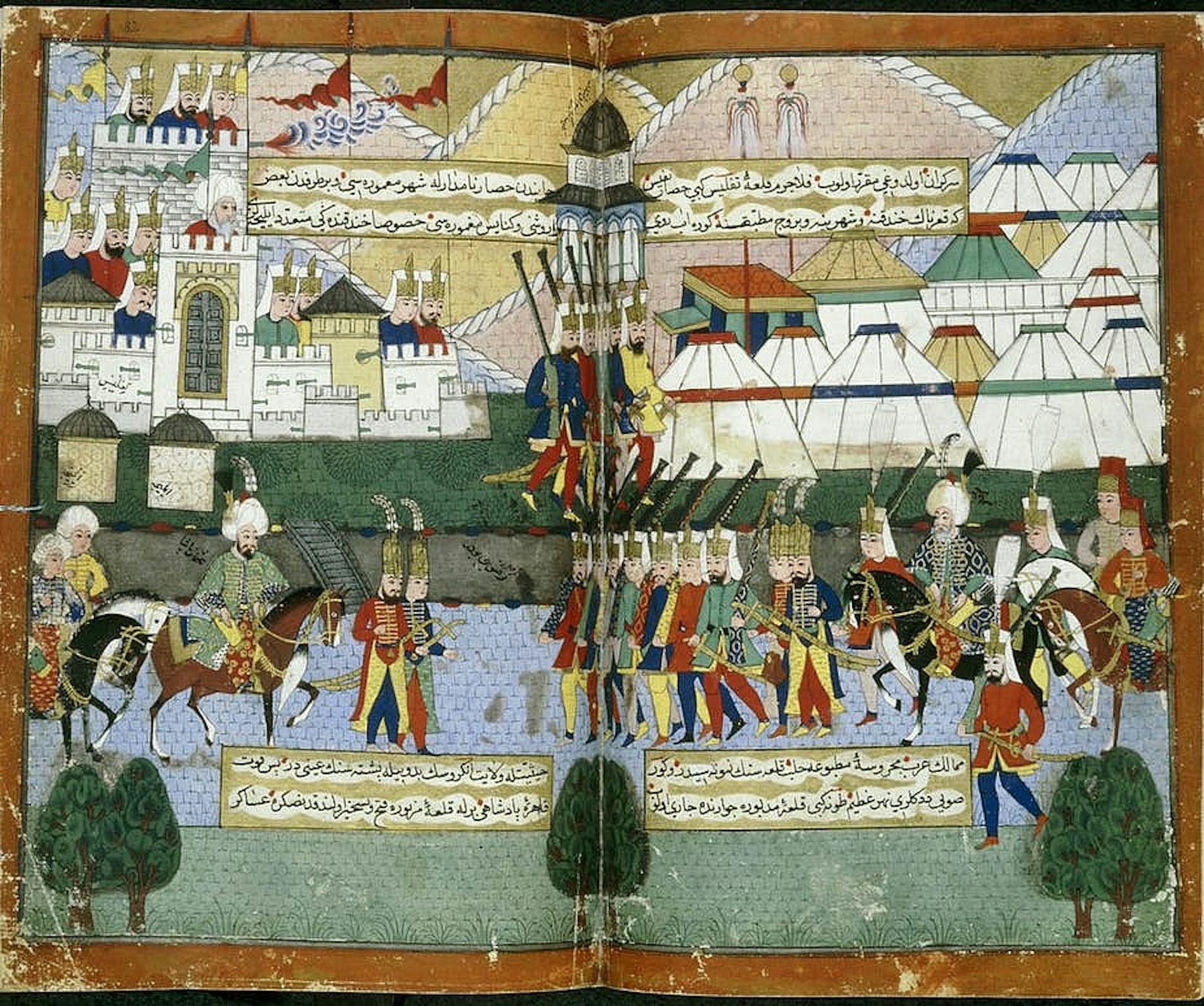
Ottoman army parading before the walls of Tbilisi in August 1578

Also during this same period, Circassians took an active part in the Ottoman–Safavid War (1578–1590), not merely as auxiliary forces but as an important military component of the Ottoman–Crimean coalition in the Caucasus. Ottoman and Crimean sources explicitly mention a number of Circassian princes (beys) who participated in the war, indicating a wide and geographically diverse involvement of Circassian elites from different tribes and regions.

The sources list the following Circassian beys who took part in the war

Beys of the Taman Peninsula:
Mehmed Bey
Mogatuk Bey

Beys of Zhaney:
Mehmed Bey
Davud Bey
Akhmed Bey

Muslim beys of Temirgoy:
Kanshuk Bey

Christian beys of Temirgoy:
Kazuk
Goksuk
Satuk
Kayatuk

Beys of Besleney:
Zor Bey

Beys of Bzhedug:
Kureken Bey
Alem Bey
Elbulad Bey

Beys of Shapsug:
Kastuk Bey
Jagtartuk Bey

Muslim Kabardian beys:
Arslan
Abak
Bozuk
Başil (Bashir)
Solukh
Kaplan
Gazi
Mehmed Mirza
Karaşay Bey

Christian Kabardian beys:
Kanshuk-bey
Zor-bey

According to Evliya Çelebi, the number of Circassian troops involved in the war reached as many as 70,000 men. These forces played a significant role in the Ottoman advance in the Caucasus and Transcaucasia, and are said to have assisted in the conquest of several important provinces, including Tbilisi. Circassian units also participated in the Battle of Torches, which ended as an important victory over Safavid–Georgian forces. During this battle, Circassians were assigned to command the right flank, indicating their trusted position within the Ottoman military structure. Furthermore, Circassians took part in the capture of Tbilisi in 1578 and later in the defense of the city during the Safavid siege of 1579. Contemporary accounts describe this siege as exceptionally bloody and destructive; according to the sources, at one point the defending force was reduced to only about fifty Circassians still remaining in the city.

In 1604, Svan lands were once again subjected to attack. In response, the Russian Tsar expressed his concern in a letter, stating:

"For centuries, the Sonsky land, under the rule of the Iberian kings, was one land, and the people were of one Christian faith; but not long ago, you, Prince Aristov, wanted to separate from Tsar Alexander, and for that, hostility and enmity arose between you."

In the same letter, the Tsar of Russia further declared:

"And now, our royal majesty, we desire that you, Prince Aristov, remain in peace and friendship with Tsar Alexander as before, and stand united against all your enemies."

In 1614, the Lesser Kabardian prince Mudar Alkhasov, whose domains were located in the Darial Gorge, traveled to the court of Safavid Iran and concluded an alliance with the Safavid shah Abbas the Great against the Ossetians and Ingushs. As part of this political alignment, Mudar increasingly oriented his policies toward cooperation with Iran and openly demonstrated his loyalty to the Safavid ruler. On 1 February 1615, an Astrakhan Tatar who had escaped from Mudar's captivity arrived in the city of Terek and reported that approximately thirty Persian soldiers had arrived together with Mudar and were residing in huts specially constructed for them in the prince's tavern camp. According to this report, Mudar openly boasted of his alliance with Shah Abbas, placing great hopes in Safavid support. In particular, the shah was expected to send a representative to secure the return of Mudar's son, who was being held hostage in Terek. At least, this was the version of events that Mudar himself communicated to other Kabardian princes. Subsequently, Mudar moved his taverns into the Darial Gorge and blocked the Georgian Military Road. This action was undertaken specifically in order to maintain reliable communications with the Persian garrisons stationed in Georgia. In effect, the Greater Caucasus Range functioned as the northern frontier of Iran, and control over the Darial passage was of strategic importance. Mudar placed guards near his taverns and thoroughly fortified all of them, thereby strengthening his position in the region and securing Safavid influence in the central Caucasus. As a result of these developments, in 1615 Shah Abbas, with the assistance of Kabardians under Mudar and Kumyks led by Ildar and Giray, launched an invasion of the Kingdom of Kakheti. The campaign ended with the conquest of Kakheti, further consolidating Safavid power in eastern Georgia and demonstrating the military and political significance of Kabardian and Kumyk cooperation in Abbas's Caucasian policy.

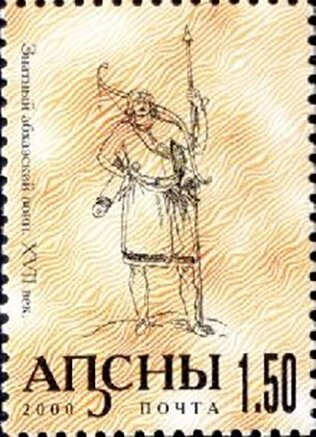
An image of an Abkhaz warrior from the time of the war by Teramo Castelli that was immortalized on the postal stamp of Abkhazia.

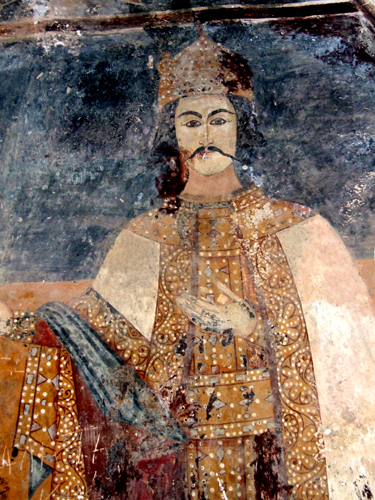
Fresco of Levan II Dadiani

In 1622, Levan II Dadiani accused his wife of committing adultery with the Grand Vizier Paata Tsulukia. As a punishment for this alleged act, he ordered that her nose, ears, and tongue be cut off, an act meant not only as retribution but also as a public humiliation and warning. After this, Levan eventually banished her from the court, sending her back to her father, Puto Shervashidze, who at that time held the position of Prince of Abkhazia. Following these events, Levan gathered a large army and in 1623 began a military campaign against Abkhazia. He crossed the Kelasuri River and carried out warfare across Abkhazian territory, while Prince Puto Shervashidze fled and took refuge in the fortress of Mchishte.

After recovering from the initial blows inflicted by Levan's campaign, the Abkhazians managed to form a broad alliance. This coalition included rebels from the House of Gurieli, the king of Imereti, and even Levan's own brother, which clearly demonstrated that opposition to Levan was growing and that even his relatives were beginning to distance themselves from him. Despite this, Levan succeeded in crushing the coalition and reasserting his control. Levan then marched through Abkhazia once again, destroying the Shervashidze Palace in Lykhny, an act that ultimately forced Puto Shervashidze to formally submit to him. However, after these events, several Circassian clans began arriving in Abkhazia in order to assist the Abkhazians, including Abazins, Ubykhs, and Kabardians.

It is generally believed that it was during these same years that Levan constructed the Kelasuri Wall, a long defensive fortification that extended from the sea along the Kelasuri River and then turned eastward, blocking the exits from the mountain gorges. Levan was able to repel Circassian raids for a certain period of time, but this situation did not last long, as he died in 1657. After Levan's death, the Shervashidze princes launched a counteroffensive and succeeded in carving out Megrelian lands up to the Ghalidzga River.

In the 16th century and the first half of the 17th century, particularly during the reign of Levan II Dadiani, the Principality of Mingrelia represented the strongest and most influential political power along the Georgian Black Sea coast. Owing to its economic strength, control over coastal trade routes, and relative internal stability, Mingrelia also maintained the most effective and numerous naval forces among the Georgian polities of the period. These naval forces allowed the principality to secure its coastline and, for a time, successfully deter maritime raids and piracy. However, following the death of Levan II Dadiani, Mingrelia rapidly entered a period of political decline. Central authority weakened, internal struggles intensified, and as a result the naval forces of the principality were gradually neglected and eventually disbanded. By the 1670s, Mingrelia was no longer capable of effectively defending its coastline. During this period, Circassian and especially Abkhazian pirates began to operate almost freely along the shores of Samegrelo, carrying out systematic raids that the local authorities could no longer repel.

A contemporary description of these events is provided by the French traveler Jean Chardin, who personally witnessed the situation during his journey through the region. Describing a raid that occurred in 1672, Chardin reports the following:

On the 12th (November) we were supposed to board a boat, but this was prevented by the news (which later proved to be entirely correct) that Circassian and Abkhazian boats were cruising along the shores of Mingrelia. They stole local boats, and with them the one I had hired.

Xaverio Glavani in his work Description of Circassia, composed on 20 January 1724, also mentions raids carried out against Georgia by Circassians from the Kuban region. In his account, these Circassians are described as acting together with Lezgins, and the main purpose of these expeditions is explicitly stated to have been the seizure of captives, who were taken as slaves. Glavani's description is based not only on general reports, but also on information he personally received from local informants, which gives the passage a semi-eyewitness character typical of early modern travel and ethnographic literature. According to Glavani, an elderly man from the Kuban, whom he describes in a favorable and respectful manner, recounted to him how he himself had taken part in such raids. This Kuban Circassian, together with Lezgins, crossed the Caucasus Mountains and entered Georgian territory with the deliberate intention of capturing people. After crossing Mount Caucasus, the raiders reportedly observed human settlements from afar and then approached them carefully, expecting to obtain booty, first and foremost in the form of captives. Glavani presents this episode as a matter-of-fact recollection, reflecting the normality of such raids in the eyes of the participants and illustrating the persistence of slave-raiding practices in the Caucasus well into the early 18th century. As quoted by Glavani, the Kuban informant stated:

The kindly [Kuban] old man who imparted all this information to me also told how he, along with the Lezgins, went to Georgia to collect slaves. Having crossed Mount Caucasus, they spotted human habitations and approached them, hoping to find some booty...

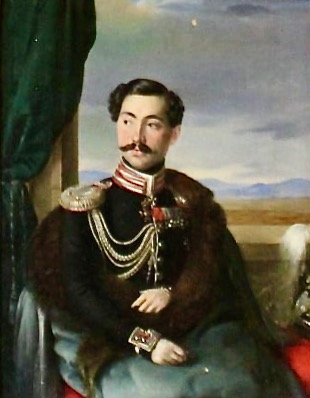
Portrait of David Dadiani

During the Russo–Circassian War, several Georgian principalities supported the Russian Empire against the Circassians.

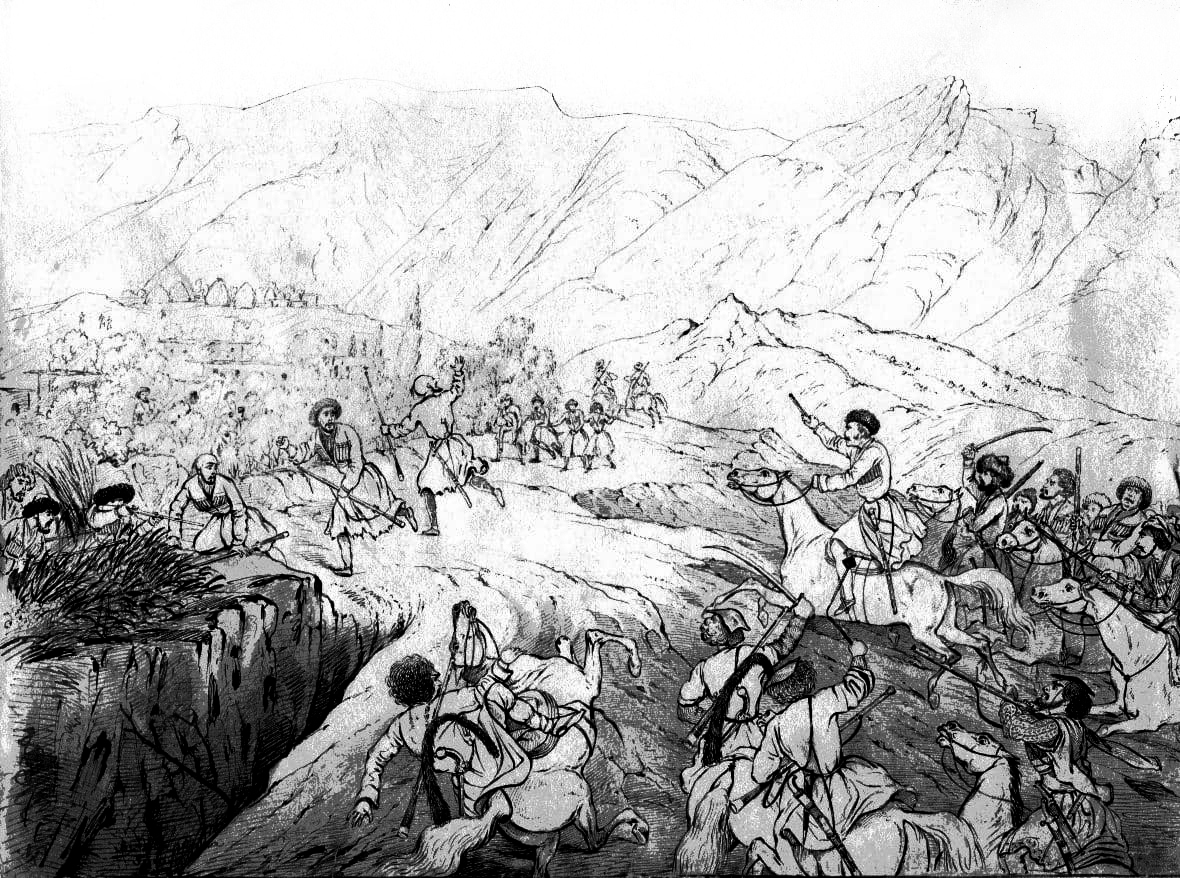
General Velyaminov’s Zakuban Expedition of 1837. Attack on a Circassian village by Mingrelian cavalry.

In 1841, a Mingrelian–Russian force under the command of David Dadiani launched an attack against Circassian tribes along the northwestern Caucasian coastline. Later, in 1845, Dadiani was promoted to the rank of major general. In October 1842, a regional Circassian force numbering approximately 5,000 men attacked a Russian–Georgian cavalry contingent of about 18,000 near Hamish. The Circassians employed guerrilla warfare tactics and reportedly chanted verses from the Quran to distract the enemy and raise morale. The Russian cavalry, unprepared for such tactics, was caught off guard, and around 3,500 Russian soldiers were killed. The remaining Russian forces retreated to ships stationed along the coast, as well as to the Scotcha fortress.

Ultimately, both sides were absorbed into the Russian Empire. Circassia was formally annexed in 1864 following the end of the Russo–Circassian War, while Georgia became fully incorporated into the empire 1867, after the annexation of the Principality of Mingrelia.

== List of conflicts ==
- Circassian–Georgian war (1509–1512)
- Mamia's expedition in Zygia
- Circassian raids into Georgia (1587-1604)

== Sources ==
- Gamakharia, Jemal (2011). Assays from the History of Georgia: Abkhazia from Ancient Times Till the Present Days (PDF). Tbilisi: Ministry of Education and Culture of Abkhazia & Institute of History and Ethnology of Iv. Javakhishvili. ISBN 9789941039287.
- Tishkov, V. A. (2022). Adygi (PDF) (in Russian). Moscow.
- Kagazezhev, Zhiroslan V. (2009). The Struggle of the Adyghes (Circassians) for National Statehood: Historical Aspect (14th – First Half of the 16th Centuries) (PDF) (in Russian). Vladikavkaz: North Ossetian State University named after K. L. Khetagurov.
- Beradze, Tamaz (2008). სამხედრო-საზღვაო საქმის ისტორიიდან (PDF) (in Georgian). Tbilisi.
