= Miusera =

Miusera Georgian: მიუსერა Abkhaz: Мысра
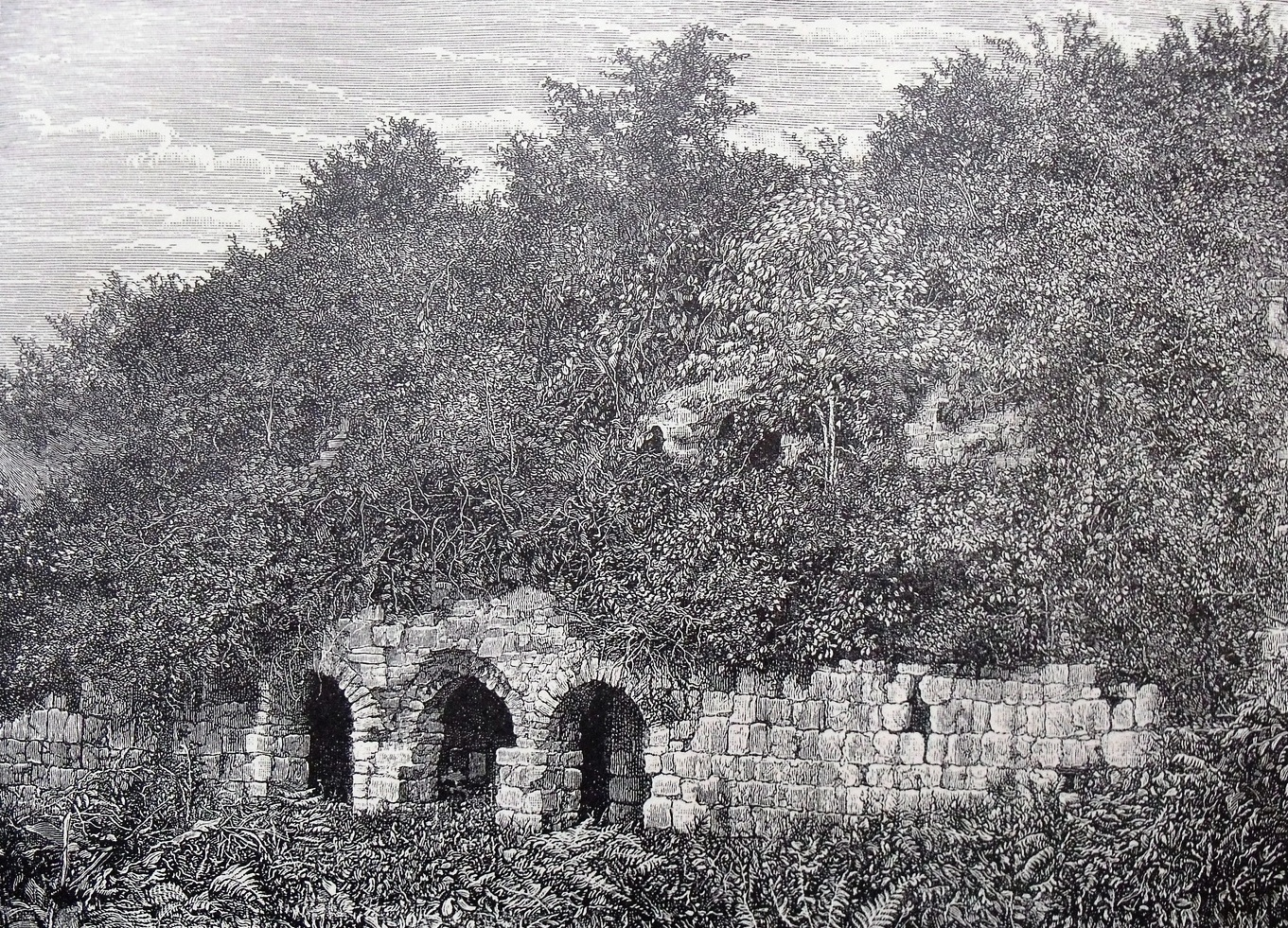
- Ruins of the Ambara church around 1899.

- Location of Miusera in Abkhazia

- Location within Georgia Location within Abkhazia
- Coordinates: 43°10′N 40°29′E
- Country: Georgia
- Partially recognized independent country: Abkhazia
- District: Gudauta
- Time zone: UTC+3 (MSK)
  - Summer (DST): UTC+4

Miusera (Georgian: მიუსერა, miusera; Abkhaz: Мысра, Mysra; Russian: Мюссера, Myussera) also spelled as Miuseri is an urban settlement located in the Gudauta District of Abkhazia, a disputed region on the Black Sea coast.

== See also ==
- Ambara church
- Bichvinta-Miuseri Strict Nature Reserve
