= Ailaga-Abiqu church =

Ruined medieval Eastern Orthodox church

Ailaga-Abiqu church აილაგა-აბიყუს ეკლესია (in Georgian) Ауахәама «Аилага-абыҟә» (in Abkhaz)
- Location within Abkhazia Location within Georgia

Religion
- Affiliation: Georgian Orthodox
- Province: Abkhazia
- Ecclesiastical or organizational status: ruins

Location
- Location: (Georgia (country)) Bombora, Gudauta Municipality, Abkhazia, Georgia
- Interactive map of Ailaga-Abiqu church აილაგა-აბიყუს ეკლესია (in Georgian); Ауахәама «Аилага-абыҟә» (in Abkhaz)
- Coordinates: 43°6′22″N 40°33′50″E

Architecture
- Type: Church
- Completed: 10th century

The Ailaga-Abiqu church (Georgian: აილაგა-აბიყუს ეკლესია; Abkhaz: Ауахәама «Аилага-абыҟә») is a ruined medieval Eastern Orthodox church in Abkhazia, a breakaway region of Georgia. It is located at the village of Bombora, on the Black Sea coast, 5 km west of the town of Gudauta.

== History ==
Ailaga-Abiqu is a complex of three ruined churches, which, based on their architectural features, can be dated to the period of the 8th-10th century. The original name of the church is unknown and there are no historical records on its construction. The current name is a local Abkhaz popular designation, literally meaning "a tangled tower." The largest—and best preserved—of the three churches is a northern one. Its extant northern wall rises up to 6.8 meters. It is a single-nave design with a pentahedral apse—which is of the same width as the nave—and a narrow narthex attached to the west. Remnants of two pairs of pilasters in the longitudinal walls indicate that the church was vaulted. The walls were faced with limestone and sandstone slabs. The only survived adornment is a Christian cross carved in relief on the southern entrance wall. The two closely adjacent smaller churches were apparently built later in the 10th or 11th century. One of these has two levels, of which only the lower one survives. It might have served as a burial chamber for local rulers.
