= Bichvinta-Miuseri Strict Nature Reserve =

Protected nature area in Georgia (country)

- IUCN category Ia (strict nature reserve)
- Location within Georgia Location within Abkhazia
- Location: Georgia; Abkhazia
- Coordinates: 43°10′27″N 40°25′32″E
- Area: 75.33 km^{2} (29.09 sq mi)
- Established: 1965
- Governing body: Agency of Protected Areas
- Website: Strict Nature Reserve Info

Bichvinta-Miuseri Strict Nature Reserve (Georgian: ბიჭვინთა-მიუსერის სახელმწიფო ნაკრძალი, romanized: bich'vinta-miuseris sakhelmts'ipo nak'rdzali) is a protected area in the Gagra District and Gudauta District of Abkhazia, Georgia. The reserve's main goal is protecting Bichvinta's relic and colonized flora and fauna.

== Geography ==
Bichvinta-Miuseri Strict Nature Reserve is located on the Black Sea coast of Abkhazia and has three sections: Miusera (215 hectares), Lidzava (165 hectares) and Pitsunda (1296 hectares).

== Flora ==
Bichvinta-Miuseri Strict Nature Reserve famous for groves of Pitsundian pine (Pinus brutia var. pityusa). There are also Buxus colchica, Caucasian walnut (Pterocarya fraxinifolia), yew (Taxus baccata), Colchic figs (Ficus colchica), and Diospyros lotus which are typical for landscapes around the Mediterranean Sea.

== See also ==
- Pitsunda
