= Blaburkhva =

Blaburkhva ბლაბურხვა
- Location within Georgia Location within Abkhazia
- Coordinates: 43°19′39″N 40°27′27″E
- Country: Georgia
- Autonomous Republic: Abkhazia
- Municipality: Gudauta

Population (2011)
  - Total: 633

Blaburkhva (Georgian: ბლაბურხვა; Abkhaz: Блабырхәа, also spelled Blabyrkhua) is a village in the Gudauta District of Abkhazia, Georgia.

== Population ==
According to the 1959 Soviet Census, 167 people (all Abkhazians) lived within the village itself, with a total of 827 people living within the Blaburkhva village council (which consisted of four additional settlements). By 1989, 151 people lived in the settlement, which was still composed entirely of Abkhazians.
