= Likhni Church Aba-Ata =

Church in Lykhny, Autonomous Republic of Abkhazia, Georgia

Likhni Church Aba-Ata ლიხნის ეკლესია აბა-ათა (in Georgian) Лыхнытәи ауахәама Абаҭаа (in Abkhaz)
- Location within Abkhazia Location within Georgia

Religion
- Affiliation: Georgian Orthodox
- Province: Abkhazia
- Ecclesiastical or organizational status: ruins

Location
- Location: (Georgia (country)) Bombora, Gudauta Municipality, Abkhazia, Georgia
- Interactive map of Likhni Church Aba-Ata ლიხნის ეკლესია აბა-ათა (in Georgian); Лыхнытәи ауахәама Абаҭаа (in Abkhaz)
- Coordinates: 43°07′21″N 40°37′35″E

Architecture
- Type: Church
- Completed: High Middle Ages

Likhni Church “Aba-Ata” (Georgian: ლიხნის ეკლესია აბა-ათა, Abkhaz: Лыхнытәи ауахәама Абаҭаа) is a church in the village of Lykhny, Gudauta Municipality, Autonomous Republic of Abkhazia, Georgia.

The church was built in the High Middle Ages. The church walls are in a heavy physical condition and need urgent conservation. The church was awarded the category of a real cultural monument of national importance on November 7, 2006, by a decree of the President of Georgia.
