= Khipsta =

River in Georgia

- Location within Abkhazia Location within Georgia

Location
- Country: Abkhazia Georgia
- State: Gudauta District

Physical characteristics
- Source
  - location: Caucasus Major
  - elevation: 2,134 m (7,001 ft)
- Mouth: Georgia/Abkhazia
  - location: Black Sea
  - coordinates: 43°7′28″N 40°32′42″E
  - elevation: 0 ft (0 m)
- Length: 33 km (21 mi)
- Basin size: 166 square kilometres (64 mi^{2})
- Discharge
  - average: 9.76 m^{3}/s (345 cu ft/s)

Khipsta (Georgian: ხიფსთა Abkhaz: Хыҧсҭа) is a river in the West Caucasus in Abkhazia, Georgia. It originates on the southern slopes of the mountain Khipsta. It flows into the Black Sea near city Gudauta.
