= Mugudzirkhva Church =

Ruined medieval church in Abkhazia

Mugudzirkhva Church მუგუძირხვის ეკლესია (in Georgian)
- Location within Abkhazia Location within Georgia

Religion
- Affiliation: Georgian Orthodox
- Province: Abkhazia
- Ecclesiastical or organizational status: ruins

Location
- Location: (Georgia (country)) Mugudzirkhva, Gudauta Municipality, Abkhazia, Georgia
- Interactive map of Mugudzirkhva Church მუგუძირხვის ეკლესია (in Georgian)
- Coordinates: 43°09′05″N 40°31′28″E

Architecture
- Type: Church
- Completed: Middle Ages

Mugudzyrkhva Church (Georgian: მუგუძირხვის ეკლესია) is a ruined medieval church near the village of Mugudzirkhva, Gudauta municipality, Abkhazia, an entity in the South Caucasus with a disputed political status.

The ruins stand on a rocky hill in the Mchishta ravine. The ruined church was a hall-church design, its more or less preserved northern wall faced with limestone slabs. There are the remains of pilasters which once supported arches of the vault. The eastern wall with a protruding apse and the southern wall are almost completely ruined. Numerous shivers of roof tiles are scattered around the edifice.
