= Ambara church =

Ruined church complex in Abkhazia/Georgia

Likhni Church Aba-Ata ამბარას ეკლესია (in Georgian)
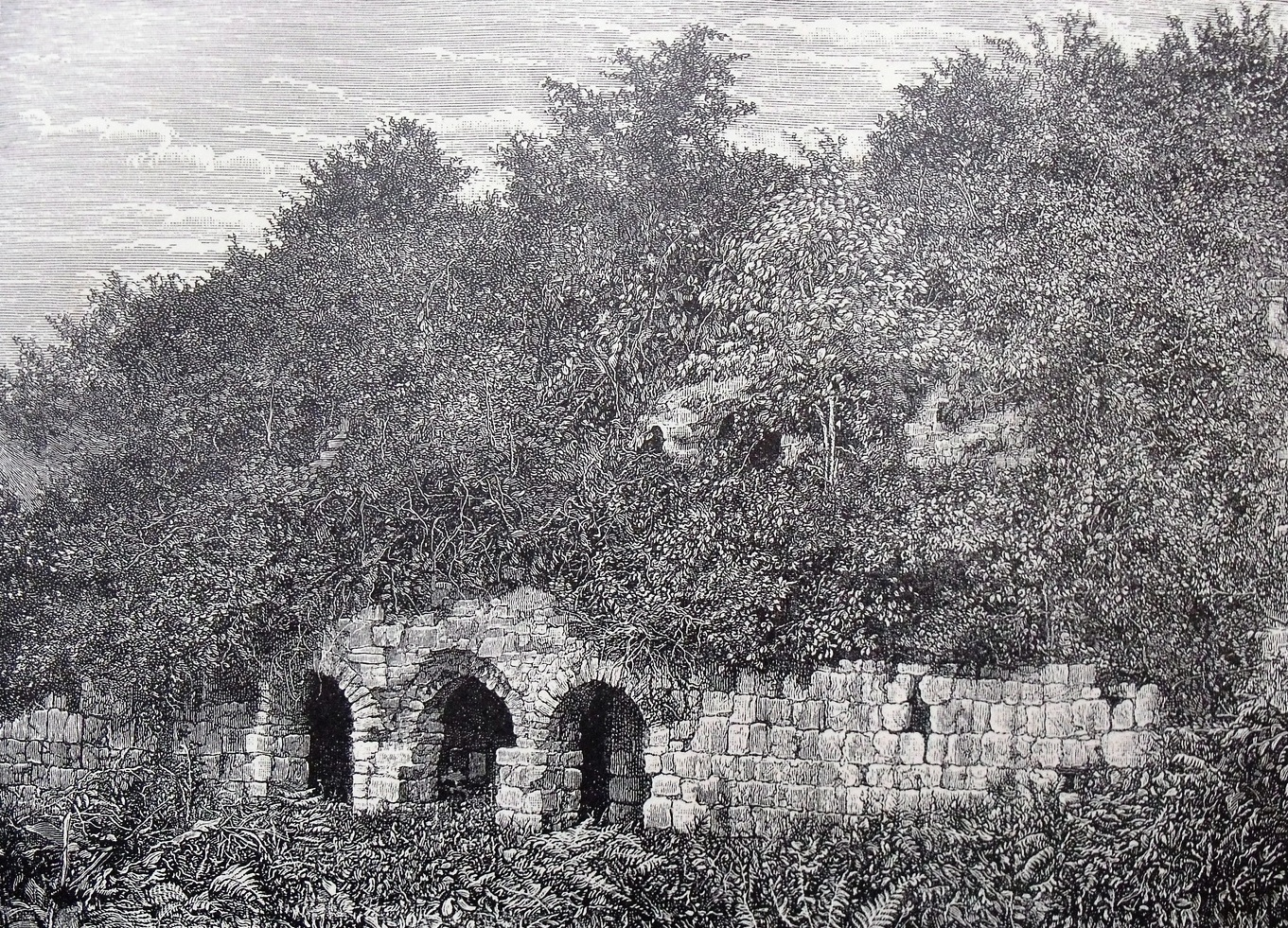
- Ruins of the Ambara church around 1899.

- Location within Abkhazia Location within Georgia

Religion
- Affiliation: Georgian Orthodox
- Province: Abkhazia (Note: The political status of Abkhazia is disputed. Having unilaterally declared independence from Georgia in 1992, Abkhazia is formally recognised as an independent state by 4 UN member states (three other states previously recognised it but then withdrew their recognition), while the remainder of the international community recognizes it as de jure Georgian territory. Georgia continues to claim the area as its own territory, designating it as Russian-occupied territory.)
- Ecclesiastical or organisational status: ruins

Location
- Location: (Georgia (country)) Miusera, Gudauta Municipality, Abkhazia, Georgia
- Coordinates: 43°08′37″N 40°29′23″E

Architecture
- Type: Church
- Completed: 7–8th century, reconstructed in Late Middle Ages

The Ambara church (Georgian: ამბარას ეკლესია) is located near village Miusera in the Gudauta District, Abkhazia/Georgia, on the cape of Miusera, close to the mouth of the Ambara stream. Ambara three-nave basilica represents an important example of this type of architectural monuments. Ambara church has been given the status of cultural heritage monument.

== History ==
The Ambara church complex consists of a half-ruined three-nave basilica (first built in 7–8th century), a stone fence (Middle Ages) and remains of several additional secular structures, dated by scholars from the 8th to the 10th century. The basilica has roughly processed ashlar stone surface stones that have survived almost in its original form, a two-storey narthex and an upper gallery on the west facade. The main nave vault bears traces of the Late Medieval reconstruction.

The Ambara church belongs to a small group of Abkhazian churches described as basilicas with isolated side aisles, a type that also includes the churches at Old Gagra and the Aba-Ata fortress at Likhny. From outside it resembles an ordinary basilica, but inside the three naves are separated, each with its own entrance from the narthex, and the central nave is the longest and widest. All three apses are semicircular outside and horseshoe-shaped inside.

The main entrances are in the west and south walls, and the south facade has a three-arched bay beneath a pediment, which the Abkhaz art historian Suram Sakania describes as unique among basilicas in Abkhazia and Transcaucasia. Sources give the church's dimensions as about 20 by 15 metres and as 16 by 14 metres. Levan Rcheulishvili first dated it to the 7th to 8th centuries and later to the 8th to 10th centuries, while other writers place it as late as the 10th to 12th centuries.

The Ambara church is one of the tourist destinations in Abkhazia. The area is reportedly increasingly being littered. Georgia has inscribed the church on its list of cultural heritage and treats it as part of cultural heritage in the Russian-occupied territories with no known current state of condition.
