= Otkhara Castle =

Castle in a village of Georgia

- Location within Abkhazia Location within Georgia
- 43°14′00″N 40°32′00″E
- Location: (Georgia (country)) Otkhara, Gudauta Municipality, Abkhazia, Georgia

History
- Built: Middle Ages

Site notes
- Area: Gudauta Municipality

Otkhara Castle is a castle in the village of Otkhara, Gudauta Municipality, Autonomous Republic of Abkhazia, Georgia. The castle was built in the Middle Ages. The castle walls are in a heavy physical condition and need urgent conservation.

== See also ==
- Otkhara Cave Monastery Complex
