= Gudauta Bay =

Coordinates: 43°5′40″N 40°38′44″E

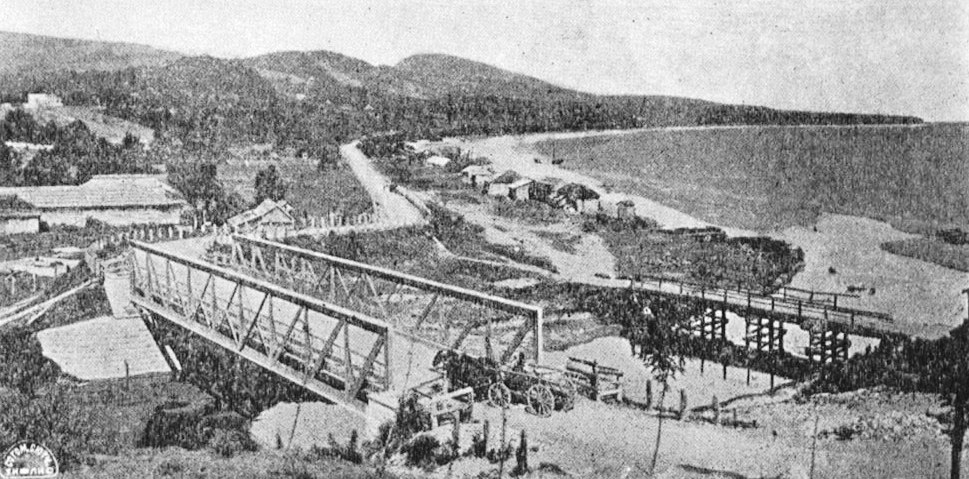
- Gudauta Bay in 1913

- Location within Abkhazia Location within Georgia
- Location: Black Sea
- Ocean/sea sources: Atlantic Ocean
- Basin countries: Abkhazia/Georgia
- Settlements: Gudauta

Gudauta Bay (Georgian: გუდაუთის ყურე, Russian: Гудаутская бухта) is a bay of the Black Sea situated adjacent to the town of Gudauta, in Abkhazia, a territory internationally recognised as part of Georgia. The bay forms part of the eastern Black Sea coastline.

== Geography ==
Gudauta Bay opens westward into the Black Sea and lies along the coastal zone of Abkhazia. The settlement of Gudauta is located on its eastern shore. The bay is depicted in early twentieth-century cartographic and photographic records, including pre-1917 Russian sources.
