= Circassian raids on Georgia (1509–1512) =

Circassian Invasions of Mingrelia
- Part of the Circassian–Georgian wars
| Date | 1509–1512 |
| Location | Samegrelo |
| Result | Circassian victory: Devastation of Western Georgia |

Belligerents
| Circassia; Abazinia | Kingdom of Imereti |

Commanders and leaders
| Tsandiya Yinal Dafita | Alexander II of Imereti # Bagrat III of Imereti |

Strength
| Unknown | Unknown |

Casualties and losses
| Unknown, possibly less | Heavy looses: Many killed, captured, and enslaved |

The Circassian raids on Georgia (1509–1512) were a series of military campaigns launched by the Circassians against the Georgian region of Mingrelia under the Kingdom of Imereti in western Georgia, primarily by the Circassian prince Tsandiya Yinal Dafit ("The Hated")

== History ==
In 1509, the Circassians launched a major raid into the region of Mingrelia (Samegrelo), which was under the control of Imereti. Judging by the Georgian chronicle of Brosset, the campaign was led by the Circassian prince Tsandiya Yinal Dafita, meaning "Yinal the Hated" Yinal Dafita invaded Imereti and killed a large amount of Christians who opposed him and took many as captives, but the captured prisoners were later ransomed by the Patriarch of Abkhazia

Circassians, however, did not stop their incursions into Georgia. They reportedly kept raiding and ravaging the land of Mingrelia from 1510 to 1512. Contemporary Georgian sources report that many inhabitants of the region were captured during these raids, enslaved, and subsequently sold in the markets of the Crimean Khanate.

== Aftermath ==
As a revenge of the raid, in 1533, Mamia III Dadiani launched a campaign against the Zygii Circassians. The allied Mingrelian and Gurian naval forces landed on Jiketi on January 30. The first battle, despite the fierce Zygii defense was won by the allies. But on the next day, many battle-fatigued Mingrelian nobles defected their lord at the instigation of Inal-Ipa, an Abkhaz. The allies were routed; Mamia Dadiani was disarmed, stripped naked, and stabbed to death, while Mamia Gurieli was taken prisoner. Malachia I Abashidze, Catholicos of Imereti and Abkhazia, went to the Zygii and ransomed the survivors and bodies of those who died.
