= Lykhny =

Human settlement in Georgia

Lykhny Georgian: ლიხნი Abkhaz: Лыхны
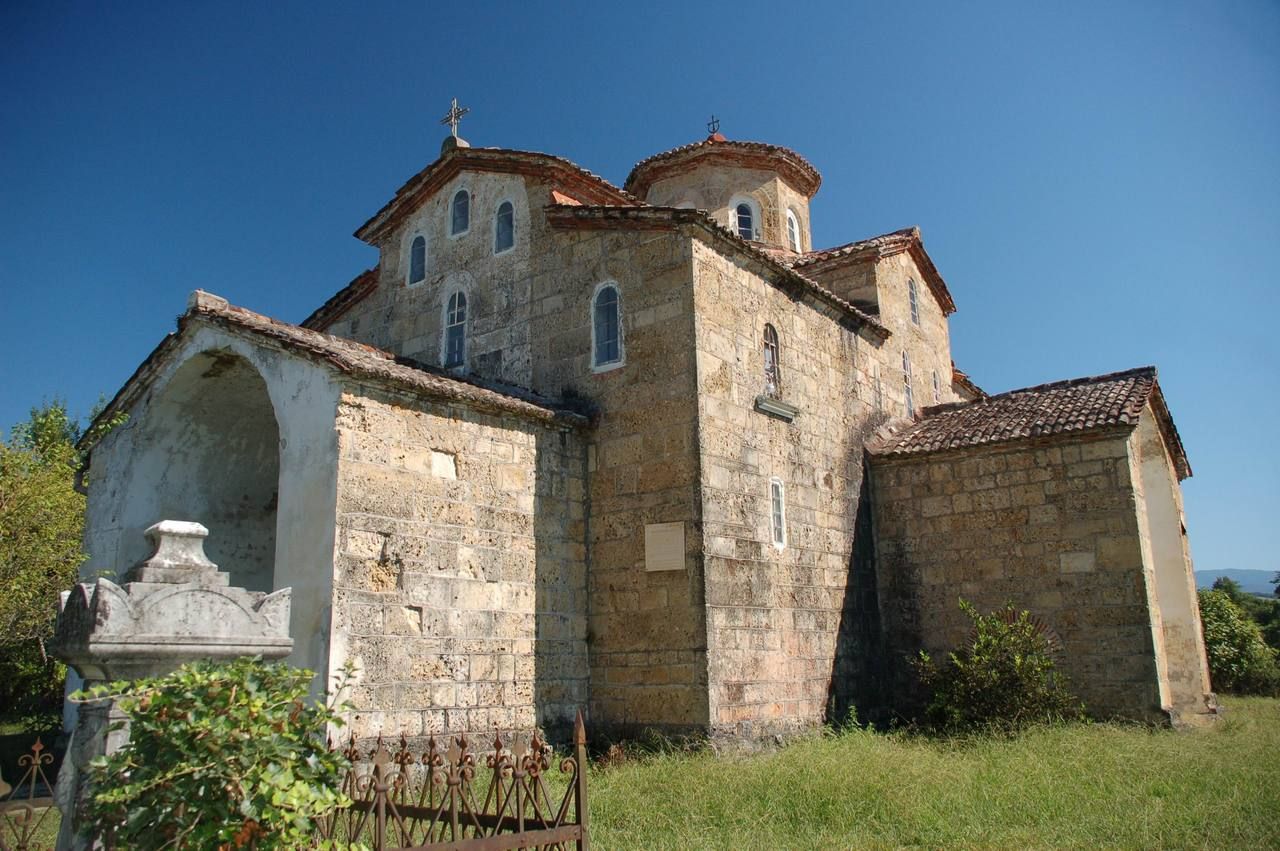
- Church of the Virgin Mary

- Location within Georgia Location within Abkhazia
- Coordinates: 43°09′N 40°37′E
- Country: Georgia
- Partially recognized independent country: Abkhazia
- District: Gudauta
- Time zone: UTC+3 (MSK)
  - Summer (DST): UTC+4

Lykhny (Georgian: ლიხნი; Abkhaz: Лыхны) is a village in the Gudauta District of Abkhazia, a disputed region on the Black Sea coast.

== History ==
In medieval Georgian sources the village is also known as Zupu (ზუფუ). The village lies along the narrow Black Sea plain of Abkhazia at an elevation of 50 meters above sea level. Lykhny is located five kilometers from the administrative center of Gudauta. There are several important historical monuments in and around Lykhny. Of particular importance are the 10-11th century Church of the Virgin Mary and the ruins of a two-storey palace which was used as a residence by the princes of Abkhazia (the palace collapsed in 1866 when the Russian punitive expedition attacked the village). An older monument, the fortress of Abaanta (built in the 7th century) is located at the edge of the village on the left bank of the Khipsta River.

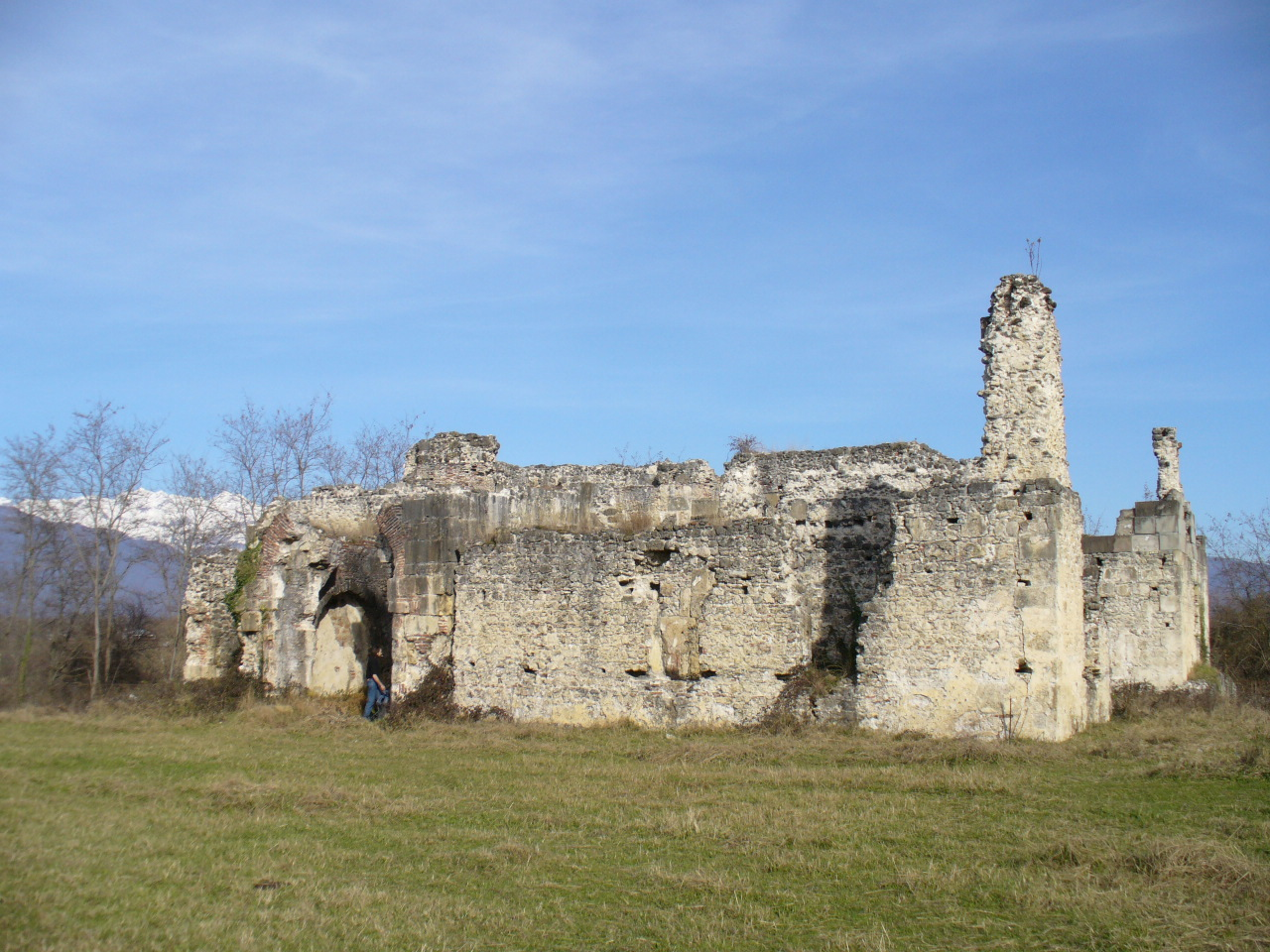
Ruins of the palace of the Shervashidze princes

Lykhnashta, a large square located centrally in the village, is one of the seven shrines of the Abkhaz people and the place where is held the harvest festival every October. The square was also the place of the gathering of all the Abkhaz in 1931 and 1989.

Abkhaz Communist revolutionary Nestor Lakoba was born in Lykhny in 1893.

== See also ==
- Shervashidze’s Palace
- 1989 Sukhumi riots
