= Msygkhua church =

Ruined medieval church at the village of Primorskoe (Tskuara) in Abkhazia, Georgia

Msygkhua Church მსიგხვის ეკლესია (in Georgian) Мсыгәхәа ауахәама (in Abkhaz)
- Location within Abkhazia Location within Georgia

Religion
- Affiliation: Georgian Orthodox
- Province: Abkhazia
- Ecclesiastical or organizational status: ruins

Location
- Location: (Georgia (country)) Primorskoe, Gudauta Municipality, Abkhazia, Georgia
- Interactive map of Msygkhua Church მსიგხვის ეკლესია (in Georgian); Мсыгәхәа ауахәама (in Abkhaz)
- Coordinates: 43°05′18″N 40°42′03″E

Architecture
- Type: Church
- Completed: 8-9th century

The Msygkhua church (Georgian: მსიგხვის ეკლესია; Abkhaz: Мсыгәхәа ауахәама) is a ruined medieval church at the village of Primorskoe (Tskuara) in Abkhazia, a disputed region of Georgia. It is located on the eponymous hill in the Tskuara river valley, immediately west of the town of New Athos, at the Black Sea coastline.

== History ==
In 1962, the remains of an old cult building were found on Msigkhva Mountain. The ruins were excavated and dated to the 10th century by Anatoly Katsia in the 1960s. It is a small edifice, with the dimensions of 9.8 x 7.6 m. The walls survive to the height of 1.6 m. The church is set in a Middle Byzantine cross-in-square design, with the dome resting on four cruciform columns and three protruding apses, of which the central one was pentahedral on the exterior and horseshoe-shaped on the interior, while the side apses were semi-circular in shape. Liturgical items such as three tables in the center of each apse and parts of the altar screen have survived. Among the fragments of the tiles part of an antefix with a "Maltese cross" and Georgian inscriptions were discovered, which make it clear that the church was built in the name of Archangel Michael. It is one of the earliest specimens of Georgian script found in Abkhazia and western Georgia in general.
