= Lykhny Church =

10th century church in Georgia

Church of Dormition of Lykhny ლიხნის ტაძარი (in Georgian)
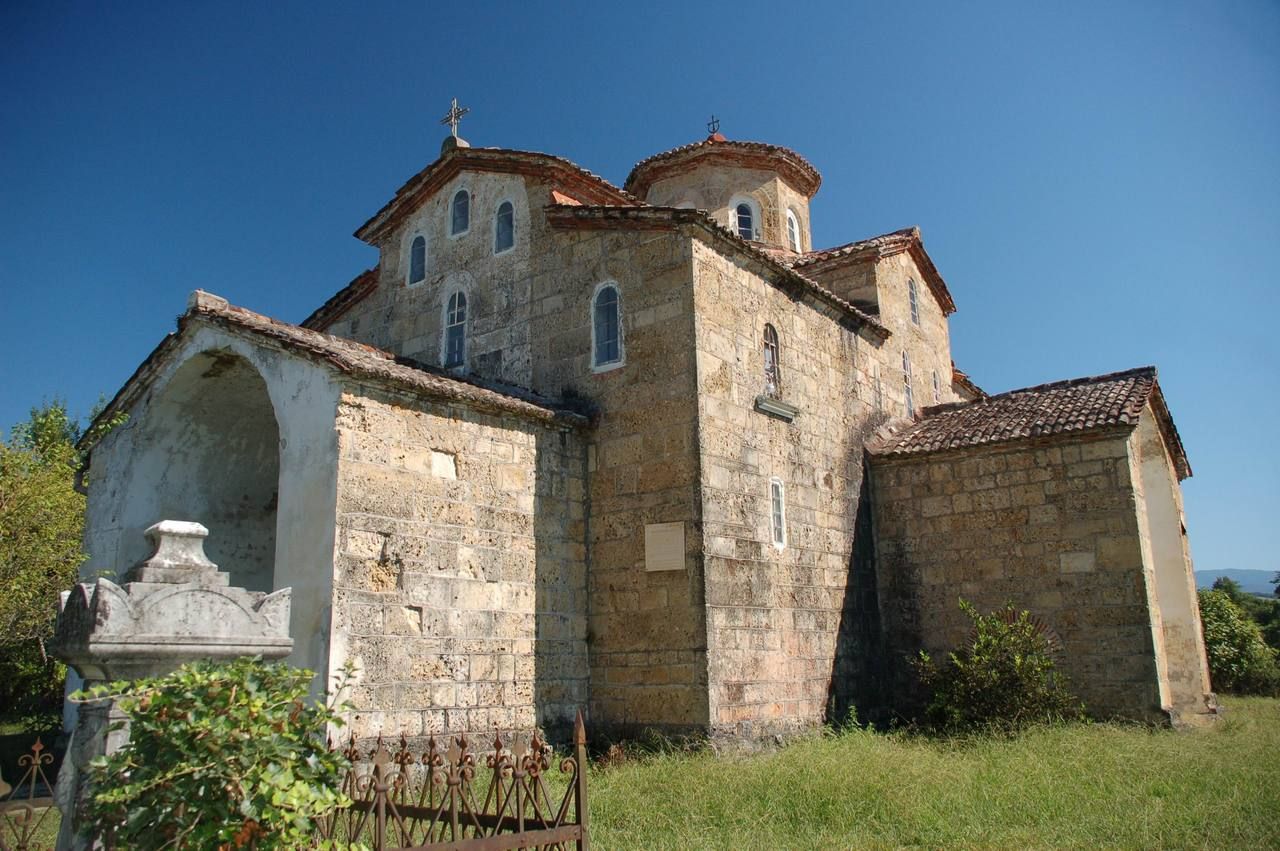
- Church of Dormition of Lykhny

- Location within Abkhazia Location within Georgia

Religion
- Affiliation: Georgian Orthodox
- Province: Abkhazia

Location
- Location: (Georgia (country)) Bombora, Gudauta Municipality, Abkhazia, Georgia
- Coordinates: 43°08′23″N 40°37′04″E

Architecture
- Type: Church
- Completed: 10th century

The Church of Dormition of Lykhny (Georgian: ლიხნის ტაძარი, romanized: likhnis t'adzari) is a medieval Orthodox Christian church in the village of Lykhny in Abkhazia/Georgia, built in the 10th century.

== History ==
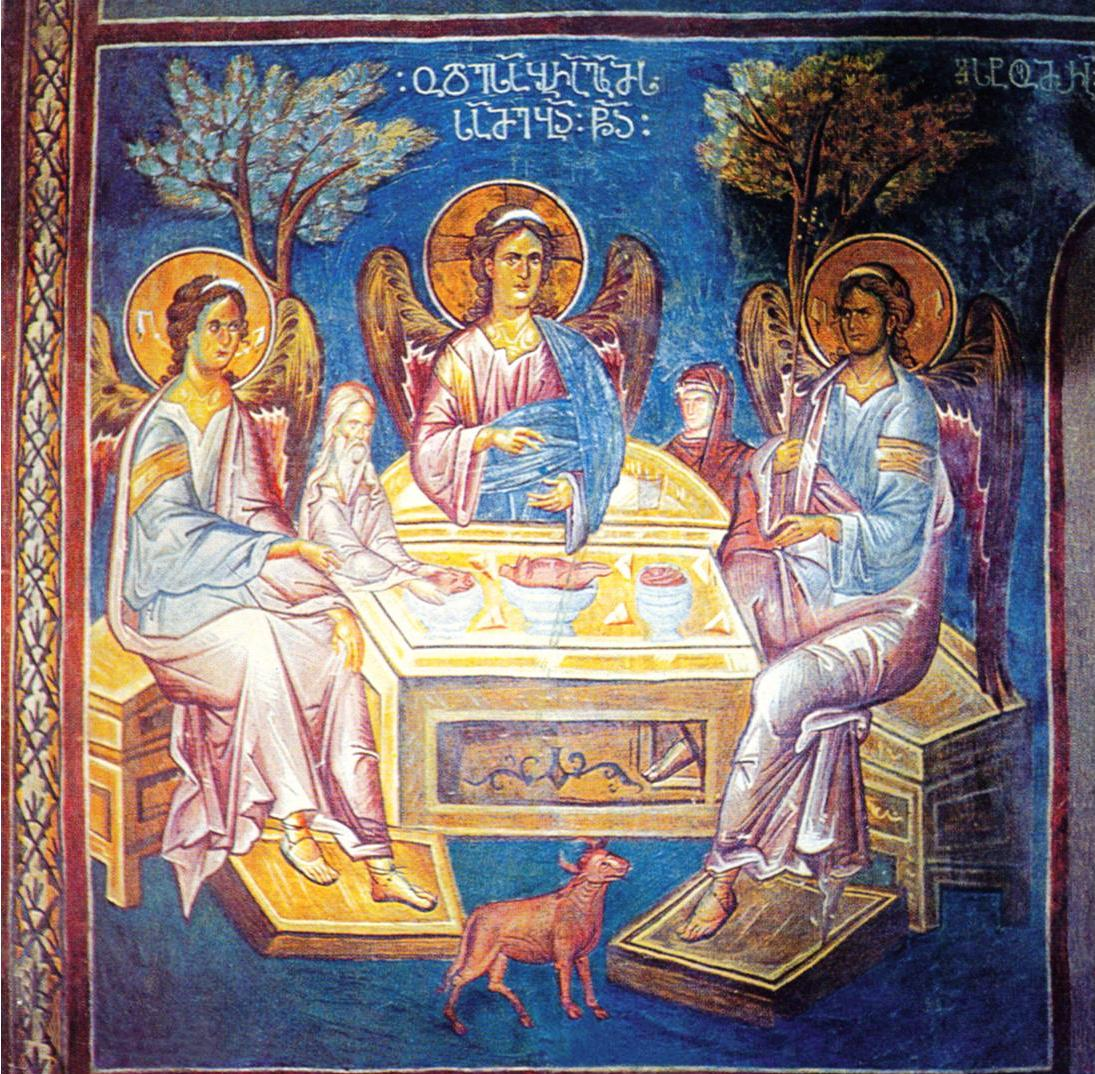
A 14th-century fresco depicting Abraham and the Holy Trinity with a Georgian inscription.

Its 14th-century frescoes are influenced by the contemporary Byzantine art and adorned with more than a dozen Georgian and Greek inscriptions.

The Lykhny church is a domed cross-in-square design, built of straight rows of well-refined ashlar stone. The small dome, with a low drum and a sloping roof, is based on four freely standing piers. The western portion of the building includes an upper gallery. The façades are simple, apertured with windows and marked with three protruding apses protruding from the east wall. There are traces of the 10th-11th-century wall painting, but the extant cycle of frescoes date to the 14th century. They are characterized by neatly colored, dynamic, and expressive paintings of somewhat elongated human figures.

The antiquities of Lykhny, then also known as Souk-Su, were first studied and published, in 1848, by the French scholar Marie-Félicité Brosset, who also copied several medieval Georgian and Greek inscriptions from the Lykhny church. Of note is the Georgian inscription, in the asomtavruli script, relating the apparition of Halley's Comet in 1066, in the reign of Bagrat IV of Georgia.

Efforts at conservation have been launched by the de facto Abkhaz authorities in 2010. The works, according to Georgian specialists, carry the risk of authenticity infringement. The Lykhny church is inscribed on Georgia's list of Monuments of National Significance.
