= Anukhva church =

Ruined medieval church on the right bank of Psirtskha river

Anukhva church ანუხვის ეკლესია (in Georgian)
- Location within Abkhazia Location within Georgia

Religion
- Affiliation: Georgian Orthodox
- Province: Abkhazia (Note: The political status of Abkhazia is disputed. Having unilaterally declared independence from Georgia in 1992, Abkhazia is formally recognised as an independent state by 5 UN member states (two other states previously recognised it but then withdrew their recognition), while the remainder of the international community recognizes it as de jure Georgian territory. Georgia continues to claim the area as its own territory, designating it as Russian-occupied territory.)
- Ecclesiastical or organizational status: ruins

Location
- Location: (Georgia (country)) Anukhva, Gudauta Municipality, Abkhazia, Georgia
- Interactive map of Anukhva church ანუხვის ეკლესია (in Georgian)
- Coordinates: 43°07′20″N 40°50′00″E

Architecture
- Type: Church
- Completed: 11th century

The Anukhva church (Georgian: ანუხვის ეკლესია, romanized: anukhvis ek'lesia) is a ruined medieval church on the right bank of Psirtskha river at the village of Anukhva in Gudauta District in Abkhazia, a breakaway region of Georgia. It is located in the hills immediately south of the town of New Athos, at the Black Sea coastline.

== History ==
Only a pile of ruins survives of what appears to have been a hall church with a protruding apse and tiled roof. Several pieces of ornate masonry, some adorned with medieval inscriptions, have been retrieved from the site at various times and brought for safekeeping to a museum in Sokhumi. One artifact, a limestone slab of the altar screen measuring 78 x 73 x 10.5 cm, bears the image of an equestrian St. George slaying the prostrate emperor Diocletian—a recurrent scene in the medieval Georgian art—and is dated to the 10th-11th centuries. Another slab, measuring 76 х 78 cm, depicts the Crucifixion with the accompanying Greek and Georgian inscriptions. A part of the base of the limestone altar cross, measuring 28 x 100 x 20.5 cm, is decorated with an ornate cross and a Georgian inscription in the asomtavruli script, dated to the 11th century. It mentions the certain George, son of Basil (Giorgi Basilis-dze), and members of his household, who had installed the cross in the church. Other artifacts found at the site include an ornate column of the altar screen and a lead ring with the inscribed Georgian text addressing to "Saint George, of the Monastery of Anakhvi".
