= Shervashidze Palace =

Palace ruins in Lykhny, Abkhazia/Georgia

Sharvashidze Palace
- შარვაშიძეების სასახლე (Georgian)
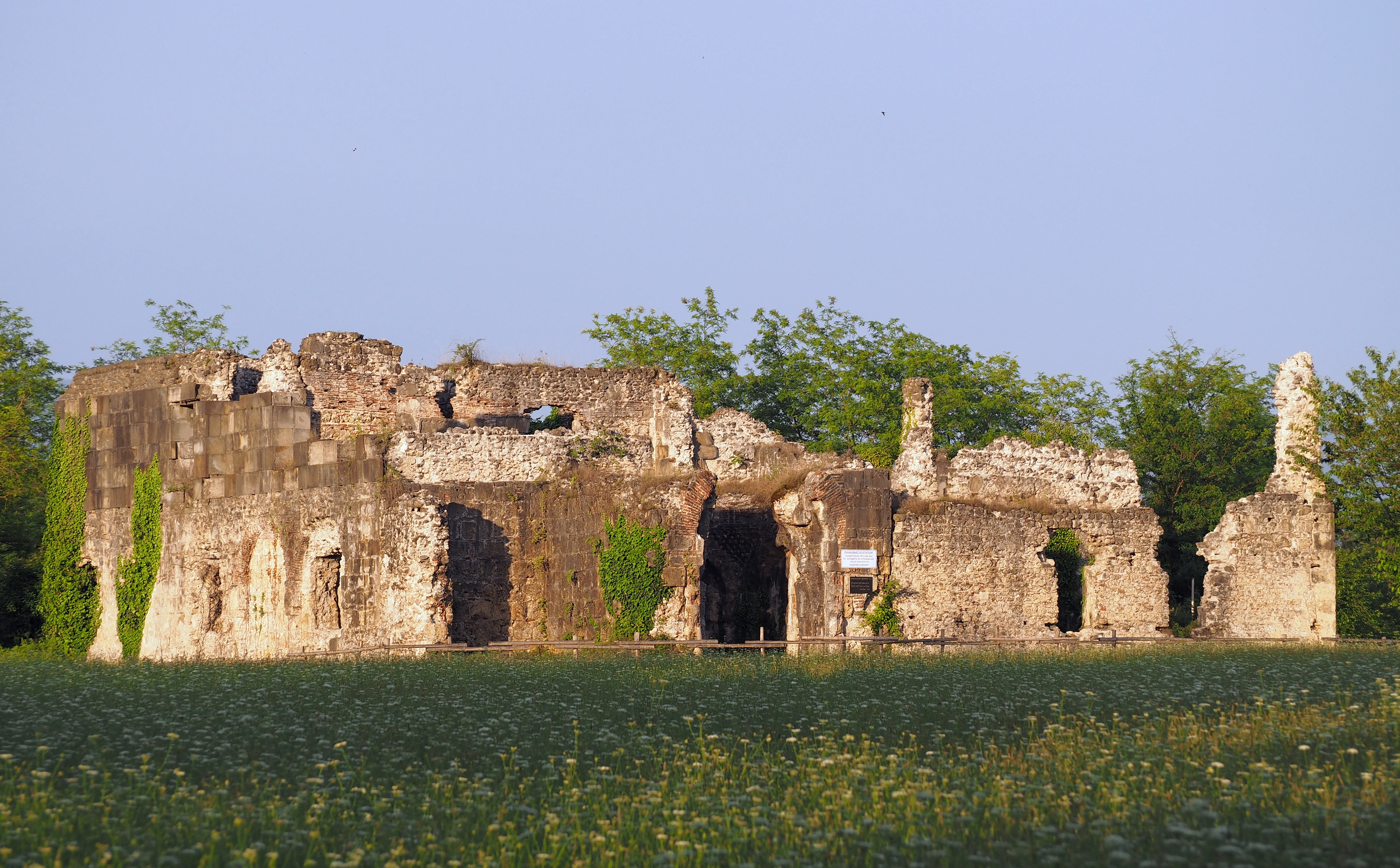
- Ruins of the Lykhny palace

- Location within Abkhazia Location within Georgia
- 43°8′20″N 40°37′07″E
- Location: (Georgia (country)) Gudauta Municipality, Autonomous Republic of Abkhazia, Georgia

Site notes
- Area: Gudauta Municipality

The Sharvashidze Palace (Georgian: შარვაშიძეების სასახლე, Abkhaz: Шарвашиӡераа раҳҭынра) is a ruined structure in the village of Lykhny, Gudauta District in Abkhazia/Georgia. The palace was constructed from 16th to the 19th century for Princes Sharvashidze, rulers of the Abkhazia.

== History ==
Palace was destroyed in the course of the revolt against the Russian Empire in 1866. The extant edifice is a remnant of a two-storey building built of limestone, sandstone, brick and other materials.

The Sharvashidze palace, built in the 16th or 17th century and reconstructed in the 19th—now in ruins—lies at the outskirts of the Lykhnashta, a large field in Lykhny, where an insurrection against the Russian rule erupted in July 1866. The rebellion was quelled by General Dmitry Sviatopolk-Mirsky, governor of Kutais, and the Sharvashidze palace was burned down in August 1866.

== Current condition ==
Georgia has inscribed the Sharvashidze Palace on its list of cultural heritage, but exercises no control over the territory. The current state of preservation of the monument is not known.
