= Gudauta =

Town in Abkhazia, Georgia

Gudauta გუდაუთა, Гәдоуҭа, Гудаута Gwdowtha
- town
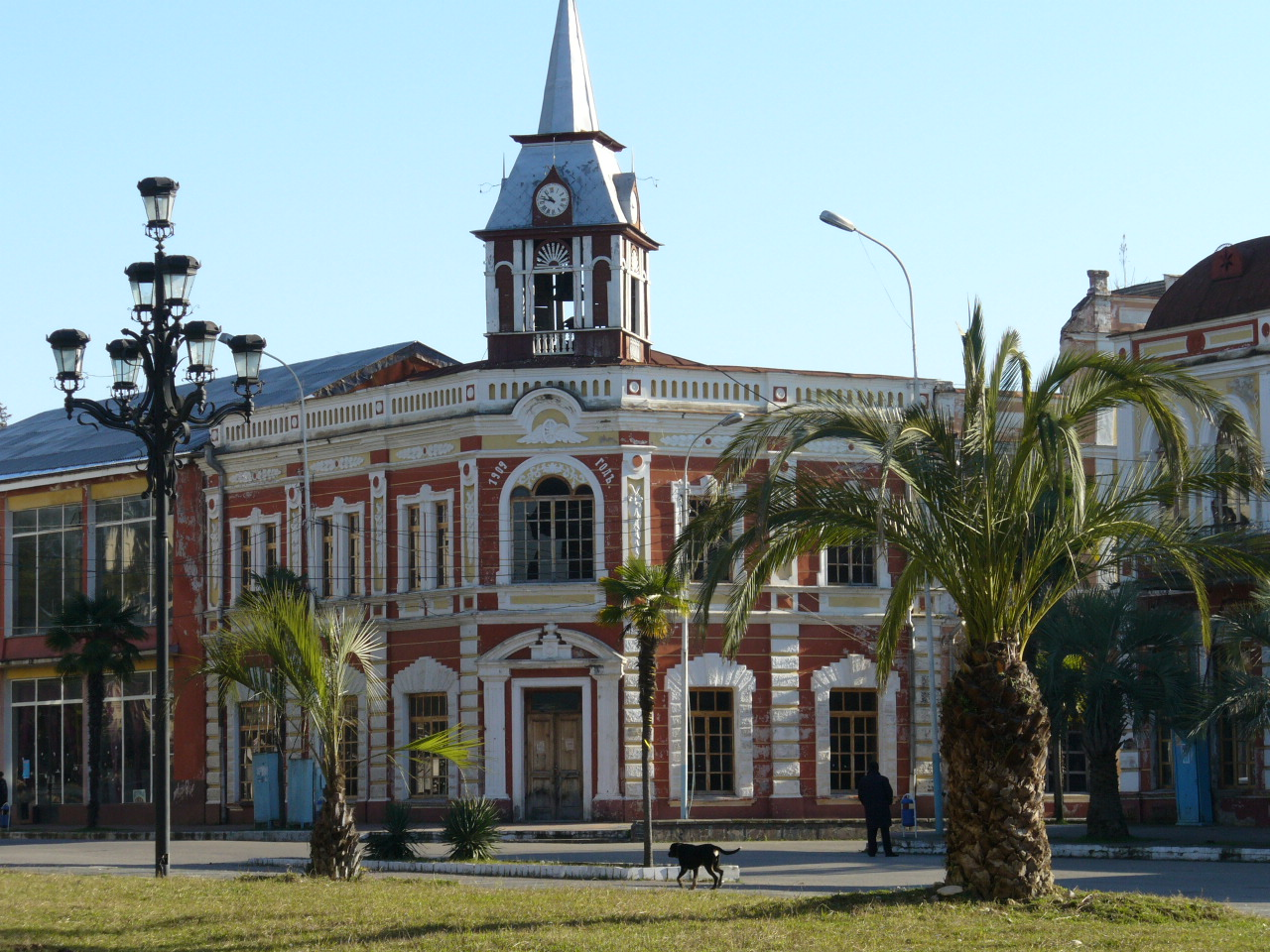
- View of Gudauta's centre

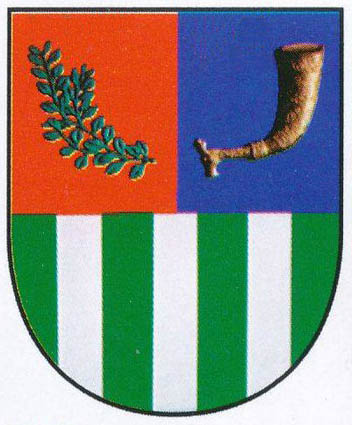
- Coat of arms

- Location of Gudauta within Abkhazia

- Location of Gudauta in Georgia Gudauta (Abkhazia)
- Coordinates: 43°06′7.16″N 40°37′29.28″E
- Country: Georgia
- Partially recognized independent country: Abkhazia
- District: Gudauta

Population (2011)
  - Total: 8,514
- Time zone: UTC+3 (MSK)
  - Summer (DST): UTC+4

Gudauta (Georgian: გუდაუთა, [ɡudautʰa]; Abkhaz: Гәдоуҭа, Gwdowtha; Russian: Гудаута, Gudauta) is a town in Abkhazia/Georgia, and the capital of the eponymous district. It is situated on the Black Sea, 37 km northwest of Sukhumi, the capital of Abkhazia. It is the namesake for the Gudauta Bay.

== History ==
A trade post of Genoa was located in Cavo de Buxo near modern Gudauta in the 13-15th centuries. Boxwood and hemp were exported to Europe via Cavo de Buxo.

== Air base ==
Gudauta used to be home to a Soviet Air Defence Forces base, Bombora airfield, where the 171st Guards Fighter Aviation Regiment flew Su-15TMs until 1982. The 171st Fighter Aviation Regiment was then transferred to Anadyr Ugolny Airport, Chukotka Autonomous Okrug. The 529th Fighter Aviation Regiment flew Su-27 'Flankers' from the base in the last years of the Cold War. This regiment was under the command of the 19th Army of the Air Defence Forces. Gudauta was a center of Abkhaz separatist resistance to Georgian government forces during the Georgian-Abkhaz conflict in 1992–1993.

Bombora airfield outside Gudauta later became home to a Soviet Airborne Forces unit, the 345th Independent Guards Airborne Regiment, later redesignated the 50th military base after the Soviet collapse, and then the 10th Independent Peacekeeping Airborne Regiment. The unit was subordinated directly to the Russian General Staff (earlier it used to be under the HQ of the Russian Airborne Forces).

In 1999, its equipment included 142 AIFV/APC (among them - 62 BMD-1 and 11 BMD-2); and 11 self-propelled artillery systems 2S9 "Nona-S".

The base has always been a significant factor in the Abkhaz conflict. The Georgian side and many Western independent observers claim the Gudauta base provided principal military support to Abkhaz rebels during the war in 1992–1993. In September 1995, Georgia had to legitimize Russian leases of three bases in the country, among them the Gudauta base.

At a summit of the Organization for Security and Co-operation in Europe (OSCE), in Istanbul in 1999, Russia agreed to shut down its base at Gudauta and to withdraw troops and equipment, pledging that henceforth it would be for the sole use of the CIS peacekeepers ("rehabilitation centre for peacekeeping troops"). However, Abkhaz authorities block OSCE inspection visits and no date is set for withdrawal from the base. Georgia still alleges that it is used to offer military support to the Abkhaz secessionists.

After the Russo-Georgian War in 2008, Russia recognized Abkhazia and signed with its government the treaty allowing Russia to keep its military base in Gudauta. The base is protected by S-300 air defense systems.

== Etymology ==
Гәдоу-ҭа: Гәдоу is a name of the river, ҭа is a locative suffix.

== International relations ==
=== Twin towns — Sister cities ===
Gudauta is twinned with the following city:

- Kineshma, Russia
