= Gudauta District =

Gudauta District გუდაუთის რაიონი Гәдоуҭа араион Гудаутский район
- District
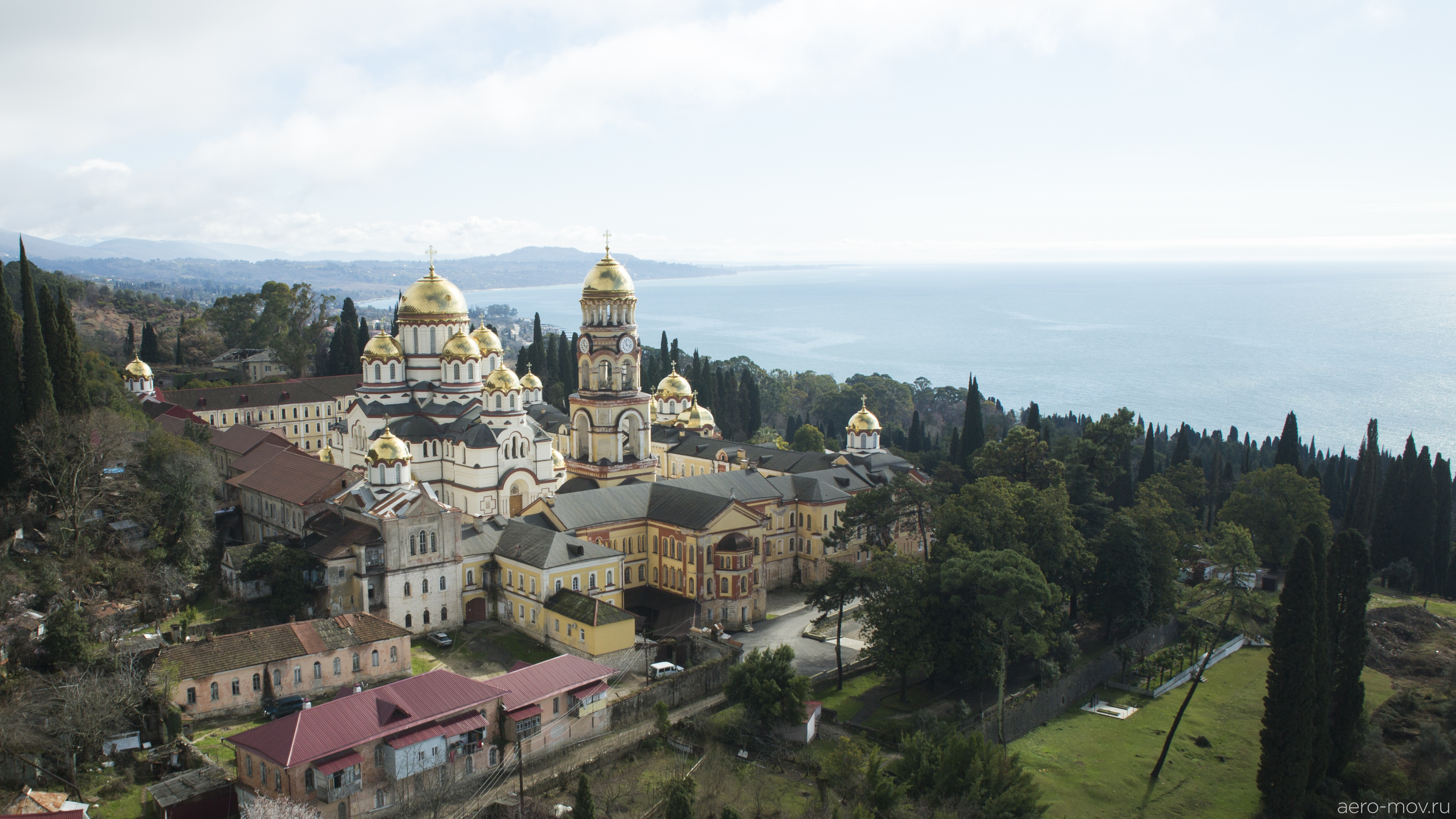
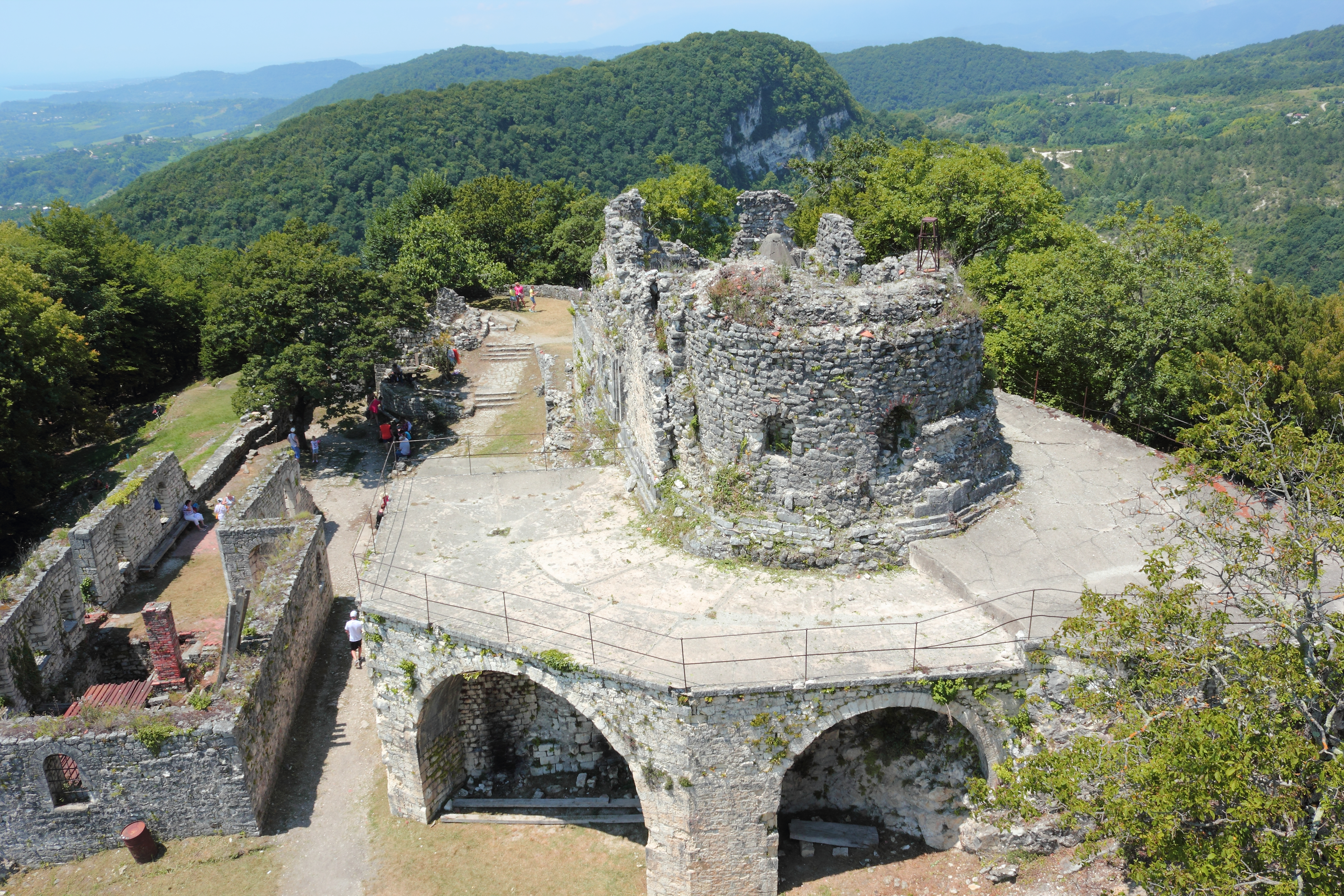
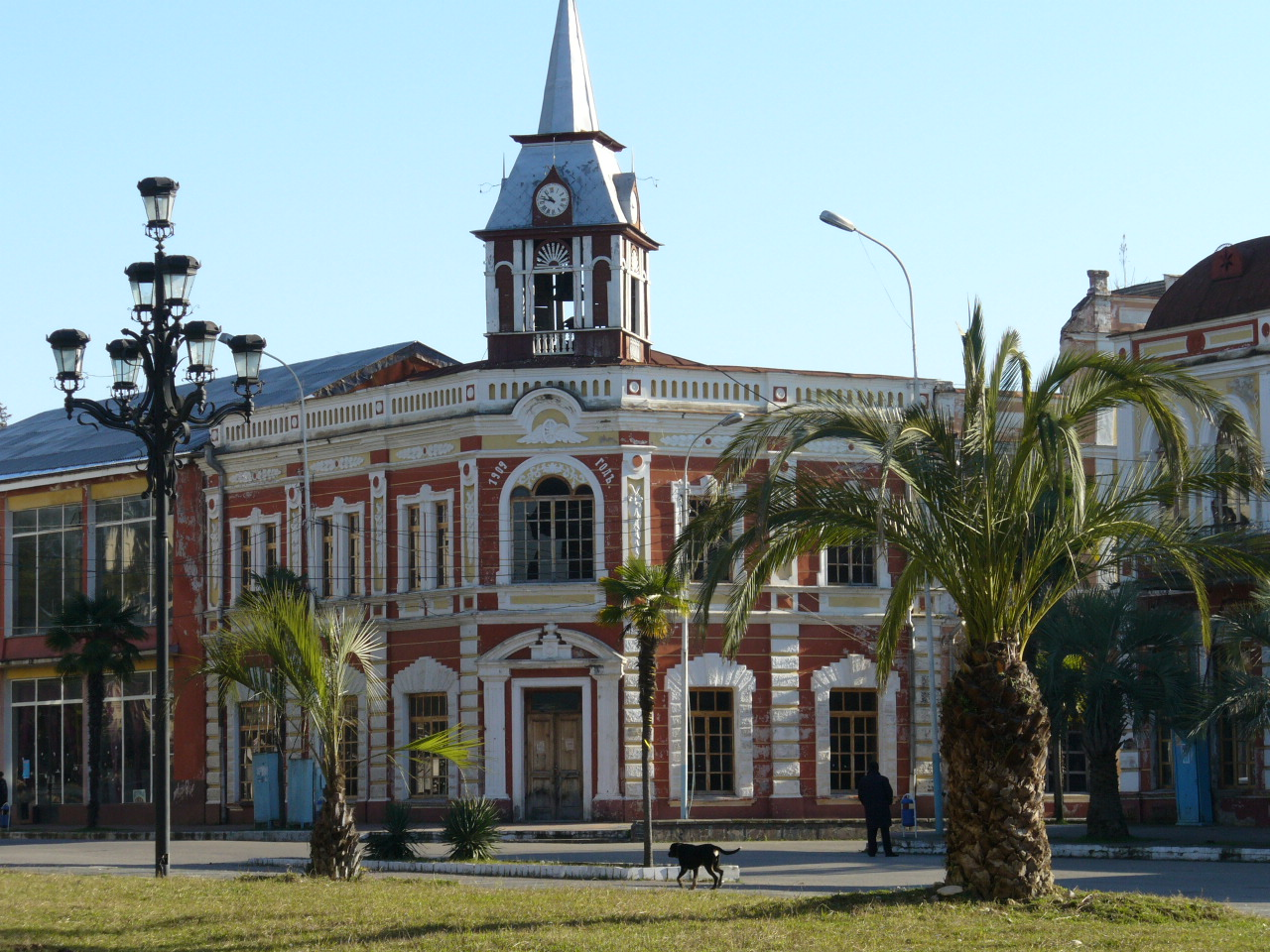
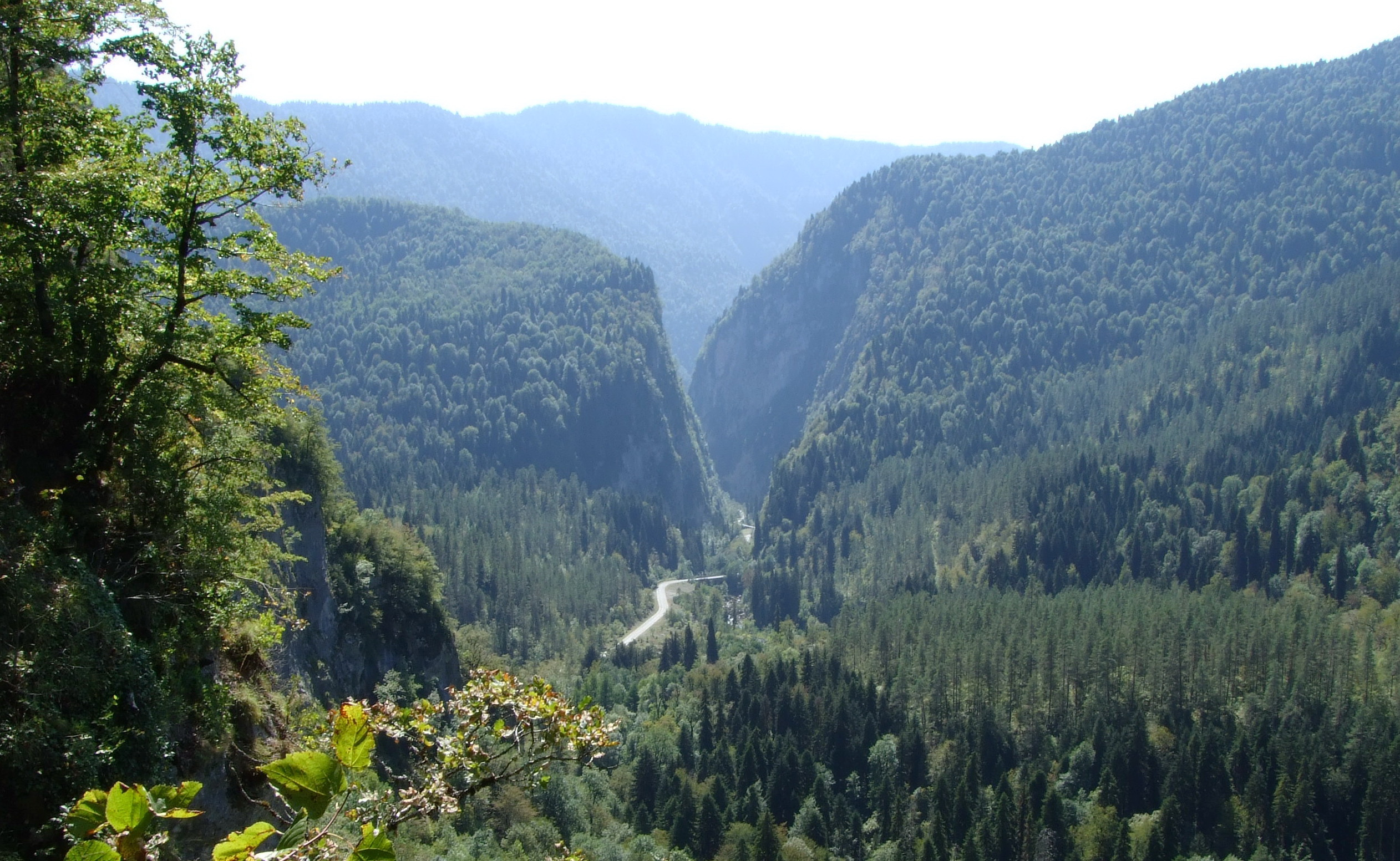
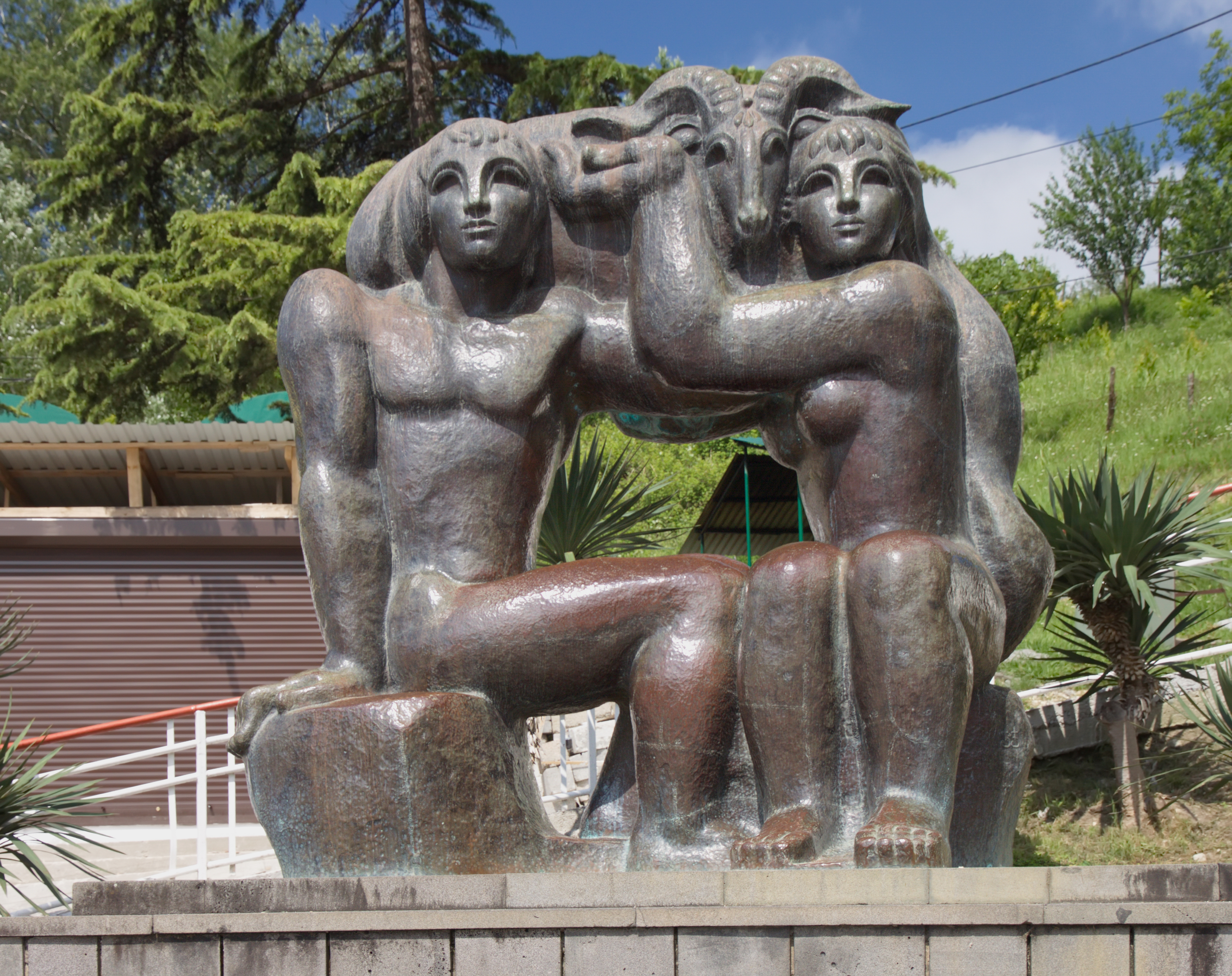
- From the top to bottom-right, New Athos, Anakopia Fortress, Gudauta, Stone Bag Gorge, New Athos Cave

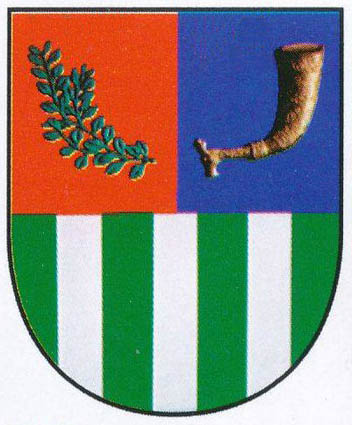
- Coat of arms
- Location of Gudauta District in Abkhazia (de facto bordering)
- Coordinates: 43°15′47″N 40°37′48″E
- Country: Georgia
- De Facto state: Abkhazia
- Capital: Gudauta

Government
  - Governor (de facto): Ruslan Ladaria

Area
  - Total: 1,640 km^{2} (630 sq mi)

Population (2018)
  - Total: 38,524
  - Density: 23.5/km^{2} (61/sq mi)
- Time zone: UTC+3 (MSK)

Gudauta District is a district of Abkhazia, Georgia's breakaway republic. It corresponds to the eponymous Georgian district. Its capital is Gudauta, the town by the same name. The population of the district was 34,869 at the time of the 2003 census, down from 57,334 in 1989. By the time of the 2011 Census, the population had increased to 36,775.

== Administration ==
Lev Shamba was reappointed as Administration Head on 10 May 2001 following the March 2001 local elections.

On 16 June 2003, President Vladislav Ardzinba assented to Shamba's request for dismissal and replaced him with First Deputy Minister for Education Beslan Dbar.

On 29 March 2005, newly elected President Sergei Bagapsh replaced Beslan Dbar as the Head of Gudauta's Administration by Daur Vozba. During the February 2011 assembly elections, Daur Vozba failed to be re-elected by a margin of 92 votes. Sergei Bagapsh appointed Valeri Malia as his successor on 23 February. On 17 February, during its first session, the new Gudauta District assembly elected Roman Bazba its chairman, with 22 out of 29 votes, and Fyodor Sakania its Deputy Chairman.

On 1 November 2011, Abkhazia's Prosecutor General announced that he had initiated criminal proceedings against former Administration Head Daur Vozba, for abuse of power. Vozba is alleged to have signed a decree on 11 August 2006, handing over two most valuable plots of coastal land to two individuals, which would have required authorisation by the Cabinet of Ministers.

Following the May 2014 Revolution and the election of Raul Khajimba as President, on 23 September 2014 he replaced Malia as Administration Head with Ruslan Ladaria.

=== List of Administration Heads ===
#	Name	Entered office	Left office	President	Comments
Chairmen of the (Executive Committee of the) District Soviet:
	Said Tarkil	1982	1987		
	I. Lakoba	<=1989	>=1989		
Heads of the District Administration:
	Said Tarkil	1994	26 November 1994		
	Said Tarkil	26 November 1994	1999	Vladislav Ardzinba	
	Lev Shamba	1999	16 June 2003	Vladislav Ardzinba	
	Beslan Dbar	16 June 2003	29 March 2005	Vladislav Ardzinba	
	Daur Vozba	29 March 2005	23 February 2011	Sergei Bagapsh	
	Valeri Malia	23 February 2011	26 September 2011	Sergei Bagapsh	
	Valeri Malia	26 September 2011	1 June 2014	Alexander Ankvab	
	Valeri Malia	1 June 2014	23 October 2014	Valeri Bganba	
	Ruslan Ladaria	23 October 2014	Present	Raul Khajimba	

== Demographics ==
At the time of the 2011 Census, Gudauta District had a population of 36,775:

- Abkhaz (81.9%)
- Armenians (10.0%)
- Russians (5.0%)
- Georgians (1.4%)
- Ukrainians (0.4%)
- Greeks (0.3%)

== Settlements ==
The district's main settlements are:

- Gudauta
- New Athos
- Lykhny

== Twin regions ==
On 20 September 2013, Gudauta District signed a Friendship and Partnership Agreement with Kstovsky District.

== See also ==
- Administrative divisions of Abkhazia
