= 3rd convocation of the People's Assembly of Abkhazia =

Legislative term in Abkhazia

The 3rd convocation of the People's Assembly of Abkhazia was in place from 2002 until 2007.

== Speaker, Vice Speakers and Committee Chairmen ==
The third convocation held its first session on 2 April 2002, led by its oldest member Ivan Zarandia and attended by Vice President Valeri Arshba. There were two candidates for Speaker, Nugzar Ashuba and Kesou Khagba. Ashuba was elected with 23 votes against ten (one vote was invalid). Parliament elected three Vice Speakers, one more than during the previous convocation: Konstantin Ozgan, Sergei Dbar and Aleksandr Stranichkin.

On 5 April, five committees and one commission were constituted. Ilia Gamisonia was elected head of the Committee for the Budget and Economic Policy, Vladimir Nachach-ogly head of the Committee for Legislation, Beslan Butba head of the Committee for Inter-Parliamentary and External Relations, Batal Khagush head of the Committee for Science, Education and Culture, Galust Trapizonyan head of the Committee for Social Policy and Emma Gamisonia head of the Commission for Human Rights. Upon the initiative of Vice Speaker Sergei Dbar, the constitution of the Committee for Defence and National Security was postponed until after the rerun in constituency No. 2. On 1 August, the winner of the rerun Garik Samanba was elected chairman of the Defence Committee.

On 10 March 2006, Vice Speaker Alexander Stranichkin was appointed Vice Premier. On 28 March, his successor was elected. Albert Ovsepyan, whose candidacy had been suggested by Stranichkin himself, defeated Galust Trapizonyan with 18 votes to 15.

== Factions ==
The 3rd convocation was the first convocation of the People's Assembly to form political factions. On 29 January 2003, 14 deputies formed the pro-government faction Republic, led by Temur Achugba. Its creation was criticised as divisive by some of the remaining deputies and a special session dedicated to discussing this development was held on 4 February.

The founding members of Republic were Achugba, Raji Avidzba, Vladimir Ashkhatsava, Marina Bartsyts, Aslan Bartsits, Viacheslav Vardania, Andzor Goov, Albert Kapikyan, Valeri Kandakov, Gennadi Nikitchenko, Konstantin Pilia, Viacheslav Sakania, Kesou Khagba and Tamaz Shonia. Emma Gamisonia's name was originally included in the list, but it became clear this had been done without her knowledge and against her will. Batal Khagush joined before December 2004. Other deputies later left the faction, Vardania on 29 April 2003, Kapikyan before February 2014 and Kandakov and Nikitchenko before December 2004. Most of its members supported outgoing Prime Minister Raul Khajimba in the October 2004 presidential election. On 16 December, following the Tangerine Revolution, Achugba stepped down as leader.

On 19 February 2004, 15 deputies formed the faction Unity, led by Daur Tarba. Its other members were Vardania, Kapikyan, Emma Gamisonia, Garri Samanba, Galust Trapizonyan, Iuri Kereselidze, Nugzar Agrba, Vitali Tarnava, Ilia Gamisonia, Vakhtang Pipia, Arkadi Jinjia, Beslan Butba, Vladimir Nachach-ogly and Albert Ovsepyan.

== By-elections ==
=== Constituency no. 13 ===
On 27 June 2002, newly elected Vice-Speaker Sergei Dbar died of a heart attack. The by-election for constituency No. 13 was held on 12 October. Candidates could be nominated until 12 September, while the registration period ran until 2 October. Two candidates were registered: Garri Aiba and Marina Bartsyts. The election was won by Bartsits.

=== Constituency no. 31 (first time) ===
A by-election was organised for 5 April 2003 in constituency No. 31 following the death of Anatoli Khashba. Three candidates were nominated by initiative groups: Tkvarcheli District Assembly Chairman Zaur Jinjolia, businessman and Executive Secretary of Apsny Nugzar Agrba and businessman David Chanchikov. The election was won by Agrba and he was registered as deputy on 9 April.

=== Constituencies no. 6 and 29 ===
On 11 March 2005, the parliamentary terms of Vakhtang Pipia and Daur Tarba were terminated, due to their being appointed Minister for Taxes and Fees and Chairman of the State Committee for Property and Privatisation, respectively. The by-elections in constituencies No. 6 and 29 were scheduled for 15 May.

There were three candidates in constituency No. 6: head of the association Inva-Assistance Valerian Tkhagushev received 666 votes (48.9%) Gulripshi District Head Adgur Kharazia 497 votes (36.5%) and Leonid Osia 170 votes (12.5%). Since none of the candidates received an absolute majority of the votes, a second round was held on 29 May, in which Tkhagushev defeated Kharazia by 966 (56%) votes to 722.

In constituency no. 29 there was only a single candidate running, Beslan Jopua.

=== Constituency no. 31 (second time) ===
On 25 September 2005, a by-election was held in constituency No. 31 in Tkvarcheli, to replace Nugzar Agrba who was appointed to a government post. Jambulat Arshba was elected with 906 out of 923 votes, the total number of registered voters was 2079.

=== Constituency no. 7 ===
On 10 March 2006, Alexander Stranichkin was appointed Vice Premier by President Bagapsh. On 19 April, the Central Election Commission announced that the by-election in constituency No. 7 would be held on 4 June. The Central Election Commission registered three candidates: Suren Kerselyan, Iakub Lakoba and Pavel Leshchuk. None of the candidates achieved an absolute majority in the first round, and so a second round was held on 26 August, in which Leshchuk defeated Lakoba with 752 (64%) against 368 votes. Leshchuk was officially registered as deputy on 11 September.

== List of Members ==
#	Constituency	Name	Affiliation	Position	Notes
1	Sukhumi	Vladimir Ashkhatsava	Republic		
2	Sukhumi	Garik Samanba	Unity	Chairman of the Committee for Defence and National Security (since 1 August 2002)	
3	Sukhumi	Emma Gamisonia	Unity	Chairman of the Commission for Human Rights	
4	Sukhumi	Batal Arshba			
5	Sukhumi	Konstantin Pilia	Republic		
6	Sukhumi	Vakhtang Pipia	Unity		Until 11 March 2005 due to appointment as Minister for Taxes and Fees
6	Sukhumi	Valerian Tkhagushev			Elected on 29 May 2005
7	Sukhumi	Aleksandr Stranichkin		Vice Speaker	Until 10 March 2006 due to appointment as Vice Premier
7	Sukhumi	Pavel Leshchuk			Since 11 September 2006
8	Pitsunda	Slava Sakania	Republic		
9	Bzyb	Batal Khagush	Republic (since 2003 or 2004)	Chairman of the Committee for Science, Education and Culture	
10	Gagra	Vitali Tarnava	Unity		
11	Gagra	Valeri Kondakov	Republic (until 2003 or 2004)		
12	Gantiadi	Albert Ovsepyan	Unity	Vice Speaker since March 2006	
13	Otkhura	Sergei Dbar		Vice Speaker	Died on 27 June 2002
13	Otkhura	Marina Bartsyts	Republic		Elected on 12 October 2002
14	Duripsh	Kesou Khagba	Republic		
15	Lykhny	Konstantin Ozgan		Vice Speaker	
16	Gudauta	Vladimir Nachach-ogly	Unity	Chairman of the Committee for Legislation	
17	Aatsin	Viacheslav Tsugba			
18	New Athos	Aslan Bartsits	Republic		
19	Eshera	Andzor Goov	Republic		
20	Gumista	Galust Trapizonyan	Unity	Chairman of the Committee for Social Policy	
21	Besleti	Teimuraz Achugba	Republic (chairman until 16 December 2004)		
22	Pshap	Albert Kapikyan	Republic (until 2003 or 2004)		
22	Pshap	Albert Kapikyan	Unity		
23	Machara	Gennadi Nikitchenko	Republic (until 2003 or 2004)		
24	Dranda	Raji Avidzba	Republic		
25	Beslakhuba	Arkadi Jinjia	Unity		
26	Chlou	Beslan Butba	Unity	Chairman of the Committee for Inter-Parliamentary and External Relations	
27	Kutoli	Nugzar Ashuba		Speaker	
28	Atara	Valeri Zantaria			
29	Ochamchire	Daur Tarba	Unity (chairman)		Until 11 March 2005 due to appointment as Chairman of the State Committee for Property and Privatisation
29	Ochamchire	Beslan Jopua			Elected on 15 May 2005
30	Tkvarcheli	Ilia Gamisonia	Unity	Chairman of the Committee for the Budget and Economy Policy	
31	Tkvarcheli	Arkadi Khashba			Until 2003
31	Tkvarcheli	Nugzar Agrba	Unity		Since 9 April 2003, until 2005
31	Tkvarcheli	Jambulat Arshba			Elected on 25 September 2005
32	Uakum	Ivan Zarandia			
33	Chuburkhinji	Iuri Kereselidze	Unity		
34	Gali	Viacheslav Vardania	Republic (until 29 April 2003)		
34	Gali	Viacheslav Vardania	Unity		
35	Shashikvar	Tamaz Shonia	Republic (until 2003 or 2004)		
