= 2002 Abkhazian parliamentary election =

- 2 March 2002
- All 35 seats in the People's Assembly; 18 seats needed for a majority
Party	Leader	Seats	+/–
Independents / Initiative Groups		35	0
This lists parties that won seats. See the complete results below.

Parliamentary elections were held in Abkhazia on 2 March 2002 to elect the third convocation of the People's Assembly. The elections had originally been scheduled for 24 November 2001, but had to be postponed due to the October 2001 Chechen incursion into the lower Kodori Valley. Candidates supporting President Vladislav Ardzinba won all 35 seats.

== Campaign ==
All candidates were nominated by initiative groups. Initially, 106 initiative groups registered with the Central Election Commission, but only 100 completed the necessary paperwork. Of the 100 nominated candidates, only 89 agreed to run. The Central Election Commission refused to register fourteen candidates on the ground that some of their collected signatures were supposedly forged, seven of which appealed the decision with the Supreme Court. In four cases, the court confirmed the Commission's decision, while in the cases of outgoing Vice Speaker Ruslan Kharabua, Givi Gabnia and Anatoli Khashba, it ordered further investigation by experts. The court eventually ruled in favour of Khashba, and he was registered as a candidate.

On 26 February, Aitaira held an extraordinary congress at which it called for the elections to be declared invalid and for new elections to be organised at a later date, due to various violations favouring pro-government candidates and the refusal of the Central Election Commission to register eight of its candidates. In contrast, Apsny and Amtsakhara called for the elections to go through as planned. Fourteen candidates withdrew in protest: Irina Agrba, Izida Chania, Iakub Lakoba, Dalila Pilia, Viktor Bartsyts, Vadim Smyr, Leonid Lakerbaia, Roman Geria, Zurab Otyrba, Appolon Shinkuba, Oleg Damenia, Valeri Bigvava, Gennadi Alamia and Natella Akaba. In addition, Vladimir Mukba withdrew for family reasons and Aiba Azaret in favour of Sergei Dbar.

Following the withdrawal of these sixteen candidates, 63 candidates contested the 35 constituencies, with twelve constituencies only having a single candidate; eighteen constituencies had two candidates and five constituencies had three. The candidates included 45 Abkhazians, seven Russians, five Armenians, three Georgians, one Greek, one Kabardian and one Cherkessian. Four were women.

== Conduct ==
Ethnic Georgians displaced during the conflict were prevented from voting, whilst state radio and television supported pro-government candidates.

The Central Election Commission was subordinated to the Cabinet of Ministers and the procedures it implemented did not correspond to election law — the period for collecting signatures was too short and the forms did not allow for surplus signatures to compensate for any that might be disqualified. Voter lists contained people that had died or emigrated and double entries at two places of residence. Observers reported pressure on local administrations and voters.

== Results ==
Preliminary turnout was 61.2%. The elections were decided in the first round in 30 out of 35 constituencies. Among the elected deputies were 21 Abkhaz, three Georgians, three Armenians, two Russians and one Kabardin. None of the female candidates was elected in the first round. Outgoing Speaker Sokrat Jinjolia lost the election in constituency no. 31.

In constituencies no. 3, 4, 5 and 11, no candidate achieved a first round majority and a second round was held on 16 March.

Central Election Commission Chairman Sergei Smyr claimed that in constituency no. 2, a number of residents had put pressure on voters to abstain. Later, Smyr declared that while the local election commission deemed the election to have been invalid, the Central Election Commission disagreed, and so the matter was brought before the Supreme Court.

**Results of the 2002 Abkhazian parliamentary elections** by constituency (vertical); Italics = incumbent, **bold** = winner
#	Winner	Losing candidates		Withdrawn	
**1**	Vladimir Ashkhatsara			Irina Agrba	
**2**		Garik Samanba	Leonid Osia		
**3**	Emma Gamisonia			Izida Chania	Iakub Lakoba
**4**	Batal Arshba				
**5**	Konstantin Pilia				
**6**	Vakhtang Pipia			Dalila Pilia	
**7**	Aleksandr Stranichkin				
**8**	Slava Sakania				
**9**	Batal Khagush			Viktor Bartsyts	Vadim Smyr
**10**	Vitali Tarnava				
**11**	Valeri Kondakov			Vladimir Mukba	
**12**	Albert Ovsepyan				
**13**	Sergei Dbar			Aiba Azaret	
**14**	Kesou Khagba			Leonid Lakerbaia	
**15**	Konstantin Ozgan			Roman Geria	
**16**	Vladimir Nachach-ogly				
**17**	Viacheslav Tsugba			Zurab Otyrba	
**18**	Aslan Bartsits				
**19**	Anzor Goov				
**20**	Galust Trapizonyan				
**21**	Teimuraz Achugba				
**22**	Albert Kapikyan				
**23**	Gennadi Nikitchenko				
**24**	Raji Avidzba			Appolon Shinkuba	
**25**	Arkadi Jinjia			Oleg Damenia	
**26**	Beslan Butba			Valeri Bigvava	
**27**	Nugzar Ashuba				
**28**	Valeri Zantaria				
**29**	Daur Tarba			Gennadi Alamia	
**30**	Ilia Gamisonia				
**31**	Anatoli Khashba	Sokrat Jinjolia			
**32**	Ivan Zarandia				
**33**	Iuri Kereselidze				
**34**	Viacheslav Vardania				
**35**	Tamaz Shonia				

== Rerun in constituency no. 2 ==
The repeated election in constituency no. 2 was originally planned for 18 May, but on 1 May the Central Election Commission decided to postpone it to 23 June, to give candidate Leonid Osia more time to prepare after he lost his court case against the decision to repeat the election. Nonetheless, only Garik Samanba participated in the rerun.
