= List of political parties in Abkhazia =

This article lists political parties and socio-political movements in the partially recognised Republic of Abkhazia. Abkhazia has a multi-party system. Political parties tend to not have stable ideological platforms, and as such, party actions and support tend to depend on the attitudes/beliefs of the party leader.

The current coalition is formed by United Abkhazia, Amtsakhara and Aitaira.

== Political parties ==
There are ten political parties in Abkhazia, two of which are represented in the People's Assembly.

Party	Ideology	Political position	Leader	Current deputies
Amtsakhara	Russophilia		Alkhas Kvitsinia	4 / 35
Aitaira	Anti-Khajimba		Leonid Lakerbaia	1 / 35
Forum for the National Unity of Abkhazia	Nationalism	Right-wing	Daur Arshba	0 / 35
United Abkhazia	Social conservatism	Centre-right	Sergei Shamba	0 / 35
Party for the Economic Development of Abkhazia	Social liberalism	Centre	Beslan Butba	0 / 35
Ainar	Direct democracy	Right-wing	Tengiz Jopua	0 / 35
Communist Party of Abkhazia	Communism	Far-left	Bebiya Bakur	0 / 35
People's Party of Abkhazia	Patriotism	Centre	Iakub Lakoba	0 / 35
Apsny	Liberalism	Centre	Givi Gabniya	0 / 35
Social-Democratic Party of Abkhazia	Social democracy	Centre-left	Gennady Alamia	0 / 35

=== Movements ===
Furthermore, there is a number of socio-political movements:

- Aidgylara
- Aiaaira
- Akhatsa
- Movement of the Mothers of Abkhazia for Peace and Social Justice
- Russian Citizens Union
- Union of the Defenders of Abkhazia
- The Armenian community of Abkhazia

== External links of other parties ==
- Coalition for a Democratic Abkhazia

== See also ==
- List of political parties in Georgia
- List of political parties in South Ossetia
- Lists of political parties
