= 4th convocation of the People's Assembly of Abkhazia =

Legislative term in Abkhazia

The 4th convocation of the People's Assembly of Abkhazia was in place from 2007 until 2012.

== Speaker and Vice Speakers ==
The first session of the 4th convocation of the People's Assembly was held on 3 April 2007. It was opened by the oldest deputy, Vladimir Nachach and attended by President Sergei Bagapsh, Vice President Raul Khajimba, Prime Minister Alexander Ankvab, Supreme Court Head Rauf Korua, Arbitration Court Head A. Gurjua, the deputies of the previous convocation, the members of the Cabinet and regional Administration Heads.

During the first session, Nugzar Ashuba was re-elected to the position of speaker with 26 votes. He had been nominated by Vladimir Nachach, he defeated Adgur Kharazia who had been nominated by Rita Lolua.

The number of Vice Speakers was expanded from two to three. For the first position, Nugzar Ashuba nominated Viacheslav Tsugba for re-election, and Batal Kobakhia Irina Agrba, arguing that it was time for a woman to be elected. Parliament then accepted a legislative amendment proposed by President Bagapsh allowing for a total number of three Vice Speakers, so that both could be elected. For the third position, Albert Ovsepyan was nominated for re-election by Valeri Kondakov, while opposition member Adgur Kharazia nominated Sergei Matosyan. After a heated debate and President Bagapsh expressing his support for Ovsepyan, the latter was re-elected with 19 votes.

On 3 May 2010, Albert Ovsepyan retired as Vice Speaker on account of old age. On 24 September, Sergei Matosyan was elected Vice Speaker in his stead.

== Changes in composition ==
On 10 June 2008 deputy Omar Kvarchia suddenly died. The resulting by-election was won by Emma Gamsonia. On 1 November 2010 Yuri Kereselidze died, on 9 January 2011 Ruslan Kishmaria was elected his successor.

On 8 February, Vladimir Nachach died after a long illness. On 9 March the Central Election Commission decided that the by-election to elect Nachach's successor would be held on 30 April, that formations who wished to nominate a candidate had to register between 11 and 31 March, and that candidates could be nominated between 31 March and 20 April. Three candidates were nominated, all three by initiative groups: Kherson Dashelia, Zaur Avidzba and Said Argun. The by-election was won by Zaur Avidzba with 1028 votes, Said Argun came second with 753 votes and Kherson Dashelia third with 166 votes.

On 9 November 2011, Beslan Jopua's term as MP was terminated due to his appointment as Minister for Agriculture on 18 October by newly elected President Alexander Ankvab.

== List of Members ==
#	Constituency	Name	Affiliation	Position	Notes
1	Sukhumi	Talikh Khvatysh			
2	Sukhumi	Sener Gogua		Chairman of the Committee for Relations with Compatriots	
3	Sukhumi	Rita Lolua			
4	Sukhumi	Batal Kobakhia		Chairman of the Committee for Human Rights and the Rule of Law	
5	Sukhumi	Lev Shamba	Communist Party of Abkhazia	Chairman of the Committee for Agriculture, Land Use, Natural Resources and Ecology	
6	Sukhumi	Irina Agrba		Vice Speaker	
7	Sukhumi	Pavel Leshchuk		Chairman of the Committee for Economic Policy and Entrepreneurship	
8	Pitsunda	Roman Benia			
9	Bzyb	Valeri Bganba			
10	Gagra	Amra Agrba			
11	Gagra	Valery Kondakov	Communist Party of Abkhazia		
12	Gantiadi	Valery Mayromyan			
13	Otkhura	Garik Samanba		Chairman of the Committee for Defence and National Security	
14	Duripsh	Guram Gumba		Chairman of the Committee for Inter-Parliamentary and Foreign Affairs	
15	Lykhny	Mikhail Sangulia			
16	Gudauta	Vladimir Emin-ipa Nachach	Communist Party of Abkhazia	Chairman of the Committee for Legislation, Judicial Reform and State Building	Died on 8 February 2011
16	Gudauta	Zaur Avidzba			Elected in by-election on 30 April 2011
17	Aatsin	Viacheslav Mikhail-ipa Tsygba	Communist Party of Abkhazia	Vice Speaker	
18	New Athos	Vitali Smyr			
19	Eshera	Lev Avidzba			
20	Gumista	Albert Ovsepyan		Vice Speaker until 3 May 2010	
21	Besleti	Valeri Kvarchia		Chairman of the Committee for Education, Science, Culture and Youth and Sport Affairs	
22	Pshap	Sergei Matosyan		Vice Speaker since 24 September 2010	
23	Machara	Viktor Vasilyev			
24	Dranda	Adgur Rafet-ipa Kharazia		Chairman of the Committee for Local Government	
25	Beslakhuba	Yuri Zukhba			
26	Chlou	Zaur Adleiba			
27	Kutoli	Nugzar Nuri-ipa Ashuba		Speaker	
28	Atara	Temur Kvitsinia			
29	Ochamchire	Beslan Jopua	Communist Party of Abkhazia	Chairman of the Committee for Social Policy, Family, Health and Labour	Released on 9 November 2011 due to appointment as Agriculture Minister
30	Tkvarcheli	Daur Arshba			
31	Tkvarcheli	Aleksandr Chengelia			
32	Uakum	Omar Kvarchia		Chairman of the Committee for the Budget, Credit Institutions, Taxes and Finance	Died on 10 June 2008
32	Uakum	Emma Gamisonia			Elected in by-election
33	Chuburkhinji	Yuri Kereselidze			Died on 1 November 2010
33	Chuburkhinji	Ruslan Kishmaria			Elected in by-election on 9 January 2011
34	Gali	Viacheslav Vardania			
35	Shashikvar	Bezhan Ubiria			
