= 2011 Abkhazian presidential election =

← 2009	26 August 2011	2014 →
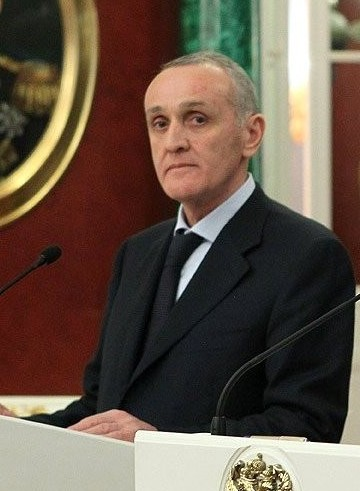

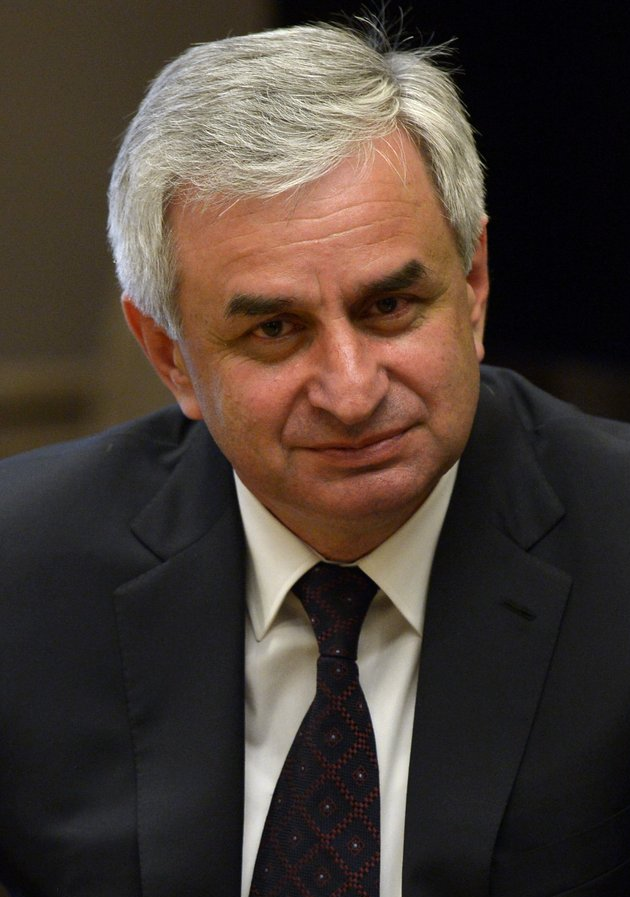
Candidate	Alexander Ankvab	Sergei Shamba	Raul Khajimba
Party	Aitaira	PEDA	FNUA
Running mate	Mikhail Logua	Shamil Adzynba	Svetlana Jergenia
Popular vote	58,657	22,456	21,177
Percentage	56.23%	21.53%	20.30%
President before election
Alexander Ankvab (acting)
Aitaira
Elected President
Alexander Ankvab
Aitaira

Presidential elections were held in Abkhazia on 26 August 2011. This was the fifth such election since the post of President of the Republic of Abkhazia was created in 1994. The election was held to elect the successor of president Sergei Bagapsh who died in office on 29 May 2011.

== Background ==
The election was originally scheduled to take place in 2014, five years after the previous election; however, the Constitution of Abkhazia required an election to be held within three months after the unexpected death of incumbent president Sergei Bagapsh on 29 May. On 8 June the People's Assembly set the election date for 26 August. The MPs decided against earlier dates such as 20 August, which is immediately after the summer holidays, as the election is largely organised by teachers and to allow for repairs to school buildings to be completed, where many polling stations are located.

=== Requirements and registration procedure ===
According to the Law on the Election of the President of the Republic of Abkhazia, candidates for the Presidency have to:

- possess Abkhazian citizenship;
- be of Abkhaz ethnicity;
- be fluent in the Abkhaz language;
- be no younger than 35 and no older than 65 years of age;
- be eligible to vote;
- have permanently lived in Abkhazia for the last five years up to the election day.

Prospective candidates have to be nominated between 27 June and 17 July. This can be done either by an initiative group of at least 10 people with a list of between 2000 and 2500 signatures, or by a political party registered with the Central Election Commission. The only parties registered in this way are United Abkhazia, the Forum of the National Unity of Abkhazia, the Party of the Economic Development of Abkhazia, the People's Party and the Communist Party. After the nomination period ends, the Central Election Commission will verify the signature lists and whether candidates satisfy the set requirements. To test the nominees' proficiency in Abkhaz, it has established a language commission. Registration of the candidates has to be completed before 27 July and two days after their registration the Central Election Commission has to make public the list of nominees whose candidacy had been approved.

== Candidates ==
All three candidates who were nominated for the election successfully completed their registration: Acting President Alexander Ankvab, Prime Minister Sergei Shamba and opposition leader Raul Khajimba. Following their nomination, Shamba and his vice presidential candidate, Shamil Adzynba, as well as Khajimba and his running mate Svetlana Jergenia applied for registration on 16 July. Ankvab and his vice presidential candidate Mikhail Logua filed their application on 17 July. The three presidential candidates passed their Abkhaz language test on 20 July 2011. All candidates were registered by the CEC on 25 July and received their certificates on 26 July.

Presidential candidate	Career	Vice presidential candidate	Career	Political support
	Vice President (2005–2009); Prime Minister (2003–2004); Minister of Defence (2002–2003)		Widow of first President Vladislav Ardzinba	Nominated by an initiative group (28 June); 2009 presidential candidate Zaur Ardzinba (28 June); Nominated by the Forum for National Unity (16 July); Akhatsa (5 July); Aruaa (7 July); Former prime minister and 2004 presidential candidate Anri Jergenia (27 July); Union of Cossacks (5 August)
Raul Khajimba	Vice President (2005–2009); Prime Minister (2003–2004); Minister of Defence (2002–2003)	Svetlana Jergenia	Widow of first President Vladislav Ardzinba	Nominated by an initiative group (28 June); 2009 presidential candidate Zaur Ardzinba (28 June); Nominated by the Forum for National Unity (16 July); Akhatsa (5 July); Aruaa (7 July); Former prime minister and 2004 presidential candidate Anri Jergenia (27 July); Union of Cossacks (5 August)
	Acting President (since 29 May 2011); Vice President (2010–2011); Prime Minister (2005–2010); Businessman		Governor of Gulripshi District	Nominated by an initiative group (29 June); United Abkhazia (22 July); Amtsakhara (2 August)
Alexander Ankvab	Acting President (since 29 May 2011); Vice President (2010–2011); Prime Minister (2005–2010); Businessman	Mikhail Logua	Governor of Gulripshi District	Nominated by an initiative group (29 June); United Abkhazia (22 July); Amtsakhara (2 August)
	Prime Minister (since 13 February 2010); Minister for Foreign Affairs (1997–2004 and 2004–2010)		Deputy Chairman of the committee for Youth Affairs and Sport	Nominated by an initiative group (8 July); Party for Economic Development (21 July); 10 (out of 12) members of the Association of Youth Organisations (28 July); Communist Party (9 August)
Sergei Shamba	Prime Minister (since 13 February 2010); Minister for Foreign Affairs (1997–2004 and 2004–2010)	Shamil Adzynba	Deputy Chairman of the committee for Youth Affairs and Sport	Nominated by an initiative group (8 July); Party for Economic Development (21 July); 10 (out of 12) members of the Association of Youth Organisations (28 July); Communist Party (9 August)

== Campaign ==
The election campaign official began when the candidates received their registration certificates on 26 July. According to election law, Alexander Ankvab and Sergei Shamba had to take leave from their offices. Correspondingly, Parliament Speaker Nugzar Ashuba temporarily took over as Acting President and Vice-Premier Beslan Kubrava as Prime Minister.

On 19 July, the League of Voters "For Fair Elections" held its first press conference to announce that it would monitor the upcoming election as in previous years.

Shamba's campaign was led by Beslan Eshba.

=== Media use ===
==== TV broadcasts ====
Each presidential candidate received three hours of free air time on national state television in the four weeks running up to election day, and each Vice Presential candidate one hour. During the first week, candidates had the choice between an hour of live interaction with voters and sending in a pre-recorded DVD. In the second week, the candidates, alone or assisted by no more than four associates, received one hour of live interaction with voters. In the third and fourth weeks, first the vice-presidential candidate and then the presidential candidates had the opportunity to answer alternatingly questions from voters and from officially registered media.

Apart from these broadcasts, each candidate could send in commercials up to five minutes, which were broadcast on weekdays between 1 and 25 August, three times daily (8:00, 18:00 and 20:00).

The order in which the broadcasts of candidates appeared was determined by draw, and was as follows:

	Monday	Tuesday	Wednesday	Thursday	Friday	Order of commercials
Week 1 (1–5 August)	Khajimba		Shamba		Ankvab	Khajimba – Ankvab – Shamba
Week 2 (8–12 August)	Khajimba		Shamba		Ankvab	Khajimba – Shamba – Ankvab
Week 3 (15–19 August)	Logua		Jergenia		Adzynba	Ankvab – Khajimba – Shamba
Week 4 (22–26 August)	Shamba	Khajimba	Ankvab			Ankvab – Shamba – Khajimba

== Opinion polls ==
Date	Source	Sergei Shamba	Alexander Ankvab	Raul Khajimba
5–12 July 2011	Dobrososedstvo	30.1%	26.1%	8.0%

- Opinion polling

== Results ==
The CEC decided that in order to reduce costs and simplify the organisation of the election, there would be no separate polling stations and precinct election commissions for military units. Instead, it sent a letter to the Ministry of Defence requesting that soldiers should receive leave ten days before the election, allowing them to collect absentee ballots and thus vote in a polling station of their choosing.

According to the Abkhazian electoral commission, preliminary results showed a first round victory for Ankvab over Shamba and Khajimba.

The official results, released on 27 August, showed only small differences, and Alexander Ankvab was elected in the first round. He is to be sworn in on 26 September.

Candidate	Party	Votes	%
Alexander Ankvab	Aitaira	58,657	56.23
Sergei Shamba	Party for the Economic Development of Abkhazia	22,456	21.53
Raul Khajimba	Forum for the National Unity of Abkhazia	21,177	20.30
Against all		2,023	1.94
Total		104,313	100.00
Valid votes		104,313	97.63
Invalid/blank votes		2,532	2.37
Total votes		106,845	100.00
Registered voters/turnout		148,556	71.92
Source: Ministry of Foreign Affairs
