= Sergei Matosyan =

Armenian-Abkhazian colonel and politician

Sergei Vladimirovich Matosyan
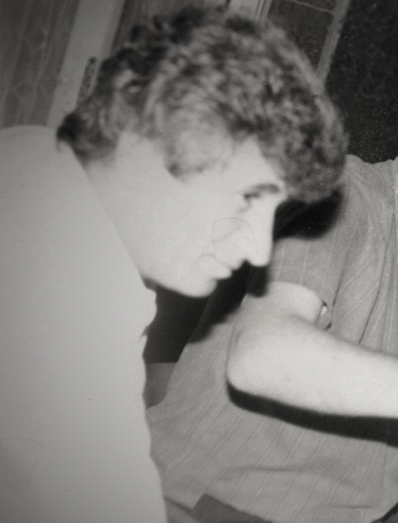
- Matosyan in 1993

Vice Speaker of the People's Assembly of Abkhazia
- In office 24 September 2010 – 2012
- Preceded by: Albert Ovsepyan
- Succeeded by: Adgur Kharazia; Otari Tsvizhba; Emma Gamisonia; Vagarshak Kosyan

Personal details
- Born: July 22, 1952 (age 73) Gagra, Abkhazian ASSR, Soviet Union
- Awards: Hero of Abkhazia

Military service
- Allegiance: Abkhazia
- Branch/service: Abkhazian Armed Forces
- Years of service: 1992–1994
- Rank: Colonel
- Commands: Bagramyan Battalion
- Battles/wars: War in Abkhazia (1992–1993)

Sergei Vladimirovich Matosyan (Russian: Сергей Владимирович Матосян; Abkhaz: Сергеи Владимир-иԥа Матосиан) is an Armenian-Abkhazian colonel and opposition politician. He became the Deputy Speaker of the People's Assembly of Abkhazia in 2010, and is a former Minister.

== Military career ==
Matosyan participated in the 1992–1993 war with Georgia, holding the rank of colonel and heading three battalions. In 1994, Matosyan headed the Bagramyan Battalion during the Lata operation in the Kodori Valley. He was the only Armenian to command Abkhaz troops during the war. For his achievements, Matosyan was awarded the title Hero of Abkhazia. After the war, Matosyan became head of the republican border guard.

== Political career ==
Matosyan was first elected to the People's Assembly of Abkhazia in 1996, which he left in 2000 to become Deputy Minister for the Interior responsible for staffing.

During the 4 October 2004 Presidential election, Matosyan supported Sergei Shamba's candidacy, and he was one of the leaders of his Social-Democratic Party.

On 14 December 2004, while Vladislav Ardzinba was still President, he issued a decree creating a Ministerial portfolio for Emergency Situations, and appointing Matosyan to this new post. 12 days after Sergei Bagapsh was sworn in as President on 12 February 2005, he repealed Ardzinba's decree and Matosyan did not return in the new cabinet.

Matosyan was again elected to the People's Assembly in the 4 March 2007 election, winning a first round victory in the Pshap constituency no. 22. Matosyan was subsequently nominated by Adgur Kharazia for the post of third Deputy Speaker, but lost out to Albert Ovsepyan. On 24 September 2010, Matosyan was nevertheless elected Deputy Speaker, after Albert Ovsepyan had retired.

At the 11 May 2007 founding congress of the opposition veterans' organisation Aruaa, Matosyan was elected into its supreme council.

== Administrative and later career ==
On 12 February 2015, Matosyan was appointed head of the Housing Department of the Sukhum City Administration by Acting Head of Administration Adgur Kharazia. Kharazia noted that his reputation as a veteran made him a respected choice for the role. Matosyan stated that his priority would be to ensure activities remained within the "letter of the law."

=== 2019 presidential election crisis ===
During the 2019 presidential election crisis, Matosyan urged against the use of force, stating that the nation must rely on the rule of law. He challenged the Supreme Court of Abkhazia to deliver a verdict based strictly on the law.
