= Stanislav Lakoba =

Abkhazia academic and politician (1953–2025)

- Станислав Лакоба

Secretary of the Security Council of Abkhazia
- In office 17 February 2005 – 25 August 2009
- President: Sergei Bagapsh
- Deputy: Aleksandr Voinskiy
- Preceded by: Almasbei Kchach
- Succeeded by: Aleksandr Voinskiy
- In office 7 December 2011 – 28 October 2013
- President: Alexander Ankvab
- Preceded by: Otar Khetsia
- Succeeded by: Nugzar Ashuba

Personal details
- Born: 23 February 1953 Sukhumi, Abkhaz ASSR, Georgian SSR, USSR
- Died: 20 September 2025 (aged 72)
- Party: Amtsakhara
- Education: Sukhumi State Pedagogical Institute

Stanislav Lakoba (Abkhaz: Станислав Лакоба, Georgian: სტანისლავ ლაკობა; 23 February 1953 – 20 September 2025) was an academic and politician from Abkhazia. Lakoba was Sergei Bagapsh's vice-presidential candidate in the 2004 presidential election and from 2005 to 2009 and again from 2011 to 2013 he served as Secretary of the Security Council. He was Professor in Archeology, Ethnology and History at the Abkhazian State University.

== Early life and career ==
Lakoba was born in Sukhumi on 23 February 1953. He was partially Afro-Abkhazian through a paternal great-grandfather from Pichori. Lakoba graduated from the History faculty of the Sukhumi State Pedagogical Institute.

He was the author of the 1989 Lykhny declaration. During the 1992–1993 war with Georgia Lakoba was a member of the Abkhazian Supreme Soviet. From 1993 to 1994 he served as First Deputy Chairman of the Supreme Council and from 1994 to 1996 as the First Deputy Speaker of the Supreme Soviet.

During the October 1999 presidential election Stanislav Lakoba published the controversial Выборы по Хичкоку - Hitchcock's election - an article in which he criticised the fact that in the election incumbent president Vladislav Ardzinba ran unopposed.

From 2000 onwards Lakoba became first Acting Professor and then Professor in Archeology, Ethnology and History at the Abkhazian State University. From 2000 to 2004 he was a visiting professor at the Hokkaido University Center for Slavic Studies.

== Vice presidential candidature in the 2004 presidential election ==
Stanislav Lakoba was a member of the socio-political movement Amtsakhara. In the run-up to the 3 October 2004 presidential election, Amtsakhara decided to enter into an alliance with fellow opposition party United Abkhazia. On 20 June, the two movements announced that they would nominate United Abkhazia's Sergei Bagapsh for the post of President and Lakoba for the post of Vice President.

Bagapsh and Lakoba narrowly won in the first round with just 50.08% of the votes, but this was hotly contested by supporters of Raul Khajimba. The resulting stand-off lasted until on 5 December Bagapsh and Khajimba struck a deal in which the pair would run on a combined ticket in a new election.

== Secretary of the Security Council ==
The deal between Bagapsh and Khajimba meant that Lakoba would no longer become vice president. Instead, after the new election on 12 January 2005, Lakoba was appointed Secretary of the Security Council on 17 February.

When Khajimba resigned as vice president on 28 May 2009 he declared that within the government he had received most support by Lakoba. On 18 August Lakoba himself handed his resignation over the Abkhazian citizenship crisis, which was ratified on 25 August by President Bagapsh. On 17 September Lakoba's deputy in the Security Council Aleksandr Voinskiy was appointed to temporarily succeed him.

In an interview with Caucasian Knot on 3 September Lakoba stated that he would not participate in the December 2009 presidential election and he called absurd the notion that he would join the opposition. Nevertheless, in an interview with the newspaper Nuzhnaya on 17 November, Lakoba stated that as a private citizen he supported Khajimba's candidacy and he praised his work in the Security Council.

After the death of Sergei Bagapsh in 2011, Stanislav Lakoba was once again appointed Security Council Secretary on 7 December by his successor Alexander Ankvab, previously Vice President.

However, on 28 October 2013, President Ankvab dismissed Stanislav Lakoba, over the same issue that had also prompted his resignation in 2009, the issuing of passports to Georgian residents of Abkhazia.

== Personal life and death ==
Lakoba died on 20 September 2025, at the age of 72, after suffering a heart attack while driving that led to his car crashing into a pole.

He was a distant relative of Nestor Lakoba.
