= Vazha Zarandia =

Soviet Abkhazian politician (born 1932)

Head of the Administration of Gali district
- In office December 1993 – April 1994

Chairman of the Council of Ministers of Abkhazia
- In office 5 May 1992 – 12 December 1993
- President: Vladislav Ardzinba
- Succeeded by: Sokrat Jinjolia

Personal details
- Born: 1 November 1932 (age 93) Uakum, Gali district, Abkhazian ASSR, Georgian SSR, Soviet Union

Ivan (Vazha) Zarandia (Abkhaz: Уажьа Зарандиа, Georgian: ვაჟა ზარანდია) (1 November 1932– disappeared 8 December 2025) was Chairman of the Council of Ministers of Abkhazia from 5 May 1992 to 12 December 1993.

== Early life ==
Zarandia was born on 1 November 1932, in the village of Uakum, where he attended school and worked on a state farm from 1951 to 1954. He then pursued higher education at the History and Philosophy Faculty of the Sukhumi State Pedagogical Institute from 1955 to 1959. From September 1960 to March 1961, he taught history at a school in Uakum.

== Political career in the Soviet Union ==
From March 1961 until January 1965, Zarandia was secretary of the Komsomol Committee of the Georgian Institute for Subtropical Agriculture in Sukhumi, and then until November 1967, chairman of its United Trade Union Committee. From November 1967 until August 1971, he was instructor with the Abkhazian Obkom of the Communist Party, and then until January 1974, department head. Between January and November 1974, Zarandia was both head of the Agriculture Department of the Abkhazian gorkom of the Communist Party, and chairman of the Sukhumi District's executive committee. From November 1974 until December 1991, he was the head of the State Procurement Inspectorate for the Abkhazian ASSR of the Union Ministry for Procurement.

== Post-Soviet political career ==
On 5 May 1992, Zarandia was elected Chairman of the Council of Ministers of Abkhazia, defeating Interior Minister Givi Lominadze. He held the position until 12 December 1993, but during the 1992-1993 war with Georgia, his tasks were in practice taken over by Leonid Lakerbaia. From December 1993 until April 1994, Zarandia was Governor of the Gali District.

In 2002, Zarandia was elected to the People's Assembly, becoming the oldest member of its 3rd convocation. In 2007, he failed to be re-elected in his constituency (no. 32, Uakum), losing to Omar Kvarchia.

Political offices
Preceded by none	Prime Minister of Abkhazia; 5 May 1992–12 December 1993	Succeeded by Sokrat Djindjolia
