= 1999 Abkhazian presidential election =

- 3 October 1999
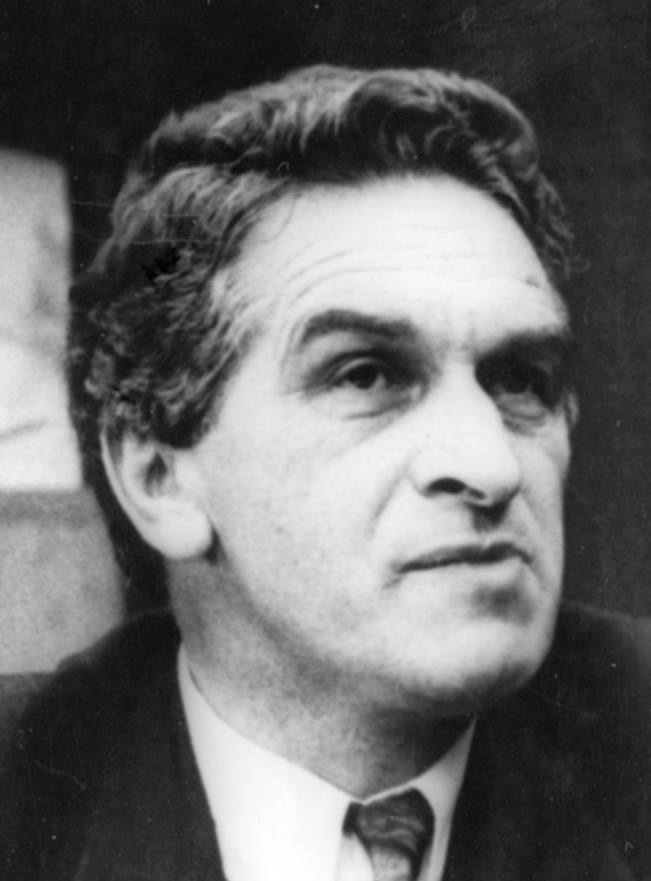
Nominee	Vladislav Ardzinba
Party	Apsny
Running mate	Valery Arshba
Popular vote	186,792
Percentage	99.11%
- Results by district Ardzinba: 90-100%
President before election
Vladislav Ardzinba
Apsny
Elected President
Vladislav Ardzinba
Apsny

Presidential elections were held in Abkhazia on 3 October 1999, alongside a constitutional referendum. They were the first direct presidential elections in Abkhazia, and resulted in a victory for incumbent President Vladislav Ardzinba, who ran unopposed.

== Background ==
The previous presidential elections in 1994 had been indirect, with Ardzinba elected by the People's Assembly.

In August 1999 the Central Election Commission (CEC) headed by Viacheslav Tsugba set-up 28 electoral districts for the purpose of the elections.

== Campaign ==
Incumbent President Ardzinba was nominated by the national-patriotic movement Apsny, and also received the support of the Communist Party and the Abkhaz diaspora in Turkey.

On 2 September, the CEC registered the nomination of former Foreign Minister Leonid Lakerbaia by his People's Party. However, his candidacy was not approved. The CEC also denied registration to Yahya Kazan, who had been Abkhazia's representative in the United States, on the grounds that he had not lived in Abkhazia for the previous five years and that he did not have a working command of the Abkhaz language.

There were also rumours that former Vice Chairman Zurab Achba of Aidgylara would run for president, which he dismissed in an interview with Nuzhnaya Gazeta as a "nightmare of an idea".

== Results ==
Candidate	Running mate	Party	Votes	%
Vladislav Ardzinba	Valeri Arshba	Apsny	186,792	99.11
Against all			1,683	0.89
Total			188,475	100.00
Valid votes			188,475	99.93
Invalid/blank votes			129	0.07
Total votes			188,604	100.00
Registered voters/turnout			214,503	87.93
Source: Lenta.ru
