= Anri Jergenia =

Prime Minister of Abkhazia (1941–2020)

- Анри Џьергьениа

4th Prime Minister of Abkhazia
- In office 7 June 2001 – 29 November 2002
- President: Vladislav Ardzinba
- Preceded by: Vyacheslav Tsugba
- Succeeded by: Gennady Gagulia

Personal details
- Born: 8 August 1941 Leningrad, Russian SFSR, Soviet Union
- Died: 5 January 2020 (aged 78) Moscow, Russian Federation
- Party: formerly Amtsakhara
- Relations: Svetlana Jergenia (cousin)
- Education: Moscow State University
- Occupation: Lawyer

Anri Mikhail-ipa Jergenia (Abkhaz: Анри Михаил-иԥа Џьергьениа; 8 August 1941 – 5 January 2020) was one of the leading politicians of the internationally unrecognised Republic of Abkhazia since it achieved de facto independence from Georgia. From June 2001 to November 2002, he was the republic's Prime Minister, and for a time, Jergenia looked to be the favourite to succeed Abkhazia's first president Vladislav Ardzinba.

== Early life and career ==
Jergenia was born on 8 August 1941 in Leningrad, Russian SFSR, Soviet Union. He graduated from Moscow State University with a diploma in Law in 1963. During Soviet times, he held several offices within the administration of the Abkhazian Autonomous Soviet Socialist Republic: investigator at the Interior Ministry, chief investigator of the Prosecutor’s Office of Sukhumi, Public Court Chairman of Sukhumi and member of the Supreme Court of the Abkhazian ASSR.

After the break-up of the Soviet Union, from 1992 to 2001, Jergenia served as the Prosecutor General of the Republic of Abkhazia, in which, amongst other things, he had to defend Abkhazia's treatment of its prisoners of war. On 14 April 1999, Jergenia was reappointed by the People's Assembly to a second term as Prosecutor General only after several rounds of voting.

From 1990 to 2002 Jergenia was the chief negotiator and designated representative at the Georgian-Abkhazian peace conference for President Vladislav Ardzinba. In this capacity, he personally handled most of the negotiations with Russia, Georgia, the United States and the United Nations.

== Prime minister ==
Jergenia was appointed to the post of Prime Minister on 7 June 2001. Due to President Ardzinba's deteriorating health, Jergenia could lead Abkhazia politically, unlike previous Prime Ministers, who had mainly concerned themselves with economic policy. Perhaps even more so than other Abkhazian politicians, he was pro-Russian, and vociferously opposed to reunification with Georgia. Jergenia openly discussed working towards associate membership of Russia and encouraged Abkhazians to take up Russian passports, which a large percentage of the population eventually did. He also pledged a military alliance with Eduard Kokoity, President of South Ossetia to discourage Georgia from attacking either entity.

On 29 November 2002, Jergenia was fired by President Ardzinba, officially due to his failure to ensure fulfillment of budget targets and to prepare adequately for winter. However, for the first nine months of that year, the budget had been implemented fully, and Jergenia's dismissal was widely seen as politically motivated. At the moment of his sacking, he had just returned from Moscow where he had signed a contract on supplying electricity to Krasnodar krai from Abkhazia, and he was widely seen at the time as the main candidate for succeeding Ardzinba as president. The President's wife, Svetlana Ardzinba, was Jergenia's first cousin, and Jergenia was thought to have been building up support in Moscow. Some think that Ardzinba found that Jergenia was too openly ambitious about the presidency, that he put Russian interests above Abkhazian interest, or that he dropped support for Jergenia due to his unpopularity with the Abkhazian population.

Jergenia was replaced by former Prime Minister Gennady Gagulia. This led to a shift in Abkhazian foreign policy, as Jergenia, while still steadfast on the question of independence, was much more open to negotiations than his successor.

Jergenia was a close friend and collaborator of Ardzinba from the 1970s, but the two fell out when Ardzinba dismissed Jergenia as Prime Minister. They reconciled after Ardzinba retired as President in 2005.

== 2004 presidential elections ==
Already during the 2002 Parliamentary elections, while still Prime Minister, Jergenia had supported the parliamentary candidates of public movement Amtsakhara. In 2003, he spoke at Amtsakhara's congress, where he argued in favour of reducing Presidential powers and moving towards a mixed presidential/parliamentary model of government. Jergenia then became Amtsakhara's favoured candidate for the October 2004 presidential elections before it entered into an alliance with United Abkhazia and chose to back Sergei Bagapsh instead. A minority faction of Amtsakhara continued its support for Jergenia, and he did enter into the elections, with Ruslan Kishmaria as his Vice-Presidential candidate, head of the Gali district assembly. The pair came in only fourth place in the first round, receiving 2277 votes, and did not contest the second.

Political offices
Preceded by Viacheslav Tsugba	Prime Minister of Abkhazia; 2001–2002	Succeeded by Gennady Gagulia
