= Vladimir Nachach =

Abkhaz politician (1940–2011)

Vladimir Emin-ipa Nachach (Abkhaz: Владимир Емин-иҧа Начач; 22 August 1940 – 8 February 2011) was an Abkhazian Jurist, Major-General and politician.

== Early life ==
Nachach was born on 22 August 1940 in Lower Eshera, Abkhazia. In 1947, Nachach joined Lower Eshera's primary school. In 1949, he was deported along with his family to the Parbigsky (now Bakchar) District, Tomsk Oblast. They were allowed to return in 1957. In 1958, Nachach completed Sukhumi's secondary school #10. Nachach performed military service with the Soviet Navy from 1959 until 1961, when he started his studies at the Faculty of Law of Leningrad University. He later switched to the All-Union Correspondence Law Institute in Moscow.

== Career ==
Nachach's first job was as a lawyer with Gudauta's Legal Advice Centre, where he worked from 1967 until August 1968. He subsequently joined the Ministry of Internal Affairs, until 1992.

Nachach participated and was injured in the 1992-1993 war with Georgia, commanding a volunteer corps from Gudauta, which was transformed during the war into the second battalion. From 1992 until 2002, Nachach was Military Prosecutor of the Republic of Abkhazia.

Nachach was first elected to the People's Assembly of Abkhazia in 2002, in the Gudauta constituency (no. 16). He was subsequently elected Chairman of the Committee on Legislation, Judicial and Legal Reform and State Building. Also in 2002, Nachach became co-chairman of the veterans organisation Amtsakhara, which developed into an opposition force against President Vladislav Ardzinba. Throughout 2003 and 2004, calls intensified for Ardzinba to voluntarily resign, or to be deposed. On 30 January 2004, the People's Assembly unanimously entrusted Nachach with the preparation for an impeachment bill. However, the bill never materialised, and the next Presidential Election was planned for 3 October 2004 anyhow. On 16 June, Amtsakhara and United Abkhazia established a Coordinating Council to jointly contest the election, of which Nachach became a member. The two parties nominated Sergei Bagapsh as their Presidential candidate, who won the election after a tense stand-off with runner-up Raul Khajimba.

In November 2005, Nachach became a member of the newly founded Commission on Constitutional Reform. In December 2006, Nachach was delegated to the first meeting of the Inter-Parliamentary Assembly of South Ossetia, Abkhazia and Transnistria. On 4 March 2007, Nachach was re-elected as Deputy by a first-round victory in the Gudauta constituency. At the first meeting of the new convocation, Nachach successfully nominated Nugzar Ashuba for re-election as Speaker. On 6 April, Nachach was himself re-elected as head of the Committee on Legislation, Judicial and Legal Reform and State Building. In July 2008, Nachach was a member of the delegation of the People's Assembly that visited Chechnya. In March 2009, Nachach and 21 other deputies established the pro-government faction Unity.

== Awards ==
Following the 1992-1993 war with Georgia, Nachach was designated Hero of Abkhazia in 1994. On 22 August 2005, Nachach was awarded the Akhdz-Apsha order second class by President Bagapsh for his achievements in the war and in politics. On 12 January 2007, Nachach was awarded a diploma by the People's Assembly for his work in Parliament- and state-building.

== Death ==
Vladimir Nachach died in office on 8 February 2011 after a long illness. He was buried on 11 February in his native Lower Eshera.
