= Marina Bartsyts =

Ethnologist from Abkhazia

- Born: 16 November 1964 (age 61); Gudata, Abkhazia
- Occupations: Anthropologist; former politician

Academic background
- Education: Rostov State University, Institute of Ethnology - Moscow

Academic work
- Institutions: Abkhazian State University

Marina Bartsyts (Abkhaz: Марина Барцыц; born 16 November 1964) is an anthropologist and former politician from Abkhazia.

== Biography ==
Bartsyts was born on 16 November 1964 in the village of Blabyrkhua in Gudauta district, Abkhazia. Her parents were Mkan Bartsyts and Venera Tskua; they had two sons and two daughters, of which Marina is the youngest.

=== Education ===
After finishing school, Bartsyts went to study history at Rostov State University. She graduated in 1987, in 1992 moved to Moscow to study at graduate school at the Institute of Ethnology in Moscow and graduated there in 1995.

=== War in Abkhazia (1992–93) ===
Shortly after arriving in Moscow, however, Bartsyts heard that war in Abkhazia had broken out. She returned to Abkahzia in September 1992 to join the conflict, first arriving in Gudauta to work with Vladislav Ardzinba. By October, Bartsyts had joined the frontline and was with the 2nd Verkhneeshersky Battalion. Bartsyts trained as a medic and served as a medical instructor on the Gumistinsky Front. During the war, Bartsyts took many photographs on a World War 2 era Soviet camera: her collection is one of the most important records of life during the war.

== Career ==
Bartsyts researches Abkhazia, its settlements and its people, examining their traditional culture in terms of law, psychology and gender. She has worked on the city of Sukhumi and its place relative to other Abkhazian cities. She has published research into traditional Abkhazian folklore. Bartsyts research into Abkhaz culture sees it based on three principles: hospitality, respect for elders and respect for women. In particular, she sees a historic balance of respect between men and women.

From 2001 to 2007, Bartsyts served as a deputy in the People's Assembly of Abkhazia. At the time of here election in 2007, she and her fellow deputy Emma Gamisonia were the only women serving in the parliament. She is a member of the Supreme Council of the World Abaza Congress.

Bartsyts works at the Abkhazian State University.
