= Sokrat Jinjolia =

Prime Minister of Abkhazia (born 1937)

Sokrat Rachevich Jinjolia Сократ Аџьынџьал

1st Speaker of the People's Assembly of Abkhazia
- In office 1996–2002
- Deputy: Ruslan Kharabua, Oleg Petrov
- Succeeded by: Nugzar Ashuba

Chairman of the Council of Ministers of Abkhazia
- In office 12 December 1993 – 26 November 1994
- President: Vladislav Ardzinba
- Preceded by: Vazha Zarandia
- Succeeded by: Gennadi Gagulia (as Prime Minister of Abkhazia)

1st Minister for Foreign Affairs of Abkhazia
- In office 1993–1994
- President: Vladislav Ardzinba
- Preceded by: Said Tarkil (acting))
- Succeeded by: Leonid Lakerbaia

Personal details
- Born: December 11, 1937 (age 88) Agubedia, Ochamchira District, Abkhazian ASSR, Georgian SSR, Soviet Union
- Website: http://www.govabk.org/history/socrat.php

Sokrat Rachevich Jinjolia (Abkhaz: Сократ Аџьынџьал, Georgian: სოკრატ ჯინჯოლია; born 11 December 1937) was the second prime minister and the second foreign minister of the internationally unrecognised Republic of Abkhazia from 12 December 1993 to 26 November 1994. He has also been the speaker of the People's Assembly of Abkhazia from 1996 until he lost his seat in the 2002 parliamentary elections to Anatoly Khashba, and was succeeded by Nugzar Ashuba. He graduated from the Department of Russian Language and Literature Faculty of Philology of Sukhumi Pedagogical Institute. In 1956–1959 he served in the Soviet Army. After transferring to the Army reserve, he worked on Tkvarcheli power plant, and in 1967 was elected secretary to the Tkvarcheli City Council. Between 1985 and 1988 he worked on the Tkvarcheli Party Committee, becoming head of the Department of Agitation and Propaganda. In 1988–1992 – chief editor of "Tkvarchalsky Miner." In 1991, he was elected to the Supreme Council, and in 1992 he became deputy chairman of the Abkhazian armed forces. In 12 December 1993 he was appointed prime minister. He headed the official delegation from Abkhazia for the peace talks in Geneva. He was elected speaker of the new parliament – the National Assembly – the first and second convocations. He is married. He has two children. During the 2004 presidential elections, Jinjolia was head of opposition candidate Sergei Bagapsh's election team. He has since become the head of the Sukhumi branch of the Caucasian Institute for Democracy. Recently, Jinjolia became a member of the newly founded Public Chamber of Abkhazia.

Political offices
Preceded by Vazha Zarandia	Prime Minister of Abkhazia; 12 December 1993–26 November 1994	Succeeded by Gennady Gagulia
Preceded by Said Tarkil (acting)	Minister of Foreign Affairs of Abkhazia; 1993–1994	Succeeded by Leonid Lakerbaia
Preceded by none	Speaker of the People's Assembly of Abkhazia; 1996 –2002	Succeeded by Nugzar Ashuba
