= Zurab Achba =

Abkhazian politician

Zurab Achba (23 February 1950 – 15 August 2000) is an assassinated politician from Abkhazia.

== Early life ==
Zurab Achba was born on 23 February 1950. He attended Sukhumi's secondary school no. 10 named after Nestor Lakoba and graduated from the Law Faculty of the Moscow State University.

== Career ==
Achba was a member of the People's Assembly of Abkhazia. Between 1990 and 1992, he was Vice Chairman of Aidgylara. During the nineties, he had been critical of President Vladislav Ardzinba. There were rumours that Achba would run for president in the 1999 presidential election, which he dismissed in an interview with Nuzhnaya Gazeta as a "nightmare of an idea".

== Death ==
Achba was shot dead from a passing car in front of his house on 15 August 2000.
