= Elections in Abkhazia =

Abkhazia elects, on the national level, a head of state – the president – and a legislature. The president is elected for a five-year term by the people. The People's Assembly has 35 members, elected for a five-year term in single seat constituencies.

On 28 February 1996, Abkhazia's Parliament adopted a referendum law according to which referendums may be initiated by Parliament, by the President, or by a group of citizens who have collected at least 10,000 signatures. Since then, Abkhazia has held two referendums in 1999 to approve its constitution and declaration of independence, and one in 2016 to hold early presidential elections, but it was declared invalid due to low voter turnout.

== Parliamentary elections ==
=== 2012 Parliamentary elections ===
In early March the 35 seats of Parliament were contested by 150 candidates. It was monitored by some NGOs from countries in the Commonwealth of Independent States, as well as by a delegation from Tuvalu.

== See also ==
- Electoral calendar
- Electoral system
- Elections in Georgia
