= Security Council of Abkhazia =

Highest national security body in the Government of Abkhazia

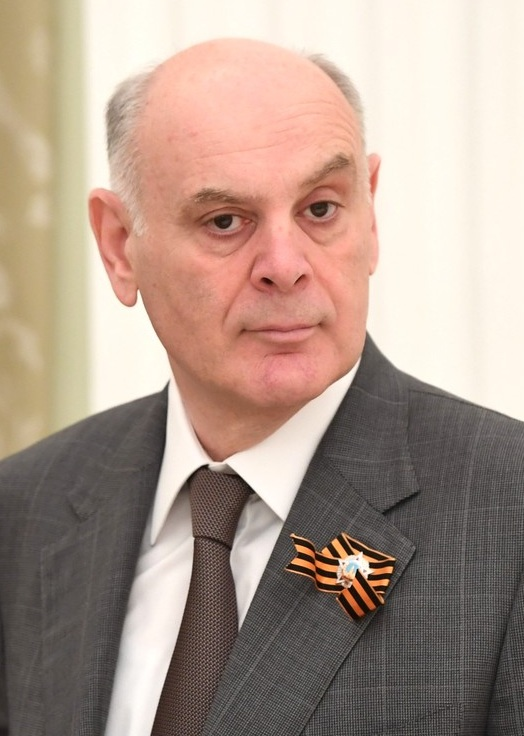
President Aslan Bzhania, the current Chairman of the council.

The Security Council of Abkhazia (Russian: Совет Безопасности Республики Абхазия), abbreviated as the Sovbez of Abkhazia (Russian: Совбез Абхазии) is the highest national security decision-making body in the Government of Abkhazia, serving as an advisory body to the President of Abkhazia. The Security Council provides way for the implementation of the constitutional powers of the President given to him/her by the Constitution of Abkhazia. It is located at the buildings on 32 Mahadzhirov Embankment.

== Sovbez structure ==
The council has the following structure:

- President of the Republic
- Prime Minister
- Speaker of the People's Assembly
- Security Council Secretary
- General Prosecutor
- Minister of Defense
- Chairman of the State Security Service
- Minister of the Interior
- Minister of Foreign Affairs
- Chief of the General Staff

The Secretary of the Security Council is an official that reports directly to the President and is also appointed and dismissed by the President. The apparatus provides organizational, technical and informational and analytical support for the activities of the Security Council.

== Secretaries of the Council ==
- Astamur Tarba (2 February 2000-April 2003)
- Almasbey Kchach (April 2003 – 2005)
- Stanislav Lakoba (2005-25 August 2009)
- Alexander Voinsky (25 August 2009 – 18 August 2010)
- Otar Khetsia (18 August 2010 – 5 December 2011)
- Stanislav Lakoba (6 December 2011 – 29 October 2013)
- Nugzar Ashuba (29 October 2013 – 4 June 2014)
- Muhamed Kilba (28 October 2014 – 22 January 2020)
- Beslan Kvitsiniya (since 22 January 2020)

== See also ==
- Security Council of Russia
- Security Council of Armenia
