= 2004 Abkhazian presidential election =

← 1999	3 October 2004	2005 →
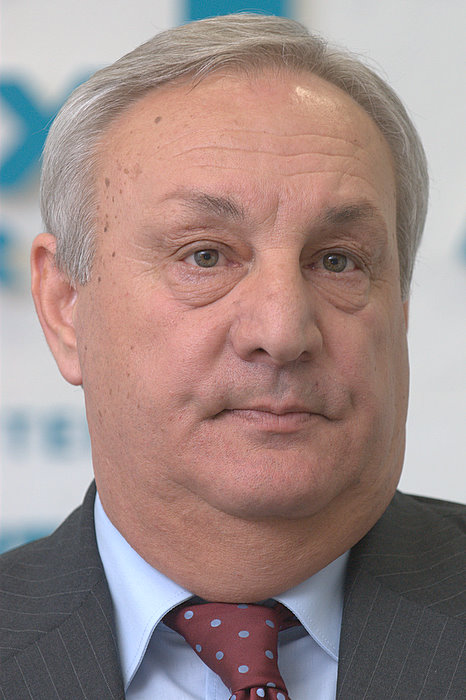

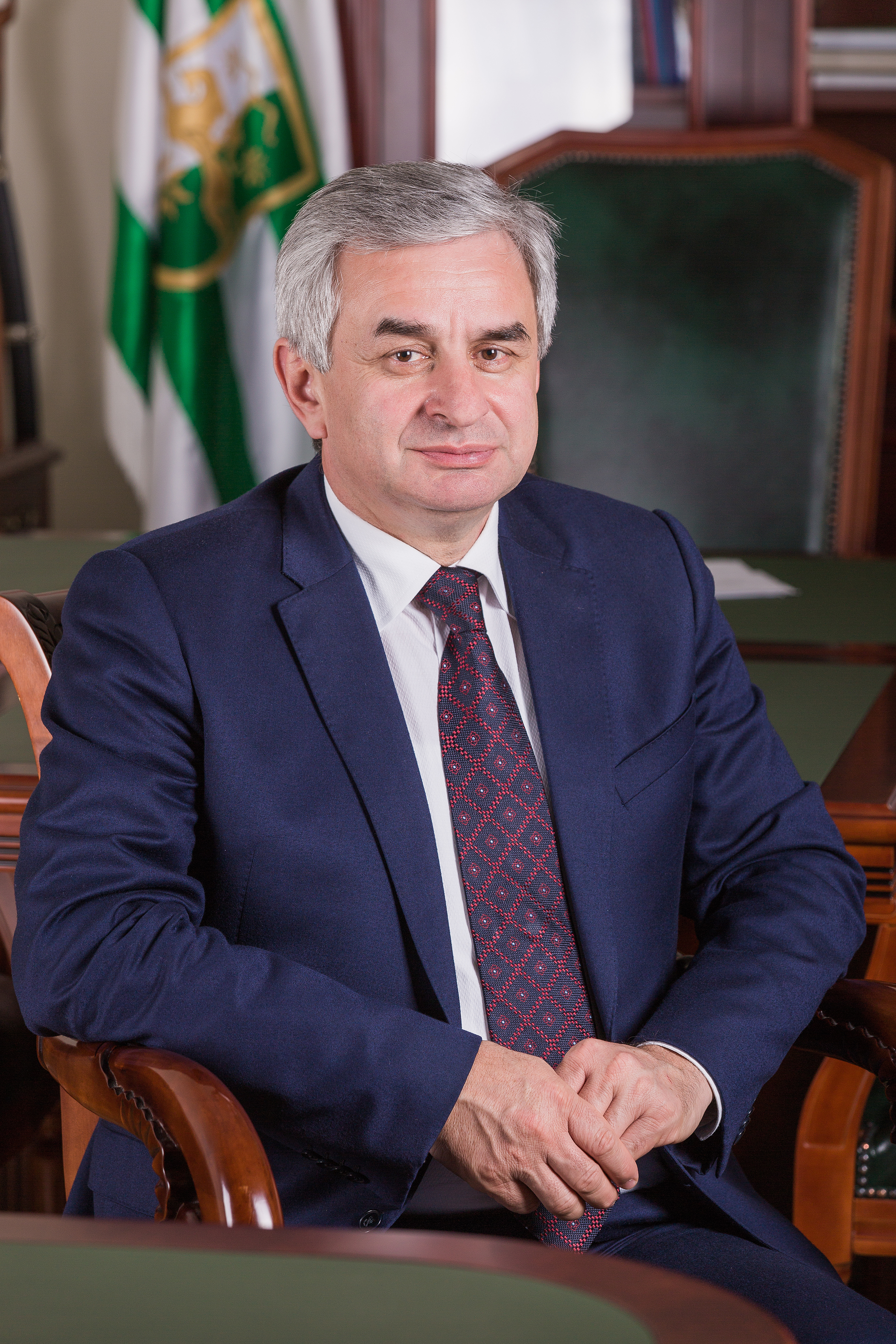

Nominee	Sergei Bagapsh	Raul Khajimba	Sergei Shamba
Party	United Abkhazia	FNUA	Independent
Running mate	Stanislav Lakoba	Vitali Smyr	Vladimir Arshba
Popular vote	43,336	30,815	5,993
Percentage	51.31%	36.49%	7.10%
President before election
Vladislav Ardzinba
Independent
Elected President
Election results annulled
Vladislav Ardzinba becomes interim president

Presidential elections were held in Abkhazia on 3 October 2004, the first that were competitive. Election law prohibited incumbent President Vladislav Ardzinba from running for a third term and he instead backed Prime Minister Raul Khadjimba, who also enjoyed support from the Russian authorities. Khadjimba's main opponent was Sergei Bagapsh, who was supported by the two major opposition parties, United Abkhazia and Amtsakhara, and later also by Aitaira when their candidate Alexander Ankvab was barred from running in a controversial decision by the Central Election Commission.

Bagapsh won in the first round with just over 50% of the vote. However, the results of the elections were heavily contested, with Khadjimba claiming that he had received the most votes and that a run-off was necessary. The Central Election Commission issued several conflicting rulings and the stand-off lasted for two months until on 5 December, Bagapsh and Khadjimba agreed to share power as President and Vice President respectively.

== Background ==
On 14 July, during a session to which also Vice President Valery Arshba, Prime Minister Raul Khajimba, the cabinet and the general public were invited, the Parliament set the date for the elections to be 3 October 2004.

At the time of the elections, the Republican Party "Apsny" was the main pro-governmental party, and there were four active opposition movements, Aitaira, United Abkhazia, Amtsakhara and the People's Party.

== Candidates ==
Prospective candidates had to be nominated by an interest group, a socio-political group or a political party between 4 and 23 August 2004. The nominees then had time until 18:00 local time on 23 August to register their candidacy with the Central Election Commission by submitting the required papers, and at least 2000 (but not more than 2500) signatures supporting their candidacy. In order for their candidacy to be accepted, nominees had to pass an Abkhaz language test, and to satisfy a residency requirement – they had to have lived in Abkhazia for the last 5 years before the election date.

A total of nine people were nominated, of which seven registered their candidacy. On 2 September the Central Election Commission announced that the registration of six candidates had been approved., but 3 September one candidate withdrew. The five candidates that participated in the elections are, in order of nomination:

- Anri Jergenia, former Prime Minister, with Ruslan Kishmaria as running mate. Jergenia was nominated by an initiative group on 4 August. Papers required for the registration of his candidacy were submitted 23 August, and on the same day, he passed the Abkhaz language test.
- Raul Khadjimba, Prime Minister and former Minister of Defence, with Vitali Smyr as running mate. Khajimba was nominated on 5 August by an initiative group. On 10 August, the Republican Party "Apsny" also nominated Khadjimba, and on 12 August Khadjimba was nominated by two more initiative groups. Papers required for the registration of Khadjimba's candidacy were submitted 19 August. Khadjimba passed his Abkhaz language test on 20 August.
- Sergei Bagapsh, head of Chernomorenergo and former Prime Minister, with Stanislav Lakoba as running mate. Bagapsh was nominated on 5 August by the socio-political organisations United Abkhazia and Amtsakhara and he later also received the support of Aitaira and the Federation of Independent Trade Unions. Papers required for the registration of Bagapsh's candidacy were submitted 21 August. On 23 August, Bagapsh passed the Abkhaz language test and United Abkhazia and Amtsakhara submitted the required papers for his registration.
- Sergei Shamba, former Minister for Foreign Affairs, with Vladimir Arshba as running mate. Shamba was registered on 6 August by an initiative group. Papers required for the registration of Shamba's candidacy were submitted 19 August. Shamba passed his Abkhaz language test on 20 August.
- Iakub Lakoba, head of the People's Party of Abkhazia, with Fatima Kvitsinia as running mate. Lakoba was first nominated on 12 August by an initiative group, and then on 18 August also by the People's Party of Abkhazia. Papers required for the registration of Lakoba's candidacy were submitted 23 August, and he passed the language test on the same day.

There was one candidate whose registration was accepted but who decided not to run anyway:

- Valery Arshba, Vice President, with Vice Speaker of the People's Assembly Alexander Stranichkin as running mate. He was nominated by one initiative group. Papers required for the registration of Arshba's candidacy were submitted 23 August, and he passed his language test on the same day. On 3 September Valery Arshba announced that he was withdrawing from the elections.

There was one nominee whose registration was not accepted:

- Alexander Ankvab, businessman in Moscow, and former Minister for Internal Affairs. He was nominated by an initiative group on 4 August. On 7 August the socio-political organisation Aitaira unanimously decided to support Ankvab's candidacy. Papers required for the registration of Ankvab's candidacy were submitted 23 August, but he refused to take the language test. On 2 September the Central Election Commission announced that it did not accept Ankvab's candidacy because his proficiency in the Abkhaz language could not be established.

There were two nominees who did not register their candidacy:

- Nodar Khashba, official in the Russian Ministry for Emergencies and former Mayor of Sukhumi. He was nominated by an initiative group on 12 August. On 23 August, Nodar Khashba stated that he had not registered his candidacy because he did not intend to run for President – he had been nominated without being consulted on the matter. Khashba also added that his registration would not stand a chance of being accepted because he failed the residency requirement.
- Anatoly Otyrba, businessman in Russia. He failed to collect enough signatures and there was slim chance of his candidacy being accepted since he also failed the residency requirement.

=== Raul Khajimba, government candidate ===
Outgoing president Vladislav Ardzinba was by law prohibited from running for a third term, and his health would not have allowed him to either. Instead, the government's candidate for the presidential election was outgoing Prime Minister Khajimba. On 18 August, Ardzinba said in an interview with Respublika Abkhazia that Khajimba was the person most qualified to succeed him, and he appealed to all voters to vote for him. Khajimba also received the support of the Russian authorities. Russian President Vladimir Putin had worked for the KGB like Khajimba, and posters of the two together were hanging everywhere in Sukhumi. Deputies of Russia's parliament and Russian singers, led by Joseph Kobzon, both a deputy and a popular songster, came to Abkhazia campaigning for Khajimba.

On 11 August, the Republican Party "Apsny", which supported Khadjimba's nomination, issued a statement in which it warned that Georgia might try to influence the elections.

=== United Abkhazia and Amtsakhara unite to nominate Sergei Bagapsh ===
United Abkhazia planned to present former Prime Minister Sergei Bagapsh and former Minister for Foreign Affairs Sergei Shamba as presidential and vice presidential candidates, with the order still to be determined, and former mayor of Sukhumi Nodar Khashba was to become prime minister. At the same time, there were some in Amtsakhara who wanted to field former Prime Minister Anri Jergenia as presidential candidate. However, United Abkhazia and Amtsakhara then decided to enter into a political alliance. In an interview with the newspaper Amtsakhara in July, Sergei Bagapsh said that the murder of Garri Aiba had been one of the factors that brought them together. On 20 June, United Abkhazia and Amtsakhara announced that Sergei Bagapsh would be their presidential candidate, and Stanislav Lakoba their vice presidential candidate.

Shamba and Jergenia, who had thus lost out, both decided to run for President independently. Nodar Khashba was also nominated by an initiative group, but he did not register his candidacy, stating that he had been nominated without being consulted and that his registration would not stand a chance as he failed the five-year residency requirement.

=== Exclusion of Alexander Ankvab ===
The presidential candidate for Aitaira was former Minister for Internal Affairs Alexander Ankvab. Ankvab refused to undergo the written Abkhaz language test mandated by law, on the grounds that the constitution did not provide for this.

On 28 August, head of State Security Service Mikhail Tarba said that Aitaira chairman Leonid Lakerbaia had breached the law by calling for an overthrow of power if necessary. In turn, Lakerbaia denied having made the statement and declared that he would initiate a defamation action against Tarba.

On 2 September, the central election commission announced that it rejected the registration of Aitaira's candidate Alexander Ankvab on the grounds that he had not lived the whole past five years in Abkhazia and that his proficiency in the Abkhaz language could not be established completely. On 3 September Aitaira petitioned the Central Election Commission to reverse this decision, and it appealed the Supreme Court to overrule the Central Election Commission. It contested that Ankvab was perfectly fluent in Abkhaz, but that the written language test contravened the constitution. Furthermore, Aitaira put forward that Ankvab had indeed resided in Abkhazia during the last five years, as demonstrated by Abkhazian documents and witnesses, but that the CEC had ignored these basing its decision solely on Russian documents showing that Ankvab also paid taxes there.

On 9 September, Aitaira convened an extraordinary congress to discuss the matter, where it was suggested the party might support Sergei Bagapsh should the Supreme Court not rule in its favour. Among the guests who addressed the congress were Sergei Bagapsh, acting Prime Minister Astamur Tarba, chairman of the Central Election Commission Sergei Smyr and Chairman of the Language Commission Aleksei Kaslandzia.

On 10 September The Supreme Court upheld the Central Election Commission's decision to bar Alexander Ankvab from the presidential elections. The court agreed with Ankvab and Aitaira that the CEC had failed to demonstrate that Ankvab had failed the residence requirements, but it also ruled that the CEC had been right to exclude Ankvab on the grounds that he had not taken the written language test. Even if this test went against the constitution, the law being the law Ankvab should have complied with it.

During the proceedings, Chairman of the Language Commission Aleksei Kaslandzia testified that Ankvab did in fact have an excellent command of Abkhaz. He had spoken with the Commission's members in Abkhaz for 2 hours and 5 minutes, where just over half an hour is normal. He had not read the provided reading material, but had at one point started to read from and discuss the newspaper Respublika Abkhazia, which Kaslandzia judged to be of a far higher difficulty.

In fact, the initial protocol prepared by the Language Commission had stated that Ankvab's command of the Abkhaz language was excellent, but this protocol had mysteriously disappeared. Chairman of the CEC, Sergei Smyr had then insisted that the second draft of the protocol should state that Ankvab's proficiency could not be established, because he had not been fully tested. Language Commission chairman Aleksei Kaslandzia testified that Smyr had gone so far as to threaten him with litigation should he not comply.

After the ruling by the Supreme Court, Aitaira entered into an election alliance with United Abkhazia, Amtsakhara and the Federation of Independent Trade Unions, supporting Sergei Bagapsh and Stanislav Lakoba, with the agreement that Alexander Ankvab would become Prime Minister should the bid be successful, the position originally projected for Nodar Khashba.

=== Other candidates ===
The People's Party of Abkhazia put forward Iakub Lakoba as their presidential candidate. The decision during the Party's sixth extraordinary congress on 18 August to officially nominate Lakoba was not unanimous: the Gagra and Gudauta branches thought it wiser to support Alexander Ankvab's nomination.

Vice President Valery Arshba ran independently for president, with Vice Speaker of Parliament Alexander Stranichkin as running mate. On 31 August, in his capacity of vice president, Arshba called on local authorities to uphold election law and enable fair elections. Arshba's registration was accepted, but a day later, on 3 December he announced that he withdrew from the race.

== Campaign ==
Election poster of Raul Khadjimba

Candidates could officially begin their election campaign after their registration had been accepted on 2 September. 18 August, a round table conference organised by Apsnypress and the Sukhum Media Club had adopted a set of ethical principals by journalists during the elections. On 31 August, as demanded by the Abkhazian constitution since Khajimba was participating in the elections, his premiership was temporarily suspended by President Ardzinba, his duties to be performed by first Deputy Prime Minister Astamur Tarba.

Corresponding to election law, each candidate received five bits of free air time on national television, of which four live and one prerecorded. The broadcasting slots of these items was determined by lot by the Central Election Commission.

On 17 September, the People's Assembly invited the Russian Club for Promoting Political Participation of Voters to observe the upcoming elections.

On 23 September, the Union of Volunteers from Kabardino-Balkaria expressed its support for Khajimba.

On 1 October, the five presidential candidates debated live on national television, and they agreed not to campaign the following day, the day before the elections.

== Conduct ==
Election law forbade candidates to campaign on 3 October, the day of the presidential elections. The 190 polling stations opened 8:00 local time. In the afternoon Chief of the Central Election Commission Sergei Smyr announced that more than 120,000 voters had been registered and that by 13:00, more than 40% had voted. Head of the Gali district administration Yuri Kvekveskiri announced that there were no more than 15,000 voters in the Gali district.

Head of the Club for Promoting Political Participation of Voters Nikolai Timakov declared in a press conference that elections had in general been organised well, and that the minor violations witnessed would not affect the outcome of the elections. Timakov reported that in the polling stations inspected by the club, members of the law enforcement agencies ensured the safety of voters and that voter lists as well as excerpts from the election law and posters of all the candidates had been attached to the walls.

== Results ==
According to the original results published by Central Election Committee published in October, Khadjimba won the election with more than a 52% of the votes.

Candidate	Party	Votes	%
Raul Khadjimba	Forum for the National Unity of Abkhazia	101,500	52.84
Sergei Bagapsh	United Abkhazia	64,500	33.58
Sergei Shamba	Independent	19,050	9.92
Iakub Lakoba	People's Party of Abkhazia	5,250	2.73
Anri Jergenia	Independent	1,800	0.94
Total		192,100	100.00
Source: Kavkaz Uzel

According to the official results, Bagapsh received 50.08% of all votes cast (including invalid votes), narrowly crossing the 50% threshold required to avoid a second round.

Candidate	Party	Votes	%
Sergei Bagapsh	United Abkhazia	43,336	51.31
Raul Khadjimba	Forum for the National Unity of Abkhazia	30,815	36.49
Sergei Shamba	Independent	5,993	7.10
Anri Jergenia	Independent	2,277	2.70
Iakub Lakoba	People's Party of Abkhazia	806	0.95
Against all		1,230	1.46
Total		84,457	100.00
Valid votes		84,457	97.23
Invalid/blank votes		2,404	2.77
Total votes		86,861	100.00
Registered voters/turnout		137,564	63.14
Source: Kavkaz Uzel

== Aftermath ==
On 12 October Abkhazia's Supreme Court, after a series of contradictory decisions by the Electoral Committee, recognized that the new president would be businessman Sergei Bagapsh, accused by his rival's supporters of being pro-Georgian. (Georgia did not recognize any separatist candidates or even the elections). Abkhazia's outgoing President Ardzinba claimed the decision was illegal and made under pressure from supporters of Bagapsh. The decision was cancelled by the Supreme Court the night of the same day. When supporters of Raul Khadjimba seized the building of the Supreme Court and destroyed the protocols from local electoral constituencies new elections were prescribed.

Soon the Supreme Court cancelled the later decision, and again named Bagapsh the new president. His supporters captured a local TV station, while Raul Khadjimba's supporters took control over the parliament's building. Outgoing president Ardzinba replaced Raul Khadjimba as a prime-minister with Nodar Khashba, who, before this appointment served in the Ministry of Extraordinary Situations.

=== Taking of the Presidential building by Bagapsh's supporters ===
On 11 November, both Bagapsh and Khajimba met for around three hours with Ardzinba. According to Daur Tarba, member of Bagapsh's election team, Ardzinba initially agreed with Khajimba that the elections should be held again, but changed his mind when Bagapsh offered Khajimba "a very high post" in his future government.

On Friday 12 November, around 10,000 supporters of Sergei Bagapsh gathered on Freedom Square, and around 500 supporters of Raul Khajimba gathered next to the Presidential building. During the day, Bagapsh and Khajimba met twice, first in the Galereya café and at 3pm again for about ten minutes. After the second meeting, Bagapsh told his supporters that no compromise had been reached but that dialogue would continue. Following this, his supporters expressed their dissatisfaction about the lack of progress, the crowd broke up into two parts that then moved towards the Presidential building. The supporters of Khajimba present at the site, moved back and some brawls broke out. In the meantime, Khajimba and Prime Minister Khashba left the building through the back door. As Bagapsh's supporters moved into the building, they encountered guards who fired warning shots into the air. The ricochets injured two of Bagapsh's supporters and mortally wounded the 78 years old Tamara Shakryl, an academic and human rights campaigner who supported Khajimba. She died in hospital 3 hours later, her relatives blamed Prime Minister Khashba for her death. First Deputy Prime Minister Astamur Tarba then ordered the guards and special forces nearby to stand down, which left the Presidential building under control of Bagapsh's supporters. After a short celebration with liquor found inside the building, most of them left again, leaving just guards at the offices. At 5pm, Bagapsh arrived in the palace accompanied by Khajimba, and the two held a half-hour meeting in the Prime Minister's office. After the meeting, Khajimba left and Bagapsh addressed his supporters, stating:

"We are one people and we will make a common front against all our enemies. We are not planning to pursue anyone. Enough shake-ups. Raul Khajimba is my younger friend, he is my younger brother, and we will work together."

Afterwards, control over the Presidential building was handed over to the police, as Bagapsh's supporters retreated to the surrounding area which they continued to guard with a few dozen people.

The taking of the Presidential building by Bagapsh's supporters split government's opinions. President Ardzinba and Prime Minister Khashba condemned it as "an armed coup", and Khashba refused to enter the building on Monday 15 November in protest of the continued presence of armed supporters of Bagapsh. The actions were also condemned by Alexander Yakovenko, spokesman for the Russian Ministry for Foreign Affairs, who described them as "an attempt at forcefully seizing power by the supporters of one presidential candidate", denouncing it as "illegal, forceful actions" and warning that it threatened the stability in Abkhazia and across the region as a whole. In contrast, more than half of government staff did show up for work 15 November, among whom Vice President Valery Arshba. Leader of Aitaira Leonid Lakerbaia denied that a coup had taken place – no one had seized power, since Bagapsh had been elected President, confirmed by both the Electoral Commission and the Supreme Court.

On 5 December the presidential candidates Sergei Bagapsh and Raul Khadjimba agreed to hold new elections. In these elections they would run on a joint ticket, with Khadjimba as vice presidential candidate. The new elections were won by Bagapsh.

These elections were not recognized by any State and International Organizations.

=== Long-term consequences ===
On 2 June 2005, United Abkhazia held its third party conference. The socio-political movement decided to revoke the memberships of Minister for Foreign Affairs Sergei Shamba, who had founded and become head of the Social-Democratic Party of Abkhazia, of former Prime Minister Nodar Khashba, of former Deputy Prime Minister Viktor Khilchevsky and of member of Parliament Albert Kapikian.
