= Kyarazaa =

Kyarazaa Кьаразаа
- Leader: Dmitri Dbar
- Founded: 12 February 2016

Website
- Kyarazaa

Kyarazaa (Abkhaz: Кьаразаа) is a public organisation in Abkhazia, founded on 23 February 2016 in opposition to the Government of President Khajimba. It is headed by Dmitri Dbar, who had been dismissed as Sukhumi's police chief in May 2015 after two confrontations between members of the police and the State Security Service. Its target group is young people and its stated aim is to consolidate society and strengthen Abkhazian statehood. On 2 March, it voiced its support for the planned referendum to hold an early presidential election. The referendum, held in July, ultimately failed due to low turnout after a boycott by both government and opposition supporters.

On 6 December, Kyarazaa, along with Aitaira, signed a cooperation agreement with the Bloc of Opposition Forces.
