= Valeri Gurjua =

Abkhazian politician and judge

Valeri Gurjua was Head of Abkhazia's Arbitration Court from its founding in 1996 until 1 February 2013, when he was granted resignation due to reaching the age limit of 65 years. He was also a member of the First Convocation of the People's Assembly (1992–1996).
