= 2007 Abkhazian parliamentary election =

- 4 March 2007; 18 March 2007
- All 35 seats in the People's Assembly; 18 seats needed for a majority
- Turnout: 47.25%
Party	Leader	Seats	+/–
Pro-Government Independents (Bagapsh supporters)		28	New
Opposition Independents (Khadjimba supporters)		7	New
This lists parties that won seats. See the complete results below.

Parliamentary elections were held in Abkhazia on 4 March 2007, with a second round in seventeen constituencies on 18 March.

== Electoral system ==
The 35 members of the People's Assembly were elected in single-member constituencies using the two-round system. A total of 189 polling stations were used for the elections, with 129,650 registered voters.

== Campaign ==
A total of 136 candidates were nominated, including 26 MPs. The Community Party was the only party to formally nominate candidates, with all other candidates nominated by initiative groups. The Central Election Commission approved the registration of 130 candidates, of which 22 withdrew before election day. They included 92 Abkhazians, 10 Armenians, 5 Georgians, 4 Russians and one Ukrainian. President Sergei Bagapsh stressed the necessity of having a multi-ethnic parliament, where all the minorities were represented. He also stated that the prevailing issue of the election campaign was achieving international recognition for the de facto independent state.

Three parties supported Bagapsh; the United Abkhazia, Aitaira and Amtsakhara, whilst the Forum of Abkhaz People’s Unity supported Vice President Raul Khadjimba.

== Results ==
Of the 35 elected members, 28 supported President Bagapsh, seven the opposition. 26 were ethnic Abkhaz, three Russian, three Armenian, two Georgian and one Turkish. Voter turnout was 47.25% in the first round.

=== By district ===
District	Elected	Losing candidates		
District	Elected	Second round	First round	Withdrew
Sukhumi 1	Talix Kvatysh	Daur Achugba	Daur Nachkebia^{[P]}, Vladimir Kharania, Aida Ashuba	Gennadi Ardzinba, Abesalom Kvarchia
Sukhumi 2	Soner Gogua^{[P]}	Vitali Gabnia	Zaur Dopua, Suren Kerselyan, Temur Tabagua	Terenti Chania
Sukhumi 3	Rita Lolua	Emma Gamsonia^{[I]}^{[P]}	Iakub Lakoba	Garri Konjaria
Sukhumi 4	Batal Kobakhia	Viktor Khilchevski	Batal Arshba^{[I]}, Esmiralda Arshba, Vitali Aslandzia	Alkhas Manargia
Sukhumi 5	Lev Shamba^{[C]}	Akhra Bzhania	Eleonora Kogonia, Frida Lazba	
Sukhumi 6	Irina Agrba^{[P]}		Givi Gabnia, Konstantin Pilia^{[I]}	Leila Dzyba, Vadim Cherkezia
Sukhumi 7	Pavel Leshchuk^{[I]}^{[P]}	Vladimir Arshba	Nodari Nachkebia	
Pitsunda 8	Roman Benia^{[P]}	Almasbei Kchach	Dona Malia, Fedor-Tengiz Gabunia, Davlet Pilia	
Macharsky 9	Valeri Bganba	Roman Ketia	Badra Aiba, Batal Khagush^{[I]}, Gocha Jalagonia	
Gagra 10	Amra Agrba	Rauf Tsimtsba^{[P]}	Vadim Smyr	Shota Bagatelia^{[C]}
Gagra 11	Valeri Kondakov^{[C]}^{[I]}^{[P]}			Aleksei Romanenko, Vitali Azhiba, Arkadi Sarkisyan
Gantiadi 12	Valeri Mayromyan^{[P]}		Galust Trapizonyan^{[I]}	Lyudmila Gumba
Otharskomnu 13	Garik Samanba^{[I]}^{[P]}	Marina Bartsits^{[I]}	Fedor Sakania	Georgi Agrba, Beslan Dbar, Timur Zantaria
Duripshskomu 14	Guram Gumba^{[P]}	Dmitri Ardzinba	Vianor Tania, Juma Gabunia	Kesou Khagba^{[I]}
Lykhny 15	Mikhail Sangulia	Remzik Chirikbaia	Konstantin Ozgan^{[C]}^{[I]}^{[P]}	
Gudauta 16	Vladimir Nachach-Ogly^{[C]}^{[I]}^{[P]}		Garigin Taxmazyan, Vitali Darmava, Nodar Shakryl	
Aatsin 17	Viacheslav Tsugba^{[C]}^{[I]}^{[P]}		Anatoli Otyrba, Valeri Khagba, Valeri Avidzba	
Athos 18	Vitali Smyr		Aslan Bartsits^{[I]}, Anri Jergenia	
Esherskomu 19	Lev Avidzba	Svetlana Jergenia	Viktor Tvanba^{[P]}	Emma Khvartskia
Gumista 20	Albert Ovsepyan^{[I]}^{[P]}	Farad Mikaelyan	Larisa Adleiba, Vartan Kushchyan	Ervant Minasyan
Baslat 21	Valeri Kvarchia		Erkan Kutarba^{[P]}	
Pshap 22	Sergei Matosyan		Albert Kapikyan^{[I]}, Ruslan Khojava	Robert Yaylyan
Machar 23	Viktor Vasilev^{[P]}		Aleksei Vashchenko, Gennadi Nikitchenko^{[I]}	
Dranda 24	Adgur Kharazia		Aleksei Lataria	
Baslahuskomu 25	Yuri Zuchba^{[P]}	Emma Khojava	Arkadi Jinjia (Lena	Slavik Kuchuberia, Lena Gunia
Chlou 26	Zaur Adleiba^{[P]}		Beslan Butba^{[I]}	
Kutoli 27	Nugzar Ashuba^{[I]}^{[P]}		Appolon Gurgulia	
Atar 28	Temur Kvitsinia Paatovich^{[P]}		Temur Kvitsinia Konstantinovich	
Ochamchire 29	Beslan Jopua^{[C]}^{[I]}^{[P]}			
Tkvarcheli 30	Daur Arshba		Ilia Gamisonia^{[I]}^{[P]}	
Tkvarcheli 31	Aleksandr Chengelia		Jambulat Arshba^{[P]}	Patiko Alan
Uakum 32	Omari Kvarchia^{[P]}		Ivan Zarandia	
Chuburkhinji 33	Yuri Kereselidze^{[I]}^{[P]}		Akhra Kvekveskiri, Teimuraz Jishkariani	
Gali 34	Viacheslav Vardania^{[I]}^{[P]}	Nodik Kvitsinia	Tsiza Gumba	
Shashikvarskomu 35	Bezhan Ubiria^{[P]}	Ramin Chekheria	Tamaz Shonia, Beslan Kantaria	
Source: Regnum (candidates), Apsnypress (results), Apsnypress (affiliations)

^{C} Communist Party nominee

^{I} Incumbent

^{P} Backed by pro-presidential parties

== Reactions ==
Neither Georgia nor the EU recognised the elections citing a lack of participation by Georgian refugees.

== See also ==
- 4th convocation of the People's Assembly of Abkhazia
