= Armenians in Abkhazia =

Ethnic group in Abkhazia

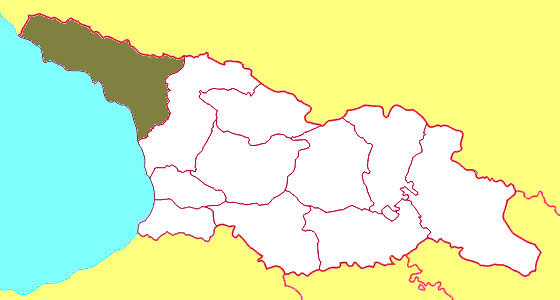
- Abkhazia region in Georgia (contested by Russia, Venezuela, Nicaragua, Nauru, Syria, which suggest it is a sovereign state), dark colour.

Total population
- 41,907 (2011, census)

Regions with significant populations
- Sukhumi District; Gulripshi District; Gagra District

Languages
- Armenian (Homshetsi dialect)

Religion
- Armenian Apostolic Church

Related ethnic groups
- Armenians in Georgia; Cherkesogai; Armenians in Russia

The Armenians in Abkhazia form the second largest ethnic group in Abkhazia after the native Abkhazians. Armenians settled in Abkhazia in the late 19th and early 20th centuries and are now the largest ethnic group in Sukhumi, Gulripshi and Gagra Districts forming 20% of the Abkhazian population with approximately 42,000 out of a total of 242,862.

== History ==
Although a few Armenians lived in Abkhazia in the Middle Ages, significant Armenian immigration to Abkhazia began in the late 19th century when much of Abkhazia became depopulated due to the exodus of many Abkhaz of Muslim descent to the Ottoman Empire after the Russian crackdown on the rebellion in Abkhazia; at the same time anti-Armenian pogroms started in Turkey and the attitude of the Porte towards its Armenian subjects became increasingly more brutal. More Armenians came to Abkhazia in the 1910s fleeing the Armenian genocide.

During the 1992–1993 War in Abkhazia most of the Armenians remained neutral for a long time, but as Georgian attacks on their settlements increased, they increasingly opted to support Abkhazians and Some fought on their side. Armenians made up a quarter of the Abkhaz army; 242 were killed in battle. Armenian population declined after the war as many Armenians left the country (mainly for Russia and Armenia) due to the economic hardships. Armenians have become the largest ethnic group in Sukhumi, Gulripshi and Gagra Districts following the displacement of ethnic Georgians from these areas.

== Demography ==
The earliest reliable records for Abkhazia are the Family Lists compiled in 1886 (published 1893 in Tbilisi), according to which the Sukhum District's population was 69,000 of which 28,000 were Abkhaz. The Armenians in that list totalled 1,090.

According to the 1897 census there were 58,697 people in Abkhazia who listed Abkhaz as their mother tongue. There were about 1,500 Armenians in the Sukhumi district (Abkhazia) at that time; its total population was nearly 100,000.

Armenians in Abkhazia by districts in 2011

District (or city)	Armenians	%	Total population
Gagra	15,422	38.3	40,217
Gulripshi District (excluding Kodori Valley)	8,430	46.8	18,032
Sukhumi District	6,467	56.1	11,531
City of Sukhumi	6,192	9.8	62,914
Gudauta	3,667	10	36,775
Ochamchira	1,647	6.6	24,868
Tkvarcheli	56	0.3	16,012
Gali	26	0.1	30,356
Abkhazia	41,907	17.4	240,705

The Russian, Armenian and Georgian population grew faster than Abkhaz, due to the large-scale migration enforced especially during the rule of Joseph Stalin and Lavrentiy Beria.

The following table summarises the results of the other censuses carried out in Abkhazia.

Year	Armenians	Total
1926	13.8% (25,677)	186,004
1939	15.9% (49,705)	311,885
1959	15.9% (64,425)	404,738
1970	15.4% (74,850)	486,959
1979	15.1% (73,350)	486,082
1989	14.6% (76,541)	525,061
2003 ^{***}	20.8% (44,870)	215,972
2011	17.4% (41,907)	240,705

^*** The Georgian authorities did not acknowledge the results of this census and consider it illegitimate. At the same time, the Abkhaz authorities have been accused by local Armenian NGOs of intentionally decreasing the number of Abkhazian-Armenians.

== Language ==
The majority of Armenians in Abkhazia speak the Homshetsi dialect of Armenian, which is sometimes written in the Cyrillic script. Additionally schools in Abkhazia teach both Western and Eastern varieties of Armenian. Though many people tend to speak Russian outside the home.

== Religion ==
Armenians in Abkhazia are predominantly followers of the Armenian Apostolic Church. In 1992 the Chapel of St. Hripsime (Armenian: Սուրբ Հռիփսիմե մատուռ) was built in Gagra and in 2013 The Holy Savior Church of Gagra (Armenian: Գագրայի Սուրբ Ամենափրկիչ եկեղեցի ) was opened, which is a cathedral of the Armenian Apostolic Church. Sizable segment of Armenians also profess Eastern Orthodoxy, due to the lack of Armenian churches in Abkhazia during the Soviet period. A small minority of Catholic Armenians also exists.

== Politics ==
There are ethnic Armenians in the People's Assembly of Abkhazia and Armenian-language schools in Abkhazia. However, Armenians are under-represented in the Assembly as the number of the parliamentarians of this ethnicity is less than their share in the republic population. The Council of Armenian Community of Abkhazia has complained over "negative attitude to Armenian population" and has expressed concerns over the distribution of anti-Armenian leaflets, as well as an attempt of sabotage at a Sukhumi Armenian secondary school in 2006.

In 2007, the Georgian media began running several stories on the parliamentary elections in Abkhazia, claiming that ethnic Armenians in the area, who make up roughly 20% of the local population, would be controlling the elections.

== See also ==
- Bagramyan Battalion
- The Armenian community of Abkhazia
- Suren Kerselyan
- Galust Trapizonyan
- Albert Ovsepyan
- Sergei Matosyan
