= Russian Citizens Union =

The Russian Citizens Union (Russian: Конгресс русских общин соотечественников России в Абхазии, KROSRA) is a political party and organization in Abkhazia which unites local Russian communities and organizations. It was founded in 1994 and is led by Gennady Vasilyevich Nikitchenko, a member of the People's Assembly of Abkhazia.

In the past, the organization has taken a stance in opposition to the government. The newspaper of the organization is Russian Word (Russian: Русское слово).
