= Batal Kobakhia =

Abkhaz archaeologist and public figure

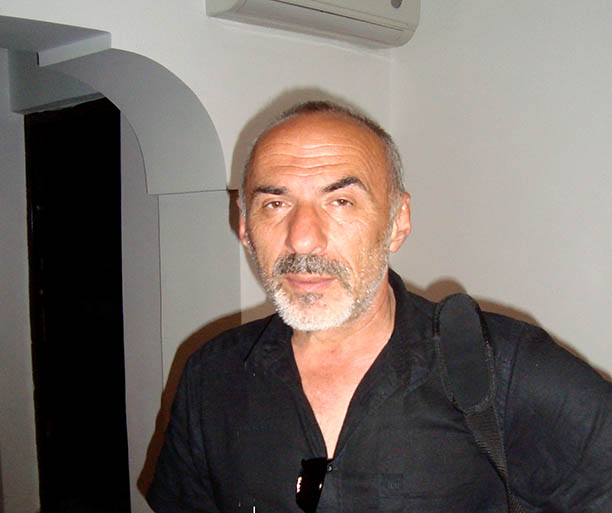
Batal Kobakhia

Batal Samsonovich Kobakhia (Russian: Батал Самсонович Кобахия; born 18 August 1955, Sukhumi, Georgia) is an Abkhaz archaeologist and public figure; The deputy of 4th convocation (2007-2012), chairman of the committee for Human Rights and Rule of Law.
