= Sergei Dbar =

Abkhazian military commander

Sergei Platonovich Dbar was a prominent military leader of Abkhazia.

Dbar was born on 2 May 1946 in the village of Mgudzyrkhua in the Gudauta District. After a career in the Soviet Army, Dbar became one of Abkhazia's military leaders in the 1992-1993 war with Georgia. On 21 May 1993, he was appointed Chief of Staff and promoted to the rank of Major General. After the war, on 30 December 1993, he was promoted to the rank of Lieutenant General. On 27 September 1994, he was awarded the title Hero of Abkhazia. On 30 August 1995, he was made Deputy Minister of Defence. In June 1996, he retired from the army, becoming Advisor to the President the next month.

Sergei Dbar was elected the first chairman of the war veterans organisation Amtsakhara during its founding congress on 31 March 1999. In July 2001, Dbar was dismissed as Presidential Advisor due to budget cuts, but during the 2001 Kodori crisis, Dbar re-entered the army, becoming Commander of the Northern Group of Forces.

Sergei Dbar was elected to Parliament for constituency no. 13 in the 2 March 2002 elections. He was elected Vice-Speaker, but on 27 June, he died of a heart attack.
