= 1999 Abkhazian constitutional referendum =

A constitutional referendum was held in Abkhazia on 3 October 1999, alongside presidential elections. Voters were asked whether they approved of the constitution that had been approved by the Supreme Soviet on 26 November 1994, together with an amendment abolishing the life term for appointed judges and replacing it with five year terms. It was approved by 97.7% of voters. However, ethnic Georgians (200,000–250,000) who had been expelled from Abkhazia during the conflict of 1992–93 did not participate in the referendum and the results were not recognised internationally.

== Results ==
| Choice | Votes | % |
|---|---|---|
| For | | 97.7 |
| Against | | 2.3 |
| Invalid/blank votes | | – |
| Total | | 100 |
| Registered voters/turnout | 219,534 | 87.6 |
Source: RRC

== Aftermath ==
Following the referendum, the Abkhazian government passed the Act of State Independence of the Republic of Abkhazia on 12 October.
