= Emma Gamisonia =

Abkhazian politician

- Born: Emma Alekseevna Gamisonia
- Education: Moscow State University (PhD)
- Occupations: Politician, Scholar
- Known for: Vice-Speaker of the People's Assembly of Abkhazia (2012–2017)

Emma Alekseevna Gamisonia (Russian: Эмма Алексеевна Гамисония) is a politician and scholar from Abkhazia. A member of the People's Assembly of Abkhazia for fifteen years, she served as Vice-Speaker of the Parliament and currently heads the Department of Political Science and Sociology at the Abkhazian State University.

== Early life and education ==
Gamisonia was educated at the Moscow Regional Pedagogical Institute (named after Krupskaya) from 1978 to 1983. She later attended postgraduate studies at Lomonosov Moscow State University (MSU) from 1993 to 1995. In May 1995, she successfully defended her dissertation at MSU titled "Environmental Problems and the Women's Movement in Russia," earning a Candidate of Philosophical Sciences degree (PhD equivalent) specializing in political culture and ideology.

== Career ==
=== Teaching and academia ===
From 1985 to 1989, Gamisonia worked as a teacher and deputy director of the Chkhortol Secondary School. Since 1995, she has been a member of the faculty at Abkhazian State University, where she serves as an associate professor and the Head of the Department of Political Science and Sociology. Her academic work focuses on ethnopolitics, conflict studies, and the development of parliamentarism in Abkhazia.

=== Politics ===
Gamisonia was first elected to the People's Assembly of Abkhazia in the election of 2002. Her name was initially included among the members of the political party Republic at the time of its formation, although she later clarified this had been done without her knowledge.

She was returned to the Assembly in the elections of 2007 and 2012, becoming the only woman to win a seat in the latter body. She served as Vice-Speaker of the Parliament from 2012 until 2017.

In 2016, as the only woman serving in the Assembly, she was one of only two lawmakers to vote against a total ban on abortion. In 2017, she spoke critically of the 2008 gender equality law, noting that while its goals were laudable, the legislation remained ineffective in practice. Gamisonia has also expressed diplomatic support for the Republic of Artsakh.

== Selected publications ==
- Ecological problems and the women's movement in Russia (Monograph), 1995.
- "State and modern problems of Abkhazian parliamentarism", Bulletin No. 7, Vladikavkaz, 2009.
- Political Science (Textbook in the Abkhaz language), ASU, 2010.
- "New and important aspects of Russian-Abkhazian relations", Alagala No. 6, 2011.
- "Traditions of parliamentarism and inter-parliamentary dialogue in the formation of modern Abkhazian statehood", Sochi, 2017.
