= Kesou Khagba =

Abkhazian politician (born 1950)

Kesou Khagba was the Representative of the President of Abkhazia in Ukraine from 1992 to 1995. From 1995 to 1999, Khagba was Minister of Culture and from 2000 to 2004, a Deputy of the People's Assembly of Abkhazia. He co-founded the newspaper Novy Den. Khagba was born in 1950 in the village Duripsh in Gudauta District.
