= 1994 Abkhazian presidential election =

Indirect presidential elections were held in Abkhazia for the first time on 26 November 1994. Vladislav Ardzinba was elected President, and was inaugurated on 6 December.
