= Nugzar Ashuba =

Abkhazian politician

Nugzar Nuri-ipa Ashuba

Minister of Culture of Abkhazia
- In office 1986–1992

1st Chairman of the State Committee for Repatriation
- In office 1992–1995
- Succeeded by: Fenia Avidzba

2nd Speaker of the People's Assembly of Abkhazia
- In office 3 April 2002 – 2012
- Preceded by: Sokrat Jinjolia
- Succeeded by: Valeri Bganba

Secretary of the Security Council of Abkhazia
- In office 29 October 2013 – 4 June 2014
- President: Alexander Ankvab
- Preceded by: Stanislav Lakoba

Personal details
- Born: March 2, 1952 (age 74) Ghvada, Ochamchira District, Abkhazian ASSR, Georgian SSR, USSR
- Education: Georgian Polytechnic Institute

Nugzar Nuri-ipa Ashuba (Abkhaz: Нугзар Нури-иҧа Ашәба, Georgian: ნუგზარ აშუბა) is a senior politician from Abkhazia. He was Minister of Culture from 1986 until 1992 and the first Chairman of the State Repatriation Committee from 1992 until 1995. He was elected to the People's Assembly of Abkhazia in the 2002 elections, and he was elected Speaker on 3 April 2002 with 23 votes in favour, 10 against and 1 abstention. Ashuba was re-elected in 2007 both as Deputy and as Speaker, but suffered a first-round loss in the 2012 elections. When President Sergei Bagapsh died in 2011, and Vice President Alexander Ankvab participated in the subsequent Presidential election, Ashuba acted as President. On 29 October 2013, he was appointed Security Council Secretary by President Alexander Ankvab to succeed Stanislav Lakoba, who had been dismissed the previous day.

On 4 June 2014, following the forced resignation of Ankvab as President in the 2014 Abkhazian political crisis, Ashuba resigned as Security Council Secretary along with Presidential Administration Head Beslan Kubrava, accusing the opposition of carrying out a witch hunt and imposing its decisions on the interim authorities.

== Early life ==
Nugzar Ashuba was born on March 2, 1952, in the village of Ghvada, Ochamchira District, and is married with two children.

Political offices
Preceded by Sokrat Jinjolia	Speaker of the People's Assembly of Abkhazia; 2002 –2012	Succeeded by Valeri Bganba
