= Albert Ovsepyan =

Abkhazian politician (born 1938)

Vice Speaker of the People's Assembly of Abkhazia
- In office March 2006 – 3 May 2010
- Preceded by: Alexander Stranichkin
- Succeeded by: Sergei Matosyan

Personal details
- Born: January 13, 1938 (age 88) Parnaut, Abkhaz Autonomous Soviet Socialist Republic

Albert Ovsepyan (Note: The Abkhazian language employs a modified form of Cyrillic rather than Latin letters, and Ovsepyan's surname, written in Armenian script as Հովսեփյան, may also be transliterated as Ovsepian, Hovsepian, or Hovsepyan.) (Armenian: Ալբերտ Հովսեփյան; 13 January 1938) is an Armenian-Abkhazian politician, a member of the People's Assembly of Abkhazia and a former Vice-Speaker of the Assembly.

== Biography ==
Ovsepyan was born in Parnaut, a settlement in the Abkhaz Autonomous Soviet Socialist Republic. He graduated from Sukhumi Pedagogical Institute, spending most of his career as an educator. Ovsepyan was elected to the People's Assembly of Abkhazia at its thirteenth convocation. He became Vice-Speaker of the People's Assembly of Abkhazia in March 2006, replacing its previous vice-speaker, Alexander Stranichkin, who had nominated Ovsepyan.

On 3 May 2010, Ovsepyan retired from the post of Vice-Speaker on account of old age.
