= Alexander Stranichkin =

Abkhazian politician (born 1955)

Alexander Viktorovich Stranichkin (born 5 April 1955 in Chita, Zabaykalsky Krai) is an Abkhazian politician. A former vice-speaker of the People's Assembly of Abkhazia, Stranichkin currently serving as one of the four vice-premiers of the Republic of Abkhazia.

== Biography ==
Stranichkin was born in Chita on April 5, 1955. He studied in Rostov, embarking on a career path as an economist.

Stranichkin was first elected to the People's Assembly of Abkhazia (Parliament) in 1996 for its thirteenth session in 1997 and was re-elected to its fourteenth session in 2002. He was serving his second term in the Assembly when he was named as vice-premier by Sergei Bagapsh. He was replaced as vice-speaker by Albert Ovsepyan, with Stranichkin's support.

On 15 June 2012, Stranichkin was re-elected as head of the Russian Community of the Republic Abkhazia.
