= Communist Party of Abkhazia =

Communist Party of Abkhazia Аԥсны Акомунисттә Апартиа აფხაზეთის კომუნისტური პარტია
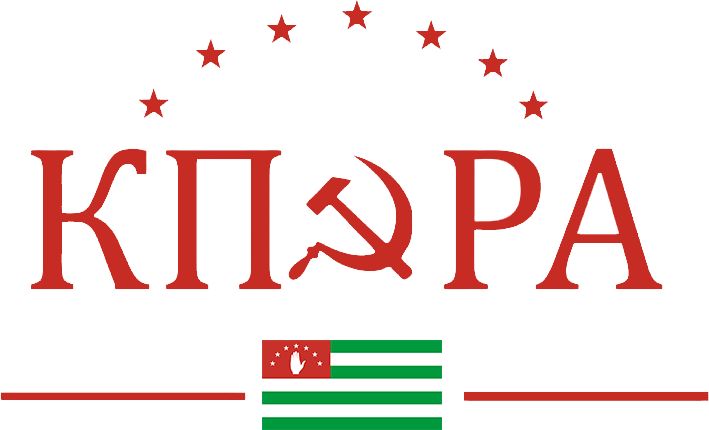
- Leader: Bebiya Bakur
- Founded: March 1921; 4 March 1995
- Headquarters: Sukhumi
- Membership (2025): 2600
- Ideology: Communism; Marxism–Leninism; Left-conservatism; Soviet patriotism
- Political position: Far-left
- International affiliation: IMCWP (Observer)
- Continental affiliation: UCP–CPSU
- Colours: Red
- People's Assembly: 0 / 35

The Communist Party of Abkhazia (CPA; Abkhaz: Аԥсны Акомунисттә Апартиа, romanized: Apsny Akomunisttw Apartia; Georgian: აფხაზეთის კომუნისტური პარტია, romanized: apkhazetis k'omunist'uri p'art'ia) is a political party in Abkhazia. Its current leader is Bebiya Bakur Sharbeevich.

== History ==
The CPA was founded in March 1921 with the demand of a separate Abkhaz Soviet Republic. It was then led by Efrem Eshba. Eshba had formed a Bolshevik military-revolutionary committee in Sukhumi in the summer of 1918. Eshba's group demanded direct integration of Abkhazia into the Soviet Union. During the Soviet period, the CPA was a part of the Communist Party of the Soviet Union. In 1988, the CPA demanded Abkhaz secession.

After the fall of the Soviet Union, the CPA was refounded as an independent party on 4 March 1995. In the nineties, it was led by Enver Kapba. During the first Presidential election of Abkhazia, in 1999, it supported President Ardzinba (who ran unopposed). During the Ardzinba era, it functioned as a loyal opposition party.

The CPA maintains close contacts with communist groups in Russia. It is affiliated to the Union of Communist Parties – Communist Party of the Soviet Union. However, unlike many of the other communist organisations in the region, the CPA has denounced the political legacy of Joseph Stalin.

The CPA planned to hold its 8th congress on 30 October 2013, and Lev Shamba announced that he planned to resign as leader, which he had been for eight years, but he was still Chairman by the time of the Party's twentieth anniversary in 2015.

On 29 February 2016, the Communist Party became a founding member of the Council for the National Unity of the Republic of Abkhazia, uniting political forces that were neither pro-government nor pro-opposition.

The current Chairman of the Communist Party of the Republic of Abkhazia is Bebiya Bakur Sharbeevich. Who is also chairperson of State Extra-Budgetary Fund for Social Insurance and Labour Protection of Abkhazia. This fund deals with demographic payments such as the payments made to parents of children born of Abkhaz ethnicity.

Party membership in 2025 was around 2600 members.
