= Leonid Lakerbaia =

Abkhazian politician (born 1947)

- Леонид Лакербаиа

10th Prime Minister of Abkhazia
- In office 27 September 2011 – 2 June 2014
- President: Alexander Ankvab
- Preceded by: Sergei Shamba
- Succeeded by: Vladimir Delba (Acting)

2nd Minister for Foreign Affairs of Abkhazia
- In office 29 June 1995 – 31 July 1996
- Prime Minister: Gennady Gagulia
- Preceded by: Sokrat Jinjolia
- Succeeded by: Konstantin Ozgan

Personal details
- Born: 1 January 1947 (age 79) Kutaisi, Georgian SSR, Soviet Union
- Party: Aitaira

Leonid Ivanovich Lakerbaia (Abkhaz: Леонид Иуан-иԥа Лакербаиа, romanized: Leonid Iwan-ipha Lakerbaia, Georgian: ლეონიდ ლაკერბაია; born 1 January 1947) is an Abkhazian politician who was the prime minister of Abkhazia in the Government of President Ankvab from 27 September 2011 until his resignation on 2 June 2014 following the 2014 Abkhazian political crisis. Lakerbaia is also chairman of the socio-political movement Aitaira (since 2001).

Before becoming prime minister, Lakerbaia was vice-premier and first vice-premier in the government of President Bagapsh (since 24 February 2005) and he was Minister for Foreign Affairs from 29 June 1995 until 31 July 1996 in the Government of President Ardzinba. Lakerbaia was nominated by the People's Party to stand in the 1999 Presidential election but was refused registration by the Central Election Commission, allowing President Vladislav Ardzinba to run unopposed for a second term.

Political offices
Preceded by Sokrat Jinjolia	Minister for Foreign Affairs; 1995–1996	Succeeded by Konstantin Ozgan
Preceded by Sergei Shamba	Prime Minister of Abkhazia; 2011–2014	Succeeded by Vladimir Delba; Acting
