= Aidgylara =

Socio-political movement in Abkhazia

The National Forum Aidgylara (Abkhaz: Аидгылара, Unity) is a socio-political movement in Abkhazia. It was founded during Perestroika as the ethno-nationalist movement representing the Abkhaz people. Aidgylara's founding congress took place on 13 December 1988 in the building of the Abkhazian State Philharmonic Orchestra, where the writer Alexey Gogua was elected its first Chairman.

On 18 March 1989, Aidgylara organised the mass gathering at the historical meeting place of Lykhny that demanded from the Soviet leadership the reversal of Abkhazia's 1931 Stalin-era incorporation into Georgia and restoration of full Republic status.

In 1989, Aidgylara also started publishing two newspapers, the eponymous Aidgylara and Edineniye, as well as the regional publication Bzyb in Gudauta District.

On Aidgylara's initiative, the founding congress of the Assembly of the Mountain Peoples of the Caucasus was held in Sukhumi on 25 and 26 August 1989.

Aidgylara's second congress was held on 3 February 1990, it elected Sergei Shamba to succeed Gogua as Chairman, as well as a board of 51 members.

On 31 May 1990, Aidgylara and the Assembly of Mountain Peoples organised a mass rally in Sukhumi, attended by 30000 people, including members of the Abkhazian and Circassians diasporas from Turkey, Syria, Jordan, Germany and the United States. On 22 September 1990, representatives of Aidgylara participated in a congress in Moscow of territories and peoples without full statehood. It also took part in the founding of Memorial and was a founding member of UNPO in February 1991.

In Abkhazia's conflict with Georgia, Aidgylara allied with the Armenian movement Krunk and the Russian movement Slavic House. On 6 March 1991, they formed the Union of Socio-Political Organisations, together with the Democratic Party, the Sukhumi Society of Internationalists and the People's Union Abkhazia. The Union organised a mass rally in Sukhumi on 10 March in support of Abkhazia's statehood and in anticipation of the New Union Treaty Referendum held on 17 March.

At the outbreak of the 1992–1993 war with Georgia, Aidgylara's acting Chairman was Rauf Ebzhnou.

Aidgylara was dissolved by its leadership in 1995.

On 15 August 2000, Zurab Achba, who had been Aidgylara's Deputy Chairman between 1990 and 1992, was shot dead in front of his house.

Aidgylara was reconstituted during a fourth congress held on 19 September 2003. In it, Valeri Kvarchia was elected Aidgylara's new Chairman, and Ivan Tarba and Oktai Chkotua Deputy Chairmen. On 17 December 2008, a congress was held in Sukhumi to celebrate Aidgylara's 20th anniversary, which was attended by Russia's Ambassador to Abkhazia Semyon Grigoryev.
