= Aitaira =

Aitaira Аиҭаира
- Leader: Leonid Lakerbaia; Akhra Kvekveskiri
- Founded: 2001 2016 (re-established)
- Headquarters: Sokhumi, Abkhazia
- Ideology: Anti-Khajimba; Abkhaz nationalism Russophilia
- People's Assembly: 1 / 35 (3%)

Aitaira (Abkhaz: Аиҭаира; lit. Revival) is a public association in Abkhazia. It is co-chaired by former prime minister Leonid Lakerbaia.

== History ==
Aitaira was originally a socio-political movement in opposition to the Government of President Ardzinba, co-chaired by former Foreign Minister Leonid Lakerbaia, founded around 2001. It backed Alexander Ankvab in the 2004 presidential election, but upon his exclusion from the race by the Central Election Commission, Aitaira joined United Abkhazia and Amtsakhara in supporting Sergei Bagapsh. After the crisis that followed the election, Bagapsh became President of Abkhazia in the 2005 compromise election, Ankvab was appointed prime minister and Lakerbaia vice premier. In subsequent years, Aitaira slowly ceased its activity, despite reporting in January 2009 that it would continue as before.

Ankvab was elected president in 2011, following the death of Bagapsh, and appointed Lakerbaia as prime minister. Both were forced from office in the May 2014 revolution, after which Raul Khajimba, whom Bagapsh had defeated in 2004, was elected president.

On 27 July 2016, Lakerbaia revived Aitaira as a public association, in opposition to the Government of President Khajimba, becoming its co-chairman along with People's Assembly deputy Akhra Kvekveskiri. On 6 December, Aitaira, along with Kyarazaa, signed a cooperation agreement with the Bloc of Opposition Forces.
