= Garik Samanba =

Abkhaz politician

Garik Samanba (Abkhaz: Гаррик Саманба; born 1957) is an Abkhaz politician. Samanba is a member of the Parliament of Abkhazia, fought in the War in Abkhazia (1992–1993), and is recognized as a national hero of Abkhazia. Samanba has served as Chairman of the Defense and National Security Committee of the Abkhazian Parliament, being reelected to this post on April 5, 2007, following a reelection to his parliamentary seat in March.

As a war veteran and political candidate, Samanba has campaigned on prioritizing support for the families of Abkhazian war casualties, such as state support for tuition funding for the children of war veterans.

== See also ==
- Government of the Republic of Abkhazia
- Politics of Abkhazia
