= Apsny (political party) =

Political party in Abkhazia

Apsny (Abkhaz: Аԥсны, lit. 'Abkhazia') is a political party in Abkhazia.

== First period (until 2005) ==
Apsny was founded as a social movement in the 1990s, but was transformed into a political party in February 2001. It elected as its co-chairmen member of the People's Assembly Maia Agrba and Rushni Jopua and as its Executive Secretary Nugzar Agrba.

Serving as the principal pro-government formation, Apsny supported Raul Khajimba in the 2004 presidential election.

On 8 February 2005, Apsny formed, with eleven smaller parties and movements, the Forum for the National Unity of Abkhazia. Apsny ceased to function independently thereafter.

== Refoundation (since 2016) ==
On 19 May 2016, Apsny was refounded as a political party with a congress held at the hotel Atrium Viktoria. Among the members of the initiative group were former leader Nugzar Agrba and former Deputy Chairman of the Party for the Economic Development of Abkhazia and professor Givi Gabnia.
