= United Abkhazia =

United Abkhazia Аԥсны Акзаара Единая Абхазия
- Leader: Sergei Shamba
- Founded: March 25, 2004
- Ideology: Social conservatism Republicanism
- Political position: Centre-right
- Colours: Red
- People's Assembly: 0 / 35

Website
- http://www.rpp-ea.org/

United Abkhazia (Abkhaz: Аԥсны Акзаара, Russian: Единая Абхазия) is a political party in Abkhazia. United Abkhazia was founded on March 25, 2004, as a socio-political movement, with the specific goal of presenting a single opposition candidate for the October 2004 presidential elections.

It entered into an alliance with the Amtsakhara and Aitaira movements and the Federation of Independent Trade Unions and they named former Prime Minister Sergei Bagapsh as their joint candidate on July 20, 2004. Bagapsh won the elections by a small margin, but new elections were held because of a dispute over the results with runner up, former Prime Minister Raul Khadjimba. Bagapsh and Khadjimba agreed to run together on a national unity ticket and won the rerun election in 2005.

== History ==
Artur Mikvabia, chairman of United Abkhazia since it had first been created, announced 25 July 2007 that he would resign his post and retire from politics, but members of the party stated that they would not accept this, and Mikvabia remained chairman.

In 2008, United Abkhazia signed a cooperation agreement with Russian party United Russia.

On 27 January 2009, almost five years after its foundation, United Abkhazia was transformed into a political party. Daur Tarba, who had headed the Ochamchira District before, became the new chairman, Alkhas Kardava First Deputy Chairman and Zurab Kajaia Deputy Chairman.

United Abkhazia held its fourth congress on 27 January 2012, which was attended by 359 delegates, and during which 11 candidates for the upcoming Parliamentary elections were chosen (the maximum number allowed).

At its fifth congress, held on 12 June 2013 and attended by 330 delegates, United Abkhazia decided to pass into the opposition, with Tarba stating that President Ankvab, whose candidacy the party had supported in 2011, had failed to deliver meaningful achievements.

On 10 July 2013, United Abkhazia signed a cooperation agreement with fellow opposition parties and a number of social movements, forming the Coordinating Council of Political Parties and Public Organisations.

Daur Tarba resigned as Chairman of United Abkhazia on 1 October 2015 in a letter to its political council, in which he identified excessive formalism and a lack of internal political debates, and called for the party's rejuvenation. The political council accepted his resignation and appointed Aleksei Tania as acting chairman. The following day, Tamaz Khashba, Spartak Kapba and Aleksandr Tsyshba, Chairmen of the Tkvarcheli, Ochamchira and Gagra regional branches reacted to the announcement by also resigning.

On 27 January 2016, United Abkhazia held its sixth congress, which was attended by 375 delegates. It elected MP and former Prime Minister Sergei Shamba as its chairman, as well as MP Robert Yaylyan, jurist Viktor Vasiliev and Dato Kajaia as deputy chairmen and 43 members of its political council. It was said in the sidelines of the congress that Tarba had stepped down so as to make room for his long-time friend Shamba. During the congress, some speakers criticised the government and on 9 February, United Abkhazia announced that it was leaving the Coordinating Council of Political Parties and Public Organisations, claiming that its role had been marginalised by the government. United Abkhazia proceeded to initiate, together with the Party for the Economic Development of Abkhazia, the Council for the National Unity of the Republic of Abkhazia, uniting political forces neither pro-government nor pro-opposition, which was formally established on 29 February.

On 8 July 2016, United Abkhazia signed a cooperation agreement with South Ossetian party United Ossetia.

On 5 December 2016, United Abkhazia's political council deliberated about the confrontation between the government and the opposition, and in particular Amtsakhara's call for President Raul Khajimba to resign by 15 December. A proposal by Gagra party branch Head Teimuraz Khishba to call upon Khajimba to resign to reduce tension received support only from the party's Deputy Chairman Data Kajaia and Gudauta party branch Head Vitali Jenia. Khishba subsequently resigned as party branch head.

== Election results ==
=== Presidential ===
Year	Candidate	First round	Second round	Result
2004	Sergei Bagapsh	50.08%	-	Won
2005	Sergei Bagapsh	91.54%	-	Won
2009	Sergei Bagapsh	61.16%	-	Won
2011	Alexander Ankvab	54.90%	-	Won
2014	Raul Khajimba	50.60%	-	Won
2019	Alkhas Kvitsinia	24.26%	47.46%	Lost
2020	Aslan Bzhania	58.92%	-	Won
2025	Badra Gunba	47.76%	55.66%	Won

=== Parliamentary ===
People's Assembly
Election year	Seats	+/–	Government
2002	15 / 35		Government
2007	28 / 35	▲13	Government
2012	3 / 35	▼25	Opposition
