= Amtsakhara =

Amtsakhara Амцахара
- Leader: Alexey Tsugba
- Founders: Sergei Dbar; Vladimir Nachach; Aki Ardzinba; Garik Samanba
- Founded: 31 March 1999 (veretans' association) 2002 (political association) 27 June 2013 (political party)
- Ideology: Abkhazian nationalism Russophilia; Anti-Georgian sentiment
- Political position: Right-wing
- Colours: Red
- People's Assembly: 5 / 35 (14%)

Website
- www.amtsakhara.org

Amtsakhara (Abkhaz: Амцахара, lit. 'Ancestral Lights') is a political party in Abkhazia.

== Foundation ==
On 31 March 1999, Amtsakhara was founded on the initiative of Sergei Dbar, Vladimir Nachach, Aki Ardzinba and Garik Samanba and a number of others as a public organisation uniting veterans of the 1992–1993 war with Georgia. During its founding congress, Dbar was elected its first Chairman, which he remained until 2001. In 2002, Amtsakhara was transformed into a socio-political movement and Nachach and Mirab Kishmaria became its co-Chairmen.

== Prior to 2004 ==
Although originally formed as an association for veterans, Amtsakhara broadened its membership to include the wider community. Before Amtsakhara, the only notable opposition group had been the Aitaira movement. Amtsakhara managed to take over the leadership of the opposition, empowered by its core of veterans. In the years leading up to 2004, Amtsakhara lobbied for reform of the government, including a greater balance of powers between the branches of government, and in particular, an increase in the powers of Abkhazian lawmakers. They were also successful in changing the procedure for amending the Constitution.

Amtsakhara was largely responsible for bringing down the government of Prime Minister Gennady Gagulia in 2003. This was the first time that a government had been forced to resign due to public pressure, rather than being sacked by President Vladislav Ardzinba. Amtsakhara had lashed out at Gagulia for being inefficient and weak on crime, and public anger had boiled over at its congress. They had also threatened to organize a national rally if Gagulia did not step down.

As perhaps the only opposition group with the capability to challenge the Abkhazian government, they were threatened at various times. On April 19, 2003, their office was bombed, although there were no casualties. Two of their activists died in a car bombing, which they accused the authorities of being complicit in. In June 2004, Garri Aiba, one of Amtsakhara's leaders was shot dead while driving through the city. As a result, foreign minister and fellow Amtsakhara leader Sergei Shamba resigned in protest.

During 2003 and early 2004, Amtsakhara lobbied for President Ardzinba to step down. In late 2003, they had asked parliament to come up with a means for impeaching him by mid-December, but this did not occur.

== 2004 Presidential election ==
Amtsakhara intended to challenge the ruling party at the October 2004 Presidential election, when Ardzinba was forced by the Constitution to step down.

Their chances of winning the 2004 elections initially suffered a blow in April 2004, when several other opposition politicians combined to form the United Abkhazia alliance. However, in June 2004, Amtsakhara and United Abkhazia agreed to form a combined front at the elections, after the Aiba assassination. On July 20, 2004, they named former prime minister Sergei Bagapsh as their presidential candidate, ending rumors that they may put up multiple candidates due to their prior lack of a clear leader.

== Since 2013 ==
On 27 June 2013, Amtsakhara held a congress in which it transformed itself into a fully fledged political party, elected as its chairmen Garik Samanba and Otar Lomia, and as its Deputy Chairmen Vitali Tarnava and Ramaz Jopua.

Following the May 2014 Revolution, Amtsakhara held an extraordinary congress on 18 July, in which it condemned the events and nominated Security Service Chairman Aslan Bzhania for President in the August election. It held an extraordinary congress on 7 November to discuss the proposed Treaty on Alliance and Integration with Russia.

On 22 May 2015, Amtsakhara held its fifth congress. Co-Chairman Samanba sharply criticised the government and stated that Amtsakhara was now Abkhazia's sole opposition party. The congress unanimously called upon president Raul Khajimba to appoint a member of the opposition to the post of Prime Minister and approved a change to its leadership structure, reducing its number of Chairmen from three to one. On 4 June, the party's Political Council decided that Co-Chairman Alkhas Kvitsinia should take over as sole leader and elected him as the council's chairman. On 21 October, at Amtsakhara's sixth congress, it confirmed this decision by electing Kvitsinia as the party's Chairman. It also adopted a resolution calling on President Raul Khajimba to resign.

On 3 March 2016, Amtsakhara expressed its support for the planned referendum to hold an early presidential election. After President Raul Khajimba approved the referendum and set its date to be 10 July, Amtsakhara planned a congress for 5 July. The congress had been planned to be held at the State Philharmonic, but the participants found the building locked, and decided to hold the congress in the adjacent park, with a one-hour delay as the electricity had been switched off. The congress adopted several demands, including the dismissal of Interior Minister Leonid Dzapshba and the postponement of the referendum to the Autumn. Participants then moved to the Interior Ministry to reiterate their demands. Despite pleas by Chairman Alkhas Kvitsinia not to violate the Ministry building, a number of activists tried to break through the security cordon, including by throwing stones, bricks and molotov cocktails. As a result of the violence, nineteen security officers were injured, of which nine had to be hospitalised.

On 30 November 2016, Amtsakhara held its 7th congress, in which it listed a number of complaints against the authorities, among which that it had sabotaged the recall referendum. The congress called upon President Raul Khajimba to resign by 15 December, failing which it would organise a 'People's Assembly' on that date.
