= Vladislav Ardzinba =

Soviet-Abkhaz politician; President of Abkhazia (1945-2010)

- Владислав Арӡынба
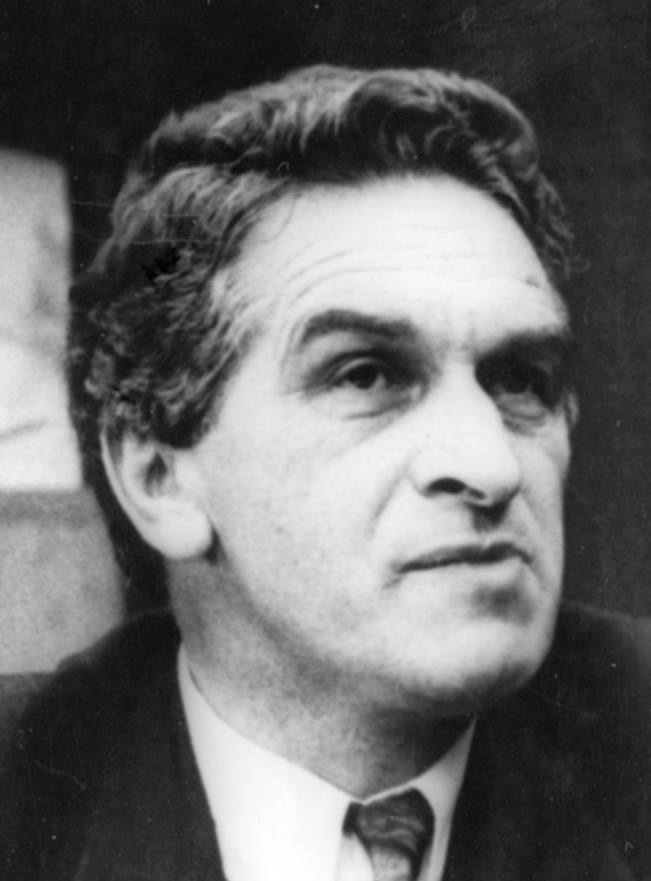
- Ardzinba in 1996

1st President of Abkhazia
- In office 26 November 1994 –: 12 February 2005; (10 years, 78 days)
- Vice President: Valery Arshba
- Preceded by: Office established
- Succeeded by: Sergei Bagapsh

First Secretary of the Communist Party of Abkhazia
- In office 8 November 1990 –: 27 December 1991; (1 year, 49 days)

Chairman of the Supreme Soviet of Abkhazia
- In office 1990–1994

Deputy of the Supreme Soviet
- In office 1987–1989

Personal details
- Born: 14 May 1945 Lower Eshera, Sukhumi District, Abkhazian ASSR, Georgian SSR, USSR
- Died: 4 March 2010 (aged 64) Moscow, Russia
- Party: Apsny
- Spouse: Svetlana Jergenia

Vladislav Ardzinba (Abkhaz: Владислав Арӡынба, Georgian: ვლადისლავ არძინბა; 14 May 1945 – 4 March 2010) was an Abkhaz historian and politician who served as the first de facto president of Abkhazia. Ardzinba led Abkhazia to de facto independence in the 1992–1993 War with Georgia, but its de jure independence from Georgia remained internationally unrecognised during Ardzinba's two terms as President from 1994 to 2005. His government orchestrated ethnic cleansing of Georgian civilians in Abkhazia in 1993.

A noted specialist in Hittitology, he was a member of the first parliament to be elected democratically in the Soviet Union in 1989.

== Early life and career ==
Vladislav Ardzinba was born in the village of Lower Eshera, Sukhumi District, Abkhaz ASSR, Georgian SSR, Soviet Union, to a Muslim Abkhaz family. After graduating from the Historical Department of the Sukhumi Pedagogical Institute, Ardzinba studied at the Tbilisi State University, where he received a doctoral degree. He then worked for eighteen years in Moscow specialising in ancient Middle Eastern civilizations under Yevgeniy Primakov, then head of the Institute of Oriental Studies in Moscow, and later Russian foreign and Prime Minister. He then returned to Sukhumi and he served there as the director of the Abkhazian Institute of Language, Literature and History from 1987 until 1989, when he was elected a Deputy to the Supreme Soviet of the Soviet Union from Gudauta. From there, he was involved closely with national issues, including Abkhazia, and quickly emerged as one of the most active proponents of the Abkhaz secessionist cause. While a deputy to the USSR Supreme Soviet, Ardzinba forged close ties with the hardliners in Moscow, particularly with the parliamentary chairman Anatoly Lukyanov and other members of the hardline communist groups in Moscow that were responsible for the August 1991 coup attempt.

== Role in the Georgian-Abkhaz conflict ==
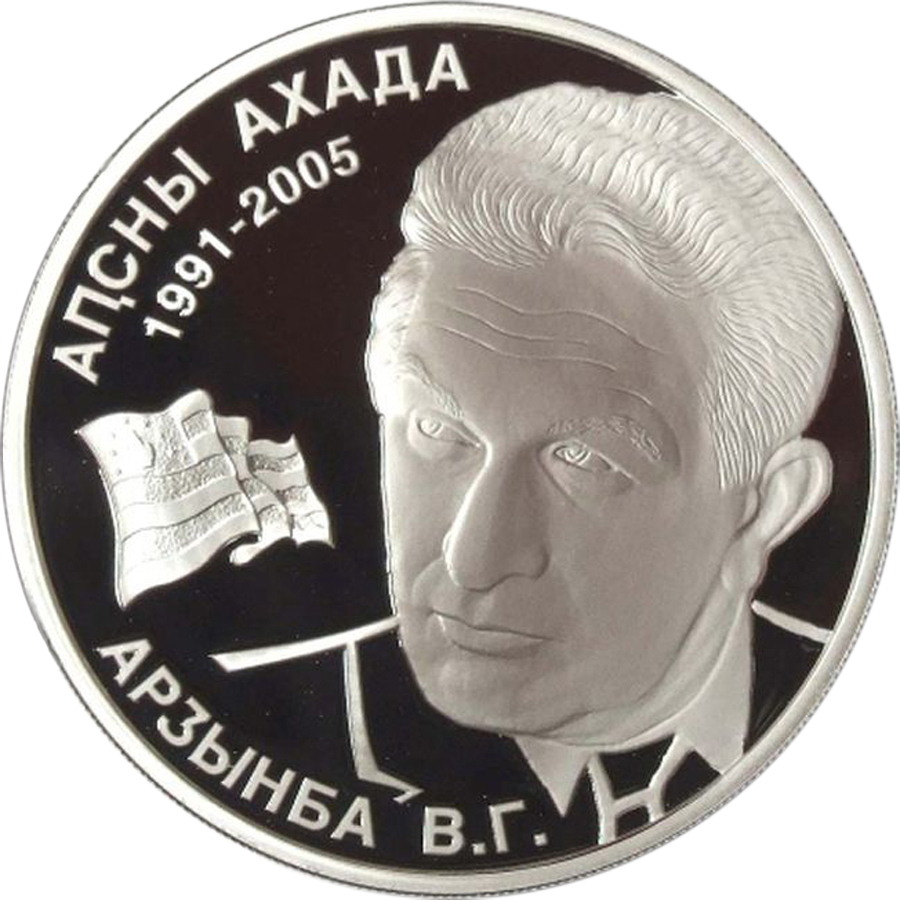
Reverse side of a 10 apsar commemorative coin minted in 2008 celebrating Vladislav Ardzinba

He was a member of the first parliament to be elected democratically in the Soviet Union in 1989.

On 4 December 1990, Ardzinba was elected Chairman of the Supreme Soviet of Abkhazia. Ardzinba, who was a charismatic but excitable figure popular among the Abkhaz, was believed by Georgians to have helped to instigate the violence of July 1989. Ardzinba managed to consolidate his power relatively quickly and reneged on pre-election promises to increase the representation of Georgians in Abkhazia's autonomous structures; since then, Ardzinba tried to rule Abkhazia relatively single-handedly, but avoided, for the time being, overt conflict with the central authorities in Tbilisi. In mid-1991, he negotiated and accepted the Georgian concession on the reform of the electoral law that granted the Abkhaz wide over-representation in the Supreme Soviet. However, Ardzinba created the Abkhazian National Guard that was mono-ethnically Abkhaz, and initiated a practice of replacing ethnic Georgians in leading positions with Abkhaz. As the Georgian-Abkhaz tensions rose, Ardzinba's rhetoric mounted, as he claimed in late July 1992 that "Abkhazia is strong enough to fight Georgia."

In August 1992, a Georgian military force ousted Ardzinba and his group from Sukhumi when Abkhazian militants seized government buildings. They took shelter in Gudauta, a home to the Soviet-era Russian military base. Ardzinba benefited from his contacts with the Russian hardliner circles and military leaders to garner critical support in the war against the Georgian government.

== Presidency ==
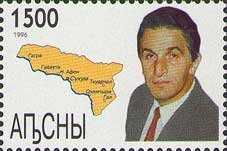
Ardzinba on a 1997 stamp of Abkhazia

After the hostilities ended in 1994 and the bulk of the Georgian population was forced out of Abkhazia, the Abkhazian parliament elected Ardzinba to the presidency, a move that was condemned by Georgia and the United Nations as illegal. He won the first direct polls on 3 October 1999, without an opponent and was re-elected as president of Abkhazia. He installed an autocratic regime and remained politically untouchable until his health seriously deteriorated in 2003. He once stated that independence from Georgia is not negotiable, and he tried to align the state with Russia, whose political and economic support was essential to the republic. As a leader of the Abkhaz side he met the two successive Russian presidents, Boris Yeltsin and Vladimir Putin, as well as a President of Georgia, Eduard Shevardnadze.

"If they [Georgians] don't want to be part of our country, we will simply drive them out. Its their choice will it be willingly or by force ..."

— Speech by Vladislav Ardzinba

Under his rule, human rights records were extremely poor as most of the pre-war Georgian population of Abkhazia were deprived of the right to return, and those who remained were subjected to systematic ethnic cleansing. Ardzinba aroused some further criticism from the international community after issuing a decree banning Jehovah's Witnesses in 1995.

During the last years of his presidency Ardzinba faced criticism for both failing to bring stability to Abkhazia and his increasingly low public profile. He had not appeared in public since 2002. As a result, the role of governing the state had been increasingly left to Prime Minister Raul Khajimba.

He had been in extremely poor health and underwent treatment in Moscow for some time. Despite increasing calls from the opposition (particularly the Amtsakhara movement) for him to resign he had stated that he would finish his term, which was supposed to end in October 2004, but in fact did not end until 12 February 2005, due to disputes over the election of his successor. There were also calls for him to be impeached. However, although the Abkhaz Constitution allows for impeachment, the process would likely not have been completed before the end of his term, so no serious steps were taken to bring it about. He was unable to run for a third term due to constitutional restrictions, and it is unlikely that his health would have enabled him to do so even if this was allowed.

He was replaced by Sergei Bagapsh, the winner of the presidential election of 12 January 2005 held one month after the contested 2004 election.

== Death ==
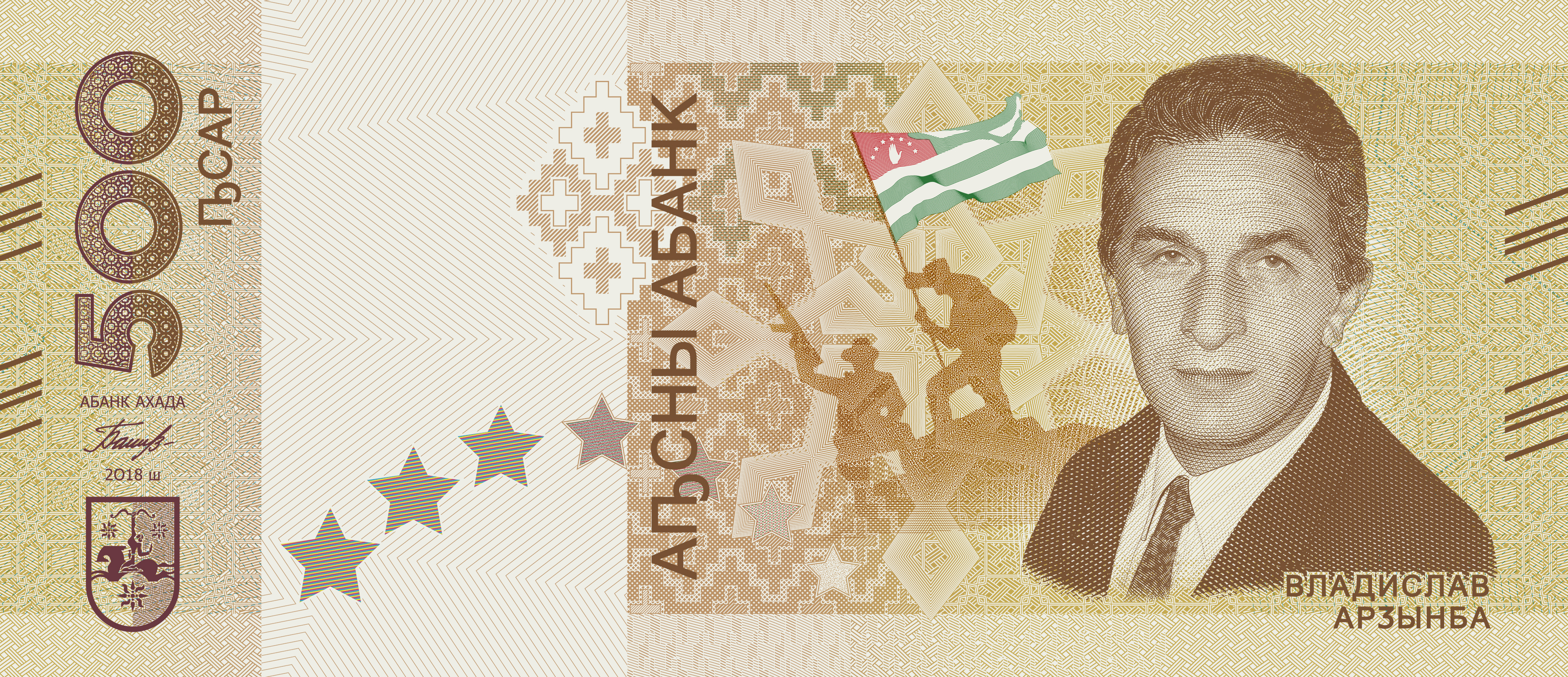
Ardzinba on a 500 apsar commemorative banknote issued in 2018 celebrating 25 years of the victory on the 1992-93 war against Georgia

By 2010, Ardzinba's health was in decline and had been for some time. Ardzinba died on 4 March 2010, at the age of 64. He was in the Central Clinical Hospital in Moscow at the time. He had been escorted there the previous week. The cause of death was not released to the public. He is survived by his wife and daughter. The President of Abkhazia, Sergei Bagapsh, paid tribute: "His service to the Abkhaz people was boundless". Three days of mourning were declared in Abkhazia in remembrance of Ardzinba.

Political offices
Preceded by none	President of Abkhazia; 1994–2005	Succeeded by Sergei Bagapsh
