= People's Assembly of Abkhazia =

Unicameral legislature of Abkhazia

People's Assembly – Parliament Аԥсны Жәлар Реизара – Апарламент Apsny Žwlar Reizara – Aparlament
- 7th People's Assembly

Type
- Type: Unicameral

History
- Founded: 26 November 1994

Leadership
- Speaker: Lasha Ashuba since 12 April 2022
- Vice Speakers: List: Astamur Arshba, (Independent) since 12 April 2022; Fazlibey Avidzba, (Independent) since 12 April 2022; Ashot Minosyan, (Independent) since 12 April 2022

Structure
- Seats: 35
- Political groups: Independents (29); Amtsakhara (5); Aitaira (1)

Elections
- First election: 23 November 1996
- Last election: 12 and 26 March 2022
- Next election: April 2027

Meeting place
- Sukhumi Zvanba Street 1

Website
- parlamentra.org/ab/

The People's Assembly – Parliament of the Republic of Abkhazia (Abkhaz: Аԥсны Жәлар Реизара – Апарламент, romanized: Apsny Žwlar Reizara – Aparlament, Georgian: აფხაზეთის ე.წ რესპუბლიკის სახალხო კრება, romanized: apkhazetis e.ts' resp'ublik'is sakhalkho k'reba, Russian: Народное Собрание – Парламент Республики Абхазия, romanized: Narodnoye Sobraniye – Parlament Respubliki Abkhaziya) is the unicameral legislature of the Republic of Abkhazia.

== Composition ==
The People's Assembly has 35 members, elected for five-year terms in single-seat constituencies. On 30 July 2015, Parliament failed to support a constitutional amendment increasing the number of members to 45 and introducing a mixed electoral system. The proposal was supported by 19 Deputies, four short of the required two-thirds majority. (Five deputies voted against, 4 abstained.)

Members of the Peoples Assembly are required to speak both Abkhaz and Russian languages, this will be tested by a language commission of the Central Election Commission of Abkhazia. MPs must also take oath of allegiance to the constitution and people of Abkhazia, this must be completed in the Abkhaz language.

=== Leadership ===
On 12 April 2022, at the first meeting of the elected parliament, Lasha Ashuba was unanimously elected speaker who succeeded Valery Kvarchia. Fazlybey Avidzba [ru], Astamur Arshba and Ashot Minosyan were elected vice-speakers of the parliament. The meeting was held in the hall of the Cabinet of Ministers.

=== Committees ===
The People's Assembly during the 7th convocation currently contains the following nine committees:

1. State and Legal Policy
2. Budget, Credit institutions, Taxes and Finance
3. Economic Policy and Reforms
4. Defense and National Security
5. Social Policy, Labour, Health, Demography, and Affairs of Veterans and War Invalids
6. Education, Science, Language Policy, Religion and Media Affairs
7. Culture, Youth Affairs and Sports
8. International, Inter-Parliamentary and Compatriots Relations
9. Agrarian Policy, Natural Resources and Ecology

The number of committees had been eleven during the 4th convocation (from 2007 until 2012).

=== List of current Members of the 7th Convocation (2022-2027) ===
| # | Constituency | Name | Party Affiliation | Position | Notes |
|---|---|---|---|---|---|
| 1 | Sukhum (New District) | Inar Gitsba | Independent | | |
| 2 | Sukhum (New District) | Dmitriy Halbad | Independent | | |
| 3 | Sukhum (Old Settlement) | Narsou Salakaya | Independent | | |
| 4 | Sukhum (North) | Batal Aiba | Independent | | |
| 5 | Sukhum (Sinop District) | Lasha Ashuba | Independent | Speaker | |
| 6 | Sukhum (Central) | Dmitri Marshan | Independent | | |
| 7 | Sukhum (Library) | Rashida Aiba | Independent | | |
| 8 | Sukhum (Mayak District) | Naur Narmania | Independent | | |
| 9 | Sukhum (East) | Kan Kvarchia | Independent | | |
| 10 | Pitsunda | Daut Khutaba | Independent | | |
| 11 | Byzb | Timur Beiia | Independent | | |
| 12 | Gagra | Astamur Arshba | Independent | | |
| 13 | Gagra Town | Alhas Bartsits | Independent | | |
| 14 | Tsandrypsh | Galust Trapizonyan | Amtsakhara | | |
| 15 | Otkhara | Badrik Pilia | Independent | | |
| 16 | Duripsh | Beslan Khalvash | Independent | | |
| 17 | Lykhny | Aslan Lakoba | Independent | | |
| 18 | Gudauta One | Leonid Lakerbaia | Aitaira | | |
| 19 | Gudauta Two | Alkhas Khagba | Independent | | |
| 20 | Aatsin | Alisa Gularia | Amtsakhara | | |
| 21 | New Athos | Natali Smyr | Independent | | |
| 22 | Eshera | Almaskhan Ardzinba | Independent | | |
| 23 | Gumista | Levon Galustian | Independent | | |
| 24 | Pshap | Ashot Minosyan | Independent | Vice Speaker | |
| 25 | Machara | Inar Sadzba | Independent | | |
| 26 | Dranda | Adgur Kharazia | Independent | | |
| 27 | Beslakhuba | Venori Bebia | Independent | | |
| 28 | Gup | Demur Gogia | Independent | | |
| 29 | Chlou | Almas Akaba | Amtsakhara | | |
| 30 | Kutol | Vakhtang Golandzia | Independent | | |
| 31 | Kyndygh | Rezo Zantaria | Independent | | |
| 32 | Ochamchira | Batal Jopua | Independent | | |
| 33 | Tkuarchal One | Beslan Emurkhba | Amtsakhara | | |
| 34 | Tkuarchal Two | German Kacharava | Independent | | |
| 35 | Gal | Temur Shegrelia | Independent | | |

== Notable people ==
- Beslan Bartsits, member of the 5th and 6th convocations of the People's Assembly, former Head of Gagra District and former Prime Minister of Abkhazia.
- Aslan Bzhania, member of the 6th convocation of the People's Assembly and Fifth President of Abkhazia.
- Valeri Gurjua, member of the First Convocation of the People's Assembly (1992–1996).
- Raul Khajimba, member of the 5th Convocation of the Peoples Assembly and Fourth President of Abkhazia
- Kan Kvarchia, member of the 5th and 7th Convocations of the Peoples Assembly, former Acting Sukhum Mayor
- Sergei Shamba, member of the First and 5th Convocations of the People's Assembly, Chairman of United Abkhazia, Former Prime Minister of Abkhazia, Former Minister of Foreign Affairs of Abkhazia and former chair of Aidgylara.

== See also ==
- 2024 Parliament of Abkhazia shooting
- 3rd convocation of the People's Assembly of Abkhazia
- 4th convocation of the People's Assembly of Abkhazia
- 5th convocation of the People's Assembly of Abkhazia
