= Beslan (disambiguation) =

Beslan is a town in the Republic of North Ossetia–Alania, Russia.

Beslan may also refer to:

== 2004 school attack ==
- Beslan: The Tragedy of School No. 1, a book
- Beslan school siege, 2004 hostage crisis
- Timeline of the Beslan school siege
- Mothers of Beslan
- Voice of Beslan
- Beslan charity efforts
- International response to the Beslan school siege

== People ==
- Beslan Adzhindzhal (b. 1974), Russian football player
- Beslan Ardzinba, mayor of Pitsunda, Abkhazia
- Beslan Arshba, governor of Gali District, Abkhazia
- Beslan Butba, a businessman and politician from Abkhazia
- Beslan Dbar, candidate in the 2007 Abkhazian parliamentary election
- Beslan Eshba, deputy of the 5th convocation of the People's Assembly of Abkhazia
- Beslan Gantamirov, Chechen politician, one of the leaders on the Russian side of the Battle of Grozny (1999–2000)
- Beslan Gubliya (b. 1976), Russian football player
- Beslan Karchava, participant in the 2011 Abkhazian local elections
- Beslan Kubrava, Head of the Presidential Administration in the Government of President Ankvab, Abkhazia
- Beslan Kvitsinia, member of the 5th convocation of the Sukhumi City Council, Abkhazia
- Beslan Mudranov, competitor in the 2010 World Judo Championships – Men's 60 kg
- Beslan Sergei-ipa Kubrava, Vice Premier in the Government of President Bagapsh, Abkhazia
- Beslan Shinkuba, member of the 5th convocation of the Sukhumi City Council, Abkhazia
- Beslan Tsvinaria, member of the People's Assembly of Abkhazia

== Other ==
- FC FAYUR Beslan, soccer team from the Republic of North Ossetia–Alania, Russia
- Beslan Airport, an airport in the Republic of North Ossetia–Alania, Russia
- 6374 Beslan, a main-belt asteroid
