= 7th People's Assembly of Abkhazia =

Legislative term in breakaway state of Abkhazia

People's Assembly — Parliament of the Republic of Abkhazia of the 7th convocation
←	6th convocation	8th convocation	→
- Parties in People's Assembly

Overview
- Legislative body: People's Assembly of Abkhazia
- Jurisdiction: Abkhazia
- Meeting place: Zvanba 1, Sukhumi
- Term: 12 April 2022 –
- Government: Overwhelming majority of deputies
- Website: parlamentra.org
- Members: 35
- Speaker: Lasha Ashuba
- Vice Speakers: Naur Narmania, Fazlibey Avidzba, Ashot Minosyan

Sessions
- 1st: 12 April 2022 – 27 July 2022
- 2nd: October 2022 –

People's Assembly — Parliament of the Republic of Abkhazia of the 7th convocation (Russian: Народное Собрание — Парламент Республики Абхазия; Abkhaz: Аҧсны Жәлар Реизара – Апарламент) is the current convocation of the People's Assembly of partially recognized Republic of Abkhazia, elected in the 2022 Abkhazian parliamentary election.

== History ==
On 12 April 2022, at the first meeting of the elected parliament, Lasha Ashuba was unanimously elected speaker. Fazlybey Avidzba, Astamur Arshba and Ashot Minosyan were elected vice-speakers of the parliament. The meeting was held in the hall of the Cabinet of Ministers. The first meeting in accordance with the Constitution is chaired by the oldest deputy Fazlibey Avidzba, born 1957. Member of the Russian State Duma Konstantin Zatulin is also present at the first meeting as a guest.

== Composition ==
This list contains all 35 elected MPs. 33 of them were elected in the first two rounds, and two constituencies had to hold by-elections.

Constituency	Deputy	Party	Birth year	Notes
1st (New District)	Inar Gitsba	Independent	1985	
2nd (New District)	Astamur Gerhelia	Amtsakhara	1986	
3rd (Stariy Poselok)	Narsou Salakaya	Independent	1983	
4th (Severny)	Erik Rshtuni	Independent	1986	
5th (Sinopsky)	Lasha Ashuba	Independent	1989	Elected Speaker at the first meeting
6th (Centralny)	Dmitriy Marshania	Independent	1989	
7th (Biblioteka)	Rashida Aiba	Independent	1975	
8th (Mayaksky)	Naur Narmania	Independent	1991	Elected in the 11 June by-election
9th (Vostochny)	Kan Kvarchiya	Independent	1974	
10th (Pitsundsky)	Daut Khutaba	Independent	1982	
11th (Bzypsky)	Timur Beiia	Independent	1982	
12th (Gagrsky)	Astamur Arshba	Independent	1988	Elected Vice Speaker at the first meeting
13th (Gagrsky Gorodskoy)	Alhas Bartsits	Independent	1983	
14th (Tsandrypshsky)	Galust Trapizonyan	Amtsakhara	1958	
15th (Otkharsky)	Badrik Pilia	Independent	1979	
16th (Duripshsky)	Beslan Khalvash	Independent	1970	
17th (Lykhnynsky)	Aslan Lakoba	Independent	1979	
18th (Gudautsky Gorodskoy 1)	Leonid Lakerbaia	Aitaira	1947	Elected in the 14 May by-election
19th (Gudautsky Gorodskoy 2)	Alkhas Khagba	Independent	1983	
20th (Aatsynskiy)	Alisa Gularia	Amtsakhara	1977	
21st (Novoafonsky)	Akhra Pachulia	Independent	1977	
22nd (Eshersky)	Fazlibey Avidzba	Independent	1957	Elected Vice Speaker at the first meeting
23rd (Gumistinsky)	Levon Galustian	Independent	1980	
24th (Pshapsky)	Ashot Minosyan	Independent	1974	Elected Vice Speaker at the first meeting
25th (Macharsky)	Inar Sadzba	Independent	1993	
26th (Drandsky)	Adgur Kharazia	Independent	1959	
27th (Baslakhusky)	Venori Bebia	Independent	1976	
28th (Gupsky)	Demur Gogia	Independent	1977	
29th (Chlousky)	Almas Akaba	Amtsakhara	1992	
30th (Kutolsky)	Vakhtangi Golandzia	Independent	1969	
31st (Kyndygsky)	Rezo Zantaria	Independent	1965	
32nd (Ochamchyrsky)	Batal Jopua	Independent	1985	
33rd (Tkuarchalskiy 1)	Beslan Emurkhba	Amtsakhara	1987	
34th (Tkuarchalskiy 2)	German Kacharava	Independent	1992	
35th (Galsky)	Temur Shergelia	Independent	1975	

== By-elections ==
A number of MPs of the 7th Convocation that were elected after the initial runoff by-elections, have either resigned to taken up new posts, such as the two MPs involved in the 2024 Abkhazian Parliament Shooting, with Vakhtang Golandzia losing his life and Adgur Kharazia being arrested in June 2025 after multiple months on the run. These by-elections are held separately by the Central Election Commission of Abkhazia.

Constituency	Name of new MP	Date of By- election	Party	Birth Year	Previous MP	Reason for by election
26th (Drandsky)	Jopua Astamur	26 July 2025	Independent	1991	Adgur Kharazia	Adgur Kharazia was the perpetrator of the 2024 Abkhazian Parliament Shooting and was arrested in June 2025 after being on the run.
30th (Kutolsky)	Gennady Tsulaya	18 April 2026	Independent	1989	Vakhtang Golandzia	Due to the death of the previous MP Vakhtang Golandzia
34th (Tkuarchalskiy 2)	Eshsou Dochia	18 April 2026	Independent	1998	German Kacharava	Appointed Acting head of Tkuarchal district

== Assembly Committees ==
In the seventh convocation of the Peoples Assembly of Abkhazia currently contains nine committees, MPs can be members of multiple committees such as Kan Kvarchia who is on the State Committee for State and Legal Policy as well as the State Committee on Budget, Credit Institutions, Taxes and Finance.

1. State and Legal Policy (Chairman: Daut Khutaba)
2. Budget, Credit Institutions, Taxes and Finance (Chairman: Beslan Khalvash)
3. Economic Policy and Reforms (Chairman: Rezo Zantaria)
4. Defense and National Security (Chairman: Temur Shergelia)
5. Social Policy, Labour, Health, Demography, and Affairs of Veterans and War Invalids (Chairman: Rashida Aiba)
6. Education, Science, Language Policy, Religion and Media Affairs (Chairman: Inar Sadzba)
7. Culture, Youth Affairs and Sports (Chairman: Venori Bebia)
8. International, Inter-Parliamentary and Compatriots Relations (Chairman: Alhas Bartsits)
9. Agrarian Policy, Natural Resources and Ecology (Chairman: Timur Beiia)
