= 5th convocation of the Sukhumi City Council =

The 5th convocation of the Sukhumi City Council has been in office since 10 March 2011.

== Formation ==
=== 2011 City Council election ===
The 2011 City Council election was contested by 85 candidates in 26 single-seat constituencies. Among the candidates were the incumbent Mayor of Sukhumi Alias Labakhua, as well as 14 sitting members of the City Council. Of these, 5 were re-elected (including Labakhua). None of the 12 female candidates was elected. United Abkhazia had nominated candidates in all 26 constituencies, 16 of which won. The Communist Party and the Sukhumi Military School had nominated 2 and 1 candidates, respectively, all of which lost. The remaining candidates had been nominated by 64 initiative groups, 10 of these independent candidates won a seat (including Daut Nanba after the re-run in constituency #1).

=== Rerun in constituency no. 1 ===
On 16 February, the Sukhumi election commission ordered a rerun in constituency no. 1, because there had been a soldier who had voted at 2 constituencies, and another voter from another constituency. Preliminary results had indicated a victory for independent candidate Daut Nanba. Repeated elections were scheduled for 16 April. Candidates had to be nominated between 7 and 27 March and registered between 28 March and 7 April. Only Daut Nanba, Guram Berulava and Aslan Sangulia participated the second time around, Nanba again won.

== By-elections ==
=== Constituency no. 16 ===
Due to the election to Parliament of Guram Barganjia on 10 March 2012, a by-election was held in constituency no. 16 on 24 June. Candidates were to be nominated from 16 May until 4 June and registered from 4 until 14 June. On 13 June, the Election Commission registered three candidates: the businessman Jemalik Aiba, the housewife Nina Kiropova and Enrik Leiba, who had lost to Barganjia in the 2011 election. Leiba won the election with 207 votes, against 104 for Aiba and 17 for Kiropova. A total of 331 people turned out to vote, out of 860 registered voters.

=== Constituency no. 15 ===
Due to the resignation of Astamur Adleiba, a by-election was held in constituency no. 15 on 16 February 2013. Candidates were to be nominated between 8 and 28 January. (Note: "В округе №15 г. Сухум состоятся выборы депутата городского собрания". Apsnypress. 20 December 2012.) The election was won by English teacher at School no. 7 Murtaz Shamatava, who received 262 votes, defeating Ruzana Shlarba (in second place with 200 votes), Valeri Bganba and Valina Azhiba, out of a total of 571 votes cast and 1549 registered voters. (Note: "Муртаз Шаматава избран депутатом Сухумского городского собрания". Apsnypress. 19 February 2013.)

=== Constituencies no. 2, 3, 6, 12 and 19 ===
On 20 January 2015, the resignation of five deputies was announced: Lasha Kiut, Aslan Ajapua, Erik Rshtuni, Aleksei Lomia and Khrips Jopua, Deputies for constituencies 2, 3, 6, 12 and 19 respectively. Lomia had been appointed as Prosecutor General of Abkhazia, Jopua as Chairman of the State Committee for Repatriation and Rshtuni as Deputy Chairman of the Committee for Standards and Consumer and Technical Supervision. On 5 February, the Election Commission composed by the City Council elected Rismag Ajinjal as its chairman, and set 4 April as the election date.

Adgur Kharazia had been appointed as acting mayor by newly elected President Raul Khajimba on 22 October 2014, and had to be elected to the City Council to be permanently appointed. (Kharazia's predecessor Alias Labakhua, although dismissed as mayor, remained a member of the City Council.) Kharazia was elected unopposed in constituency no. 3, obtaining 296 votes, or 98% of all votes cast, from 908 registered voters. In constituency no. 2, Aleksei Archelia defeated Georgi Skakaia by 163 votes to 126, from 617 registered voters. The election in constituency no. 6 (1501 registered voters) was narrowly won by Nestor Bigvava (227 votes) over Lana Tsaava (222) and Aslan Jinjolia (216), the election in constituency no. 12 (1905 registered voters) by Omar Avidzba (253 votes) over Denis Abelov (187) and Adgur Agrba (13) and the election in constituency no. 19 (1191 registered voters) by Apsert Kanjaria (246 votes) over Gudisa Pilia (207) and Mustafa Eshba (42).

== Composition ==
=== Leadership ===
On 21 February, the new city assembly held its first session, in which it had to elect a successor for its outgoing Chairman Adgur Amichba, who had not run again in the assembly election. However, the two candidates Amiran Kakalia and Konstantin Pilia tied with 12 votes, with 1 invalid vote. The session was then adjourned until 23 February. In the second vote Amiran Kakalia beat Konstantin Pilia by 15-to-9 (with 1 invalid vote). Beslan Shinkuba was subsequently elected Deputy Chairman and Astamur Adleiba Secretary.

On 1 March 2012, Amiran Kakalia resigned as speaker. Three deputies were put forward to succeed Kakalia, 22 deputies participated in the vote. Konstantin Pilia won with 12 votes against 7 for Kondrat Samsonia and 2 for Enver Chamagua and 1 abstention.

=== List of members ===
#	Name	Position	Notes
1	Daut Nanba		
2	Lasha Kiut		Resigned
2	Aleksei Archelia		Elected through a by-election on 4 April 2015
3	Aslan Ajapua		Resigned
3	Adgur Kharazia		Elected through a by-election on 4 April 2015
4	Apollon Lataria		
5	Adamur Lagvilava		
6	Erik Rshtuni		Appointed as Deputy Chairman of the State Committee for Standards and Consumer and Technical Supervision
6	Nestor Bigvava		Elected through a by-election on 4 April 2015
7	Kondrat Samsonia		
8	Enver Chamagua		
9	Mizan Zantaria		
10	Konstantin Pilia	Chairman (since 1 March 2012)	
11	Amiran Kakalia	Chairman (until 1 March 2012)	
12	Aleksei Lomia		Elected Prosecutor General on 7 October 2014
12	Omar Avidzba		Elected through a by-election on 4 April 2015
13	Beslan Karchava		
14	Teimuraz Anua		
15	Astamur Adleiba		Resigned
15	Murtaz Shamatava		Elected through a by-election on 16 February 2013
16	Guram Barganjia		Elected to Parliament on 10 March 2012
16	Enrik Leiba		Elected through a by-election on 24 June 2012
17	Beslan Kvitsinia		
18	Beslan Shinkuba		
19	Khrips Jopua		Appointed as Chairman of the State Committee for Repatriation on 14 June 2013
19	Apsert Kanjaria		Elected through a by-election on 4 April 2015
20	Arnold Minaia		
21	Alias Labakhua		
22	Dmitri Shlarba		
23	Mizan Zukhba		
24	Vitali Chitanava		
25	Roman Tskua		
26	Ronald Gamgia		
