= 5th convocation of the People's Assembly of Abkhazia =

Legislative term in Abkhazia

The 5th convocation of the People's Assembly of Abkhazia took office following the 2012 elections on 3 April 2012 and was replaced by the 6th convocation following the 2017 elections.

== Formation ==
=== Rerun in constituency no. 1 ===
The first round of the election in constituency no. 1 was declared invalid because the turnout had failed to surpass the threshold of 25%. On 19 March the Central Election Commission announced that the rerun would be held on 6 May. The rerun was won with 1932 out of 3413 votes (56.61%) by businessman Beslan Eshba, who had not participated in the original election. On 10 May, Eshba was registered as deputy by the Central Election Commission.

=== Rerun in constituency no. 21 ===
On 29 March, the Supreme Court of Abkhazia invalidated the election in constituency no. 21 and ordered a rerun. The original count had given Aida Ashuba a slim first round majority of 401 votes out of 795 (50.44%), but after a complaint by the campaign team of runner up Valeri Kvarchia, the election commission of precinct 1 held a recount. In the recount, 46 more ballots were found to be invalid, causing Ashuba's vote share to fall below 50% and making a second round run-off between Ashuba and Kvarchia necessary. Ashuba then issued a complaint with the Central Election Commission as his observers had not been present during the recount. The Central Election Commission agreed with the complaint and requested the precinct and constituency election commissions to uphold the original count. When the local election commission refused to comply, the Central Election Commission brought the matter to the Supreme Court.

Neither Ashuba nor Kvarchia managed to gain enough votes to win an outright majority in the first round of the repeat election on 20 May. In the run-off on 4 June, Kvarchia defeated Ashuba with 679 votes against 623.

== By-elections ==
=== Constituency no. 26 (first time) ===
On 25 May 2012, only two months after the election, Temur Logua, Deputy for constituency no. 26 in Chlou, was found dead in his apartment in Moscow. The by-election was set for 22 July, with the nomination period running from 2 to 22 June and the registration period from 22 June to 12 July.

On 4 June, an initiative group nominated Beslan Tarba. On 7 June, the Forum for the National Unity of Abkhazia held an extraordinary congress and unanimously nominated Appollon Shinkuba. On 12 June, Chairman of the Party for the Economic Development of Abkhazia Beslan Butba was nominated by an initiative group. All three were successfully registered.

In the first round, on 22 July, no candidate received an absolute majority. Out of 2804 registered voters, 2040 turned out to vote. Of the votes cast, 32 were deemed invalid, Beslan Butba received 920 votes, Beslan Tarba 647 and Appolon Tarba 441. The second round, held on 5 August, was won by Butba with 1125 votes over 1026 for Tarba and 42 invalid votes. 2193 out of a total 2841 registered voters participated in the second round.

=== Constituency no. 1 (first time) ===
On 30 April 2013, President Ankvab appointed Member of Parliament Beslan Eshba as Vice-Premier. The first round of the by-election for his successor was held on 29 June. A run-off between opposition leader Daur Arshba and former Vice Speaker Irina Agrba was held on 13 July, and won by Arshba.

Candidates were to be nominated from 10 until 30 May. On 14 May, Daur Arshba, who had been a member of the 4th convocation but had failed re-election in Constituency no. 25, was nominated by an initiative group. On 16 May, Roland Gamgia was nominated by an initiative group. During the 2012 election, Gamgia had won a plurality in the first round, which was invalidated due to a large turn-out, and ended second to newcomer Eshba in the rerun. On 21 May, former Interior Minister Leonid Dzapshba was nominated by an initiative group. On 22 May, Apsnypress reported that Roman Tskua, Lyuba Ashuba, Nadir Bitiev and Irina Agrba had also been nominated by initiative groups, the latter two of which had failed to be elected in Constituency no. 6 in 2012, with Agrba having been Vice Speaker of the 4th convocation. On 27 June, two days before the election, Bitiev withdrew his candidacy.

No candidate received a first-round victory. Arshba finished in first place, with 1043 out of 3228 votes cast, and Agrba in second place, with 650 votes. Dzapshba received 601 votes, Tskua 509, Gamgia 319 and Ashuba 22. 84 votes were ruled invalid by the Election Commission.

In the second round, 3372 votes were cast, 1974 for Arshba and 1325 for Agrba (and 73 invalid). The Central Election Committee officially registered Arshba as a Member of Parliament on 19 July.

=== Constituency no. 26 (second time) ===
On 13 June 2014, following the 2014 Abkhazian political crisis, Beslan Butba was appointed as acting Vice Premier. Accordingly, his membership of Parliament was terminated on 18 June.

On 12 July, an initiative group nominated Almas Japua, and on 14 July another initiative group Amiran Kakalia. Both candidates were formally registered by the Central Election Commission on 1 August.

The election, held on 31 August, was won by Japua with 889 votes to 848, out of 1761 votes cast. On 1 September, Japua was registered as a member of Parliament.

=== Constituency no. 30 ===
Following his inauguration as President of Abkhazia, Raul Khajimba's Membership of Parliament was formally terminated on 7 October 2014.

On 22 October, the Central Election Commission registered the candidacy of Georgi Kharchilava, followed on 23 October by Taifun Ardzinba, and on 29 October by Marat Kvitsinia and Beslan Emurkhba, all through initiative groups.

The by-election was held on 7 December. Out of 4464 registered voters, 1726 participated, of which 769 voted for Ardzinba, 564 for Emurkhba, 215 for Kharchilava, 136 for Kvitsinia and 44 votes were deemed invalid, necessitating a run-off between Ardzinba and Emurkhba.

On 15 December, the Coordinating Council of Political Parties and Public Organisations resolved to support Ardzinba's candidacy.

The run-off was won by Ardzinba.

=== Constituency no. 24 ===
On 22 October, newly elected President Raul Khajimba appointed Adgur Kharazia as Acting Mayor of Sukhumi. Accordingly, the People's Assembly resolved to terminate his mandate as MP from that day onwards, and on 31 October, the Central Election Commission set a by-election for 21 December.

On 3 November, the Central Election Commission registered the candidacy of former Prime Minister Sergei Shamba, followed on 12 November by Tengiz Agrba and on 14 November by Beslan Kamkia, all through initiative groups.

On 22 December, the CEC announced that no candidate had obtained an absolute majority, and that run-off would be held between Shamba and Agrba on 28 December. The run-off was narrowly won by Shamba, who received 1109 votes to Agrba's 1091.

=== Constituency no. 11 ===
On 22 October, newly elected President Raul Khajimba appointed Beslan Bartsits as Acting Governor of Gagra District. Accordingly, the People's Assembly resolved to terminate his mandate as MP from that day onwards, and on 31 October, the Central Election Commission set a by-election for 21 December.

On 11 November, the Central Election Commission registered the candidacy of Grigori Enik (who had been dismissed as governor by Khajimba in favour of Bartsits), followed on 12 November by Samson Demerjiba and Temur Gulia and on 17 November by former MP Galust Trapizonyan (who had lost the run-off in constituency no. 20 in the 2012 Parliamentary election), all through initiative groups.

On 21 November, Aruaa resolved to support Gulia's candidacy, followed on 1 December by Young Abkhazia, on 3 December by United Abkhazia, on 10 December by the Russian Citizens Union and on 15 December by the Coordinating Council of Political Parties and Public Organisations.

On 8 December, the CEC accepted Trapizonyan's withdrawal from the election race.

On 22 December, the CEC announced that the election had been won by Gulia.

=== Constituency no. 6 ===
On 20 March 2015, Artur Mikvabia was appointed prime minister by President Khajimba. On 1 April, his membership in Parliament was terminated. A by-election was scheduled for 24 May.

On 6 April, the Central Election Commission registered the candidacy of Tengiz Agrba (who had narrowly lost the December 2014 by-election in Constituency no. 24), followed on 9 April by former Sukhumi City Council Chairman Givi Gabnia.

The election was won by Agrba, who gained 961 votes, to Gabnia's 431 and 58 invalid votes.

=== Constituency no. 2 ===
On 16 August 2016, Aslan Kobakhia was appointed Vice Premier and Interior Minister in the cabinet of newly appointed Prime Minister Beslan Bartsits. On 10 October, Parliament in its autumn session terminated Kobakhia's membership.

There was only one candidate to succeed Kobakhia, history teacher Eduard Khashba, who was nominated by an initiative group on 7 November and registered by the Central Election Commission on 18 November.

The election on 10 December was declared invalid due to low turnout, with only 298 votes cast.

=== Constituency no. 1 (second time) ===
On 10 October, Daur Arshba was appointed Head of the Presidential Administration. That same day Parliament in its autumn session terminated Arshba's membership.

There was only one candidate to succeed Kobakhia, Akhra Avidzba, businessman and leader of the Pyatnashka Brigade of the Donetsk People's Republic in the War in Donbas, who was nominated by an initiative group on 7 November and registered by the Central Election Commission on 18 November.

The election on 10 December was declared invalid due to low turnout, with only 337 votes cast where more than 1800 would have been necessary to pass the 25% hurdle.

== Speaker and Vice Speakers ==
The first session of the 5th convocation of the People's Assembly was held on 3 April 2012. It was opened by the oldest deputy, Artur Mikvabia and attended by President Alexander Ankvab, Vice President Mikhail Logua, Prime Minister Leonid Lakerbaia, Supreme Court Head Rauf Korua, Arbitration Court Head A. Gurjua, the deputies of the previous convocation, the members of the Cabinet and regional Administration Heads.

During the first session, Valeri Bganba was elected speaker, defeating Raul Khajimba by 21 votes to 11 (with one invalid vote). The number of Vice Speakers was expanded from three to four, so as to better entertain foreign relations. Adgur Kharazia, Otari Tsvizhba, Emma Gamisonia and Vagarshak Kosyan were elected Vice-Speaker.

Following the appointment of Kharazia as acting Mayor of Sukhumi on 22 October 2014, Daur Arshba was unanimously elected to succeed him as Vice Speaker on 12 November. Arshba's membership of Parliament was terminated on 10 October 2016 due to his appointment as Presidential Administration Head, and he was in turn succeeded by Valeri Kvarchia, who, as the sole candidate, was elected on 2 November by 26 or 27 of the 27 deputies in attendance.

== Committees ==
On 10 April, the deputies of the People's Assembly formed the following eight committees (three less than before):

1. Legal Policy, State Building and Human Rights
2. Budget, Credit Institutions, Tax and Finance
3. Economic Policy, Reform and Innovation
4. Defence and National Security
5. Social Policy, Labour and Health
6. Education, Science, Culture, Religion, Youth and Sport
7. International and Inter-Parliamentary Relations and Relations with Compatriots
8. Agrarian Policy, Natural Resources and Ecology

Except for the second and third committee, all committee chairmen were elected on 10 April. A three-membered counting commission was installed, chaired by Dmitri Gunba, who thence refused to stand in the chairmanship elections of the Committees for International and Inter-Parliamentary Relations and Relations with Compatriots and Agrarian Policy, Natural Resources and Ecology.

Deputy Fazilbei Avidzba nominated Raul Khajimba for the Chairmanship of the Committee for Defence and National Security, but he refused the candidacy, saying that he had indicated his unwillingness to become Chairman of any Committee during consultations with the Assembly's leadership. Avidzba was then himself nominated by Mikhail Sangulia, while Kan Kvarchia nominated Aslan Kobakhia. However, Kobakhia also refused the candidacy, saying that he did not want to engage in any backroom games and that Avidzba was highly qualified and deserved the chairmanship. Avidzba was elected with 28 votes against 2.

Artur Mikvabia failed to be elected as Chairman of the Committee for Economic Policy, Reform and Innovation. He stood unopposed, but while 15 deputies supported his candidacy, 15 deputies opposed it. On 11 April, the election was repeated, with Guram Barganjia as second candidate, who defeated Mikvabia with 19 votes to 11.

In the election for the chairmanship of the Committee for Budget, Credit Institutions, Tax and Finance, no candidate received a majority, with Beslan Tsvinaria receiving 14 and Georgi Agrba 15 votes and one abstention. Tsvinaria refused a proposal by Speaker Valeri Bganba to run for the chairmanship of the Committee for Economic Policy, Reform and Innovation instead, and so the election was repeated the following day. During the repeat election, Tsvinaria was again nominated by Raul Khajimba, who praised him as an experienced economist, but Tsvinaria withdrew his candidacy and requested that he become a member of the Committee for Social Policy, Labour and Health instead. Agrba was then elected chairman with 28 out of 30 votes.

On 7 October 2014, Kan Kvarchia was elected with 27 to 4 votes (out of 31 present) as chairman of the Committee for Agrarian Policy, Natural Resources and Ecology.

== Factions ==
On 7 August 2015, Georgi Agrba, Fazlibei Avidzba, Guram Barganjia, Anzor Kokoskeria and Akhra Pachulia established a faction, led by Agrba, called Apsadgyl and representing the eponymous socio-political organisation.

On 5 September Sergei Shamba, Taifun Ardzinba, Levon Galustyan, Beslan Gubaz, Temur Gulia, Mikhail Sangulia and Robert Yaylyan established a faction, led by Shamba.

== List of Members ==
#	Constituency	Name	Affiliation	Position	Notes
1	Sukhumi	Beslan Eshba			Since 10 May 2012, elected in rerun after original election was declared invalid due to low turnout. Appointed as Vice Premier on 30 April 2013.
1	Sukhumi	Daur Arshba		Vice Speaker (12 November 2014 – 10 October 2016)	MP since 19 July 2013, elected in a by-election. Membership terminated on 10 October 2016 after appointment as Presidential Administration Head.
2	Sukhumi	Aslan Kobakhia			Membership terminated on 10 October 2016 after appointment as Vice Premier and Interior Minister.
3	Sukhumi	Beslan Tsvinaria			
4	Sukhumi	Valeri Agrba		Chairman of the Committee for Legal Policy, State Building and Human Rights	
5	Sukhumi	Akhra Bzhania		Chairman of the Committee for Education, Science, Culture, Religion, Youth and Sport	
6	Sukhumi	Artur Mikvabia			Membership terminated on 1 April 2015 due to appointment as Prime Minister
6	Sukhumi	Tengiz Agrba			Elected on 24 May 2015
7	Sukhumi	Zaur Iazychba			
8	Pitsunda	Beslan Gubaz	Shamba faction		
9	Bzyb	Valeri Bganba		Speaker	
10	Gagra	Anzor Kokoskeria	Apsadgyl		
11	Gagra	Beslan Bartsits			Membership terminated on 21 October 2014 after appointment as acting Governor of Gagra District
11	Gagra	Temur Gulia	Shamba faction		Elected on 21 December 2014
12	Gantiadi	Vagashak Kosyan		Vice Speaker	
13	Otkhura	Georgi Agrba	Apsadgyl	Chairman of the Committee for Budget, Credit Institutions, Tax and Finance	
14	Duripsh	Guram Barganjia	Apsadgyl	Chairman of the Committee for Economic Policy, Reform and Innovation	
15	Lykhny	Mihail Sangulia	Shamba faction		
16	Gudauta	Leonid Chamagua			
17	Aatsin	Dmitri Gunba			
18	New Athos	Akhra Pachulia	Apsadgyl		
19	Eshera	Fazlibei Avidzba	Apsadgyl	Chairman of the Committee for Defence and National Security	
20	Gumista	Levon Galustyan	Shamba faction		
21	Besleti	Valeri Kvarchia		Vice Speaker (since 2 November 2016)	Elected in rerun on 4 June 2012 after original election was declared invalid due to opened ballot bags.
22	Pshap	Robert Yaylyan	Shamba faction		
23	Machara	Said Kharazia			
24	Dranda	Adgur Kharazia		Vice Speaker (until 21 October 2014)	Membership terminated on 21 October 2014 after appointment as acting Mayor of Sukhumi
24	Dranda	Sergei Shamba	Shamba faction		Elected on 28 December 2014
25	Beslakhuba	Yuri Zukhba		Chairman of the Committee for International and Inter-Parliamentary Relations and Relations with Compatriots	
26	Chlou	Temur Logua			Found dead on 25 May 2012
26	Chlou	Beslan Butba			Elected on 5 August 2012, membership terminated on 18 June 2014 after appointment as acting Vice Premier.
26	Chlou	Almas Japua			Since 1 September 2014
27	Kutoli	Appolon Gurgulia		Chairman of the Committee for Social Policy, Labour and Health	
28	Atara	Temur Kvitsinia			
29	Ochamchire	Otari Tsvizhba		Vice Speaker	
30	Tkvarcheli	Raul Khajimba			Membership terminated on 7 October 2014 after inauguration as President of Abkhazia
30	Tkvarcheli	Taifun Ardzinba	Shamba faction		Elected on 21 December 2014
31	Tkvarcheli	Kan Kvarchia		Chairman of the Committee for Agrarian Policy, Natural Resources and Ecology (since 7 October 2014)	
32	Uakum	Emma Gamisonia		Vice Speaker	
33	Chuburkhinji	Akhra Kvekveskiri			
34	Gali	Nodik Kvitsinia		Chairman of the Committee for Agrarian Policy, Natural Resources and Ecology (until 7 October 2014?)	
35	Shashikvar	Bezhan Ubiria			
