= 2022 Abkhazian parliamentary election =

- 12 March 2022 (first round); 26 March 2022 (second round); 14 and 28 May 2022 (reruns)
- All 35 seats in the People's Assembly; 18 seats needed for a majority
- Turnout: 51.2% (first round), 54.5% (second round)
Party	Leader	Vote %	Seats	+/–
Amtsakhara	Alexey Tsugba	9.09	5	+5
Aitaira	Leonid Lakerbaia	1.38	1	+1
Independents	–	90.59	29	+3
This lists parties that won seats. See the complete results below.
Results
Speaker of the People's Assembly before	Speaker of the People's Assembly after
Valery Kvarchia; Independent	Lasha Ashuba; Independent

Parliamentary elections were held in Abkhazia on 12 March 2022, with a second round taking place on 26 March.

== Campaign ==
Abkhazia is a republic whose territory is part of Georgia and which proclaimed itself independent in 1992. Only Russia, Nicaragua, Venezuela, Nauru and Syria recognize this independence. In the previous parliamentary elections in 2017, Georgia said it considered these elections illegal under international law, with its Foreign Minister condemning the vote as "a new attempt to legitimize ethnic cleansing, military intervention and occupation of Georgian territory resulting from Russian aggression."

123 candidates – 107 men and 16 women – ran for seats in the 35-member People's Assembly. 19 nominees were incumbent lawmakers running for re-election. The Abkhaz Central Election Commission closed registration for candidates on 2 March. The Abkhaz government opposition requested a prolongation of the current legislature term to launch an impeachment process against president Aslan Bzhania but those requests were not answered.

== Electoral system ==
The 35 members of the unicameral People's Assembly are elected from single-member constituencies by two-round system for five year terms.

== Results ==
Party	First round			Second round			Rerun elections			Total seats
Party	Votes	%	Seats	Votes	%	Seats	Votes	%	Seats	Total seats
Amtsakhara	5,962	9.09	0			5				5
Aitaira	906	1.38	0				1,279	28.70	1	1
Apsny	734	1.12	0							0
People's Party of Abkhazia	229	0.35	0							0
Party for the Economic Development	129	0.20	0							0
People's Front for Development and Justice	29	0.04	0							0
Independents	57,580	87.82	17			12	3,178	71.30	1	29
Total	65,569	100.00	17			17	4,457	100.00	2	35
Valid votes	65,569	96.21					4,457	97.61		
Invalid/blank votes	2,580	3.79					109	2.39		
Total votes	68,149	100.00					4,566	100.00		
Registered voters/turnout	133,474	51.06								

== Results by constituency ==
17 of the 35 constituencies elected members in the first round. At least 15 of these seats were held by supporters of the government.

=== 1st Constituency (New District) ===
Candidate	Party	First round		Second round	
Candidate	Party	Votes	%	Votes	%
Inar Gitsba	Independent	933	45.56	1,287	
Gunda Kvitsinia	Independent	630	30.76		
Ramaz Jopua	Independent	485	23.68		
Total		2,048	100.00		
Valid votes		2,048	96.56		
Invalid/blank votes		73	3.44		
Total votes		2,121	100.00		
Registered voters/turnout		5,234	40.52		
Source: Sputnik Abkhazia (first round), CEC of Abkhazia (second round)

=== 2nd Constituency (New District) ===
Candidate	Party	First round		Second round	
Candidate	Party	Votes	%	Votes	%
Dmitriy Halbad	Independent	710	49.10	1,004	49.51
Astamur Gerhelia	Amtsakhara	614	42.46	1,024	50.49
Beslan Avidzba	Independent	66	4.56		
Yelena Zhilinskaya	Independent	56	3.87		
Total		1,446	100.00	2,028	100.00
Valid votes		1,446	95.76		
Invalid/blank votes		64	4.24		
Total votes		1,510	100.00		
Registered voters/turnout		5,237	28.83		
Source: Sputnik Abkhazia (first round), CEC of Abkhazia (second round)

=== 3rd Constituency (Stariy Poselok) ===
Candidate	Party	First round		Second round	
Candidate	Party	Votes	%	Votes	%
Narsou Salakaya	Independent	755	42.82	1,215	
Khyna Dumaa	Independent	447	25.35		
Beslan Torchua	Amtsakhara	302	17.13		
Said Dgebia	Independent	210	11.91		
Gennady Ardzinba	Independent	49	2.78		
Total		1,763	100.00		
Valid votes		1,763	95.14		
Invalid/blank votes		90	4.86		
Total votes		1,853	100.00		
Registered voters/turnout		5,051	36.69		
Source: Sputnik Abkhazia (first round), CEC of Abkhazia (second round)

=== 4th Constituency (Severny) ===
Candidate	Party	First round		Second round	
Candidate	Party	Votes	%	Votes	%
Batal Aiba	Independent	475	24.32		
Erik Rshtuni	Independent	429	21.97	1,015	
Dmitriy Zhiba	Independent	318	16.28		
Shamil Adzynba	Independent	314	16.08		
David Ckheidze	Independent	214	10.96		
Alias Asabua	Independent	203	10.39		
Total		1,953	100.00		
Valid votes		1,953	97.41		
Invalid/blank votes		52	2.59		
Total votes		2,005	100.00		
Registered voters/turnout		3,849	52.09		
Source: Sputnik Abkhazia (first round), CEC of Abkhazia (second round)

=== 5th Constituency (Sinopsky) ===
Candidate	Party	Votes	%
Lasha Ashuba	Independent	1,872	100.00
Total		1,872	100.00
Valid votes		1,872	98.42
Invalid/blank votes		30	1.58
Total votes		1,902	100.00
Registered voters/turnout		3,997	47.59
Source: Sputnik Abkhazia

=== 6th Constituency (Centralny) ===
Candidate	Party	First round		Second round	
Candidate	Party	Votes	%	Votes	%
Dmitriy Marshan	Independent	1,096	41.72	1,763	
Raul Lolua	Independent	487	18.54		
Erast Agumaa	Independent	438	16.67		
Dmitry Amichba	Independent	295	11.23		
Alkhas Aslandzia	Independent	255	9.71		
Konstantin Tuzhba	Independent	56	2.13		
Total		2,627	100.00		
Valid votes		2,627	97.40		
Invalid/blank votes		70	2.60		
Total votes		2,697	100.00		
Registered voters/turnout		5,548	48.61		
Source: Sputnik Abkhazia (first round), CEC of Abkhazia (second round)

=== 7th Constituency (Biblioteka) ===
Candidate	Party	First round		Second round	
Candidate	Party	Votes	%	Votes	%
Rashida Aiba	Independent	574	22.47	1,213	
Amiran Kakalia	Independent	487	19.06		
Adgur Lagvilava	Independent	404	15.81		
Ruslan Inapshba	Independent	291	11.39		
Temur Rekvava	Independent	279	10.92		
Alexey Archelia	Independent	215	8.41		
Beslan Karchava	Independent	126	4.93		
Lasha Zukhba	Independent	110	4.31		
Beslan Achba	Independent	69	2.70		
Total		2,555	100.00		
Valid votes		2,555	99.07		
Invalid/blank votes		24	0.93		
Total votes		2,579	100.00		
Registered voters/turnout		5,419	47.59		
Source: Sputnik Abkhazia (first round), CEC of Abkhazia (second round)

=== 8th Constituency (Mayaksky) ===
Another election were held on 11 June in the 8th constituency as both candidates received the same number of votes in the second round, a first in Abkhaz history.

Candidate	Party	First round		Second round	
Candidate	Party	Votes	%	Votes	%
Naur Narmania	Independent	516	26.85	989	50.00
Leon Gubaz	Independent	445	23.15	989	50.00
Irakly Chachkhalia	Independent	361	18.78		
Vitali Gabnia	Apsny	235	12.23		
Astamur Kakalia	People's Party	229	11.91		
Anna Kalyagina	Party for the Economic Development	91	4.73		
Anetta Bganba	Independent	45	2.34		
Total		1,922	100.00	1,978	100.00
Valid votes		1,922	95.72		
Invalid/blank votes		86	4.28		
Total votes		2,008	100.00		
Registered voters/turnout		4,081	49.20		
Source: Sputnik Abkhazia (first round), CEC of Abkhazia (second round)

Rerun election results
Candidate	Party	First round		Second round	
Candidate	Party	Votes	%	Votes	%
Naur Narmania	Independent	776		1,149	52.16
Leon Gubaz	Independent	695		1,054	47.84
Irakly Chachkhalia	Independent				
Timur Kvekveskiri	Independent				
Jansukh Adleybah	Independent				
Total				2,203	100.00
Valid votes				2,203	98.22
Invalid/blank votes				40	1.78
Total votes		2,254	–	2,243	100.00
Registered voters/turnout		4,063	55.48		
Source: Civil.ge (first round), Sputnik Abkhazia (second round)

=== 9th Constituency (Vostochny) ===
Candidate	Party	Votes	%
Kan Kvarchia	Independent	1,172	54.74
David Piliya	Independent	766	35.78
Shabat Dzhikirba	Independent	93	4.34
Said Gezerdava	Independent	72	3.36
Alexander Basaria	Party for the Economic Development	38	1.77
Total		2,141	100.00
Valid votes		2,141	98.17
Invalid/blank votes		40	1.83
Total votes		2,181	100.00
Registered voters/turnout		3,033	71.91
Source: Sputnik Abkhazia

=== 10th Constituency (Pitsundsky) ===
Candidate	Party	Votes	%
Daut Khutaba	Independent	1,306	100.00
Total		1,306	100.00
Valid votes		1,306	98.27
Invalid/blank votes		23	1.73
Total votes		1,329	100.00
Registered voters/turnout		4,364	30.45
Source: Sputnik Abkhazia

=== 11th Constituency (Bzypsky) ===
Candidate	Party	Votes	%
Timur Beiia	Independent	1,628	82.60
Artur Ankvab	Independent	191	9.69
Evgeny Kondzharia	Independent	152	7.71
Total		1,971	100.00
Valid votes		1,971	93.81
Invalid/blank votes		130	6.19
Total votes		2,101	100.00
Registered voters/turnout		5,276	39.82
Source: Sputnik Abkhazia

=== 12th Constituency (Gagrsky) ===
Candidate	Party	Votes	%
Astamur Arshba	Independent	1,250	53.35
Daut Agrba	Independent	760	32.44
Akhra Abidzhba	Independent	247	10.54
Samson Demerdzhiba	Independent	86	3.67
Total		2,343	100.00
Valid votes		2,343	95.91
Invalid/blank votes		100	4.09
Total votes		2,443	100.00
Registered voters/turnout		4,542	53.79
Source: Sputnik Abkhazia

=== 13th Constituency (Gagrsky Gorodskoy) ===
Candidate	Party	First round		Second round	
Candidate	Party	Votes	%	Votes	%
Alhas Bartsits	Independent	1,490	50.49	2,109	
Revaz Benia	Independent	638	21.62		
Alexander Tsishba	Independent	632	21.42		
Izolda Khagba	Independent	191	6.47		
Total		2,951	100.00		
Valid votes		2,951	96.63		
Invalid/blank votes		103	3.37		
Total votes		3,054	100.00		
Registered voters/turnout		6,984	43.73		
Source: Sputnik Abkhazia (first round), CEC of Abkhazia (second round)

=== 14th Constituency (Tsandrypshsky) ===
Candidate	Party	Votes	%
Galust Trapizonyan	Amtsakhara	1,819	100.00
Total		1,819	100.00
Valid votes		1,819	96.65
Invalid/blank votes		63	3.35
Total votes		1,882	100.00
Registered voters/turnout		5,353	35.16
Source: Sputnik Abkhazia

=== 15th Constituency (Otkharsky) ===
Candidate	Party	First round		Second round	
Candidate	Party	Votes	%	Votes	%
Badrik Pilia	Independent	694	34.73	1,130	
Almaskhan Bartsits	Independent	667	33.38		
Valery Sichinava	Independent	504	25.23		
Ivan Tarba	Independent	133	6.66		
Total		1,998	100.00		
Valid votes		1,998	97.08		
Invalid/blank votes		60	2.92		
Total votes		2,058	100.00		
Registered voters/turnout		2,967	69.36		
Source: Sputnik Abkhazia

=== 16th Constituency (Duripshsky) ===
Candidate	Party	Votes	%
Beslan Khalvash	Independent	1,366	73.24
Dzhugelia Astamur	Apsny	499	26.76
Total		1,865	100.00
Valid votes		1,865	95.69
Invalid/blank votes		84	4.31
Total votes		1,949	100.00
Registered voters/turnout		4,055	48.06
Source: Sputnik Abkhazia

=== 17th Constituency (Lykhnynsky) ===
Candidate	Party	Votes	%
Aslan Lakoba	Independent	1,334	65.78
Farid Kobakhiya	Independent	694	34.22
Total		2,028	100.00
Valid votes		2,028	96.53
Invalid/blank votes		73	3.47
Total votes		2,101	100.00
Registered voters/turnout		3,767	55.77
Source: Sputnik Abkhazia

=== 18th Constituency (Gudautsky Gorodskoy Pervy) ===
Neither candidate in the 18th constituency won a majority of the vote (invalid votes are counted). For Leonid Lakerbaia, it was the difference of a single vote. According to the law, another election will be held on 14 May.

Candidate	Party	Votes	%
Leonid Lakerbaia	Aitaira	906	52.34
Beslan Tarkil	Independent	825	47.66
Total		1,731	100.00
Valid votes		1,731	95.48
Invalid/blank votes		82	4.52
Total votes		1,813	100.00
Registered voters/turnout		3,691	49.12
Source: Sputnik Abkhazia

Rerun election results
Candidate	Party	Votes	%
Leonid Lakerbaia	Aitaira	1,279	56.74
Beslan Tarkil	Independent	975	43.26
Total		2,254	100.00
Valid votes		2,254	97.03
Invalid/blank votes		69	2.97
Total votes		2,323	–
Source: Civil.ge

=== 19th Constituency (Gudautsky Gorodskoy Vtoroy) ===
Candidate	Party	Votes	%
Alkhas Khagba	Independent	962	60.28
Astamyr Ahkba	Independent	634	39.72
Total		1,596	100.00
Valid votes		1,596	97.02
Invalid/blank votes		49	2.98
Total votes		1,645	100.00
Registered voters/turnout		3,181	51.71
Source: Sputnik Abkhazia

=== 20th Constituency (Aatsynskiy) ===
Candidate	Party	First round		Second round	
Candidate	Party	Votes	%	Votes	%
Alisa Gularia	Amtsakhara	837	33.19	1,451	
Rustam Markholia	Independent	628	24.90		
Oleg Otyrba	Independent	500	19.83		
Ruslan Ladaria	Independent	225	8.92		
Alias Avidzba	Independent	211	8.37		
Nonna Smyr	Independent	121	4.80		
Total		2,522	100.00		
Valid votes		2,522	95.06		
Invalid/blank votes		131	4.94		
Total votes		2,653	100.00		
Registered voters/turnout		3,797	69.87		
Source: Sputnik Abkhazia (first round), CEC of Abkhazia (second round)

=== 21st Constituency (Novoafonsky) ===
Candidate	Party	First round		Second round	
Candidate	Party	Votes	%	Votes	%
Natali Smyr	Independent	738	49.10		
Akhra Pachulia	Independent	664	44.18	928	
Madina Butba	Independent	101	6.72		
Total		1,503	100.00		
Valid votes		1,503	96.22		
Invalid/blank votes		59	3.78		
Total votes		1,562	100.00		
Registered voters/turnout		2,607	59.92		
Source: Sputnik Abkhazia (first round), CEC of Abkhazia (second round)

=== 22nd Constituency (Eshersky) ===
Candidate	Party	First round		Second round	
Candidate	Party	Votes	%	Votes	%
Almaskhan Ardzinba	Independent	538	44.72		
Fazlibey Avidzba	Independent	364	30.26	741	
Akhra Smyr	Independent	301	25.02		
Total		1,203	100.00		
Valid votes		1,203	94.95		
Invalid/blank votes		64	5.05		
Total votes		1,267	100.00		
Registered voters/turnout		2,362	53.64		
Source: Sputnik Abkhazia (first round), CEC of Abkhazia (second round)

=== 23rd Constituency (Gumistinsky) ===
Candidate	Party	Votes	%
Levon Galustian	Independent	1,020	54.14
Artur Ichmelyan	Independent	864	45.86
Total		1,884	100.00
Valid votes		1,884	97.31
Invalid/blank votes		52	2.69
Total votes		1,936	100.00
Registered voters/turnout		3,305	58.58
Source: Sputnik Abkhazia

=== 24th Constituency (Pshapsky) ===
Candidate	Party	Votes	%
Ashot Minosyan	Independent	1,057	67.93
Ashot Oksuzyan	Independent	405	26.03
Khachik Takmazyan	Independent	94	6.04
Total		1,556	100.00
Valid votes		1,556	95.05
Invalid/blank votes		81	4.95
Total votes		1,637	100.00
Registered voters/turnout		3,350	48.87
Source: Sputnik Abkhazia

=== 25th Constituency (Macharsky) ===
Candidate	Party	Votes	%
Inar Sadzba	Independent	1,314	53.44
Said Kharazia	Independent	1,145	46.56
Total		2,459	100.00
Valid votes		2,459	95.24
Invalid/blank votes		123	4.76
Total votes		2,582	100.00
Registered voters/turnout		5,199	49.66
Source: Sputnik Abkhazia

=== 26th Constituency (Drandsky) ===
Candidate	Party	Votes	%
Adgur Kharazia	Independent	1,158	53.51
Ilya Gunia	Independent	748	34.57
Yelena Chachkhalia	Independent	258	11.92
Total		2,164	100.00
Valid votes		2,164	93.96
Invalid/blank votes		139	6.04
Total votes		2,303	100.00
Registered voters/turnout		3,950	58.30
Source: Sputnik Abkhazia

=== 27th Constituency (Baslakhusky) ===
Candidate	Party	Votes	%
Venori Bebia	Independent	966	68.90
Grigoriy Latsuzhba	Independent	436	31.10
Total		1,402	100.00
Valid votes		1,402	95.57
Invalid/blank votes		65	4.43
Total votes		1,467	100.00
Registered voters/turnout		2,367	61.98
Source: Sputnik Abkhazia

=== 28th Constituency (Gupsky) ===
Candidate	Party	First round		Second round	
Candidate	Party	Votes	%	Votes	%
Demur Gogia	Independent	523	34.64	928	
Tengiz Kakubava	Amtsakhara	464	30.73		
Astamur Logua	Independent	418	27.68		
Erik Khashba	Independent	105	6.95		
Total		1,510	100.00		
Valid votes		1,510	94.43		
Invalid/blank votes		89	5.57		
Total votes		1,599	100.00		
Registered voters/turnout		2,170	73.69		
Source: Sputnik Abkhazia (first round), CEC of Abkhazia (second round)

=== 29th Constituency (Chlousky) ===
Candidate	Party	First round		Second round	
Candidate	Party	Votes	%	Votes	%
Almas Akaba	Amtsakhara	789	46.47	1,038	
Astamur Tarba	Independent	593	34.92		
Astanda Dzhopua	Independent	316	18.61		
Total		1,698	100.00		
Valid votes		1,698	94.07		
Invalid/blank votes		107	5.93		
Total votes		1,805	100.00		
Registered voters/turnout		2,503	72.11		
Source: Sputnik Abkhazia (first round), CEC of Abkhazia (second round)

=== 30th Constituency (Kutolsky) ===
Candidate	Party	Votes	%
Vakhtang Golandzia	Independent	1,006	60.17
Aslan Basaria	Independent	666	39.83
Total		1,672	100.00
Valid votes		1,672	96.42
Invalid/blank votes		62	3.58
Total votes		1,734	100.00
Registered voters/turnout		2,462	70.43
Source: Sputnik Abkhazia

=== 31st Constituency (Kyndygsky) ===
Candidate	Party	Votes	%
Rezo Zantaria	Independent	940	58.93
Garry Kokaya	Independent	655	41.07
Total		1,595	100.00
Valid votes		1,595	95.68
Invalid/blank votes		72	4.32
Total votes		1,667	100.00
Registered voters/turnout		2,354	70.82
Source: Sputnik Abkhazia

=== 32nd Constituency (Ochamchyrsky) ===
Candidate	Party	First round		Second round	
Candidate	Party	Votes	%	Votes	%
Batal Jopua	Independent	871	43.59	1,189	
Eshsou Kakalia	Independent	535	26.78		
Milana Tsvizhba	Independent	524	26.23		
Gunda Tsvizhba	Independent	68	3.40		
Total		1,998	100.00		
Valid votes		1,998	96.43		
Invalid/blank votes		74	3.57		
Total votes		2,072	100.00		
Registered voters/turnout		4,098	50.56		
Source: Sputnik Abkhazia (first round), CEC of Abkhazia (second round)

=== 33rd Constituency (Tkuarchalskiy Pervyy) ===
Candidate	Party	First round		Second round	
Candidate	Party	Votes	%	Votes	%
Beslan Emurkhba	Amtsakhara	913	44.71	1,372	
Damir Gorzolia	Independent	541	26.49		
Taifun Ardzinba	Independent	482	23.60		
Aslan Kmuzov	Independent	106	5.19		
Total		2,042	100.00		
Valid votes		2,042	99.08		
Invalid/blank votes		19	0.92		
Total votes		2,061	100.00		
Registered voters/turnout		3,894	52.93		
Source: Sputnik Abkhazia (first round), CEC of Abkhazia (second round)

=== 34th Constituency (Tkuarchalskiy Vtoroy) ===
Candidate	Party	First round		Second round	
Candidate	Party	Votes	%	Votes	%
German Kacharava	Independent	626	46.40	854	
Temur Tkebuchava	Independent	402	29.80		
Abesalom Kvarchia	Independent	180	13.34		
Romeo Cherkezia	Independent	141	10.45		
Total		1,349	100.00		
Valid votes		1,349	94.67		
Invalid/blank votes		76	5.33		
Total votes		1,425	100.00		
Registered voters/turnout		1,982	71.90		
Source: Sputnik Abkhazia (first round), CEC of Abkhazia (second round)

=== 35th Constituency (Galsky) ===
Candidate	Party	Votes	%
Temur Shegrelia	Independent	604	56.08
Beslan Arshba	Amtsakhara	224	20.80
Anas Kishamria	Independent	215	19.96
Lasha Sakania	People's Front	29	2.69
Saria Chamagua	Independent	5	0.46
Total		1,077	100.00
Valid votes		1,077	93.82
Invalid/blank votes		71	6.18
Total votes		1,148	100.00
Registered voters/turnout		1,445	79.45
Source: Sputnik Abkhazia

== Aftermath ==
Elections in the first round were accompanied by relatively low turnout, averaging 51%, and in some constituencies, notably Sukhumi and West Abkhazia, it was well below 40%. This has raised questions from some media observers about the local politicians' trust in the general population. There were reports of candidates ignoring the normal debates and focusing on service in their local communities instead, including installing new power transformers and fixing up rural roads. This was accompanied by candidates who had not been involved in politics winning or advancing to the second round at a high rate.

=== Government formation ===
Parties and candidates in favor of Aslan Bzhania won an absolute majority after the results of the second round.

On 12 April 2022 Lasha Ashuba, generally seen as an ally of Bzhania, was unanimously elected as speaker by the 33 already elected deputies to the People's Assembly, as two members are yet to be elected in repeat elections.
