= 2011 Abkhazian local elections =

- 12 February 2011
- District and city assemblies (5th convocation)
Party	Leader	Vote %	Seats	+/–
Independents / Local Candidates				
This lists parties that won seats. See the complete results below.

On 12 February 2011, Abkhazia held local elections for the 5th convocations of its local assemblies.

== Background and Abkhazia-wide figures ==
Candidates could be nominated between 23 January and 2 February by interest groups or by officially registered political parties. However, the governing United Abkhazia was the only party to make use this possibility on a large scale, and none of the opposition parties did so. In total, a number of 353 candidates competed in 186 single-seat constituencies. All heads of administration except for Gudauta District Head Daur Vozba were re-elected to their assembly, and re-appointed by President Sergei Bagapsh on 23 February.

== City of Sukhumi ==
=== Turn-out ===
The voter lists numbered a total of 30,712 people, of which 26,957 were on the principal voter list and 3755 on additional lists. Of these latter ones, 452 belonged to military units and 73 to hospital units. In total, 11,775 people voted, i.e. 38.3%.

=== Candidates ===
In Sukhumi, the election was contested by 85 candidates in 26 single-seat constituencies. Shortly before election day, 3 people had withdrawn their candidacy. Among the candidates were the incumbent Mayor of Sukhumi Alias Labakhua, as well as 14 sitting members of the city council. Of these, 5 were re-elected (including Labakhua). None of the 12 female candidates was elected. United Abkhazia had nominated candidates in all 26 constituencies, 16 of which won. The Communist Party and the Sukhumi Military School had nominated 2 and 1 candidates, respectively, all of which lost. The remaining candidates had been nominated by 64 initiative groups, 10 of these independent candidates won a seat (including Daut Nanba after the re-run in constituency #1).

=== Rerun in constituency #1 ===
On 16 February, the Sukhumi election commission ordered a rerun in constituency #1, because there had been a soldier who had voted at 2 constituencies, and another voter from another constituency. Preliminary results had indicated a victory for independent candidate Daut Nanba. Repeated elections were scheduled for 16 April. Candidates had to be nominated between 7 and 27 March and registered between 28 March and 7 April. Only Daut Nanba, Guram Berulava and Aslan Sangulia participated the second time around, Nanba again won.

=== Overview of the candidates and elected deputies ===
The following table presents an overview of all the candidates in the 26 constituencies:

**Candidates in the 2011 Sukhumi City Council election** by constituency (vertical) and candidacy (horizontal) slanted = incumbent, **bold** = winner, green = nominated by United Abkhazia, red = nominated by the Communist Party, blue = nominated by Sukhumi Military School
#	**1.**	**2.**	**3.**	**4.**	**5.**	**6.**	**7.**	**8.**
**1**	Aslan Sangulia	**Daut Nanba**	Guram Berulava	Dmitrii Adleiba	Dmitrii Gabelia			
**2**	Nina Storozhenko	**Lasha Kiut**						
**3**	**Aslan Ajapua**	Astamur Logua	Aleksandr Antinov					
**4**	Artur Lakyrba	**Apollon Lataria**	Eduard Keshanidi					
**5**	Kan Kvarchia	**Adamur Lagvilava**						
**6**	**Erik Rshtuni**	Givi Gabnia						
**7**	Teia Arshba	**Kondrat Samsonia**						
**8**	Merab Chaligava	**Enver Chamagua**	Dmitrii Kolbaia					
**9**	Astanda Avidzba	Adamyr Mukba	Irina Kvarchia	Joni Kvasia	**Mizan Zantaria**	Stela Sadzba	Alias Golandzia	
**10**	Jansukh Chamagua	Rudolf Chania	**Konstantin Pilia**					
**11**	Adgur Agrba	Izida Chania	**Amiran Kakalia**					
**12**	**Aleksei Lomia**	Aida Shulumba	Roman Adleiba					
**13**	Raul Bebia	**Beslan Karchava**	Arda Dgebia					
**14**	Vadim Kvachakhia	Georgii Manaka	Mudar Amichb	**Teimuraz Anua**				
**15**	Eduard Kalenjyan	Valeri Bganba	**Astamur Adleiba**					
**16**	Dmitri Delba	**Guram Barganjia**	Enrik Leiba					
**17**	Levon Galustyan	**Beslan Kvitsinia**						
**18**	Roland Adleiba	**Beslan Shinkuba**	Denis Arshba					
**19**	**Khrips Jopua**	Izolda Turkia	Mikhail Gabelia					
**20**	**Arnold Minaia**	Arutyun Alakortsyan	Artur Churilov	Nadezhda Khonelia				
**21**	Aslan Jinjolia	Vitalii Bganba	**Alias Labakhua**					
**22**	Daur Ferizba	Almaskhan Ebzhnou	**Dmitrii Shlarba**					
**23**	Valerian Aslanjia	Nodar Gablia	**Mizan Zukhba**	Roman Gabelia	Narsou Salakaia			
**24**	Saim Avidzba	**Vitalii Chitanava**						
**25**	Alkhas Jelia	Aleksandr Mkrtchyan	Aidar Kvitsinia	Rolan Tarba	**Roman Tskua**	Astanda Khashba	Gennadii Ardzinba	Muza Murgvliani
**26**	Almas Jopua	Eliso Tsishba	Kama Anua	**Ronald Gamgia**				

On 21 February, the new city assembly held its first session, in which it had to elect a successor for its outgoing Chairman Adgur Amichba, who had not run again in the assembly election. However, the two candidates Amiran Kakalia and Konstantin Pilia tied with 12 votes, with 1 invalid vote. The session was then adjourned until 23 February. In the second vote Amiran Kakalia beat Konstantin Pilia by 15-to-9 (with 1 invalid vote). Beslan Shinkuba was subsequently elected Deputy Chairman and former Mayor Astamur Adleiba Secretary.

== Gali District ==
In the Gali District, 26 candidates competed in 26 constituencies, all of whom were nominated by United Abkhazia. Only Abkhazian citizens --- a minority in the Gali District --- were allowed to vote. According to District Head Beslan Arshba, turn-out was around 80% in the villages, and up to 70% in Gali town.

== Gulripshi District ==
In the Gulripshi District, 22 candidates competed in 16 constituencies. The Upper Kodori Valley participated for the first time in local Abkhazian elections --- the area had been under Georgian control until it was conquered during the August 2008 War. Since most of the remaining Svan population does not possess Abkhazian citizenship, there were only 51 eligible voters, 39 of whom actually voted at the polling station in the secondary school of Azhara. The new Assembly met for the first time on 15 February, when it elected Aslan Baratelia its chairman, Andronik Kondakchyan its deputy chairman and David Gabnya its secretary.

== Gagra District ==
In the Gagra District, 61 candidates competed for 25 single-seat constituencies. 22 of the candidates were nominated by United Abkhazia.

=== Pitsunda ===
In Pitsunda, Mayor Beslan Ardzinba and six other incumbent deputies of the Assembly stood for re-election. The winning candidates were Beslan Ardzinba, Badra Avidzba, Olga Grigorenko, Chengiz Bigvava, Georgi Zardania, Gennadi Cherkezia, Gennadi Mikanba, Damia Kokoskeria and Inessa Dzkuia. On 14 February, during the first session of the new convocation, Damir Kokoskeria was elected Chairman of the Assembly over Gennadi Cherkezia, by a one-vote difference.

== Gudauta District ==
In the Gudauta District 59 candidates competed in 29 constituencies. Out of 20760 eligible voters, 9542 turned out to vote (45.96%). 17 incumbent deputies were re-elected. Of these, 13 were elected for the second time, 2 for the third time and 2 for the fourth time. District Head Daur Vozba failed to be re-elected by 92 votes. President Sergei Bagapsh appointed Valerii Malia as his successor on 23 February. On 17 February, during its first session, the Gudauta District assembly elected Roman Bazba its chairman, with 22 out of 29 votes, and Fyodor Sakania its Deputy Chairman.

== Sukhumi, Ochamchira and Tkvarcheli Districts ==
In the Sukhumi District 18 in 15 constituencies, in the Ochamchira District 55 in 32 constituencies and in the Tkvarcheli District 27 in 17 constituencies.

== Criticism ==
The Abkhazian opposition claimed that a number of violations had taken place during the election. According to Raul Khajimba, a number of people had voted multiple times at different polling stations. The elections were also criticised by representatives of several NGOs. Some of the issues singled out included the low turn-out, the lack of a contest in the Gali district and the fact that in one of the polling stations in Sukhumi, a group of soldiers had come in and closed the election. They also expressed the fear that the new councils would not reflect a great diversity of opinions, a situation not conducive to genuine political debate.

The Georgian government condemned the elections on 14 February 2011.
