= Coordinating Council of Political Parties and Public Organisations =

The Coordinating Council of Political Parties and Public Organisations unites a number of political parties and public movements in Abkhazia who support the current Government of President Khajimba.

== History ==
The Council was founded on 10 July 2013 to unite the principal parties and movements opposed to the Government of President Ankvab. Its founding members were the political parties United Abkhazia, the Forum for the National Unity of Abkhazia, the People's Party of Abkhazia and the Party for the Economic Development of Abkhazia (PEDA) as well as the public movements Akhatsa, Aruaa and Abaash, the Civil Union For the Rule of Law, Stability and Democracy and the Patriotic Movement Young Abkhazia. On 9 August, the Council was joined by two more movements, the Congress of Russian Communities of Russian Compatriots in Abkhazia, and the Coordinating Council of Russian Compatriots in Abkhazia.

The Coordinating Council organised protests that led to the May 2014 revolution against Ankvab. Its candidate Raul Khajimba, chairman of the Forum for the National Unity of Abkhazia, won the presidential election organised in August.

On 9 February 2016, United Abkhazia announced that it was leaving the Coordinating Council, claiming that the role of the Council had been marginalised by the government. On 29 February, United Abkhazia, the PEDA and the People's Party became founding members of the Council for the National Unity of the Republic of Abkhazia, uniting political forces that are neither pro-government nor pro-opposition.
