= Nodik Kvitsinia =

Abkhaz politician and murderer

Member of Parliament for Constituency no. 34 (Gali)
- Incumbent
- Assumed office 3 April 2012
- Preceded by: Viacheslav Vardania

Personal details
- Born: 1957 (age 68–69) Atara

Nodik Kvitsinia is a member of the People's Assembly of Abkhazia who was convicted for the murder of Russian businessman Sergei Klemantovich and his partner Oksana Skarednova.

== Early life ==
Kvitsinia was born in 1957 in the village of Atara, Ochamchira District.

== Political career ==
In the March 2012 elections, Kvitsinia successfully ran as an independent candidate for a seat of the 5th convocation of the People's Assembly of Abkhazia in constituency no. 34 (Gali), defeating in the first round two opponents nominated by political parties with 54.52% of the votes.

On 10 April, as parliamentary committees were composed, Kvitsinia was elected chairman of the Committee for Agrarian Policy, Natural Resources and Ecology. Kvitsinia was voted out of this post after he had come under investigation for the murder of Sergei Klemantovich and Oksana Skarednova, and on 7 October 2014, Kan Kvarchia was elected his successor.

== Murder of Sergei Klemantovich and Oksana Skarednova ==
In September 2012, Sergei Klemantovich, the Director of the Russian-Abkhazian scrap metal joint venture EL-Petroleum — Abkhazia disappeared along with his partner Oksana Skarednova. According to investigators, Kvitsinia organised the kidnapping of the pair on 11 September and held them on the outskirts of Sukhumi. When Klemantovich refused to pay a ransom of 2 million American dollars, Kvitsinia paid his henchmen 15 million rubles for their murder, in the village of Adziubzha, Ochamchira District, on the night of 12 September. Their corpses were subsequently dumped into the well of an uninhabited house.

On 11 October 2013, Kvitsinia's four henchmen were detained, and on 14 October, the bodies of Klemantovich and Skarednova were recovered. On 12 December 2014, Kvitsinia was formally indicted. The trial started on 24 March 2015. On 28 October 2016, Kvitsinia was convicted on the murder charges and sentenced to 16 years of strict regime prison (the prosecution had asked for 20 years).

By 16 November, Kvitsinia, not present during the pronouncement of the verdict, was still at large, and he was officially declared wanted.

On 16 February 2017, the Cassation Chamber of Abkhazia's Supreme Court ordered a retrial. On 22 February, Kvitsinia was arrested in Sukhumi.
