= 2005 Abkhazian presidential election =

- 12 January 2005
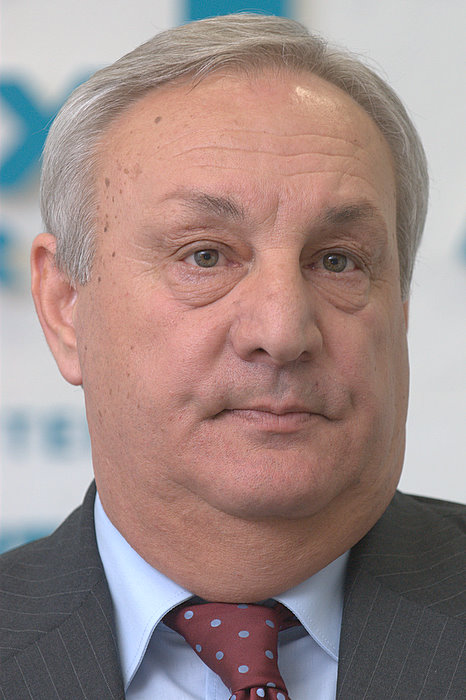

Nominee	Sergei Bagapsh	Iakub Lakoba
Party	United Abkhazia	People's Party
Running mate	Raul Khajimba	Stella Gunia
Popular vote	69,328	3,549
Percentage	92.60%	4.74%
President before election
Vladislav Ardzinba
Independent
Elected President
Sergei Bagapsh
United Abkhazia

Presidential elections were held in Abkhazia on 12 January 2005. The result was a victory for Sergei Bagapsh of United Abkhazia, who received over 90% of the vote.

== Background ==
A presidential election had been held in Abkhazia on 3 October, but had resulted in a prolonged conflict over the results between the two main contenders, Raul Khadjimba, who had been prime minister and who was backed by the seriously ailing outgoing president Vladislav Ardzinba and by Russia, and Sergei Bagapsh, the main opposition candidate who had received a narrow majority of the votes. On 5 December 2004 Bagapsh and Khadjimba agreed to hold new elections. In these elections they would run on a joint ticket, with Khadjimba as vice presidential candidate.

== Campaign ==
On 17 December, Sergei Bagapsh was officially nominated by an initiative group. On 21 December, Bagapsh and Khajimba created a joint coordinating council to run their election campaign, consisting of five representatives each: Nugzar Agrba, Valeri Kvarchia, Vakhtang Pipia, Daur Tarba, Alik Logua, Roman Gvinjia, Raul Khonelia, Beslan Kobakhia, Vasili Avidzba and Timur Nadaria, cochaired by Agrba for Bagapsh and Kvarchia for Khajimba.

In the early morning of 23 December an explosion occurred in the centre of Sukhumi, causing no casualties. Later that day, Iakub Lakoba, who had come fifth and last in the first election, was nominated by an initiative group.

Bagapsh and Lakoba were officially registered as candidates by the Central Election Commission on 28 December.

== Results ==
Candidate	Party	Votes	%
Sergei Bagapsh	United Abkhazia	69,328	92.60
Iakub Lakoba	People's Party of Abkhazia	3,549	4.74
Against all		1,988	2.66
Total		74,865	100.00
Valid votes		74,865	98.85
Invalid/blank votes		868	1.15
Total votes		75,733	100.00
Registered voters/turnout		129,127	58.65
Source: Kavkaz Uzel

== Aftermath ==
On 2 June 2005, United Abkhazia suspended the membership of Sergei Bagapsh, as required by the Abkhazian constitution since he had become president.
