= 4th convocation of the Sukhumi City Council =

The 4th convocation of the Sukhumi City Council held office from 10 March 2007 until March 2011.

== Formation ==
=== 2011 City Council election ===
The 26 seats of the Sukhumi Municipal assembly were contested by 66 candidates.

=== Rerun in constituencies no. 3, 19 and 26 ===
Elections in constituencies no. 3, 19 and 26 were judged invalid, in the latter two cases because turnout had not surpassed 25%. Reruns were scheduled for 1 April, with the nomination period running from 20 February to 12 March and the registration period from 13 to 22 March.

== By-election ==
=== Constituency no. 21 ===
In April 2007, while President Sergei Bagapsh was in Moscow for medical treatment, the results of an investigation into corruption within the Sukhumi city administration were made public. The investigation found that large sums had been embezzled and upon his return, on 2 May, Bagapsh fired Adleiba along with his deputy Boris Achba, the head of the Sukhumi's finance department Konstantin Tuzhba and the head of the housing department David Jinjolia.

On 4 June Adleiba paid back to the municipal budget 200,000 rubels. On 20 July, Adleiba resigned from the Sukhumi City Council, citing health reasons and the need to travel abroad for medical treatment.

The subsequent by-election was held on 2 September, the nomination period lasting from 24 July to 12 August and the registration period from 13 to 23 August. Alias Labakhua was the only candidate in the by-election, he had already been appointed acting mayor on 15 May. Labakhua was elected with 265 votes in favour and 2 against. The election was declared valid with a turnout of 34% (267 out of 789 registered voters). On 18 September Labakhua was permanently appointed mayor by President Bagapsh.

== Composition ==
=== Leadership ===
On 21 February, the new city assembly director of the Sukhumi shoe factory Adgur Amichba as its chairman with 15 out of 23 votes, over outgoing Chairman Givi Gabnia. Head of the state company Abkhazavtotrans Raul Bebia was elected deputy chairman, history teacher Nina Storozhenko was elected secretary.

=== List of members ===
| # | Name | Position | Notes |
|---|---|---|---|
| 1 | Said Kur-ipa | | |
| 2 | Nina Storozhenko | Secretary | |
| 3 | Daur Dgebia | | |
| 4 | Gudisa Agrba | | |
| 5 | Kan Kvarchia | | |
| 6 | Diana Kerselyan | | |
| 7 | Kondrat Samsonia | | |
| 8 | Dmitri Chukbar | | |
| 9 | Irina Kvarchia | | |
| 10 | Beslan Tania | | |
| 11 | Amiran Kakalia | | |
| 12 | Adgur Basaria | | |
| 13 | Givi Gabnia | | |
| 14 | Vadim Kvachakhia | | |
| 15 | Valeri Bganba | | |
| 16 | Dmitri Delba | | |
| 17 | Marina Berulava | | |
| 18 | Denis Arshba | | |
| 19 | Rolan Alan | | |
| 20 | Izolda Turkia | | |
| 21 | Astamur Adleiba | | resigned on 23 July 2007 |
| 21 | Alias Labakhua | | Elected in by-election on 2 September 2007 |
| 22 | Tina Gvaramia | | |
| 23 | Raul Bebia | Deputy Chairman | |
| 24 | Adgur Amichba | Chairman | |
| 25 | Viachelav Bobylev | | |
| 26 | Roland Gamgia | | |
