= Kan Kvarchia =

Abkhazian politician

Member of Parliament for Constituency no. 31 (Tkvarcheli)
- Incumbent
- Assumed office 3 April 2012
- Preceded by: Aleksandr Chengelia

Acting Head of Sukhum City Administration
- In office 21 October 2019 – 30 April 2020
- Preceded by: Adgur Kharazia
- Succeeded by: Beslan Eshba

Personal details
- Born: 1 July 1974 (age 52) Sukhum, Abkhaz ASSR, Georgian SSR, Soviet Union
- Citizenship: Abkhazia
- Children: 3
- Education: Abkhazian State University

Kan Kvarchia (Russian: Кан Кварчия) is a member of the People's Assembly of Abkhazia in the 7th Convocation. He is a member of the State committee on State and Legal Policy and a member of the State Committee on Budget, Credit institutions, Taxes and Finances.

== Political career ==
In the March 2012 elections, Kvarchia successfully ran for a seat of the 5th convocation of the People's Assembly of Abkhazia in constituency no. 31 (Tkvarcheli), winning the first round with 39.16% of the votes against three other candidates, and defeating incumbent MP Aleksandr Chengelia in the run-off.

On 7 October 2014, Kvarchia was elected with 27 to 4 votes (out of 31 present) as chairman of the Committee for Agrarian Policy, Natural Resources and Ecology, replacing Nodik Kvitsinia, who was under investigation, and would later be convicted, for the murder of Russian businessman Sergei Klemantovich and his partner Oksana Skarednova.

On the 21st of October 2019, he was appointed Acting Head of Sukhum City Administration by President Raul Khajimba. He was in this role until the 30th of April 2020, until he was relieved by Beslan Eshba.

In the 2022 Abkhazian Parliamentary elections, Kan Kvarchia was elected in the No.9 Constituency (Vostochny) with 54.74% of the vote for the 7th convocation of the Peoples Assembly of Abkhazia.

Kan Kvarchia is son to Valery Kvarchia[ru], former deputy for Machara and speaker of the Abkhazian Peoples Assembly and head of the Aidgylara socio-political movement.

== Assassination attempt ==
On 17 October 2016, at around 7:10, a man was killed in an explosion near the office of the Abkhazian State TV and Radio. The investigation revealed that the bomb had detonated early, killing the would-be assassin, identified as a Russian citizen named SL Tarasenko, and that Kvarchia had been his intended target. On 2 November, police detained Adgur Korsentia, a member of the political council of opposition party Amtsakhara, on suspicion of involvement in the attempted attack. On 5 November, Sukhumi City Court granted his continued detention pending the investigation. On 12 November, this was confirmed on appeal.

Kvarchia was injured again during the 2024 Parliament of Abkhazia shooting on 19 December after he was shot in the arm by fellow MP Adgur Kharazia, who had also killed a third legislator, Vakhtang Golandzia, in the same incident. Kvarchia later announced his candidacy for the 2025 Abkhazian presidential election but ultimately withdrew in favour of Adgur Ardzinba, citing health reasons.

In February 2025, Russian authorities revoked his Russian citizenship. The government in Moscow considers him an “anti-Russian” figure. On the 4th of June 2026, he was sentenced to 10.5 years in prison by a Russian court in Sochi in absentia. The Parliament of Abkhazia voted to allow Kan Kvarchia to keep his parliamentary immunity, so he could not be tried in an Abkhazian Court.
