= Council for the National Unity of the Republic of Abkhazia =

Political coalition in Abkhazia

The Council for the National Unity of the Republic of Abkhazia (CNURA) (Russian: Совет национального единства Республики Абхазия (СНЕРА)) unites a number of political parties and organisations in Abkhazia who have declared that they are neither pro-government nor pro-opposition. Three of the political parties had previously been part of the pro-government Coordinating Council of Political Parties and Public Organisations.

== History ==
The CNURA was founded on 29 February 2016 by the Communist Party, the political party United Abkhazia, the Party for the Economic Development of Abkhazia (PEDA), the People's Party, the Union of Afghanistan Veterans and the Foundation for International Business Cooperation, on the initiative of United Abkhazia and the PEDA.
