= Bagramyan Battalion =

Military unit during the war in Abkhazia

- Բաղրամյան գումարտակ (Armenian); Баграмиан ибаталион (Abkhazian)
- Founder: Vagharshak Kosyan
- Leaders: Col. Sergei Matosyan; Cpt. Galust Trapizonyan; Lt. Vagharshak Kosyan
- Dates active: 9 February, 1993–1995
- Country: Abkhazia (de-facto); Georgia (de-jure)
- Allegiance: Abkhazia
- Ideology: Nationalism; Separatism
- Size: Disputed. 1,000-1,500

The Bagramyan Battalion (Armenian: Բաղրամյանի անվան գումարտակ; Russian: Батальон имени Баграмяна), officially the Marshal Ivan Bagramyan Independent Motorized Rifle Battalion (Russian: отдельный мотострелковый батальон и́мени маршала Ивана Христофоровича Баграмяна), was a military unit during the War in Abkhazia (1992–93). Composed predominantly of ethnic Armenians, it fought on the side of separatist Abkhaz forces against Georgia. The Bagramyan Battalion was disbanded after the war.

A total of 1 500 Armenians participated in the war, a quarter of the Abkhazian army. Twenty Armenians were awarded the highest honor Hero of Abkhazia and 242 were killed in battle. The first president of Abkhazia Vladislav Ardzinba praised the high discipline, organization, and accomplishments of the Bagramyan Battalion.

== History ==
=== Background ===
After the beginning of the War in Abkhazia in 1992, abuses committed by Georgian troops against Armenians were reported, as Georgians considered them allies of the Abkhazians. According to the Armenian General Benevolent Union, although the Armenians of Abkhazia originally wished to remain neutral, the looting and violence committed by the Georgian army, including reports of rape and murder, had consequently caused Armenians to favor the Abkhazian side. The Armenians of the Gagra community, which had an Armenian majority, convened a meeting of leadership where it was decided to officially support the Abkhazs and take up arms against the Georgians. A Sukhumi-based Armenian newspaper reported:

At first, we were trying not to mess around, but then the Georgians exerted so much cruelty against Armenians that we had to back the Abkhazians. They would invade the houses and rob and torture the people. In Labra, they seated a married couple on chairs with holes on the seats and burned them. They were raping the women. It was impossible to stay neutral.

=== Formation ===
An Armenian motorized infantry battalion named after Marshal of the Soviet Union Ivan Bagramyan was established under Vagharshak Kosyan on 9 February 1993 and became part of the Abkhazian armed forces. Combat vehicles of the battalion were decorated with the Armenian flag. The battalion also included women in medical platoons.

The first fight that involved the battalion, under the command of a company led by Levon Daschyan, was during the second assault Sukhumi on 15–16 March 1993. Afterwards the battalion captured a strategic and well-fortified bridge over the Gumista River.

The battalion was later joined by Nagorno-Karabakh soldiers who fought in the ranks of the Nagorno-Karabakh Defense Army for the First Nagorno-Karabakh War. They, as well as professional soldiers, including those employed under a contract, were involved in the preparations of the battalion. A second Armenian battalion was organized in Gagra. The estimated total of Armenians participants of the war is about 1,500, a quarter of the Abkhazian army. The Bagramyan Battalion is estimated to have had at least a thousand Armenians.

In September 1993, after fruitless negotiations, the Abkhaz side started an operation against Georgian forces in the Battle of Sukhumi, which was attended by both the Bagramyan Battalion. From 25–27 September, Armenian units marched deep into the city from the village Yashtuha and crawl down the street along the Besletka Chanba River. Armenians first came to the building of the Council of Ministers, the base of authority over the capital. During the storming of the city, Armenian soldiers captured 25 prisoners.

After the capture of Sukhumi, the Bagramyan Battalion was deployed in the Kodori Valley, where it was tasked to protect Armenian-populated villages. In March 1994, it began operations to capture the village of Lata. During these final stages, the battalion was commanded by Sergei Matosyan, who was the only Armenian of the war to command Abkhaz troops.

After the arrival of peacekeeping personnel, the battalion disbanded. Twenty Armenians were awarded the highest honor Hero of Abkhazia and 242 were killed in battle. The first president of Abkhazia Vladislav Ardzinba praised the high discipline, organization, and accomplishments of the Bagramyan Battalion.

The battalion was reported to have been disbanded in 1995 or 1996. Georgian reports claimed it was still active in 1998 when a fire in one of administrative buildings of the power grid in Mziuri shortly before the Six-Day War in Abkhazia (20–26 May 1998) was attributed to the battalion. In 2001 Former members of the battalion later took part in defending the Armenian majority Gulripshi District from the Chechen militant groups of Ruslan Gelayev.

== Known members ==
The following is an incomplete list of members of the Bagramyan Battalion during the 1992–1993 conflict.

=== Command staff ===
- Vagharshak Kosyan – Chief commander of the battalion, senior lieutenant. Later assigned as company commander.
- Jemal Chikirba – Battalion commander (succeeded Kusyan).
- Levon Markaryan – Chief of staff. Retired colonel, awarded 3rd grade medal "For Serving the Fatherland".
- Suren Minosyan – Battalion commissar, senior lieutenant. Former teacher and leader of the "Mashtots" community.
- Arutyun Terzyan – Battalion commissar (after Minosyan). Nominee for Hero of Abkhazia.
- V. Tatulyan – Battalion commissar (after Terzyan).
- Sedrak Cholokyan – Senior lieutenant, commander of arming and techniques.
- Sergey Zebelyan – Commander of the battalion in the rear.
- Aruta Chakryan – Medservice chief.
- S. Chakryan – Administrative service chief.
- K. Minalyan – Chief of Autobrigade.
- Z. Kalaijyan – Chief of grenadiers.
- L. Selvyan – Deputy chief of grenadiers.
- T. Kalaijyan – Chief of intelligence.
- Hayk Ustyan – Chief of Communications.

=== Sub-unit commanders and Heroes ===
- Galust Trapizonyan – Hero of Abkhazia.
- Sergey Tomasyan – Hero of Abkhazia.
- Nshan Ustyan – Platoon commander, Hero of Abkhazia.
- Vaham Rganyan – Hero of Abkhazia, anti-tank platoon Leader.
- Sarkis Karskyan – Hero of Abkhazia, 1st company commander.
- Karapet Karagozyan – Hero of Abkhazia.
- Ashot Kosyan – Hero of Abkhazia.
- Nybar Matulyan – Commander of Bziphi Group, company commander. Awarded Leon Medal.
- Saak Papazyan – Company commander.
- Petros Stefanyan – Platoon leader.
- Ursen Krbashyan – Platoon leader.

=== Other members ===
- Gevork Markaryan – Captain.
- Leon Dashyan – Awarded Leon Medal.
- Misak Kiulyan – Awarded Leon Medal.
- Gevork Zurnachyan – Awarded Leon Medal.
- Gevork Kochkonyan – Awarded Leon Medal (killed in action, March 1993).
- Andre Davityan – Representative of the Abkhazian Ministry of Defense.
- Salama Group members: Amazasp Abyan, Sarkis Kerekyan, Armen Kochoryan, Karpo Naragozyan, Gevork Kevkusyan, Robik Tevdenjyan, Andrey Magharyan, Karpo Magharyan, Akop Matosyan, Vitali Stefanidi.

=== Casualties ===
- Sergey Manutsyan – KIA March 16, 1993.
- Avak Zabunyan – Died of wounds.
- Iura Tirosyan – KIA September 1993.
- Albert Delyan – KIA.
- Misak Tuisusyan – KIA in Tsugurovka.
- Arkadi Sukiasyan – KIA July 21, 1993.
- Sergey Esoyan – Died of wounds, July 29, 1993.
- Sergey Akhanjian – Died July 3, 1993.
- Andranik Ekrusyan – KIA in helicopter.
- Samvel Minasyan – KIA July 21, 1993.
