= Iakub Lakoba =

Georgian politician (1949–2022)

Iakub Uasyl-Ipa Lakoba Иакуб Уасыл-иԥа Лакоба იაკუბ ლაკობა Якуб Васильевич Лакоба

Chairmen of People's Party of Abkhazia
- In office 1999 – 9 July 2022

Personal details
- Born: 2 August 1949 New Athos, Abkhazian ASSR, Georgian SSR, USSR
- Died: 9 July 2022 (aged 72) Sukhumi, Abkhazia
- Party: People's Party of Abkhazia
- Education: Moscow State University

Iakub Uasyl-Ipa Lakoba (Abkhaz: Иакуб Уасыл-иԥа Лакоба; Georgian: იაკუბ ლაკობა) was an opposition politician and former presidential candidate in the internationally unrecognised Republic of Abkhazia. Some called him the "Abkhaz Zhirinovsky".

== Early life and career ==
Iakub Lakoba was born 1949 in New Athos. In 1966, he graduated from Sukhumi school No. 10. In 1971, Lakoba graduated from the Moscow State University's Faculty of Law. From 1972 to 1982 he worked under Bagrat Shinkuba in the staff of the Presidium of the Supreme Council of the Abkhazian ASSR. From 1974 onwards Lakoba held several positions with the Komsomol.

From 1979 to December 1999 Lakoba was a senior lecturer in jurisprudence at the Abkhazian State University and a member of the University Academic Council. Lakoba has written a total of 18 scientific papers and participated in and lectured at several international conferences and symposia.

During the 1992-1993 war in Abkhazia, Lakoba participated in the delivery of arms and drugs and was Vice Chairman of the Committee of the Red Cross Society of Abkhazia on Foreign Relations and Law.

From April 1998 to March 2004, Lakoba was chairman of the Committee for Legal Affairs, Environment and Urban Assembly Personnel of the Sukhumi Municipal Assembly.

Since 1999 to his death in 2022, Lakoba was chairman of the opposition People's Party of Abkhazia.

== 2004 and 2005 presidential elections ==
Iakub Lakoba unsuccessfully participated in the 2004 presidential elections, in which he and his vice presidential candidate, Fatima Kvitsinia, came in fifth and last with only 800 votes. After leading candidates Sergei Bagapsh and Raul Khadjimba decided to resolve the crisis that ensued after the elections by contending on a joint presidential/vice presidential ticket in a rerun, Lakoba was the only other candidate to stand again. This time, he chose fellow party member Stella Gunia as his vice presidential candidate and the pair garnered 3,400 votes, equal to 4.7% of the total votes cast.

== Since 2005 ==
On 24 August 2009 Iakub Lakoba was awarded the order Axdz Apsha ('Honour and Glory') by President Bagapsh, for his long-term active participation in Abkhazian socio-political life.

On 15 January 2011, Lakoba published an article in response to the Russia's State Audit Chamber's findings on violations concerning Russian financial aid to Abkhazia in the period of 2009–2010. Lakoba accused the head of Russia's State Audit Chamber Sergei Stepashin of trying to paper over financial violations in Abkhazia and to extenuate corruption within the Abkhaz officialdom. Lakoba said that Stepashin was providing defense lawyer's services to the Abkhaz authorities. "Paid or not paid - its another issue," he said. On 21 January 2011, he was arrested in Sukhumi after the prosecutor's office charged him with slandering Stepashin. However, he was released the next day. Since the Russian state audit agency declared that it would not press charges, the Prosecutor's Office declared on 18 February that it had dropped the case.

On 22 November 2016, Lakoba was one of three candidates (out of a total of five nominated by President Raul Khajimba) rejected by the People's Assembly for the position of judge of the newly created Constitutional Court. Lakoba received 12 out of 35 votes, where a two-thirds majority had been necessary.

== Death ==
Iakub Lakoba died in Abkhazian capital Sukhumi on 9 July 2022 due to a serious oncological disease.
