= Galust Trapizonyan =

Abkhazian politician

- Military career
- Allegiance: Abkhazia
- Branch: Bagramyan Battalion
- Service years: 1990–1995
- Conflicts: War in Abkhazia: Capture of Sukhumi
- Awards: Hero of Abkhazia

Galust Trapizonyan (Armenian: Գալուստ Տրապիզոնյան) is an Abkhazian politician and former military commander. He is a member of the Abkhazian parliament. Trapizonyan was awarded the Hero of Abkhazia, the highest state award of Abkhazia.

== Biography ==
Trapizonyan is ethnic Armenian. On 20 January 2017, he was elected the Chairman of the Armenian community of Abkhazia. He held this role for two terms until he was succeeded in 2023 by Alik Minasyan.

Trapizonyan is also a member of the Amtsakhara Party and a member of the political council of the party. He also was elected as a MP of the 7th Peoples Assembly of Abkhazia in the 2022 Abkhazian Parliament elections.

== Abkhazia Liberation War ==
Galust Trapizonyan served as a company commander in the Armenian Baghramyan Battalion during the 1992–1993 Abkhazian–Georgian war, where he sustained severe injuries and lost a leg in combat.
