= International response to the Beslan school siege =

The international reactions to the Beslan school siege was as follows:

== Multinational bodies ==
- United Nations - Secretary-General Kofi Annan further condemned the attack as a "brutal and senseless slaughter of children" and "terrorism, pure and simple".
- (United Nations) UN Security Council – The UN Security Council in a Presidential Statement condemned the attack in the strongest terms and urged states actively to cooperate with the Russian authorities in efforts to bring the perpetrators to justice.
- European Union – Romano Prodi on behalf of the European Commission responded by calling the attack a: "Killing of these innocent people is an evil, despicable act of barbarism." Dutch Foreign Minister Ben Bot stated on behalf of the European Union that "We have been confronted with a deep human tragedy [...] Beslan shows once again that we have to do everything in our power to confront terrorism."
- UNESCO - Director-General Koichiro Matsuura of UNESCO concluded that “I am appalled that a school and its pupils are being used for political ends" and further that “Schools are where children learn to live together. The safety of schools must never be threatened. I condemn these actions in the strongest possible terms."

== Countries ==
At least the following countries has expressed their concern:

- Canada - Paul Martin voiced his support for Russia's anti-terrorism operations. During a 2004 summit with Russian authorities in Moscow, the Canadian Prime Minister announced that he "strongly condemns [...] the brutal terrorist assault on Beslan's innocent children," expressing condolence to the families of the victims.
- Denmark - Danish prime minister Anders Fogh Rasmussen said that no aim or situation could justify taking children hostage.
- France - The French Foreign Ministry, in a statement concluded that "Everyone must mobilize in the fight against terrorism."
- Germany - German chancellor Gerhard Schröder stated "This is a new dimension of terrorism" and German foreign minister Joschka Fischer said that "There are no reasons imaginable that could justify taking children, toddlers, babies and their mothers hostages."
- Israel - The Israeli government offered help in rehabilitating freed hostages. Immediately after, an experienced Israeli trauma team was sent to Beslan and later Russian psychologists working with the victims of the massacre received help on training by Israeli experts in Israel.
- Italy - The Italian prime minister Silvio Berlusconi responded saying ""The international community has to unite against terrorism that denies common human values to all the world's civilizations [...] There is no reason that could justify such inhuman violence."
- Jordan - Government spokesman Asma Khader "condemns such acts, especially the kidnapping of civilians and to scare them in such a heinous way, even more, when most are children" saying "no cause can be achieved by such criminal means."
- Lebanon - Lebanese president Émile Lahoud said in Beirut "denounces all forms of terror, especially that which threatens the lives of children and innocents."
- Pakistan — Pakistan condemns brutal crimes committed by terrorists in Beslan. In separate messages directed to Russian president Vladimir Putin and the Russian premier Mikhail Fradkov, Pakistani president Pervez Musharraf and the Pakistani prime minister Shaukat Aziz expressed their confidence that those responsible for this despicable act of terrorism would be brought to justice soon. A message relayed to Russian president, Pakistani president and prime minister expressed "their heartfelt condolences on behalf of the government and people of Pakistan and on their own behalf to the government, the people of Russia and to the bereaved families".
- South Africa - Nelson Mandela called the attack an "inhumane and barbaric act of terrorism”, saying that "in no way can the victimisation and killing of innocent children be justified in any circumstances, and especially not for political reasons."
- United States - President Bush of the United States in a speech to the UN General Assembly said of the terrorists at Beslan that they: "measure their success - in the death of the innocent, and in the pain of grieving families." And further in a later speech called it "the terrorist massacre of schoolchildren in Beslan."
- Sweden - Prime Minister of Sweden Göran Persson commented that "The evil deed of targeting children makes the world understand what times we are living in, how vulnerable our communities are and what types of crimes and terror we have to deal with."

== Religious leaders ==
- Holy See - At the Vatican City, Pope John Paul II condemned the attack as a "vile and ruthless aggression on defenceless children and families."
- Egypt - Grand Shaikh Muhammad Sayyid Tantawy, Egypt's top cleric asked: "What is the guilt of those children? Why should they be responsible for your conflict with the government? You are taking Islam as a cover and it is a deceptive cover; those who carry out the kidnappings are criminals, not Muslims."

== Non-governmental organizations ==
- A group of international human rights organizations, including Amnesty International, condemned it as an “abhorrent [...] action” and a “displays [of] callous disregard for civilian life" and further that it was “an attack on the most fundamental right - the right to life; our organizations denounce this act unreservedly."

== See also ==
- International reaction to the Peshawar school crises, 2014.
