= 2024 Parliament of Abkhazia shooting =

- Location: 43.0007906°N 41.0280789°E; People's Assembly of Abkhazia, Sukhumi, Abkhazia, Georgia
- Date: 19 December 2024
- Attack type: Shooting
- Weapon: Pistol
- Deaths: 1
- Injuries: 1
- Accused: Adgur Kharazia

On the morning of 19 December 2024, Adgur Kharazia, MP and former mayor of the Abkhazian capital of Sukhumi, allegedly opened fire on his political rivals inside the People's Assembly of Abkhazia, killing lawmaker Vakhtang Golandzia and injuring another, Kan Kvarchia, before fleeing the scene.

== Background ==
Kharazia was detained in 2020, suspected of injuring an administrative official. Electricity shortages in Abkhazia have been exacerbated by cryptocurrency mining, the cut of financial aid from Russia, and low water levels forcing an emergency shutdown at the Enguri Dam. In November, mass protests caused after the arrest of five opposition activists who are against an investment agreement with Russia begin and led to Abkhaz President Aslan Bzhania's resignation.

== Shooting ==
According to the Interior Ministry, on the day of the shooting, the People's Assembly was debating a bill on whether to ban cryptocurrency mining in Abkhazia, which led to an argument between Kharazia and Kvarchia. Kharazia argued for a ban, while Kvarchia opposed, saying such a move would be bowing to populism. Golandzia attempted to mediate the situation, but Kharazia fatally shot Golandzia in the head. A short time later, Kharazia injured Kvarchia's arm and fled the scene.

== Aftermath ==
Acting president Badra Gunba called a meeting of the Security Council and visited the Republican Hospital.

== See also ==
- Homicide at the Brazilian Senate, a similar incident occurred inside the Federal Senate, the upper house of the National Congress of Brazil
- Legislative violence
