= People's Front of Abkhazia for Development and Justice =

- Leader: Lasha Sakania; Beslan Kamkia; Suren Roganyan; Manana Kvitsinia; Ilya Shadania
- Founded: 24 September 2015
- Colours: yellow, green

The People's Front of Abkhazia for Development and Justice (Russian: Народный Фронт Абхазии за Справедливость и Развитие) is a political party in Abkhazia.

== Foundation ==
The People's Front of Abkhazia for Development and Justice held its founding congress on 24 September 2015 in Sukhumi, in which Lasha Sakania, Beslan Kamkia, Suren Roganyan and Manana Kvitsinia were elected its co-chairmen and a political council of fifteen people was established. At the time of its foundation, the People's Front had 1057 members, most of which were aged between 24 and 30.

After the Ministry for Justice found flaws in the founding documents, the party held a second founding congress on 20 January 2016, attended by 65 delegates. The four co-chairmen were re-elected, along with Ilya Shadania.
