= The Armenian community of Abkhazia =

The Armenian community of Abkhazia Армянская Община Республики Абхазия Аԥсны Ахәынҭкарра Аерманцәа Реидгыла Աբխազիայի Հանրապետության Հայկական Համայնք
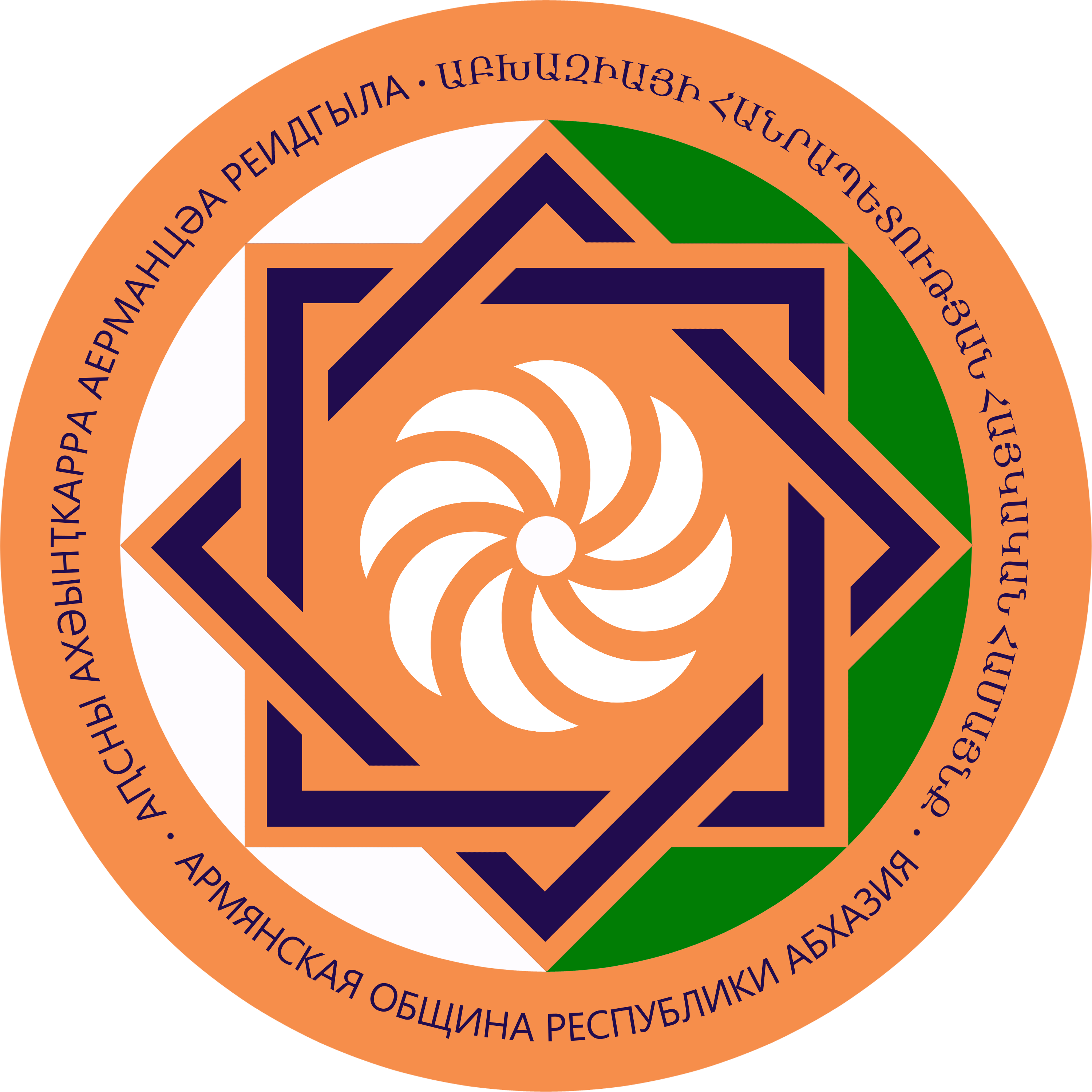
- Chairperson: Alik Minasyan
- Registered: April 15 2004
- Headquarters: 109 Lakoba Street; Sukhumi, Abkhazia
- Ideology: Armenian interests Minority politics

The Armenian community of Abkhazia (Armenian: Աբխազիայի Հանրապետության Հայկական Համայնք Abkhazian: Аԥсны Ахәынҭкарра Аерманцәа Реидгыла Russian: Армянская Община Республики Абхазия) is a public organization that represents the Armenian minority in Abkhazia. It advocates for language and minority rights, provides financial support and educational resources to Armenian schools, churches and offers assistance to low-income families.

The organization, named the Armenian Community of the Republic of Abkhazia, was established in 2004 through the merger of the Armenian Cultural Center, the Armenian charity organization "Krunk", and the Gagra-based society "Mashtots". The conference approved its charter with a governing body of three co-chairmen: Marietta Topchyan, Khachik Minosyan and Galust Trapizonian.

At a meeting on October 9, 2011, the organization changed its name to "Armenian Union of Abkhazia" (Armenian: Աբխազիայի հայերի միություն, Russian: Союз армян Абхазии). The community helped to open the Cathedral of Christ the Saviour in Gagra. At that meeting, Khachik Minosyan was elected president of the union for a 5-year term, replacing Suren Kerselyan who was elected a year prior. In 2017 it was named back to its former name and the term limit of chairmanship back from five to three years.

During the Second Nagorno-Karabakh War, the community provided humanitarian aid to affected civilians.

The Armenian community of Abkhazia appealed to the government of Armenia through the Commissioner of Diaspora Affairs Zareh Sinanyan, with a request to the authorities with a demand for protective measures to protect the Armenian minority, believing that the local political opposition of Adgur Ardzinba, allegedly has close ties with radical Turkish nationalists and the Turkish secret services. The authors of the appeal expressed concerns about possible violence.

== Leadership ==
- Garegin Kazaryan (2007-2010)
- Suren Kerselyan (2010-2011)
- Khachik Minosyan (2011-2017)
- Galust Trapizonyan (2017-2023)
- Alik Minasyan (2023-present)

== See also ==
- Armenians in Abkhazia
- Machara
