= Timeline of the Beslan school siege =

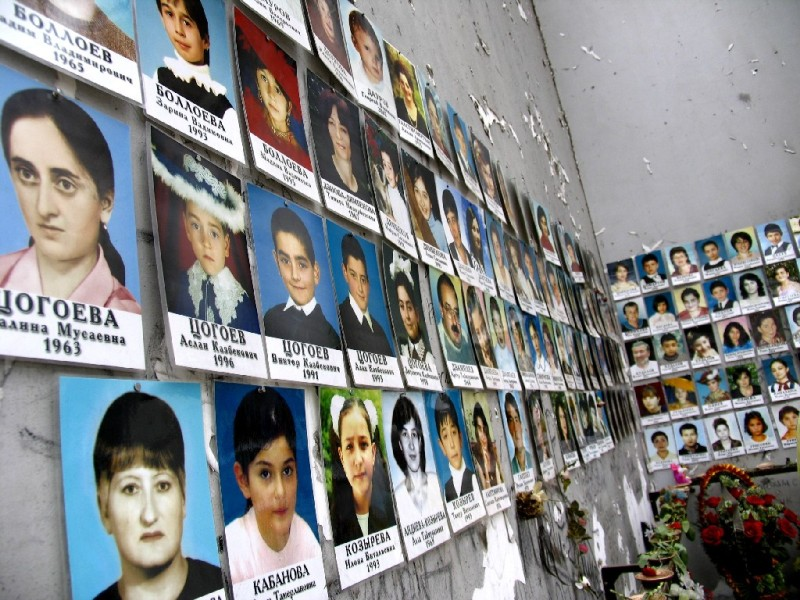
Photos of victims of the siege

The Beslan school hostage crisis (also referred to as the Beslan school siege or Beslan Massacre) began when armed Chechen terrorists took more than 1200 school children and adults hostage on 1 September 2004, at School Number One (SNO) in the Russian town of Beslan in North Ossetia.

== Timeline ==
All times in local Moscow Time Zone, UTC+3.

=== Wednesday, September 1, 2004 ===
- 9:00 AM: Day of Knowledge, festivities mark the beginning of the school year when new pupils are welcomed.
- 9:30 AM: School stormed by 32 heavily armed males, as well as two females wearing suicide bomb belts. During the initial confusion about 50 people manage to escape and raise the alarm. About 1,200 are taken hostage in the school gym. Eight people are killed during the storming. Ten male hostages are killed immediately afterwards.
- 10:00 AM: Attackers start mining the gym and other school buildings using improvised explosive devices packed with nuts, bolts and nails. Inside the gym the hostages are surrounded with tripwires and explosives are strung up over the hostages for maximum personnel damage. Hostage Ruslan Betrozov is shot after translating the directions the terrorists gave into Ossetian, the local language of Beslan.
- 10:20 AM: President Vladimir Putin cancels his vacation in Sochi and returns to Moscow.
- 10:26 AM: News agencies mistakenly state that two schools have been seized. Half an hour later it is corrected to only one school.
- 11:10 AM: Officials state that there are between 200–400 hostages and 15–20 terrorists.
- 11:15 AM: Hostage-takers force hostage children to stand exposed in the windows, acting as human shields.
- 11:30 AM: President of North Ossetia Alexander Dzasokhov arrives at SNO.
- 11:34 AM: North Ossetian borders are closed, and all flights to capital Vladikavkaz are cancelled. The military is ordered to protect kindergartens, schools, and other public buildings of North Ossetia.
- 11:50 AM: In a message delivered by a released hostage, the attackers threaten to kill 10 hostages if electricity or communication is cut, 20 hostages for every one of them wounded, 50 hostages for every one of them killed, and to kill everybody if 5 attackers are killed. They also demand to negotiate with politicians Alexander Dzasokhov and Murat Zyazikov and noted pediatrician Leonid Roshal (later it turned out that an error had occurred and the terrorists demanded another political figure, Vladimir Rushailo instead of Roshal).
- 1:00 PM: Hostage-takers drop a note from one of the windows demanding that Russian forces withdraw from Chechnya.
- 1:25 PM: Hostage-takers refuse offer to exchange hostage children for high-ranking Ossetian officials.
- Afternoon: Russian commandos ("Spetsnaz") arrive and take up positions around the school.
- 3:00 PM : The two female hostage-takers detonate themselves or are detonated by their leader.
- 4:40 PM: 12 children and one adult escape after hiding in a nearby boiler room within the school.
- Evening: Russian leaders call for an emergency session of the UN security council.
- 7:30 PM: Authorities establish contact with hostage-takers.
- 8:00 PM: Attackers tell a New York Times correspondent that they belong to a militant organization called Riyadh al-Salihin, led by Chechen warlord Shamil Basayev.
- 8:31 PM: Hostage-takers refused an offer of a shipment of water and medicine for the hostages.
- 9:30 PM: Leonid Roshal arrives in Beslan and starts to negotiate with hostage-takers.
- 11:00 PM: Roshal negotiates for two hours with hostage-takers. He offers them safe departure to Ingushetia and Chechnya and to replace the hostage children with adults. Both offers are refused, as well as water and medicine. Negotiations end, no agreement is reached.

=== Thursday September 2, 2004 ===
- Night: The UN Security Council votes to condemn the hostage taking.
- Early morning: After negotiations throughout the night have failed to reach an agreement, the hostage takers decided to deny the already exhausted hostages all food or water.
- Morning: President Vladimir Putin postpones a state visit to Turkey.
- 10:00 AM: Ruslan Aushev enters school and negotiates face to face with terrorists.
- 10:00 AM: Roshal renews negotiations with hostage-takers. They are given a guarantee of safe passage out of North Ossetia as well as large sums of money. Hostage-takers reject both offers.
- 11:00 AM: Putin addresses the nation for the first time since the crisis began, saying his main concern is the lives and health of the hostages.
- 12:00 PM: Russian Interior Minister Rashid Nurgaliyev and head of FSB Nikolai Patrushev arrive in Beslan to set up a crisis team.
- 12:40 PM: Ruslan Aushev fails to come to an agreement with the hostage-takers, but manage to convince them to release nursing babies and their mothers, 26 in all.
- 3:30 PM: Two rocket propelled grenades are fired by hostage-takers at the security forces outside the school.
- 8:00 PM: Officials revise their estimates of the number of hostages from around 350 to more than 1000.
- 9:00 PM: Ongoing negotiation with hostage-takers continue throughout the night to allow delivery of food and water and medicine to the hostages.

=== Friday September 3, 2004 ===
- 12:50 PM: Attackers agree to let medical workers retrieve the bodies of previously killed hostages dumped outside the school buildings. Two trucks approach to pick up the bodies.
- 12:59 PM: Medical workers approaching the school building are fired at by the terrorists.
- 1:05 PM: Two of the explosives in the gym detonate, blowing out the windows and partially destroying one wall. Many hostages die outright, many others are wounded. Other hostages take it as a signal to flee. Terrorists fire on fleeing women and children. About 30 hostages escape alive.
- 1:10 PM: Russian special forces move in.
- 1:30 PM: Gym roof collapses, crushing many hostages in the rubble underneath. Ambulances ferry escaped hostages to a nearby makeshift military hospital.
- 1:40 PM: Russian special forces surge into the school gym.
- 1:45 PM: A group of attackers flee the school. They are then pursued by Russian forces.
- 2:00 PM: More hostages are freed from the gym by Russian forces which are combing the buildings.
- 2:05 PM: Russian forces report they have most of the school under control.
- 2:15 PM: Five attackers killed.
- 2:28 PM: Paramedics enter gym.
- 2:30 PM: Group of hostage-takers make a stand in the school cafeteria using women and children as human shields.
- 2:40 PM: Russian forces blow holes in school walls to allow more hostages to escape.
- 3:15 PM: Most of the hostages freed. More than 100 bodies found in the school, mostly in the gym where the initial explosions took place and the roof collapsed.
- 3:25 PM: A group of about 13 escaped terrorists holed up in local home south of the school. They are surrounded by Russian forces and destroyed by a group of T-72 tanks.
- 3:55 PM: Three attackers are trapped in the school basement with a number of hostages they use as human shields.
- 5:30 PM: Russian forces report the assault on the school was unplanned.
- 5:35 PM: One hostage-taker, Nur-Pashi Kulayev, tried to pass himself off as a wounded hostage before being recognised and nearly lynched by an enraged mob.
- 6:50 PM: Fighting ends in basement. All terrorists killed.
- 8:15 PM: School crisis coordination centre reports all the attackers have been suppressed.
- 9:00 PM: 646 people reported admitted to hospitals, amongst them 227 children.
- 9:20 PM: Confirmed deaths rise above 200. 79 identified.
- 9:50 PM: Sporadic fighting continues despite reports that all attackers have been destroyed. Crisis centre reports two attackers have been killed within the last hour.
- 10:08 PM: Three terrorists reported taken alive.
- 11:00 PM: Russian officials count 31 killed hostage-takers.

=== Saturday September 4, 2004 ===
- 3:15 AM: Putin orders Beslan sealed and the borders of North Ossetia closed as security forces continue to search for participants in the school massacre.
- 4:00 AM: Putin flies to Beslan and visits local hospitals.
- 8:00 AM: Putin confirms the storm on the school was not planned.
- 9:54 AM: Six heavily injured children are flown to Moscow for specialist treatment.
- 11:00 AM: Official numbers of deaths now tops 322 including 155 children.
- 3:30 PM: Putin, in a televised speech to the nation, admits to deficiencies in handling of the hostage crisis, saying “Weak people are beaten.”
- 6:00 PM: Beslan residents are allowed into the destroyed school.

=== Sunday September 5, 2004 ===
- Official death toll now at 355, 207 identified. 700 injured. 386 hospitalized, 58 in critical condition.
- First of the funerals take place.
- Russian patriarch Alexius II presides over a mass in Moscow to pray for the victims of the tragedy.

=== Monday September 6, 2004 ===
- Mass burials of up to 120 victims.
- Putin orders two days of national mourning. Ceremonies held in all larger cities.

=== Tuesday September 7, 2004 ===
- Mass rally in at Kremlin in Moscow gathers around 135,000 people in a demonstration against terrorism.

=== Friday, September 17, 2004 ===
- In a message to the website Kavkaz Center, Chechen leader Basayev claimed responsibility for the school siege.

=== Monday, October 11, 2004 ===
- Ceremony in Beslan to mark the end of the traditional 40 days of mourning.

=== Wednesday, February 16, 2005 ===
- Abu Zaid Al-Kuwaiti, suspected of preparing and organizing attack against Beslan, commits suicide when surrounded by Russian special forces.

=== November 2005 ===
- Abu Omar al-Saif, suspected financier and organiser of attack against Beslan, commits suicide or is killed when surrounded by Russian special forces.

=== Friday, May 26, 2006 ===
- Nur-Pashi Kulayev, the only known terrorist to survive the hostage taking is sentenced to life in prison.

=== Monday, July 10, 2006 ===
- Basayev is killed in the Russian republic of Ingushetia after a "special operation", according to FSB security service chief Patrushev.

== See also ==
- Beslan school hostage crisis
