= Vagharshak Kosyan =

Armenian-Abkhazian military leader and politician

Vagharshak Kosyan Վաղարշակ Կօսեան

Vice Speaker of the People's Assembly of Abkhazia

Personal details

Military service
- Allegiance: Abkhazia
- Branch/service: Bagramyan Battalion
- Years of service: 1991–1994
- Rank: Lieutenant
- Commands: Bagramyan Battalion
- Battles/wars: War in Abkhazia: 2nd Sukhum

Vagharshak Kosyan (Hamshen Armenian: Վաղարշակ Կօսեան) is an Armenian-Abkhazian military leader and politician. During the War in Abkhazia, he was commander of the Bagramyan Battalion. Kosyan was awarded the Hero of Abkhazia title, the highest state award of Abkhazia, for his services. He is a former Deputy Speaker of the People's Assembly of Abkhazia.

== Biography ==
His family originally came from Ordu (ancient Kotyora), on what is now the Turkish Black Sea coast, and took refuge in Abkhazia during the Armenian genocide. He was the first secretary of the Gagra Komsomol during the Soviet period. During the War in Abkhazia, Kosyan organized the creation of the Armenian motorized infantry Bagramyan Battalion within the Abkhaz separatist army. He was praised for combat effectiveness by Abkhazian President Vladislav Ardzinba. For his services, Kosyan was awarded the Hero of Abkhazia, Order of Leon, and Medal "For Courage" honors.

After the war he worked in economics. Kosyan was thrice elected deputy of the Gagra District Assembly and is a former Deputy Speaker of the People's Assembly of Abkhazia.

== Honors ==
- Hero of Abkhazia
- Order of Leon
- Medal "For Courage"
