= 2012 Abkhazian parliamentary election =

- 10 March 2012; 24 March 2012
- All 35 seats in the People's Assembly; 18 seats needed for a majority
- Turnout: 44.5%
Party	Leader	Seats	+/–
Independents / Initiative Groups		35	0
This lists parties that won seats. See the complete results below.

Parliamentary elections were held in Abkhazia on 10 March 2012, with a second round on 24 March. Voters elected the fifth convocation of the People's Assembly.

== Background ==
This was the first parliamentary election since the August 2008 war and the subsequent diplomatic recognition of Abkhazia by Russia, Nicaragua, Nauru, Venezuela, Vanuatu and Tuvalu.

On 22 February, President Alexander Ankvab survived an assassination attempt as his motorcade came under attack on the road from Gudauta to Sukhumi. Though he survived, two bodyguards were killed. Ankvab blamed "mafia, criminal groups" and the "political circles" around them for the attack. The Russian Foreign Ministry said that it was an attempt to destabilise the country's political situation prior to the election.

== Parties ==
Candidates could be nominated by initiative groups and by officially registered political parties (in at most a third of all constituencies, that is 11).

=== Candidates ===
In total, 156 candidates were nominated. 35 candidates were nominated by a political party and 126 by an initiative group (with some overlap). Of the candidates nominated by a political party, 11 were nominated by United Abkhazia, 11 by the Forum for the National Unity of Abkhazia, 7 by the Communist Party and 6 by the Party for the Economic Development of Abkhazia. The Central Electoral Commission approved the registration of 151 candidates. Of these, 3 withdrew their candidacy before election day. Of the remaining 148 candidates, 125 were ethnically Abkhaz, nine Armenian, eight Russian, two Greek, two Georgian, one Ossetian and one Kabardin. 16 were female.

== Campaign ==
On 6 March, the Russian Community of the Republic of Abkhazia called upon voters in constituencies 7, 11 and 23 to vote for the Russian candidates Natalya Kayun, Andrei Kulikov and Viktor Vasilev, the first two of which had previously been nominated by United Abkhazia.

== Monitors ==
There were 46-100 international observers from nine countries. According to the CEC, the monitors would be from Russia (from governmental and non-governmental organisations), the Commonwealth of Independent States, South Ossetia, Transnistria and Nagorno-Karabakh. Other states whose monitors were invited but had not confirmed attendance are: Venezuela, Nicaragua, Nauru and Tuvalu. Georgia steadfastly refused to observe the election on the premise that they claim Abkhazia is under "de facto Russian occupation" and that Georgian refugees who fled Abkhazia (by some accounts up to 50% of the population) are ineligible to vote.

== Results ==
There were 174 pollings stations. First round turnout was 44.5%. Only 13 constituencies achieved a majority to choose an MP; the other 22 constituencies would face a run-off.

Second round turnout was 46.21% in 20 constituencies. Of the 40 candidates for the 20 seats in the second round three of nine incumbents held on to their seats. Amongst the 20 members were three MPs from People’s Unity Forum of Abkhazia, two from United Abkhazia the 15 from civic initiative groups. The result will be finalised when approved by a court. Amongst minority representatives, Vagharshak Kosyan and Robert Yalyan were joined by journalist Levon Galustyan to have a total of three Armenian MPs, according to Khachik Minosyan, the Chairman of the Union of Abkhazia Armenians. Galustyan said the election was flawless and praised his fellow Armenian challenger from district 20.

The following table presents an overview of all the candidates, the votes they received in the first round, the second round run-off winners and the reruns.

Constituency	Candidate	Party	First round		Second round		Notes
Constituency	Candidate	Party	Votes	%	Votes	%	Notes
1	Roland Gamgia	Independent	648	35.14			Election annulled
1	Talikh Khvatish	United Abkhazia	454	24.62			Election annulled
1	Daur Achugba	Independent	338	18.33			Election annulled
1	Aidar Kvitsinia	Independent	195	10.57			Election annulled
1	Yekaterina Glazkova	Party for the Economic Development of Abkhazia	115	6.24			Election annulled
1	Eduard Keshanidi	Independent	60	3.25			Election annulled
1	Pavel Bganba	Independent	34	1.84			Election annulled
2	Aslan Kobakhia	Forum for the National Unity of Abkhazia	746	27.09	No data		Elected
2	Akhra Abukhba	Independent	547	19.86	No data		
2	Fazylbei Avidzba	Independent	458	16.63			
2	Vakhtang Pipia	United Abkhazia	451	16.38			
2	Temur Tabagua	Independent	301	10.93			
2	Akhra Aristava	Independent	153	5.56			
2	Dmitri Shlarba	Independent	98	3.56			
3	Beslan Tsvinaria	Independent	488	25.40	No data		Elected
3	Rita Lolua	Forum for the National Unity of Abkhazia	424	22.07	No data		Unseated
3	Satbei Kvitsinia	Independent	328	17.07			
3	Vianor Tuzhba	Independent	176	9.16			
3	Ilia Gamisonia	Independent	126	6.56			
3	Mukhamed Bli	Independent	90	4.69			
3	Sergei Arshba	Independent	86	4.48			
3	Arkadi Jinjia	Independent	85	4.42			
3	Anatoli Pilia	Communist Party of Abkhazia	74	3.85			
3	Irina Mikvabia	Independent	44	2.29			
4	Amiran Lagvilava	Independent	502	25.34	No data		
4	Valeri Agrba	Independent	393	19.84	No data		Elected
4	Vianor Ashba	Independent	350	17.67			
4	Lasha Sakania	Independent	263	13.28			
4	Batal Kobakhia	Independent	176	8.88			Unseated
4	Leila Tania	Independent	164	8.28			
4	Ivan Tarba	Independent	133	6.71			
5	Akhra Bzhania	Forum for the National Unity of Abkhazia	866	43.08	No data		Elected
5	Valeri Ardzinba	Independent	469	23.33	No data		
5	Iakub Lakoba	Independent	222	11.04			
5	Daur Tarba	United Abkhazia	193	9.60			
5	Andrei Tuzhba	Communist Party of Abkhazia	136	6.77			
5	Mzia Beia	Independent	124	6.17			
6	Artur Mikvabia	Independent	635	31.31	No data		Elected
6	Irina Agrba	Independent	574	28.30	No data		Unseated
6	Astamur Adleiba	Independent	552	27.22			
6	Nadir Bitiev	Independent	185	9.12			
6	Marina Gumba	Independent	82	4.04			
7	Zaur Iazychba	Independent	706	44.60	No data		Elected
7	Ruslan Kharabua	Forum for the National Unity of Abkhazia	395	24.95	No data		
7	Astamur Kakalia	Independent	224	14.15			
7	David Chagava	Independent	115	7.26			
7	Natalia Kaiun	United Abkhazia	79	4.99			
7	Pavel Leshchuk	Independent	64	4.04			Unseated
8	Beslan Gubaz	Independent	883	40.71	No data		Elected
8	Dona Malia	Independent	613	28.26	No data		
8	Almasbei Kchach	Party for the Economic Development of Abkhazia	556	25.63			
8	Stanislav Aiba	Independent	117	5.39			
9	Valeri Bganba	Independent	1,029	54.59			Reelected
9	Astan Agrba	Independent	856	45.41			
10	Anzor Kokoskeria	Independent	815	41.20	No data		Elected
10	Tamaz Khetsia	United Abkhazia	636	32.15	No data		
10	Nodari Kvitsinia	Independent	368	18.60			
10	Shota Bagatelia	Communist Party of Abkhazia	159	8.04			
11	Beslan Bartsits	Independent	566	22.18	No data		Elected
11	Vitali Azhiba	Independent	553	21.67	No data		
11	Gennadi Sichinava	Independent	517	20.26			
11	Vadim Smyr	Independent	471	18.46			
11	Aleksei Romanenko	Independent	141	5.53			
11	Andrei Kulikov	United Abkhazia	109	4.27			
11	Renad Benia	Independent	98	3.84			
11	Tatiana Pavlova	Communist Party of Abkhazia	52	2.04			
11	Leonti Bazba	Independent	45	1.76			
12	Vagarshak Kosyan	Independent	1,276	60.50			Elected
12	Valeri Mayromyan	Independent	726	34.42			Unseated
12	Aram Kosyan	Independent	107	5.07			
13	Georgi Agrba	Independent	611	39.42	No data		Elected
13	Astamur Aiba	Independent	477	30.77	No data		
13	Kherson Dashelia	Independent	357	23.03			
13	Valeri Bartsyts	Communist Party of Abkhazia	88	5.68			
13	Beslan Dbar	Independent	17	1.10			
14	Guram Barganjia	United Abkhazia	912	56.51			Elected
14	Aleksei Tania	Independent	702	43.49			
15	Mikhail Sangulia	Independent	865	48.06	No data		Reelected
15	Aslan Lakoba	Independent	637	35.39	No data		
15	Remzik Chirikbaia	Forum for the National Unity of Abkhazia	298	16.56			
16	Zaur Avidzba	Independent	867	34.72	No data		
16	Leonid Chamagua	Independent	666	26.67	No data		Elected
16	Anri Jergenia	Independent	555	22.23			
16	Viacheslav Ardzinba	Independent	409	16.38			
17	Dmitri Gunba	United Abkhazia	1,010	49.95	No data		Elected
17	Givi Gabnia	Party for the Economic Development of Abkhazia	788	38.97	No data		
17	Lev Shamba	Communist Party of Abkhazia	224	11.08			Unseated
18	Akhra Pachulia	Independent	799	52.84			Elected
18	Vitali Smyr	Independent	713	47.16			Unseated
19	Fazlibei Avidzba	Independent	620	58.33			Elected
19	Zhuzhuna Bigvava	Independent	443	41.67			
20	Galust Trapizonyan	Independent	654	42.08	No data		
20	Levon Galustyan	Independent	651	41.89	No data		Elected
20	Farat Mikaelyan	United Abkhazia	136	8.75			
20	Valeri Bganba	Independent	113	7.27			
21	Aida Ashuba	Independent	—	—			Election annulled
21	Valeri Kvarchia	Independent	—	—			Election annulled
21	Diana Pilia	Independent	—	—			Election annulled
21	Dmitri Sevastidi	Independent	—	—			Election annulled
22	Robert Yaylyan	Independent	711	52.55			Elected
22	Sergei Matosyan	Independent	360	26.61			Unseated
22	Albert Kapikyan	Independent	282	20.84			
23	Said Kharazia	Independent	1,041	51.51			Elected
23	Aleksandr Studenikin	Forum for the National Unity of Abkhazia	379	18.75			
23	David Gabnia	Independent	307	15.19			
23	Viktor Vasilev	Independent	294	14.55			Unseated
24	Adgur Kharazia	Independent	528	37.90	No data		Reelected
24	Aleksei Lataria	Independent	504	36.18	No data		
24	Ziulfi Achuzba	Forum for the National Unity of Abkhazia	361	25.92			
25	Daur Arshba	Forum for the National Unity of Abkhazia	778	36.92	No data		Unseated. From district Nº 30
25	Yuri Zukhba	Independent	743	35.26	No data		Reelected
25	Zaur Zarandia	United Abkhazia	586	27.81			
26	Temur Logua	Independent	839	47.11	No data		Elected
26	Khrips Jopua	Independent	475	26.67	No data		
26	Daur Tsvizhba	Independent	289	16.23			
26	Zaur Adleiba	Independent	178	9.99			Unseated
27	Nugzar Ashuba	Independent	449	29.16	No data		Unseated
27	Appolon Gurgulia	Forum for the National Unity of Abkhazia	384	24.94	No data		Elected
27	Almas Kvaratskhelia	Independent	382	24.81			
27	Ramiz Tabagua	Independent	276	17.92			
27	Klara Sakania	Independent	49	3.18			
28	Temur Kvitsinia	Independent	737	55.46			Reelected
28	Adgur Kakoba	Independent	236	17.76			
28	Tamaz Gogia	Independent	205	15.43			
28	Andrei Anua	Independent	151	11.36			
29	Otar Tsvizhba	Independent	1,631	68.70			Elected
29	Grigori Latsuzhba	Independent	520	21.90			
29	Aleksandr Adleiba	Independent	223	9.39			
30	Raul Khajimba	Forum for the National Unity of Abkhazia	1,311	74.74			Elected
30	Daur Ferizba	Independent	331	18.87			
30	Anzor Argun	Party for the Economic Development of Abkhazia	112	6.39			
31	Kan Kvarchia	Independent	457	42.28	No data		Elected
31	Aleksandr Chengelia	Independent	271	25.07	No data		Unseated
31	Alkhaz Manargia	Independent	242	22.39			
31	Tengiz Malandzia	Independent	111	10.27			
32	Emma Gamisonia	Independent	1,621	67.68			Reelected
32	Irakli Bzhinava	Independent	412	17.20			
32	Vadim Kvachakhia	Independent	174	7.27			
32	Beslan Bagatelia	Independent	157	6.56			
32	Joni Gularia	Independent	31	1.29			
33	Akhra Kvekveskiri	United Abkhazia	808	47.47	No data		Elected
33	Ruslan Kishmaria	Independent	520	30.55	No data		
33	Avtandil Chkadua	Independent	374	21.97			
34	Nodik Kvitsinia	Independent	1,050	62.09			Elected
34	Sergei Berulava	Forum for the National Unity of Abkhazia	379	22.41			
34	Ameran Akhsalba	Party for the Economic Development of Abkhazia	262	15.49			
35	Bezhan Ubiria	Independent	1,105	74.76			Reelected
35	Nato Butbaia	Party for the Economic Development of Abkhazia	373	25.24			

== Aftermath ==
=== Rerun in constituency no. 1 ===
The first round of the election in constituency no. 1 was declared invalid because the turnout had failed to surpass the threshold of 25%. On election day, the Constituency Election Commission originally declared that turnout had been 25.01%. However, after a complaint by two candidates that a mistake had been made in the calculation of the turnout, the Central Election Commission ordered the Constituency Election Commission to recheck the protocols. The corrected turnout was found to be 24.9%, invalidating the election.

On 19 March the Central Election Commission announced that the rerun would be held on 6 May. Four out of seven of the original candidates were nominated again: Daur Achugba, Roland Gamgia, Yekaterina Glazkova and Talikh Khvatish. They were joined by one new candidate, businessman Beslan Eshba. All were successfully registered. Eshba won the rerun with 1932 out of 3413 votes (56.61%), against 782 for Gamgia, 520 for Khvatysh, 47 for Achugba and 43 for Glazkova. Turnout was significantly higher than during the original election, at 44.94%.

Candidate	Party	Votes	%
Beslan Eshba	Independent	1,932	58.12
Roland Gamgia	Independent	782	23.53
Talikh Khvatish	Independent	520	15.64
Daur Achugba	Independent	47	1.41
Yekaterina Glazkova	Independent	43	1.29
Total		3,324	100.00
Valid votes		3,324	97.39
Invalid/blank votes		89	2.61
Total votes		3,413	100.00
Registered voters/turnout			44.94%

=== Rerun in constituency no. 21 ===
On 29 March, the Supreme Court of Abkhazia invalidated the election in constituency no. 21 and ordered a rerun. The original count had given Aida Ashuba a slim first round majority of 401 votes out of 795 (50.44%), but after a complaint by the campaign team of runner up Valeri Kvarchia, the election commission of precinct 1 held a recount. In the recount, 46 more ballots were found to be invalid, causing Ashuba's vote share to fall below 50% and making a second round run-off between Ashuba and Kvarchia necessary. Ashuba then issued a complaint with the Central Election Commission as his observers had not been present during the recount. The Central Election Commission agreed with the complaint and requested the precinct and constituency election commissions to uphold the original count. When the local election commission refused to comply, the Central Election Commission brought the matter to the Supreme Court.

During the court proceedings it was established that contrary to election law, the ballot bag had not been sealed, and that during the recount, supporters of Kvarchia as well as Security Council and Interior Ministry officials had been present. The representative of the office of the Procecutor General argued that this constituted a breach of election law, that the irregularities in the transport and storage of election ballots meant that determining the correct election result was now impossible, and that both voting protocols should be declared invalid.

The repeat election was set for 20 May, with the nomination period running from 31 March to 20 April and the registration period from 20 April to 10 May. Both Aida Ashuba and Valeri Kvarchia were nominated again by initiative groups. They were joined by Givi Adleiba, who had not originally participated. All three candidates were successfully registered. The rerun saw a much higher turnout than the original election of 1271 from a total of 1770 registered voters (71.8%). No candidate managed to score a first round victory in the repeat election as Kvarchia received 573 votes, Ashuba 502 and Adleiba 159 (37 votes being invalid). In the second round on 4 June, Kvarchia defeated Ashuba with 679 votes against 623, out of a total of 1334 — there had been 1779 registered voters.

Candidate	Party	First round		Second round	
Candidate	Party	Votes	%	Votes	%
Valeri Kvarchia	Independent	573	46.43	679	52.15
Aida Ashuba	Independent	502	40.68	623	47.85
Givi Adleiba	Independent	159	12.88		
Total		1,234	100.00	1,302	100.00
Valid votes		1,234	97.09	1,302	97.60
Invalid/blank votes		37	2.91	32	2.40
Total votes		1,271	100.00	1,334	100.00
Registered voters/turnout		1,770	71.81	1,779	74.99

== Reactions ==
The head of the Central Election Commission, Batal Tabagua, said that since voter turnout exceeded the 25% threshold the election was declared valid. He also added the election was "calm and normal." The CEC spokesman added that "there weren’t observed any violations that could affect the people’s free will." The Ministry of Foreign Affairs responded to claims of the election being "illegitimate" by NATO, the U.S. Department of State and its embassy in Georgia, the EU delegation to Georgia, PACE co-reporters on Georgia and the Foreign Ministries of Georgia, Latvia, Lithuania, Estonia, Poland and Azerbaijan as them having "not see[n] fit to support their conclusions by any legal or factual evidence. Such conclusions could have been made only from direct observation of preparation and conduct of voting in the elections to the People's Assembly of the Republic of Abkhazia. However, none of the above-mentioned countries and organisations sent their observers here, though the Central Election Commission of Abkhazia would have definitely provided them everything necessary for quality monitoring of the voting process." It also added that all the observers, including from the UN-member states of Russia, Venezuela, Nicaragua and Tuvalu, as well as the European parliament and international NGOs confirmed the election was in line with international democratic standards and that "people of Abkhazia recognised the legitimacy of voting procedures in their state long ago."

- Georgia - Georgia called the election "illegitimate" under their claim that Abkhazia was under Russian "occupation" after the 2008 Russia Georgia war.
  - A statement from the Tbilisi, Georgia-based government of the Autonomous Republic of Abkhazia read: "Occupied Abkhazia is not a subject under international law. Therefore, elections held there can’t be regarded in the light of international law." Levan Tevzaia, a representative of the organisation said: "The de facto parliamentary elections are under way in an occupied region of Georgia, from where the absolute majority of the population is displaced; hence, these so-called elections do not have a legal framework. It is an absolute fiction. The region is actually ruled by Russia."
- Russia - Sergei Markov, a member of the Public Chamber said that the election should give Abkhazia a legitimate parliament so as the country's problems. He added that "a democratic society is developing in Abkhazia. The republic is the most democratic state in the Caucasus and can set the pattern for Georgia."
- United States - The embassy in Georgia said it does not recognise the election.
