= Party for the Economic Development of Abkhazia =

Party for the Economic Development of Abkhazia Аԥсны аекономика арҿиара апартиа აფხაზეთის ეკონომიკური განვითარების პარტია Партия экономического развития Абхазии
- Chairman: Beslan Butba
- Deputy Chairman: Beslan Baratelia
- Founded: September 26, 2007
- Ideology: Social liberalism
- Political position: Centre
- People's Assembly: 0 / 35

The Party for the Economic Development of Abkhazia (Abkhaz: Аԥсны аекономика арҿиара апартиа; Georgian: აფხაზეთის ეკონომიკური განვითარების პარტია, romanized: apkhazetis ek'onomik'uri ganvitarebis p'art'ia; Russian: Партия экономического развития Абхазии) is an opposition party in Abkhazia led by businessman Beslan Butba.

== History ==
The Party for the Economic Development of Abkhazia (PEDA) was founded during its first congress on 26 September 2007 in Sukhumi. Businessman and former MP Beslan Butba was unanimously elected its Chairman. The Political Council consisted of Butba, Beslan Kvarchia, Georgi Basaria, Leonid Osia, Aslan Bartsyts, Irina Tkacheva, former Agriculture Minister Jamal Eshba, Irma Jgenaria, Abkhazian State University lecturers Beslan Baratelia and Batal Khagush, People's Artist Nurbei Kamkia, Ilia Gamasonia, Ekho Abkhazii journalist Vitali Sharia and Aleksandr Neproshin.

On 25 December the Party organised a roundtable discussion on the demographic situation in Abkhazia, which was attended by representatives of many other Abkhazian parties. On 30 January 2008 it signed a cooperation agreement with the People's Party of Abkhazia, one of the oldest political parties in Abkhazia. The Party financed the repair of the library in Chlou, native village of the writer Bagrat Shinkuba, which was reopened on 26 April. On 28 November 2008 it held its second congress, which was attended by around 400 delegates. During the congress chairman Beslan Butba condemned the corruption and lack of transparency of the Abkhazian government. On 23 January 2009 the Party organised a roundtable discussion about the run-up to the December 2009 Presidential election, which was attended by representatives from most other parties. On 23 October 2009 it held its fourth congress, during which Butba was nominated for President, and former Minister of the Interior Almasbei Kchach for Vice President.

At its fifth congress on 21 July 2011, party leader Butba expressed his support for Sergei Shamba in the upcoming Presidential election. On 6 February 2012, the party held its sixth congress, nominating six candidates for the upcoming Parliamentary elections, none of whom was elected.

On 27 June 2012, the party signed a cooperation agreement with the youth movement Young Abkhazia. On 10 July 2013, the Economic Development Party founded the Coordinating Council of Political Parties and Public Organisations along with fellow opposition parties United Abkhazia, the Forum for the National Unity of Abkhazia and the People's Party of Abkhazia, and a number of social movements including Young Abkhazia.

On 29 February 2016, the PEDA became a founding member of the Council for the National Unity of the Republic of Abkhazia, uniting political forces that were neither pro-government nor pro-opposition. It had initiated its creation together with United Abkhazia.
