= Alias Labakhua =

Georgian mayor

Alias Mikhailovich Labakhua Алиас Миха-иԥа Лабахәа ალიას მიხაილის ძე ლაბახუა

Mayor of Sukhumi
- In office 15 May 2007 – 22 October 2014
- President: Sergei Bagapsh; Alexander Ankvab; Valeri Bganba Acting
- Preceded by: Anzor Kortua Acting
- Succeeded by: Adgur Kharazia Acting

Personal details
- Born: 2 August 1963 (age 62) Sukhumi, Abkhazian ASSR, Georgian SSR, USSR

Alias Mikhailovich Labakhua (Abkhaz: Алиас Миха-иԥа Лабахәа, Georgian: ალიას ლაბახუა; born 2 August 1963) was Mayor of Sukhumi from 15 May 2007 until 22 October 2014

== Early life and career ==
Alias Labakhua was born in 1963 in Sukhumi. In 1980 he graduated from Sukhumi school no. 4, V. Mayakovsky. In 1985 he graduated from the Abkhazian State University in Law, having acquired the qualifications of a lawyer. From 1985 until 1987 Labakhua served with the Soviet army in East Germany. From March 1988 until April 1990, Labakhua served as assistant attorney with the procuracy of the Abkhazian ASSR in the city of Tkvarcheli. From April until August 1990 he served as assistant attorney responsible for the execution of laws on minors in the Abkhazian ASSR. From August 1990 until December 1991 Labakhua served as senior assistant Attorney in the Azov-Black Sea environmental prosecutor's office in Sukhumi.

Throughout the rest of the nineties, Labakhua fulfilled various roles within Abkhazia's customs departments.

From November 1991 until February 1992 he was customs inspector, and from February 1992 until December 1992, senior customs inspector. From December 1992 until February 1998 Labakhua was head of the operational department of the State Customs Committee of the Republic of Abkhazia. From February 1998 until June 2000 he was chief of the customs post in Psou. From June 2000 until November 2001 Labakhua was head of the unit combating Custom offences. From November 2001 until April 2003 he was inspector with the department of freight and passenger traffic, and from April until August 2003 senior inspector. From August 2003 until April 2005 Labakhua was inspector in the customs post in Sukhumi. In April 2005 Labakhua became the First Deputy Chairman of the State Customs Committee of Abkhazia.

== Mayor of Sukhumi ==
On 15 May 2007, President Sergei Bagapsh released Alias Labkhua from his post in the State Customs Committee and appointed him acting Mayor of Sukhumi, a post temporarily fulfilled by former Vice-Mayor Anzor Kortua after former mayor Astamur Adleiba had been fired on 2 May for corruption.

On 2 September, Labakhua won by-elections in constituency No. 21, which had become necessary after Adleiba relinquished his seat on 23 July. Adleiba was the only candidate and was elected with 265 votes in favour and 2 against, out of a total 789 voters registered (a turnout of 34%). Since Adleiba was now a member of the city assembly, president Bagapsh could permanently appoint him Mayor of Sukhumi on 18 September.

Following the May 2014 Revolution and the election of Raul Khajimba, Labakhua was dismissed as mayor and succeeded by Adgur Kharazia on 22 October 2014.

Preceded by Anzor Kortua (acting)	Mayor of Sukhumi; 2007–2014	Succeeded by Adgur Kharazia (acting)
