= Adgur Kharazia =

Abkhazian politician

Adgur Kharaziya
- Адгəыр Ҳаразиа ადგურ ხარაზია

Mayor of Sukhumi
- In office 22 October 2014 – 21 October 2019
- President: Raul Khajimba
- Preceded by: Alias Labakhua
- Succeeded by: Kan Kvarchia
- In office 5 November 2004 – 16 February 2005
- President: Vladislav Ardzinba
- Preceded by: Leonid Lolua
- Succeeded by: Astamur Adleiba

Adgur Rafet-ipa Kharaziya (Abkhaz: Адгəыр Рафеҭ-иԥа Ҳаразиа; Georgian: ადგურ ხარაზია) is an Abkhazian politician who served as the mayor of Sukhumi from 2014 to 2019. He was also the Minister of Agriculture of Abkhazia and the Vice Speaker of the People's Assembly.

In 2024, Kharazia, having been elected as an MP in 2022, opened fire in the parliament building, killing one MP, Vakhtang Golandzia and wounding another one.

== Acting mayor of Sukhumi (first time) ==
Adgur Kharaziya was head of the Gulripshi District assembly before he was appointed acting mayor of Sukhumi by president Vladislav Ardzinba on 5 November 2004, in the heated aftermath of the 2004 presidential election, succeeding Leonid Lolua. During his first speech he called upon the two leading candidates, Sergei Bagapsh and Raul Khadjimba, to both withdraw.

On 16 February 2005, newly elected President Bagapsh replaced Kharaziya with Astamur Adleiba as mayor of Sukhumi.

== Member of the People's Assembly of Abkhazia ==
In the 2007 parliamentary elections Adgur Kharaziya successfully stood as candidate in the Dranda precinct No. 24, winning a majority in the first round. He formed part of the opposition. During the assembly's first meeting after the election Kharaziya was nominated for the position of speaker by fellow MP Rita Lolua but lost to Nugzar Ashuba. On 27 July 2007, Kharaziya took part in a round table on free speech organised by journalists that called upon the government to end what it called the pursuit of independent and opposition media. On the 20th of May 2025, Adgur Kharaziya was stripped of his parliamentary powers and replaced by MP Jopua Astamur Daurovich who ran uncontested in the Dranda electoral district No.26 on the 26 July 2025.

== Mayor of Sukhumi (second time) ==
Following the May 2014 Revolution and the election of Raul Khajimba, Kharaziya was again appointed acting mayor of Sukhumi on 22 October 2014. On 4 April 2015, he won the by-election to the city council in constituency no. 3 unopposed, and was confirmed as mayor on 4 May.

== 2024 shooting ==
On 19 December 2024, fellow lawmaker Vakhtang Golandzia was killed and another one, Kan Kvarchia, was injured in a shooting inside the Abhkaz parliament building. Kharazia was identified as the suspect in the shooting.

== 2025 arrest ==
Kharaziya was detained on 14 June 2025 as part of a joint operation by the State Security Service and Ministry of Internal Affairs. He had evaded arrest for 6 months. The criminal charges against him carried a maximum jail sentence of 12 years.

Another man, Bagrat Surmava, was detained on the same day for allegedly shooting 25 rifle shots at Kharaziya's house.

Preceded by Leonid Lolua	acting Mayor of Sukhumi; 2004–2005	Succeeded by Astamur Adleiba
Preceded by Alias Labakhua	Mayor of Sukhumi; 2014–2019	Succeeded by Kan Kvarchia
