= People's Party of Abkhazia =

People's Party of Abkhazia Аԥсны Ажәлартә Апартиа აფხაზეთის სახალხო პარტია Народная Партия Абхазии
- Leader: Iakub Lakoba
- Founded: 20 March 1992
- Ideology: Centrism; Abkhaz nationalism
- Political position: Centre-right
- Colours: Red

Website
- http://kiaraz.org

The People's Party of Abkhazia (Abkhaz: Аԥсны Ажәлартә Апартиа; Georgian: აფხაზეთის სახალხო პარტია, romanized: apkhazetis sakhalkho p'art'ia; Russian: Народная Партия Абхазии) is an oppositional political party in Abkhazia led by Iakub Lakoba. Its founding congress was held on 20 March 1992, and it claims to be the oldest political party in Abkhazia.

At its fourth congress on 22 September 1999, the party adopted its current charter and elected its current Chairman, Iakub Lakoba.

The People's Party was one of the parties that stood at the basis of the Forum of Abkhaz People's Unity founded 8 February 2005. On 30 January 2008 it was announced the People's Party and the newly founded Party for Economic Development of Abkhazia had signed a cooperation agreement.

On 10 July 2013, the People's Party signed a cooperation agreement with fellow opposition parties United Abkhazia, the Forum for the National Unity of Abkhazia and the Party for the Economic Development of Abkhazia, and with a number of social movements.

On 29 February 2016, the People's Party became a founding member of the Council for the National Unity of the Republic of Abkhazia, uniting political forces that were neither pro-government nor pro-opposition.
