= Astamur Adleiba =

Abkhazian politician

Astamur Anton-ipa Adleiba Асҭамыр Антон-иҧа Адлеиба ასტამურ ადლეიბა

Mayor of Sukhumi
- In office 16 February 2005 – 2 May 2007
- Preceded by: Adgur Kharazia
- Succeeded by: Anzor Kortua (acting)

Personal details
- Born: 1960 (age 65–66) Sukhumi, Abkhazian ASSR, Georgian SSR, USSR

Astamur Anton-ipa Adleiba (Abkhaz: Асҭамыр Антон-иҧа Адлеиба, Georgian: ასტამურ ადლეიბა) is a former Minister of Youth, Sports, Tourism and Resorts of Abkhazia and a former mayor of Abkhazia's capital Sukhumi. He was dismissed from this last position for corruption.

== Early life and career ==
Astamur Adleiba was born in 1960 in Sukhumi. From 1977 until 1984 he was a student of the Georgian State University of Subtropical Agriculture in Sukhumi. From 1979 until 1981 Adleiba was engaged in community service for the Soviet army and in 1981-1982 he was an instructor with the Sukhumi city committee of the Komsomol. From 1982 until 1984 Adleiba served as an agronomist in the ministry of agriculture of the Abkhazian ASSR and from 1984 until 1986 he served as an agronomist in the state committee for agricultural production of the autonomous republic. From 1986 until 1989 Adleiba was the chief agronomist in the Kindga poultry farms and from 1989 until 1992 he was the vice-president of the council for collective farms in the Abkhazian ASSR.

After the 1992-1993 war with Georgia, from 1993 until 2002 Adleiba was the director of the tourist-hotel Aytar. In December 2002 he was appointed Minister of Youth, Sports, Tourism and Resorts by President Vladislav Ardzinba.

== Mayor of Sukhumi ==
After coming to power, the new President Sergei Bagapsh made Astamur Adleiba mayor of Sukhumi on 16 February 2005, replacing Adgur Kharazia, who had been appointed only 4 months before by outgoing president Ardzinba. In the 11 February 2007 local elections, Adleiba successfully defended his seat in the Sukhumi city assembly and was thereupon reappointed mayor by Bagapsh on 20 March .

In April 2007, while President Bagapsh was in Moscow for medical treatment, the results of an investigation into corruption within the Sukhumi city administration were made public. The investigation found that large sums had been embezzled and upon his return, on 2 May, Bagapsh fired Adleiba along with his deputy Boris Achba, the head of the Sukhumi's finance department Konstantin Tuzhba and the head of the housing department David Jinjolia.

On 4 June Adleiba paid back to the municipal budget 200,000 rubels. On 23 July, Adleiba resigned from the Sukhumi city council, citing health reasons and the need to travel abroad for medical treatment.

Preceded by Adgur Kharazia	Mayor of Sukhumi; 2005–2007	Succeeded by Anzor Kortua (acting)
