= Vakhtang Golandzia =

Abkhazian politician (1969–2024)

Vakhtang Golandzia (16 September 1969 – 19 December 2024) was an Abkhazian politician who was a member of the parliament of Abkhazia. He was killed during the Parliament of Abkhazia shooting on 19 December 2024, at the age of 55.
