= Ardzinba Government =

Government of the Republic of Abkhazia

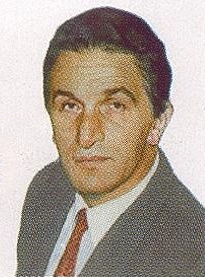
Vladislav Ardzinba

The Ardzinba Government or the Government of Vladislav Ardzinba was the first Government of the Republic of Abkhazia.

The government was composed mostly of Abkhazians, but also included two Greeks, two Armenians, one Russian and one pro-Abkhazian Georgian.

The Ardzinba government orchestrated an ethnic cleansing campaign against ethnic Georgians in Abkhazia in 1993.

In 1995, a United Nations official described the Ardzinba Government as "a typical totalitarian, dictatorial regime".

President	Vladislav Ardzinba; 26 November 1994 - 12 February 2005										
Vice-President	Valeri Arshba; 5 January 1995 - 12 February 2005										
Head of the Presidential Administration	Miron Agrba ? - 15 December 2003								Gennady Gagulia; 15 December 2003 - 18 June 2004	Emma Avidzba ? - 15 February 2005	
Secretary of the Security Council	?				Astamur Tarba; 2 February 2000 - 1 May 2003				Almasbei Kchach; 6 June 2003 - 17 February 2005		
Head of the State Security Service	Astamur Tarba; 1995 - December 1999				Raul Khajimba; December 1999 - 1 November 2001		Zurab Agumava; 1 November 2001 - 2 April 2003		Givi Agrba; 2 April 2003 - 7 July 2004	Mikhail Tarba; 7 July 2004 - 28 February 2005	
Cabinet:
Prime Minister	Gennady Gagulia; January 1995 - 24 April 1997		Sergei Bagapsh; 29 April 1997 - December 1999		Viacheslav Tsugba; 20 December 1999 - 30 May 2001	Anri Jergenia; 7 June 2001 - 29 November 2002		Gennady Gagulia; 29 November 2002 - 8 April 2003	Raul Khajimba; 22 April 2003 - 6 October 2004		Nodar Khashba; 6 October 2004 - 14 February 2005
First Vice Premiers	Sergei Bagapsh; 1995-1997		Konstantin Ozgan; 1997 - 1999		Beslan Kubrava; 1999 - 18 June 2001	Raul Khajimba; 18 June 2001 - 22 April 2003			Astamur Tarba; 1 May 2003 - 2004		
First Vice Premiers			Viacheslav Tsugba; May 1997 - April 1998					Ruslan Ardzinba; 9 December 2002 - 1 May 2003			
Vice Premiers	Yuri Voronov; 18 February - 11 September 1995	Albert Topolyan; 1996 - 1999			Yuri Aqaba; 2 February 2000 - 2001	Beslan Kubrava ? - August 2001 - 9 December 2002			Emma Tania; 1 May 2003 - 2004		Viktor Khilchevski; 14 December 2004 - 24 February 2005
Vice Premiers	?		Nuri Gezerdaa; 1997 - June 2001 - ?			Vladimir Zantaria; 19 July 2001 - 14 December 2004					Sergei Shamba; 14 December 2004 - 24 February 2005
Vice Premiers	Vladimir Mikanba; 1992 - 1999										
Chief of the Cabinet Office	Viacheslav Tsugba ? - September 1996	Grigori Enik ? - April 1998		Viacheslav Tsugba; 1998? - 1999?	Konstantin Tuzhba ? - September 2000 - 18 December 2002			Beslan Kubrava; 18 December 2002 - 8 May 2003	Oleg Botsiev; 8 May 2003 - 2005		
Cabinet Ministers:
Defence	Sultan Sosnaliyev; 25 April 1993 - 2 June 1996	Vladimir Mikanba; 2 June 1996 - 16 May 2002					Raul Khajimba; 16 May 2002 - 22 April 2003		Viacheslav Eshba; 5 May 2003 - 25 February 2005		
Internal Affairs	Givi Agrba; 1993 - 2 June 1996	Almasbei Kchach; 2 June 1996 - 2 July 2001				Zurab Agumava; 2 July - 1 November 2001	Almasbei Kchach; 1 November 2001 - 8 May 2003		Abesalom Beia; 8 May 2003 - 25 February 2005		
Foreign Affairs	Leonid Lakerbaia; 29 June 1995 - 31 July 1996	Konstantin Ozgan; 31 July 1996 - April 1997	Sergei Shamba; 7 May 1997 - 18 June 2004						Gueorgui Otyrba; 18 June - 28 July 2004	Igor Akhba; 28 July - 14 December 2004	Sergei Shamba; 14 December 2004 - 21 March 2005
Finance	Lili Bganba; 21 December 1993 – 24 February 2005										
Economy since 9 December 2002: Economy and Foreign Economic Relations	Konstantin Tuzhba; 1995 - 1998		Konstantin Ozgan; 1998 - 16 April 1998	Beslan Kubrava; 16 April 1998 - December 1999	Adgur Lushba; December 1999 - 28 May 2002		Beslan Kubrava; 28 May 2002 - 9 December 2002	Ruslan Ardzinba; 9 December 2002 - 8 May 2003	Konstantin Tuzhba; 8 May 2003 - 25 February 2005		
Agriculture since 17 September 2001: Agriculture and Food	Yuri Aqaba; 1995 - 2 February 2000				Anatoli Sabua; 2 February 2000 - 19 June 2001	Jemal Eshba; 19 June 2001 - 18 December 2002		Adgur Kharazia; 18 December 2002 - 8 May 2003	Vitali Smyr; 8 May 2003 - 25 February 2005		
Justice	Raul Jinjolia; 1994 - 1996	Batal Tabagua; September 1995 - 18 December 2002						Tengiz Lakerbaia; 18 December 2002 – 15 December 2004			Gennadi Stepanov; 15 December 2004 - 7 April 2005
Health since 9 December 2002: Health and Social Security	Appolon Gurgulia; 1994 - 1999				Lyudmila Avidzba; December 1999 – 25 February 2005						
Education since 2002: General, Secondary and Higher Education	Beslan Dbar; January 1995 – 18 December 2002							Aleko Gvaramia; 18 December 2002 - 13 November 2003		Tali Japua; 13 November 2003 - 1 February 2005	Natalya Kayun; 1 February 2005 - 10 March 2005
Culture	Kesou Khagba; 1995 - 1999				Vladimir Zantaria; 1999 - 19 July 2001	Leonid Enik; 2001 - 10 March 2005					
Labour and Social Security	Nikolai Mistokopulo ? - February 1998 - ?				Oleg Botsiev; December 1999 - 9 December 2002						
Taxes and Fees								Adgur Lushba; 18 December 2002 - 25 February 2005			
Youth, Sports, Resorts and Tourism						Valeri Bartsits; 2001 - 17 September 2001	Albert Topolyan; 17 September 2001 - 18 December 2002	Astamur Adleiba; 18 December 2002 - 14 December 2004			
Emergency Situations											Sergei Matosyan; 14 December 2004 - 24 February 2005
Chairmen of State Committees:
Customs	Aleksandr Aiba; 1995 - 1997		Aslan Kobakhia; 1997 -18 December 2002					Grigori Enik; 18 December 2002 - 14 December 2004			Lavrik Mikvabia; 14 December 2004 - 24 February 2005
Property Management and Privatisation				Tamaz Gogia; March 1998 - 18 December 2002				Astamur Appba; 18 December 2002 - May 2004 - ?			Aleksandr Chengelia; 14 December 2004 - 24 February 2005
Foreign Economical Relations	?					Ruslan Iazychba ? - August 2000 - 19 June 2001 - ?					
Relations with Compatriots since 1997: Repatriation	Fenia Avidzba; 1995 - 1997		Givi Dopua; 1997 - 2000		Apollon Shinkuba; 2000 - 2001	Givi Dopua; 27 June 2001 - 2004					
Standards, Metrology and Certification	Nerses Nersesyan ? - June 2000 - ?					Elena Gunia; 27 June 2001 - 24 February 2005					
Youth Affairs and Sports					Valeri Bartsits ? - February 2000 - 29 June 2001						
Forest since December 2004: Forestry										Eduard Jergenia; 28 April 2004 - 24 February 2005	

== Formation ==
In February 1995, the Ministry for Energy was transformed into the state company Abkhazenergo, renamed to Chernomorenergo in June. The Ministry for Industry and the Ministry for Transport and Communication were also abolished.

== Changes ==
- On the night of 11 September 1995, Vice Premier Yuri Voronov was shot dead in front of his apartment.
- On 2 June 1996, President Ardzinba dismissed Interior Minister Givi Agrba for unsatisfactory work and Defence Minister Sultan Sosnaliyev for family reasons, and replaced them with, respectively, the head of his own security office Almasbei Kchach and Vice-Premier Vladimir Mikanba.
- On 24 April 1997, Prime Minister Gennady Gagulia resigned for health reasons. On 29 April, President Ardzinba appointed First Vice Premier Sergei Bagapsh as his successor. Bagapsh was replaced as First Vice-Premier by Foreign Minister Konstantin Ozgan, who was in turn replaced by Sergei Shamba on 30 April.
- In February 1998, Justice Minister Batal Tabagua was additionally appointed the representative of President Ardzinba to the People's Assembly. In August, Tabagua was instead appointed the Abkhazian representative to the peace negotiations with Georgia, replacing Tamaz Ketsba.
- In March 1998, President Ardzinba decreed the creation of the State Committee for State Property Management and Privatisation and appointed Tamaz Gogia as its Chairman.
- On 16 April, Konstantin Ozgan was replaced as Economy Minister by Beslan Kubrava, who had previously headed the State Tax Service.
- In April 1998, President Ardzinba signed a decree on the creation of the State Committee for Repatriation.
- In April 1998, President Ardzinba dismissed Viacheslav Tsugba as First Vice Premier, Grigori Enik as Head of the Cabinet Office as well as two other Vice Premiers.
- In May 1998, President Arzinba signed a decree reducing the number of Deputy Ministers in each department except the Interior and Defence to one.
- Ardzinba was re-elected unopposed in on 3 October 1999 and his re-inauguration was scheduled for 6 December.
- After a bomb attack on 13 December 1999 in Sukhumi targeting government officials, President Ardzinba dismissed Astamur Tarba as Security Service Chairman and replaced him with First Deputy Chairman of the State Customs Committee Raul Khajimba.
- On 2 February 2000, Iuri Aqaba was appointed Vice-Premier and succeeded as Agriculture Minister by Anatoli Sabua. Astamur Tarba was appointed Secretary of the Security Council.
- On 18 June 2001, Chairman of the State Security Service Raul Khajimba was appointed First Vice-Premier, succeeding Beslan Kubrava. On 19 June, the Head of the Cabinet Staff and the Chairmen of the State Committees for Customs, State Property Management and Foreign Economical Relations, and on 20 June, the Ministers for Defence, Foreign Affairs, Finance, Economy, Agriculture, Justice, Health, Education and Culture were re-appointed. On 27 June, Givi Dopua was appointed as Chairman for the State Committee for Repatriation, Elena Gunia as Chairman of the State Committee for Standards, Metrology and Certification, and outgoing Interior Minister Almasbei Kchach head of the presidential security detail. On 29 June, President Ardzinba approved the revised Cabinet structure, which included the new Ministry for Youth, Sports, Resorts and Tourism. On 2 July, Supreme Court Judge Zurab Agumava was appointed Minister of the Interior.
- On 19 July, Vladimir Zantaria was released as Culture Minister and appointed Vice-Premier.
- On 17 September, President Ardzinba signed a decree renaming the Ministry for Agriculture into the Ministry of Agriculture and Food and appointed Albert Topoloyan Minister for Youth, Sports, Resorts and Tourism, replacing acting minister Valeri Bartsits.
- On 1 November, First Vice Premier Raul Khajimba was released as Head of the State Security Service, a post which up until then he had still occupied. He was succeeded by Interior Minister Zurab Agumava, who in turn was succeeded by his predecessor Almasbei Kchach.
- On 16 May 2002, Raul Khajimba replaced Vladimir Mikanba as Defence Minister, while remaining First Vice-Premier.
- On 28 May 2002, President Ardzinba dismissed Konstantin Ozgan as Head of the Revenue Service due to his election as Deputy of the People's Assembly. He was replaced by Economy Minister Adgur Lushba, who was in turn replaced by Vice-Premier Beslan Kubrava (while remaining Vice-Premier).
- On 29 November 2002, Prime Minister Jergenia was fired by President Ardzinba, officially due to his failure to ensure fulfillment of budget targets and to prepare adequately for winter. However, for the first nine months of that year budget had been implemented fully and Jergenia's dismissal was widely seen as politically motivated, having been too openly ambitious about the presidency, and putting Russian above Abkhazian interests. Jergenia was replaced by the Head of the Commerce Chamber, former Prime Minister Gennady Gagulia. On 9 December, Ardzinba decreed the new structure of the cabinet. The State Committee for Foreign Economic Relations was merged into the Ministry for Economy, becoming the Ministry for Economy and Foreign Economic Relations. The Ministry for Labour and Social Security was merged into the Ministry for Health, becoming the Ministry for Health and Social Security. The State Tax Service was transformed into the Ministry for Taxes and Fees. That same day, Ardzinba re-appointed Khajimba as First Vice Premier and Defence Minister and Zantaria as Vice Premier, and he appointed Ruslan Ardzinba, previously deputy chairman of the State Committee for Foreign Economic Relations, as Minister for Economy and Foreign Economic Relations as well as First Vice Premier (alongside Khajimba). On 18 December, the remaining members of the cabinet were appointed. Outgoing Economy Minister and Vice Premier Beslan Kubrava succeeded Konstantin Tuzhba as Chief of the Cabinet Staff. Adgur Lushba, also a former Economy Minister, was appointed as the new Minister for Taxes and Fees. Gulripshi District Head Adgur Kharazia replaced Jemal Eshba as Minister for Agriculture and Food, Tengiz Lakerbaia Batal Tabagua as Minister for Justice, Astamur Adleiba Albert Topolyan as Minister for Youth, Sports, Resorts and Tourism and Astamur Appba Tamaz Gogia as Chairman of the State Committee for Property Management and Privatisation. Gagra District Head Grigori Enik succeeded Aslan Kobakhia as Head of the State Customs Committee and Abkhazian State University Rector Aleko Gvaramia succeeded Beslan Dbar as Minister for General, Secondary and Higher Education (while remaining Rector). On 26 December, Appba was succeeded as the President's Representative to the People's Assembly by Marina Pilia, who up to then had worked in the President's Administration.
- On 2 April 2003, Advisor to the President on Military Matters Givi Agrba was appointed Head of the State Security Service, replacing Zurab Agumava.
- In the evening of 7 April 2003, Gagulia's government filed for resignation. Early in the morning of that day, nine prisoners had escaped, four of which had been sentenced to death due to their involvement in the 2001 Kodori crisis. President Ardzinba initially refused to accept Gagulia's resignation, but was forced to agree on 8 April. Vice President Valery Arshba denied on 8 April that the government's resignation was due to the prison escape, and stated that instead it was caused by the opposition's plans to hold protest rallies on 10 April. On 22 April 2003, Raul Khajimba was appointed the new Prime Minister. On 1 May, Ardzinba agreed the new (mostly unchanged) cabinet structure. Secretary of the Security Council Astamur Tarba was appointed Khajimba's successor as First Vice Premier, and Vice-Chairman of the National Bank Emma Tania was appointed Vice Premier. On 5 May, Viacheslav Eshba was appointed Khajimba's successor as Defence Minister and some other ministers were re-appointed. On 8 May, several more appointments were made: Abesalom Beia succeeded Almasbei Kchach as Interior Minister, New Athos Mayor Vitali Smyr Adgur Kharazia as Agriculture Minister, Konstantin Tuzhba Ruslan Ardzinba as Economy Minister and Oleg Botsiev Beslan Kubrava as Chief of the Cabinet Staff. On 6 June, Almasbei Kchach was appointed Secretary of the Security Council.
- On 1 September 2003, Aleko Gvaramia handed his resignation as Education Minister. On 15 September, acting president Valery Arshba declared that he had not yet officially accepted Gvaramia's resignation. On 13 November, President Ardzinba officially granted Gvaramia's request and appointed Head of the State Fund for the Development of the Abkhaz language Tali Japua in his stead.
- On 15 December 2003, President Ardzinba replaced the head of the Presidential Administration Miron Agrba with Gennady Gagulia.
- On 9 January 2004, President Ardzinba decreed the creation of the State Committee for Forest. On 28 April, Ardzinba appointed Abkhazles head Eduard Jergenia as its Chairman.
- On 15 June 2004, Foreign Minister Sergei Shamba, First Vice-Premier Astamur Tarba and Security Service Chairman Givi Agrba resigned following the murder of opposition politician Garri Aiba. Tarba eventually stayed on, Shamba was temporarily replaced by his deputy Gueorgui Otyrba on 18 July, and permanently by Igor Akhba on 28 July. On 7 July Agrba's resignation was accepted and he was replaced by Mikhail Tarba. Head of the Presidential Administration Gennady Gagulia also handed his resignation on 18 June (granted the same day) because he didn't want to be part of Prime Minister Khajimba's presidential campaign. On 24 June, Gagulia was elected to once more head the Chamber of Commerce, succeeding Yuri Aqaba who resigned to pursue his academic work.
- On 10 November 2004, Ardzinba appointed outgoing Vice Premier Emma Tania acting Chairman of the National Bank of the Republic of Abkhazia. On 14 December, Ardzinba decreed the new cabinet structure and made a number of ministerial appointments. The position of First Vice Premier was abolished and presidential candidate Sergei Shamba and Viktor Khilchevski were appointed to succeed Vlamir Zantaria and Emma Tania as Vice Premiers. Shamba was also appointed as Foreign Minister, the position he had resigned from in June, succeeding Igor Akhba. A new Ministry for Emergency Situations was created, to which deputy Interior Minister Sergei Matosyan was appointed. The portfolio for Youth, Sports, Resorts and Tourism was redistributed over the existing Ministries for Education (Youth and Sports) and Economy (Resorts and Tourism). A number of Ministries and State Committees received slightly different names: Economy and Foreign Economic Relations was shortened to Economic Development, Agriculture and Food to Agriculture and General, Secondary and Higher Education to Education while Repatriation was extended to Repatriation and Demography and Forest to Forestry. Outgoing Deputy Chairman Lavrik Mikvabia was appointed Chairman of the Customs State Committee instead of Grigori Enik and Abkhazia's Plenipotentiary in Karachay-Cherkessia Aleksandr Chengelia Chairman of the Property Management and Privatisation State Committee instead of Astamur Appba. The following day, Zantaria was appointed head of the newly created Agency for Press, Information and Telecommunications, Supreme Court Chairman Gennadi Stepanov was appointed Minister for Justice instead of Tengiz Lakerbaia and Oleg Botsiev was re-appointed as Head of the Cabinet Staff. On 23 December, Eduard Jergenia was re-appointed as Chairman of the Forest(ry) State Committee.
- On 1 February 2005, Ardzinba accepted the resignation of Education Minister Tali Japua, who was temporarily replaced by his deputy Natalya Kayun.
