= Government of Aslan Bzhania =

Government of Abkhazia

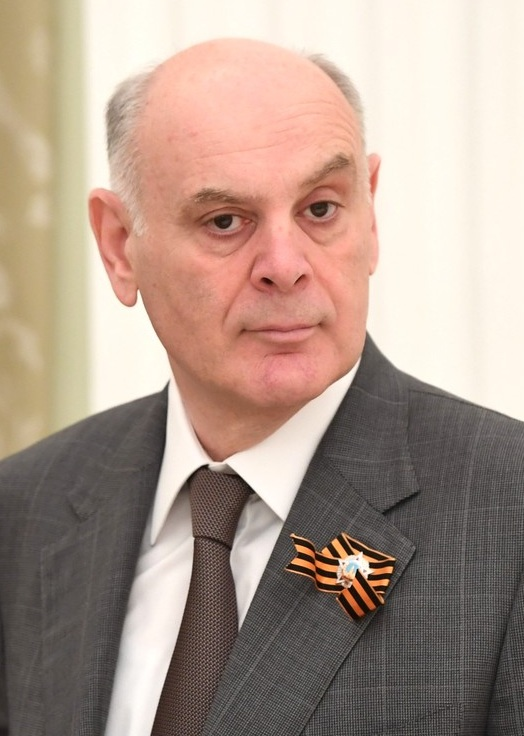

The Government of President Aslan Bzhania was the Government of the Republic of Abkhazia from 2020 to 2024.

== Composition ==
President	Aslan Bzhania; 23 April 2020 – 19 November 2024				
Vice President	Badra Gunba; 23 April 2020 – 19 November 2024				
Head of the Presidential Administration	Alkhas Kvitsinia; 24 April 2020 – 19 November 2024				
Secretary of the Security Council	Sergei Shamba; 28 July 2020 – 19 November 2024				
Head of the State Security Service	Vladimir Arlan; 12 – 18 May 2020	Robert Kiyut; 18 May 2020 – 19 November 2024			
Cabinet leadership:
Prime Minister	Alexander Ankvab; 24 April 2020 – 19 November 2024				
First Vice Premier	Beslan Jopua; 28 April 2020 – 19 November 2024				
Vice Premier(s)	Vladimir Delba; 28 April 2020 – 19 November 2024				
Vice Premier(s)	Kristina Ozgan; 4 May 2020 – 19 November 2024				
Vice Premier(s)		Sergei Pustovalov; 22 July 2020 – 19 November 2024			
Chief of the Cabinet Staff	David Sangulia; 22 July 2020 – 19 November 2024				
Ministers:
Internal Affairs	Dmitry Dbar; 30 April 2020 – 2 December 2020		Ruslan Azhiba; 2 – 6 December 2020	Walter Butba; 6 December 2020 – 19 November 2024	
Health	Tamaz Tsakhnakia; 29 April 2020 – 11 May 2021		Eduard Butba; 11 May 2021 – 19 November 2024		
Foreign Affairs	Daur Kove; 15 July 2020 – 17 November 2021		Inal Ardzinba; 17 November 2021 – 19 November 2024		
Culture	Gudisa Agrba; 5 June 2020 – 11 February 2022			Dinara Smyr; 11 February – 6 April 2022	Daur Kove; 6 April 2022 – 19 November 2024
Defence	Vladimir Anua; 1 June 2020 – 19 November 2024				
Education and Language Policy	Inal Gablia; 19 June 2020 – 19 November 2024				
Agriculture	Beslan Jopua; 28 April 2020 – 19 November 2024				
Social Security and Demography Policy	Ruslan Ajba; 29 April 2020 – 19 November 2024				
Finance	Vladimir Delba; 28 April 2020 – 19 November 2024				
Economy	Kristina Ozgan; 4 May 2020 – 19 November 2024				
Justice	Anri Bartsits; 6 July 2020 – 19 November 2024				
Emergency Situations	Lev Kvitsinia; 29 April 2020 – 19 November 2024				
Tourism	Teimuraz Khizhba; 12 May 2020 – 19 November 2024				
Taxes and Duties	Daur Kurmazia; 30 April 2020 – 4 February 2021	Merab Logua; 4 February – 11 May 2021	Djansukh Nanba; 11 May 2021 – 19 November 2024		
Chairmen of State Committees:
Youth Policy and Sports	Jamal Gubaz; 21 May 2020 – 19 November 2024				
Repatriation	Vadim Kharazia; 21 May 2020 – 19 November 2024				
Ecology	Saveli Chitanava; 20 May 2020 – 19 November 2024				
Statistics	Kama Gogia; 20 May 2020 – 19 November 2024				
Standards, Consumer and Technical Supervision	Galust Trapizonyan; 27 Mai 2020 – 18 April 2022				Narsou Sangulia; 18 April 2022 – 19 November 2024
Customs	Guram Inapshba; 22 July 2020 – 10 February 2021	Otar Khetsia; 12 February 2021 – 19 November 2024			
State Property Management and Privatisation	Beslan Kubrava; 22 July 2020 – 19 November 2024				
Telecommunication, Mass Media and Digital Development	Beslan Khalvash; 20 May 2020 – 19 November 2024				

== Formation ==
President Aslan Bzhania and Vice President Badra Gunba were elected on 22 March 2020 after the resignation of previous President Raul Khajimba, and sworn in on 23 April 2020.

On 28 April a decision about the structure of the forthcoming government was announced: Prime Minister, First Vice Premier, three ordinary Vice Premiers, 14 ministers and 8 Chairmen of State Committees. At the same time Beslan Jopua and Vladimir Delba were appointed as First Vice Premier and Vice Premier plus Finance Minister respectively.

A day later, on 29 April, Tamaz Tsakhnakia was re-appointed as Health Minister, continuing his tenure from the previous government and Lev Kvitsinia was similarly re-appointed as Emergency Situations Minister. TAt the same time a new Social Security and Demography Policy Minister Ruslan Ajba.

On 30 April Dmitry Dbar was appointed by the president as a new Internal Affairs Minister and Daur Kurmazia was re-appointed as a Taxes and Duties Minister.

On 4 May Kristina Ozgan was appointed as a Vice Premier and as an Economy Minister (she had previously held that position more than 8 years ago).

On 12 May Teimuraz Khizhba was appointed as Tourism Minister while Major general Vladimir Arlan was appointed as interim Head of the State Security Service.

On 20 May three Chairmen of State Committees were appointed to their respective duties: Statistics; Telecommunication, Massmedia and Digital Development; and Ecology. A day later on 21 May two other Chairmen were appointed: Youth Policy and Sports; and Repatriation.

On 27 May Galust Trapizonyan was appointed as Chairman of State Committee for Standards, Consumer and Technical Supervision.

On 1 June Colonel general Vladimir Anua who until that day served as a deputy Defence Minister, was appointed as Defence Minister.

On 5 June Gudisa Agrba was appointed as Culture Minister.

On 19 June two new ministers were appointed: Inal Gablia as an Education and Language Policy Minister and Beslan Jopua who had already been serving his term as a Vice Premier as a new Agriculture Minister.

On 6 July Anri Bartsits was appointed as Justice Minister.

On 15 July Daur Kove was re-appointed as a Foreign Affairs Minister, continuing his tenure from the previous government.

On 22 July Guram Inapshba was re-appointed as a Head of the State Committee of Customs and Beslan Kubrava was appointed as a new Chairman of the State Committee of State Property Management and Privatisation. At the same time a third Vice Premier was chosen and appointed: Sergei Pustovalov. David Sangulia was re-appointed as a Chief of the Cabinet Staff on that day as well, continuing his tenure.

On 28 July, veteran politician Sergei Shamba was appointed as a new Secretary of the Security Council.

== Changes ==
- Shortly after his appointment Vladimir Arlan ended his tenure as a Head of the State Security Service and on 18 May 2020 President Bzhania issued a decree to appoint Robert Kiyut as a Deputy Head of the State Security Service who was meant to lead this organisation until a proper new Head would have been chosen.
- On 4 February 2021 Daur Kurmazia resigned from his office as a Taxes and Duties Minister. His Deputy Merab Logua was to lead the Ministry as a temporary solution.
- On 10 February 2021 the President Aslan Bzhania promoted Robert Kiyut to become proper Head of the State Security Service. Until that time Kiyut had served as a leader of the State Security Service from the position of a Deputy as the position of the Head had been vacant. At the same time Guram Inapshba was promoted to the rank of Major general, dismissed from the office of Chairman of the State Committee for Customs and transferred to do different job. For two days his deputy Alias Labakhua took over his responsibilities. On 12 February his successor was chosen. Otar Khetsia was appointed as a new Chairman of the State Committee for Customs.
- On 11 May 2021 Tamaz Tsakhnakia was dismissed from his position of Health Minister. He himself asked to be dismissed because he had been already working as the head of Ministry for four years. Eduard Butba became a new health Minister instead. At the same time economist, former Finance Minister and Vice Premier Djansukh Nanba was appointed as a new Taxes and Duties Minister.
- On 17 November 2021 Daur Kove was dismissed from his office of the Foreign Affairs Minister and became Shamba's deputy of Secretary of the Security Council. Young politician Inal Ardzinba was appointed as a new Foreign Affairs Minister.
- On 2 December 2021 Dmitri Dbar was dismissed from his position of Internal Affairs Minister, because he was appointed as a new supreme commanding officer of The State Security Service of the Republic of Abkhazia. Major general Ruslan Azhiba was as a Deputy Minister assigned to the task of leading the Ministry as a temporary solution. Dbar's official successor was Walter Butba since 6 December.
- On 11 February 2022 the Culture Minister Gudisa Agrba asked President Bzhania to be dismissed from his office. His Deputy Dinara Smyr was chosen to temporarily take over his duty.
- On 6 April 2022 Daur Kove returned to this government when he accepted the offer to become a new Culture Minister.
- On 18 April 2022 the Chairman of Standards, Consumer and Technical Supervision State Committee Galust Trapizonyan was dismissed from his office, because he was elected as a People's Assembly of Abkhazia Deputy. According to the laws of the Republic of Abkhazia no one can combine parliamentary duties with other activities. Narsou Sangulia was appointed to be his successor.
