= Abkhazia–Venezuela relations =

- Abkhazia: Venezuela

Abkhazia–Venezuela relations refers to bilateral relations between the breakaway Republic of Abkhazia and Venezuela. Venezuela recognised Abkhazia, along with South Ossetia, on 10 September 2009, almost ten years after the country declared independence from Georgia in 1999. Venezuela was the third state to recognise Abkhazia and South Ossetia, after Russia and Nicaragua.

During the 2019 Venezuelan presidential crisis, interim president Juan Guaidó sought to withdraw the recognition of Abkhazia and South Ossetia and improve relations with Georgia once a new government was created.

== Recognition by Venezuela of Abkhazia's independence ==
Venezuelan president Hugo Chávez announced that his government recognised Abkhazia and South Ossetia when he was hosted by Russian president Dmitry Medvedev in Moscow. Chávez also announced that formal diplomatic relations would be established with both republics. Relations between Abkhazia and Venezuela had already been good before recognition. Deputy of the National Assembly of Venezuela Luis Tascón Gutiérrez visited Abkhazia in November 2006 and declared that Abkhazia had friends in Venezuela and that Venezuela would support its quest for independence. President Chávez also defended Russia's recognition of Abkhazia and South Ossetia in August 2008, stating "Russia has recognized the independence of Abkhazia and South Ossetia. We support Russia. Russia is right and is defending its interests."

Following the announcement of recognition, Abkhazian president Sergei Bagapsh responded: "We have always looked to Venezuela and some other Latin American countries with hope. An Abkhazian delegation is now in Caracas after visiting Cuba and Nicaragua, where they received a warm welcome and support." The Georgian Foreign Ministry condemned the decision by the Venezuelan government, referring to President Chávez as a "dictator" in an official statement made later on the same day.

== Diplomatic relations and exchange of ambassadors ==
Abkhazia and Venezuela have established diplomatic relations at the ambassadorial level. Venezuela's ambassador to Abkhazia is resident in Moscow.

On 11 July 2010, Ambassador Extraordinary and Plenipotentiary of the Republic of Venezuela Hugo Jose Garcia Hernandez presented his credentials to Abkhazia's Minister for Foreign Affairs Maxim Gvinjia, and on 12 July, to President Bagapsh. A formal document on the establishing of diplomatic relations at the level of ambassadors was signed on 23 July during a state visit of President Bagapsh to Venezuela. On 6 December, Ambassador Extraordinary and Plenipotentiary of the Republic of Abkhazia Zaur Gvajava presented his credentials to Vice President Elías Jaua of Venezuela.

On 3 September 2015, Venezuela's new ambassador Juan Vicente Paredes Torrealba presented his credentials to Foreign Minister Viacheslav Chirikba and President Raul Khajimba.

== Further meetings ==
A meeting between the two governments' deputy foreign ministers in September 2009 reportedly focused on political and economic cooperation. Abkhazia has requested that Venezuela create a platform for lobbying the recognition of Abkhazia's independence in Latin America.

From 21 to 25 July 2012, an Abkhazian delegation headed by President Bagapsh visited Venezuela after a similar stay in Nicaragua, together with a similar delegation from South Ossetia. The visit was aimed at promoting international recognition and expanding relations within Latin America and the Caribbean. Prime Minister of Abkhazia Sergei Shamba said, "We believe that countries that respect the authority of Chavez as a regional leader will follow suit." On 22 July, the presidents of Abkhazia and South Ossetia were declared guests of honour of Venezuela and symbolically received the keys of the city of Caracas. On 23 July agreements were signed on the beginning of cooperation, on the establishing of diplomatic relations, on friendship and cooperation and on political dialogue. President Bagapsh also invited Venezolan oil producer PdVSA to invest in Abkhazia – this was seen as an attempt to lessen the Abkhaz dependence to Russia. The cooperation agreements were ratified by the National Assembly of Venezuela on 14 October. The treaty on cooperation and friendship formally came into force on 29 October 2012.

In 2019, Abkhaz president Raul Khajimba traveled to Venezuela as head of a delegation of his country. Khajimba attended the inauguration of Nicolás Maduro as the Venezuelan president.

== See also ==
- International recognition of Abkhazia and South Ossetia
