= Government of the Republic of Abkhazia =

Government of the partially recognised state

- Central government

Overview
- Established: 23 July 1992; 34 years ago
- State: Abkhazia
- Leader: President (Badra Gunba) and Prime Minister (Alexander Ankvab)

The Government of the Republic of Abkhazia governs the partially recognised Republic of Abkhazia.

== Executive branch ==
The Republic of Abkhazia is headed by the President, a post held since early 2020 by Aslan Bzhania, who is supported by the Vice President (Badr Gunba, inaugurated together with Bzhania). They are served by a cabinet of ministers, headed by a Prime Minister, a post currently held by Alexander Ankvab.

=== Current cabinet ===
Office	Incumbent	Since
Prime Minister	Vladimir Delba	3 April 2025
First Vice Premier	Belsan Jopua	15 October 2014
Vice Premier	Kristina Ozgan	3 April 2025
Minister for Internal Affairs	Walter Butba	Unknown
Minister for Health	Eduard Butba	Unknown
Minister for Foreign Affairs	Inal Ardzinba	Unknown
Minister for Culture	Daur Kove	Unknown
Minister for Defence	Vladimir Anua	Unknown
Minister for Education and Language Policy	Inal Gablia	Unknown
Minister for Agriculture	Beslan Jopua	Unknown
Minister for Social Security and Demographic Policy	Ruslan Ajba	Unknown
Minister for Finance	Vladimir Delba	Unknown
Minister for Economy	Kristina Ozgan	Unknown
Minister for Justice	Anri Bartsis	17 October 2014
Minister for Emergency Situations	Lev Kvitsinia	21 July 2014
Minister for Tourism	Teimuraz Khizhba	Unknown
Minister for Taxes and Duties	Jansukh Nanba	Unknown

== Legislative branch ==
The People's Assembly is the parliament of the Republic of Abkhazia.

== Judicial branch ==
=== Military Court ===
The Military Procuracy and Military Court were founded in March 1993. On 11 July 1993, the Military Court was turned into the Military Tribunal, but it was changed back on 1 July 1998.

=== Prosecutor General ===
The Prosecutor's Office was founded on 15 April 1994. The first Prosecutor General was Anri Jergenia. After Jergenia became Prime Minister in 2001, he was succeeded by Rauf Korua.

Following the October 2004 presidential election, lost by the pro-government candidate, outgoing Prime Minister Raul Khajimba, outgoing President Vladislav Ardzinba dismissed Korua on 17 October, for unspecified public statements and for failing to act against supposed violations during the elections. It was reported that Korua's dismissal was motivated by his support for opposition candidate Sergei Bagapsh, and for starting an investigation against Khajimba. The People's Assembly, controlled by supporters of Bagapsh, subsequently restored Korua to office. On 17 December, Ardzinba again suspended Korua and appointed his deputy Omiani Logua as acting Prosecutor General, this time following complaints by Abkhazian Railways head Rita Lolua. People's Assembly Speaker Nugzar Ashuba again rejected Ardzinba's decision and called upon Korua to continue his work.

In February 2007, Saferbei Mikanba was appointed as Prosecutor General.

Following the May 2014 Revolution, on 5 June the People's Assembly voted to dismiss Mikanba as Prosecutor General. The following day, acting President Valeri Bganba appointed Deputy Prosecutor General Zurab Agumava as Acting Prosecutor General. On 9 September, Bganba extended Agumava's temporary appointment until 7 October 2014. That day, the People's Assembly elected Deputy Minister for Internal Affairs Aleksei Lomia to become the new Prosecutor General with 26 votes in favour, 3 against and 1 abstention.

Lomia resigned on 26 July 2016, coinciding with the resignation of Prime Minister Artur Mikvabia, and his resignation was accepted on the following day by the People's Assembly. Lomia's successor, Nuri Tania, was only appointed on 28 September, after Summer recess. Tania was elected as Constitutional Court judge and released from the office of Prosecutor General less than four months later, on 18 January 2017, following an agreement between the government and the opposition whereby the opposition could nominate a new Prosecutor General. That same day, it elected with 23 votes in favour and 3 abstentions the opposition's nominee to succeed Tania, Zurab Achba, who had served as prosecutor in Gagra District until 2014.

=== Arbitration Court ===
On 16 July 2014, Parliament elected Fatima Kvitsinia Chairman of the Arbitration Court of Abkhazia.

=== Supreme Court ===
On 1 June 2015, Supreme Court Chairman Roman Mushba announced his resignation, co-inciding with the end of his current mandate. On 30 July, Parliament elected as new Chairman Zurab Agumava, who had previously served as Supreme Court Judge, Interior Minister, Security Service Head, Military Prosecutor and Acting Prosecutor General. In addition, it elected Oksana Pilia as Supreme Court Judge.

== Ombudsman ==
On 3 March 2007, Gueorgui Otyrba was appointed as the first Commissioner for Human Rights (Ombudsman), serving under the President of Abkhazia, by President Sergei Bagapsh.

On 11 February 2016, the People's Assembly adopted a law which instituted a new, independent office of Ombudsman. The Ombudsman is elected by the People's Assembly by a simple majority for a term of five years. Candidates may be nominated by a group measuring at least one third of the total number of deputies. The Ombudsman must be a citizen and a permanent resident of Abkhazia, between 35 and 65 years of age and having completed higher education, and may not have a criminal record. No person may fulfill more than two consecutive terms as Ombudsman.

Accordingly, on 4 May Otyrba was released as Ombudsman by President Raul Khajimba and on 22 November, the lawyer Dmitri Marshan was elected as the new Ombudsman by Parliament, with eighteen votes in favour, one against and one abstention, out of 28 deputies present, after having been nominated by a group of 26 deputies.

== See also ==
- Government of the Autonomous Republic of Abkhazia
- Politics of Abkhazia
