= Adgur Lushba =

Politician in Abkhazia

1st Minister for Taxes and Fees of Abkhazia
- In office 18 December 2002 – 25 February 2005
- Prime Minister: Gennady Gagulia; Raul Khajimba; Nodar Khashba
- Preceded by: Office created
- Succeeded by: Vakhtang Pipia

Head of the State Tax Service
- In office 28 May 2002 – 9 December 2002
- Prime Minister: Anri Jergenia
- Preceded by: Konstantin Ozgan
- Succeeded by: Office abolished

Minister for Economy of Abkhazia
- In office December 1999 – 28 May 2002
- Prime Minister: Viacheslav Tsugba; Anri Jergenia
- Preceded by: Beslan Kubrava
- Succeeded by: Beslan Kubrava

Personal details
- Born: August 29, 1963 (age 62) Gudauta, Abkhazian ASSR, Georgian SSR, Soviet Union

Adgur Lushba is a politician in Abkhazia. He is currently deputy Head of the Presidential Administration under Raul Khajimba. In the past, he has served as Minister for Economy and as Minister for Taxes and Fees in the Government of President Ardzinba.

== Early life and career ==
Lushba was born on 29 August 1963 in Gudauta. In 1984, he graduated from the Economics department of the Abkhazian State University. Between 1986 and 1992, Lushba worked in the Ministry for Commerce, and between April 1992 and January 1995 in the State Committee for the Management of State Property and Privatisation. In January 1995, Lushba became head of the Economical department of the Cabinet.

== Government Minister ==
In December 1999, following the re-election of President Vladislav Ardzinba and the appointment of Viacheslav Tsugba as prime minister, Lushba was appointed Minister for Economy. He initially kept his position after Tsugba was succeeded by Anri Jergenia, but on 28 May 2002 was transferred to the State Tax Service, succeeding Konstantin Ozgan who had been elected to the People's Assembly.

In November 2002, Jergenia was replaced as prime minister by Gennady Gagulia, who transformed the State Tax Service into a Ministry, and on 18 December, Lushba was appointed as the first Minister for Taxes and Fees. He remained in this post under Prime Ministers Raul Khajimba and Nodar Khashba, until the election of Sergei Bagapsh as president in 2005.

== Chamber of Commerce and Presidential Administration ==
In September 2007, Lushba became First Vice President of Abkhazia's Chamber of Commerce, under Gagulia.

On 7 June 2016, Lushba was appointed deputy Head of the Presidential Administration by President Raul Khajimba.

Political offices
Preceded by Beslan Kubrava	Minister for Economy of Abkhazia; 1999–2002	Succeeded by Beslan Kubrava
Preceded by Konstantin Ozgan	Minister for Taxes and Fees of Abkhazia; 2002–2005	Succeeded by Vakhtang Pipia
