= Abkhazia–Russia relations =

Bilateral diplomatic relations

- Abkhazia: Russia

Abkhazia–Russia relations is the bilateral relationship between the Republic of Abkhazia and the Russian Federation. Russia recognised Abkhazia on 26 August 2008, following the August 2008 Russo-Georgian War. Abkhazia and Russia established diplomatic relations on 9 September 2008.

== Background ==
=== Russian recognition of Abkhazia ===
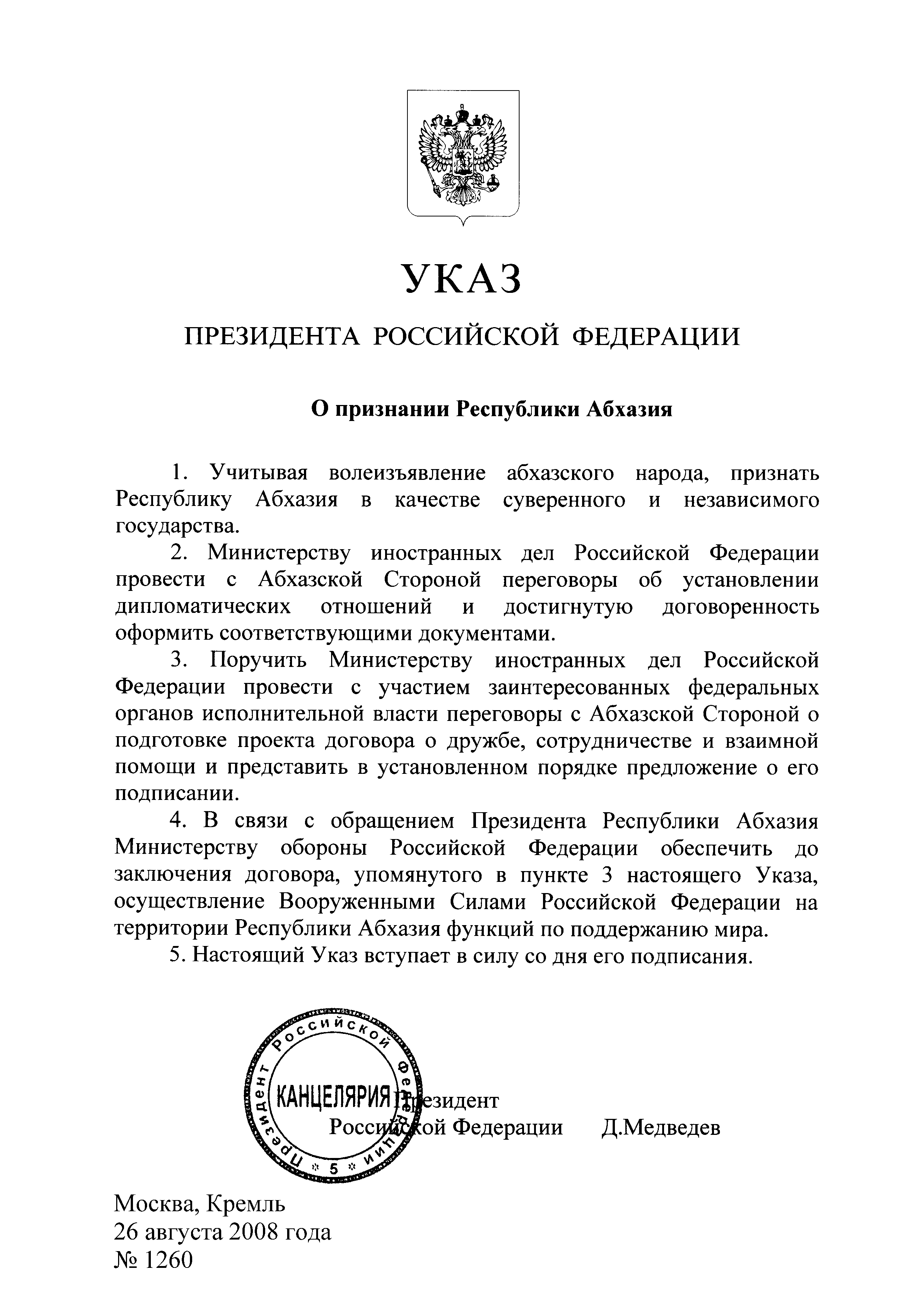
Presidential Decree No. 1260, dated 26 August 2008, by President Dmitry Medvedev, recognising the independence of Abkhazia

President Medvedev announcing that he has signed decrees recognising independence of Abkhazia and South Ossetia (in Russian) Transcript in English.

On 25 August 2008 the Federation Council and State Duma passed motions calling upon President Medvedev to recognise the independence of the two regions and to establish diplomatic relations with them. On 26 August 2008, President Medvedev signed decrees recognising the independence of Abkhazia and South Ossetia In his address to the Russian nation, Medvedev noted that he was guided by the provisions of the UN Charter, the 1970 Declaration on the Principles of International Law Governing Friendly Relations Between States, the CSCE Helsinki Final Act of 1975 and other fundamental international instruments in issuing the decree, and further stated, "(t)his is not an easy choice to make, but it represents the only possibility to save human lives."

The Russian recognition was condemned by the European Union, United States, NATO, and the Parliamentary Assembly of the Council of Europe, amongst others, with some calling for Russia to rescind its recognition.

As a result of the Russian recognition of Abkhazian and South Ossetian independence, Georgia severed diplomatic relations with Russia on 29 August 2008, and declared that it regards South Ossetia and Abkhazia as occupied territories.

== Bilateral relationship ==
=== Diplomatic ties ===
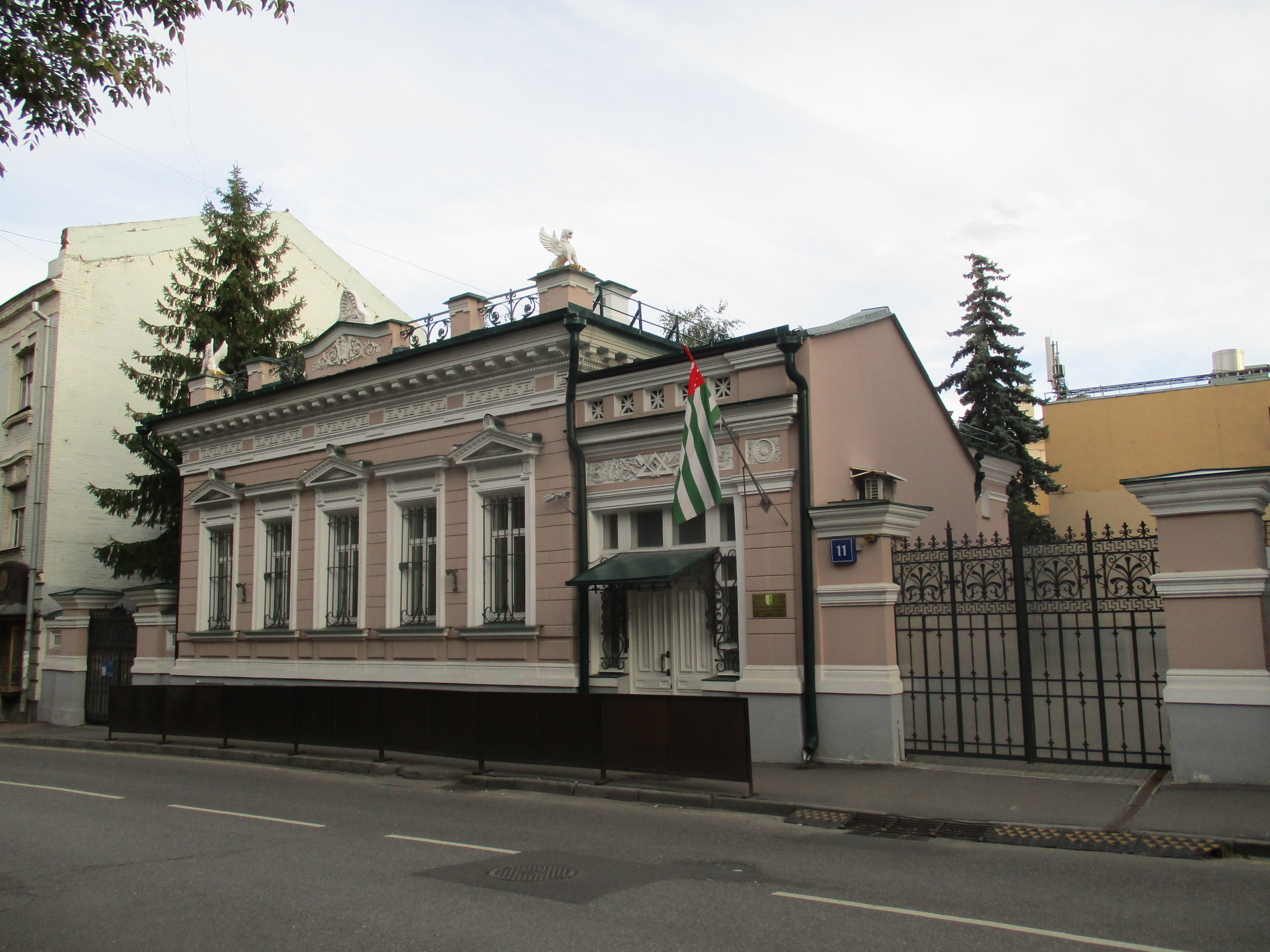
Abkhazian embassy in Moscow

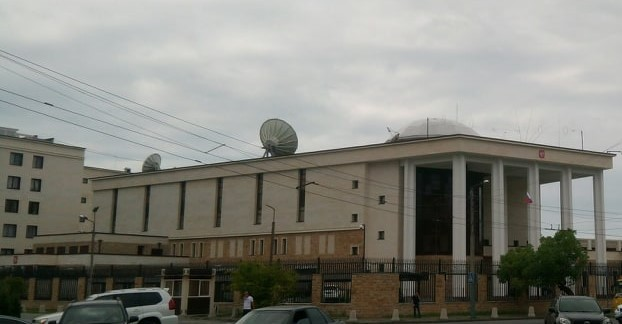
Russian embassy in Sukhumi

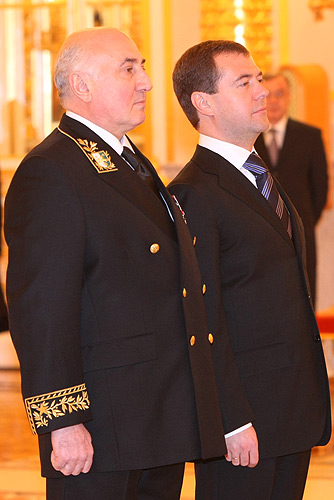
Igor Akhba, the first Abkhazian Ambassador to Russia, presents his Letters of Credence to President Medvedev on 16 January 2009.

Russia and Abkhazia established diplomatic relations at embassy level on 9 September 2008, when Russian Foreign Minister Sergey Lavrov and Abkhaz Minister of Foreign Affairs Sergei Shamba exchanged notes at the Russian Foreign Ministry in Moscow.

On 25 September 2008, President Medvedev appointed the first Russian Ambassador to Abkhazia, Semyon Grigoriyev, who presented his Letters of Credence to Abkhaz President Sergei Bagapsh on 16 December 2008. Igor Akhba, the Plenipotentiary Representative of the President of the Republic of Abkhazia to Russia was appointed by Sergei Bagapsh as Abkhazia's first ambassador to Russia on 14 November 2008. Akhba presented his credentials to Russian President Dmitry Medvedev on 16 January 2009.

Russian Prime Minister Vladimir Putin issued a directive to set up a Russian embassy in Abkhazia in 2009. On 1 May 2009, Russia's embassy to Abkhazia was opened in Sukhumi.

Russia plans on opening up a trade mission in Abkhazia in order to ease access to the local economy for Russian businesses.

== List of treaties and agreements ==
Signed:	Ratified by Abkhazia:	Ratified by Russia:	Treaty:	Notes:
30 April 2009			Cooperation agreement on the protection of state borders	
	8 May 2012		Agreement on the procedure of the pension schemes for Internal Affairs officials	
	8 May 2012		Cooperation agreement on disaster prevention and management	
12 August 2009	15 June 2012		Agreement to assist the Republic of Abkhazia in its socio-economic development	
17 February 2010		6 October 2011	Agreement on a joint Russian military base in Abkhazia	Valid for 49 years, automatically renewable for 15-year periods
26 April 2011	15 June 2012		Agreement on the establishment of informatory-cultural centres and the conditions governing their activities	
28 May 2012			Agreement on the trade of goods	Abolishes import duties on most products, immediately for Russia, from 1 January 2015 onwards for Abkhazia

== Resident diplomatic missions ==
- Abkhazia has an embassy in Moscow.
- Russia has an embassy in Sukhumi.

== See also ==
- Foreign relations of Abkhazia
- Foreign relations of Russia
- International recognition of Abkhazia and South Ossetia
