= Minister for Economy of Abkhazia =

Minister for Economy of the Republic of Abkhazia
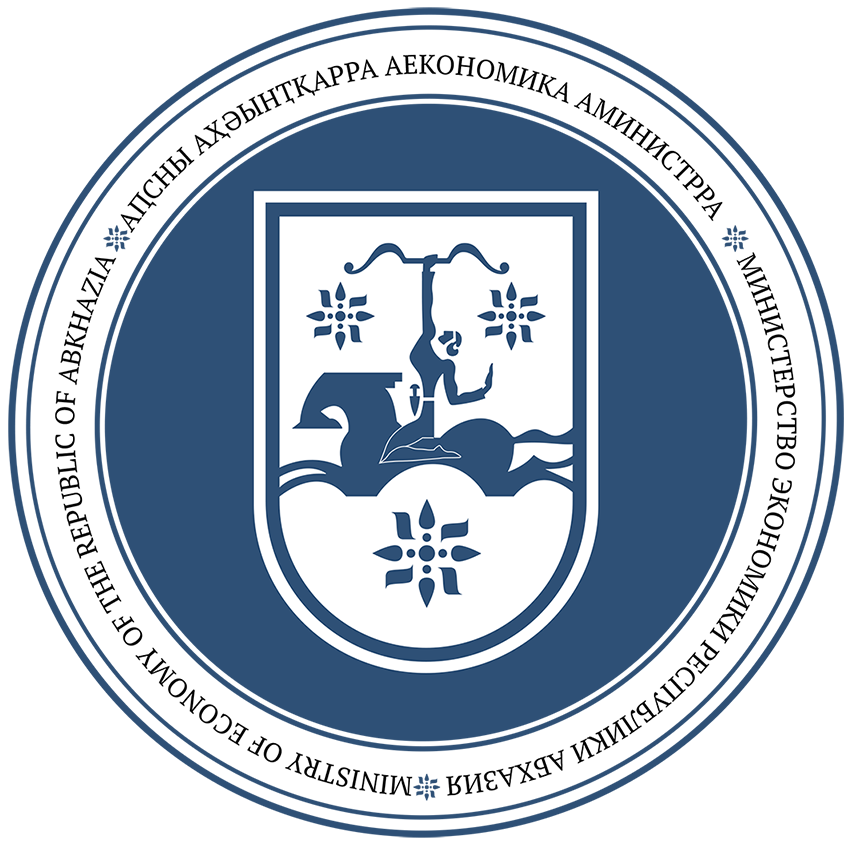

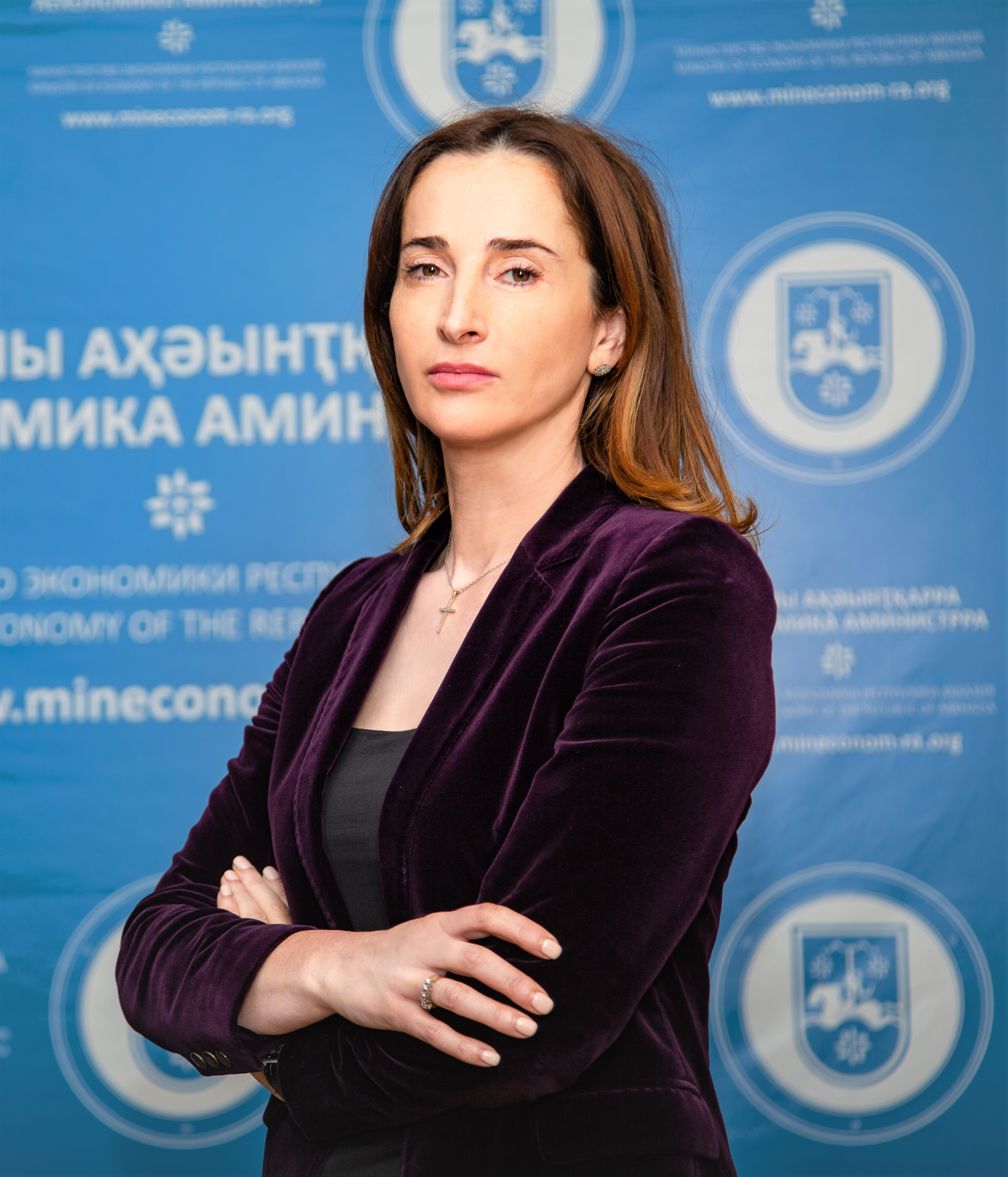
- Incumbent; Kristina Ozgan since 4 May 2020
- Appointer: President of Abkhazia
- Term length: no limit
- Inaugural holder: Daur Bargandzhiya
- Formation: 12 December 1993

The Minister for Economy (Abkhaz: Аҧсны Аҳәынҭқарра Аекономика аминистрра) is the minister responsible for the economy of the Republic of Abkhazia. It was created in 1993 after the 1992–1993 war between Abkhazia and Georgia.

== List of people to hold the office ==
No.	Portrait	Name	Term		
No.	Portrait	Name	Took office	Left office	Duration
1	Daur Bargandzhiya	Daur Bargandzhiya	12 December 1993	3 February 1995	1 year, 53 days
2	Konstantin Tuzhba	Konstantin Tuzhba	3 February 1995	7 May 1997	2 years, 93 days
3	Konstantin Ozgan	Konstantin Ozgan	7 May 1997	16 April 1998	344 days
4	Beslan Kubrava	Beslan Kubrava	16 April 1998	17 December 1999	1 year, 245 days
5	Adgur Lushba	Adgur Lushba	17 December 1999	25 May 2002	2 years, 159 days
(4)	Beslan Kubrava	Beslan Kubrava	25 May 2002	9 December 2002	198 days
6	Ruslan Ardzinba	Ruslan Ardzinba	9 December 2002	8 May 2003	150 days
(2)	Konstantin Tuzhba	Konstantin Tuzhba	8 May 2003	25 December 2005	2 years, 231 days
7	Kristina Ozgan	Kristina Ozgan	25 December 2005	27 October 2011	5 years, 306 days
8	David Iradyan	David Iradyan	27 October 2011	15 October 2014	2 years, 353 days
9	Nikolai Achba	Nikolai Achba	15 October 2014	8 April 2015	175 days
10	Adgur Ardzinba	Adgur Ardzinba	8 April 2015	4 May 2020	5 years, 26 days
11	Kristina Ozgan	Kristina Ozgan	4 May 2020	Incumbent	6 years, 126 days
