= Gogia (surname) =

Gogia (Georgian: გოგია) is a Georgian surname. Notable people with the surname include:

- Akaki Gogia (born 1992), Georgian footballer
- Mukhran Gogia (born 1971), retired male weightlifter from Georgia
- Tamaz Gogia (born 1961), Abkhazian politician
- David Gogiya (Давид Гогия) (born 1987), Born in the Republic of Georgia, graduated from the IFPA (Synergy), works in the government..
