= Vladimir Zantaria =

Abkhazian poet and politician (1953–2026)

- Владимир Занҭариа
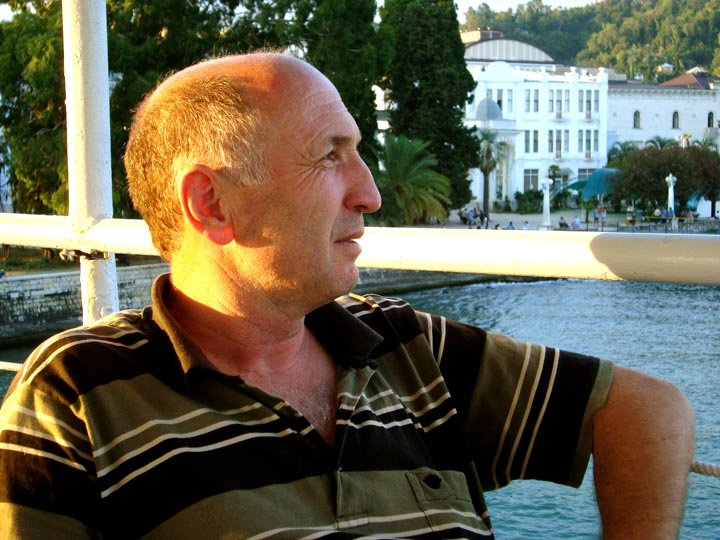
- Zantaria in 2010

Vice Premier of Abkhazia
- In office 19 July 2001 – 14 December 2004
- Prime Minister: Anri Jergenia; Gennadi Gagulia; Raul Khajimba
- Preceded by: Nuri Gezerdaa
- Succeeded by: Sergei Shamba

Minister for Culture
- In office 1999 – 19 July 2001
- Prime Minister: Viacheslav Tsugba
- Preceded by: Kesou Khagba
- Succeeded by: Leonid Enik

2nd Chairman of the Abkhazian State TV and Radio
- In office 1993–1994

Personal details
- Born: 27 September 1953 Tamishi, Abkhaz ASSR, Georgian SSR, Soviet Union
- Died: 21 March 2026 (aged 72)

Vladimir Konstantin-ipa Zantaria (Abkhaz: Владимир Константин-иԥа Занҭариа, Russian: Владимир Константинович Зантария, romanized: Vladimir Konstantinovich Zantariya; 27 September 1953 – 21 March 2026) was an Abkhaz poet and politician. From 1999 until 2004, he served first as Minister for Culture and then as Vice Premier in the Government of President Vladislav Ardzinba.

== Early life ==
Zantaria was born on 27 September 1953 in the village of Tamishi, Ochamchira District. In 1975, he graduated from the philological faculty of the Sukhumi State Pedagogical Institute.

== Political career ==
Zantaria was a member of the 1st convocation of the People's Assembly from 1992 to 1997. Between 1993 and 1994, he was Chairman of the State TV and Radio.

In 1999, following the re-election of President Vladislav Ardzinba, he became Minister for Culture in the cabinet of Prime Minister Viacheslav Tsugba. On 19 July 2001, he was appointed Vice Premier instead under Tsugba's successor Anri Jergenia. He was reappointed in the cabinets of Gennadi Gagulia and Raul Khajimba, serving until 14 December 2004.

== Death ==
Zantaria died on 21 March 2026, at the age of 72.
