= Juan Paredes =

Juan Paredes may refer to:

- Juan Paredes (boxer) (born 1953), Mexican boxer
- Juan Paredes (activist) (1954–1975), Basque separatist and nationalist
- Juan Ángel Paredes (born 1979), Paraguayan football striker
- Juan Paredes (footballer, born 1984), Guatemalan football goalkeeper
- Juan Carlos Paredes (born 1987), Ecuadorian football right-back
- Juan Vicente Paredes Torrealba (fl. 2013–1015), Venezuelan diplomat
