= Oleg Botsiev =

Ambassador of South Ossetia to Abkhazia (2013-)

Oleg Botsiev is the current ambassador of South Ossetia to Abkhazia. He was appointed to the position by President Leonid Tibilov on 15 April 2013. On 19 August, Botsiev presented his credentials to Abkhazian Foreign Minister Viacheslav Chirikba, and on 20 August, to President Alexander Ankvab. Previously, Botsiev had been the Minister for Labour and Social Security of Abkhazia from December 1999 onwards, and Chief of the Cabinet Staff from 8 May 2003 until in 2005 Vladislav Ardzinba was succeeded by Sergei Bagapsh as President of Abkhazia.

Botsiev was born on 26 March 1954 in Tkvarcheli.
