= Apsua TV =

Abkhazian television channel

Abkhazian Television Аԥсуа Телехәаԥшра (Abkhaz)
- Country: Abkhazia
- Broadcast area: Abkhazia
- Headquarters: Sukhumi, Abkhazia

Programming
- Picture format: H.264

Ownership
- Owner: Abkhazian State Television and Radio Broadcasting Company

History
- Launched: 6 November 1978; 47 years ago (as the National Television of Abkhaz ASSR)

Links
- Website: apsua.tv

Availability

Terrestrial
- Terrestrial: Channel 1

Streaming media
- apsua.tv: Apsua TV online

Apsua TV (Abkhazian Television) (Abkhaz: Аԥсуа Телехәаԥшра or Apsua Telehwapšra) is the state-owned television channel in Abkhazia. It broadcasts both in Abkhaz and Russian languages. Its headquarters are located in Sukhum.

== History ==
In the early 1970s, there were proposals for creating a television for Abkhaz population. Few years later, the committee to the State Council of Ministers of USSR Radio and Television, along with the Ministry of Communications Industry in USSR and the Ministry of Communications in USSR announced that a television organisation in Abkhaz ASSR was created. Three months were allocated for purchasing equipment and other stuff.

First transmissions started on 6 November 1978, at 7 PM, when a message in Abkhaz language appeared: Good evening, dear Abkhaz viewers!. Then, the evening programme continued with broadcasting concerts from local music groups. Color broadcasting arrived in Abkhazia in 1980.

=== Modern Abkhazia ===
On 10 September 1991, the State Committee for Television and Radio of the Abkhaz ASSR changed its name to Abkhaz State Television and Radio Company.

Currently, Apsua TV broadcasts programs in Russian and Abkhaz languages.
