= Nodar Pilia =

Abkhazian politician

Nodar Pilia was Minister of Culture of Abkhazia in the early 1990s.
