= Central Election Commission of Abkhazia =

Government body

The Central Election Commission of Abkhazia is the body responsible for conducting national elections and overseeing local elections in Abkhazia. It was first formed on 20 July 1991.

== Chairmen ==
The first chairman of the Central Election Commission was Viacheslav Tsugba, who held the post until he became Prime Minister in 1999.

On 11 October 2004, Sergei Smyr resigned during the height of the crisis following the Presidential election earlier that month. On 14 December, the newly formed Central Election Commission elected former Justice Minister Batal Tabagua as its chairman.

In 2016, Tabagua was not re-appointed to the Central Election Commission, and on 23 December, former State Privatisation Committee Chairman Tamaz Gogia was elected his successor during the first meeting of the CEC in its new composition.

#	Name	From	Until	President	Comments
1	Viacheslav Tsugba	20 July 1991	1999	none	_
1	Viacheslav Tsugba	20 July 1991	1999	Vladislav Ardzinba	_
2	Sergei Smyr	1999	11 October 2004	Vladislav Ardzinba	_
3	Batal Tabagua	14 December 2004	23 December 2016	Vladislav Ardzinba	_
3	Batal Tabagua	14 December 2004	23 December 2016	Sergei Bagapsh	_
3	Batal Tabagua	14 December 2004	23 December 2016	Alexander Ankvab	_
3	Batal Tabagua	14 December 2004	23 December 2016	Raul Khajimba	_
4	Tamaz Gogia	23 December 2016	Present	Raul Khajimba	_
