= Nodar Chanba =

Abkhazian politician (born 1955)

Nodar Chanba was Minister of Culture of Abkhazia in the early 1990s. He was born in 1955 in Gudauta.

During Perestroika, Chanba led the Union of Young Artists, which eventually became part of Aidgylara.
