= Abkhazian State Television and Radio Broadcasting Company =

Public broadcaster of Abkhazia

Abkhazian State Television and Radio Broadcasting Company Аԥснытәи аҳәынҭқарратә телерадиоеилахәыра
- Type: Broadcast radio, television and online
- Country: Abkhazia
- Owner: Public TV
- Launch date: 1978
- Official website: apsua.tv

The Abkhazian State Television and Radio Broadcasting Company (Abkhaz: Аԥснытәи аҳәынҭқарратә телерадиоеилахәыра, romanized: Apsnytwi ahwyntkarratw teleradioeilakhwyra) is Abkhazia's public television and radio broadcaster, founded in 1976. Its sole TV channel, Apsua TV, started broadcasting on 6 November 1978.

On 10 September 1991, the State Committee for Television and Radio was transformed into the Abkhazian State Television and Radio Company.

== List of General Directors ==
#	Name	Entered office	Left office	Comments
1	Shamil Pilia	1978	1993	
2	Vladimir Zantaria	1993	1994	
3	Guram Amkuab	1995	2003	First time
4	Ruslan Khashig	2003	October 13, 2004	
5	Guram Amkuab	October 13, 2004	October 14, 2011	Second time
–	Miron Kvaratskhelia	October 14, 2011	November 24, 2011	Acting
6	Alkhas Cholokua	November 24, 2011		
7	Emma Khojava	October 23, 2014	January 25, 2016	
8	Leonid Enik	January 29, 2016	November 4, 2016	
9	Tali Japua	November 4, 2016	Present	

== See also ==
- Media of Abkhazia
