= Tali Japua =

General Director of the Abkhazian State TV and Radio

9th General Director of the Abkhazian State TV and Radio
- Incumbent
- Assumed office 4 November 2016
- Preceded by: Leonid Enik

Minister for General, Secondary and Higher Education
- In office 13 November 2003 – 1 February 2005
- Prime Minister: Raul Khajimba; Nodar Khashba
- Preceded by: Aleko Gvaramia
- Succeeded by: Indira Vardania

Personal details
- Born: November 29, 1956 (age 69) Chlou
- Spouse: Aslan Kobakhia

Tali Japua is the current General Director of the Abkhazian State TV and Radio.

== Early life and career ==
Japua was born on 29 November 1956 in the village of Chlou, Ochamchira District. In 1977, she graduated from the philology faculty of the Sukhumi State Pedagogical Institute. From 1987 until 1990, she taught at the department for Abkhazian literature of the Abkhazian State University. From 1990 onwards, Japua worked as research fellow and senior researcher at the Abkhazian Institute of History, Language and Literature.

== Member of Parliament ==
In the November 1996 elections, Japua successfully ran for a seat of the 2nd convocation of the People's Assembly of Abkhazia. She served one term, until 2002.

== Minister for Education ==
In 2001, Japua became head of the National Foundation for the Development of the Abkhaz Language. On 13 November 2003, she was appointed Minister for General, Secondary and Higher Education in the cabinet of Prime Minister Raul Khajimba, after Abkhazian State University Rector Aleko Gvaramia had resigned from the post.

Japua was re-appointed Education Minister in the cabinet of Prime Minister Nodar Khashba, but she resigned on 1 February 2005, less than two weeks before the inauguration of newly elected President Sergei Bagapsh.

== State TV and Radio General Director ==
On 4 November 2016, Japua was appointed the new General Director of the Abkhazian State TV and Radio, succeeding Leonid Enik, who wanted to resign after less than a year due to ill health. Her appointment was criticised with the question whether she could be sufficiently independent as long as Japua's husband Aslan Kobakhia held the post of Vice Premier and Interior Minister.
