= Nikolai Kiut =

Abkhazian politician (1910–1986)

Nikolai Kiut was Minister of Culture of the Abkhazian ASSR from 1967 to 1973. Kiut was born in 1910 into a peasant family in the village Kindgi in Ochamchira District and died in 1986.
