= Leonid Enik =

Abkhazian politician

8th General Director of the Abkhazian State TV and Radio
- In office 29 January 2016 – 4 November 2016
- Preceded by: Emma Khojava
- Succeeded by: Tali Japua

Minister for Culture
- In office 2001 – 10 March 2005
- Prime Minister: Anri Jergenia; Gennadi Gagulia; Raul Khajimba; Nodar Khashba
- Preceded by: Vladimir Zantaria
- Succeeded by: Nugzar Logua

Personal details
- Born: 1960 (age 65–66) Mgudzurkhva

Leonid Enik was Minister for Culture of Abkhazia from 2001 until 10 March 2005. He was born in 1960 in the village of Mgudzurkhva in Gudauta District.

On 29 January 2016, Leonid Enik was appointed the new General Director of the Abkhazian State TV and Radio, succeeding Emma Khojava, who had been dismissed, upon her own request, on 25 January.

During his tenure, Enik was criticised by other journalists, in particular his predecessor Khojava. In October, he announced that he wanted to resign due to ill health, and on 4 November he was replaced by former Education Minister Tali Japua.
