= Aleksei Argun =

Abkhazian politician

Personal details
- Born: April 1937 Tkvarcheli, Abkhazia
- Died: 1 July 2008 (aged 71) Sukhumi, Abkhazia

Aleksei Khutovich Argun (Russian: Алексей Хутович Аргун; April 1937 – 1 July 2008) was Minister of Culture of the Abkhazian ASSR from 1971 or 1973 to 1980.
