= Tamaz Gogia =

Abkhazian politician (born 1961)

4th Chairman of the Central Election Commission
- Incumbent
- Assumed office 23 December 2016
- Preceded by: Batal Tabagua

Head of Gulripshi District
- In office 13 November 2003 – 1 February 2005
- President: Vladislav Ardzinba
- Preceded by: Adgur Kharazia
- Succeeded by: Aslan Baratelia

1st Chairman of the State Committee for State Property and Privatisation
- In office March 1998 – 18 December 2002
- Prime Minister: Sergei Bagapsh; Viacheslav Tsugba; Anri Jergenia
- Succeeded by: Astamur Appba

Personal details
- Born: July 5, 1961 (age 64) Tkvarcheli

Tamaz Gogia is the current Chairman of the Central Election Commission of Abkhazia.

== Early life ==
Gogia was born on 5 July 1961 in Tkvarcheli and graduated from the Krasnoyarsk Technical University.

== Career ==
From October 1993 until December 1998, Gogia served as Deputy Head of Ochamchira District.

In March 1998, he was appointed as the first Chairman of the newly created State Committee for State Property Management and Privatisation by President Vladislav Ardzinba. Gogia served in this post under Prime Ministers Sergei Bagapsh, Viacheslav Tsugba and Anri Jergenia, but was not in re-appointed in December 2002 in the cabinet of Gennadi Gagulia.

On 16 June 2003, President Ardzinba appointed Gogia as Administration Head of Gulripshi District. In the beginning of 2004, district officials stayed away from work in protest of what they perceived as rudeness from Gogia. In response, Gogia applied for resignation which President Ardzinba granted on 9 February, appointing First Deputy Head Aslan Baratelia in his stead.

Gogia became a member of the Central Election Commission in 2004, but resigned during the Mandarin Revolution following on the October 2004 Presidential election.

In 2016, Gogia was once more appointed to the Central Election Commission. On 23 December, he was elected chairman during the first meeting of the CEC in its new composition (outgoing chairman Batal Tabagua had not been re-appointed to the CEC).
