= Apollon Shinkuba =

Retired politician of Abkhazia

Chairman of the Council of Elders of Abkhazia
- Incumbent
- Assumed office 15 July 2016
- Preceded by: Konstantin Ozgan

Chairman of the State Committee for Repatriation of Abkhazia
- In office 2000 – 27 June 2001
- Prime Minister: Viacheslav Tsugba
- Preceded by: Givi Dopua
- Succeeded by: Givi Dopua

Personal details
- Born: April 7, 1946 (age 80) Tkhin, Ochamchira District

Apollon Shinkuba is a retired politician from Abkhazia and the current Chairman of the Council of Elders of Abkhazia.

== Early life and career ==
Apollon Shinkuba was born on 7 April 1946 in the village of Tkhin, Ochamchira District. He graduated from the philological faculty of the Sukhumi Pedagogical Institute in 1975. Between 1994 and 1997, Shinkuba served as deputy Chief of Staff of the Abkhazian Military. Between 2000 and 2001, he was Chairman of the State Committee for Repatriation. Shinkuba retired from the army in 2007 with the rank of Colonel.

== Chairman of the Council of Elders ==
Shinkuba was unanimously elected Chairman of the Council of Elders on 15 July 2016, following the death in March of his predecessor Konstantin Ozgan.

Political offices
| Preceded by Givi Dopua | Chairman of the State Committee for Repatriation of Abkhazia; 2000–2001 | Succeeded by Givi Dopua |
| Preceded by Konstantin Ozgan | Chairman of the Council of Elders of Abkhazia; 2016–present | Succeeded by Incumbent |
