= Vladimir Kvarchelia =

Abkhazian politician (1919–1985)

Vladimir Dzhgunatovich Kvarchelia (1919 – April 22, 1985) was Minister of Culture of the Abkhaz ASSR from October 1954 until March 1967. Kvarchelia was born in 1919 in the village of Achandara in Gudauta District and died on 22 April 1985.
