= Abkhaz Institute for Humanitarian Studies =

Abkhaz Research Institute

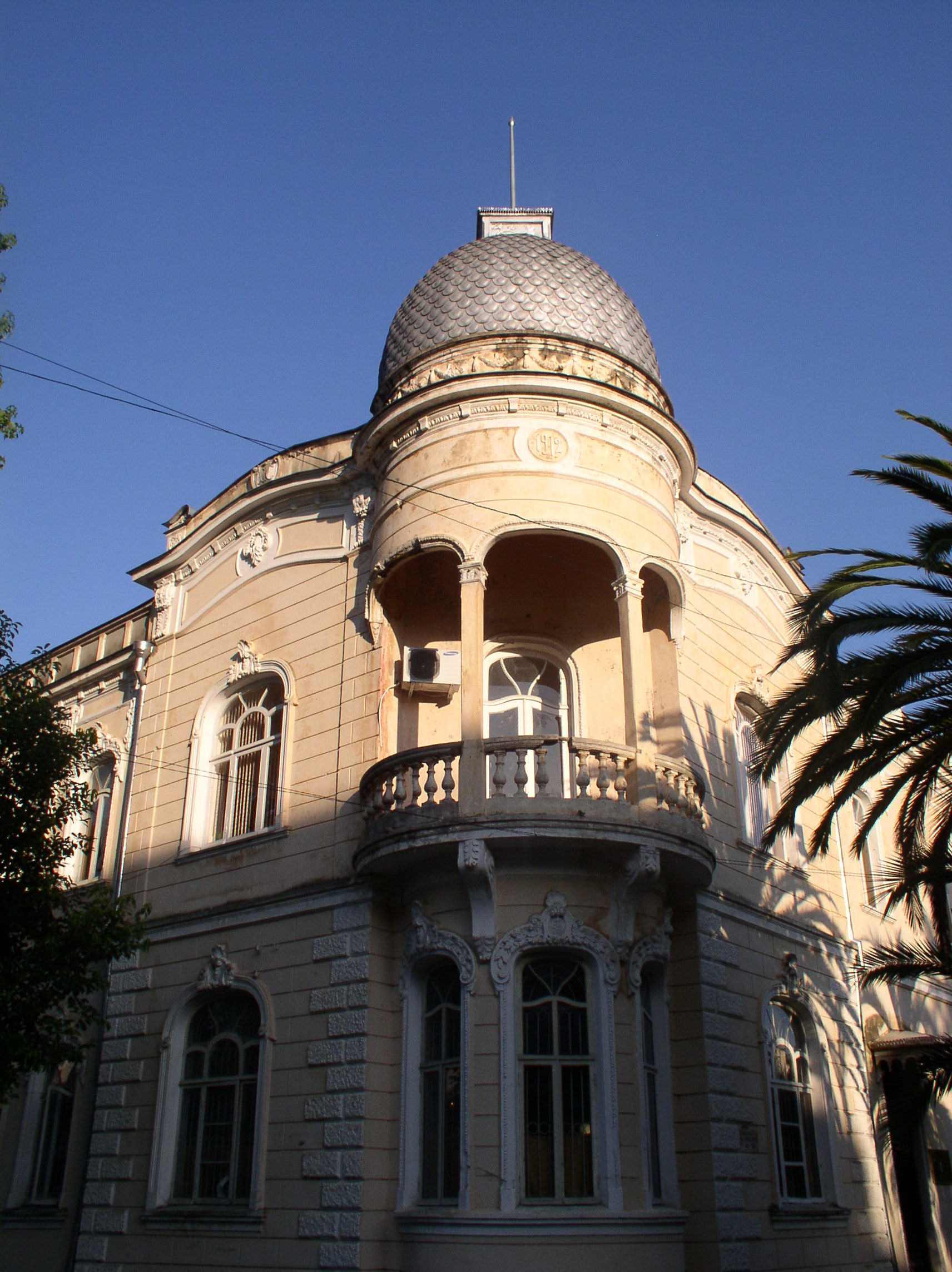
- Other name: D. I. Gulia Institute of Abkhaz Studies
- Established: 1925
- Focus: Abkhazian Culture
- Location: Sukhumi
- Coordinates: 43°00′19″N 41°01′15″E
- Interactive map of Abkhaz Institute for Humanitarian Studies
- Website: abigi.org

The Abkhaz Institute for Humanitarian Studies (Also known as the D. I. Galia Institute of Abkhaz Studies, Abkhaz: Д. И. Гәлиа ихьӡ зху Аԥсуаҭҵааратә институт) is a research institution engaged on Abkhazian Culture. It is part of the Academy of Sciences of Abkhazia. It is considered the only center for Abkhaz studies in the world.

== History ==
The institute was first formed in 1925 as the Academy of Abkhaz Language and Literature, on the initiative of Nikolai Marr. In 1930, the People's Commissariat of Education of Abkhazia transformed it into the Research Institute of Abkhaz Language and Literature. 1 year later, it was merged with the Abkhaz Scientific Society, forming the Abkhaz Research Institute of Local History. In 1935, the institute became part of the Georgian branch of the USSR academy of science. In 1960, the institute received the name of Abkhaz writer Dmitry Iosif-ipa Gulia. During the Georgian-Abkhaz War between 1992 and 1993, many of the institute's staff took part in the conflict, and seven employees of the institute were awarded the title of Hero of Abkhazia. In 1992, the Institute building was burnt down, along with its scientific library containing multiple Abkhaz History and Lexical publications. After the end of the war, the institute was restored.

== See also ==
- Dmitry Gulia
