= Nuri Gezerdaa =

Abkhazian politician (1959–2016)

Nuri Gezerdaa (19 June 1959 – 13 April 2016) was an Abkhaz politician.

== Early life and education ==
Gezerdaa was born on 19 June 1959 in Gudauta and graduated from school no. 1 there. In 1980, he graduated from the biological and geographical faculty of the Abkhazian State University. He went to the higher party school in Baku in 1985 and upon his graduation two years later became a senior lecturer at the Department of Philosophy. In 1988 he entered the graduate school of the Academy of Social Sciences of the Central Committee of the Communist Party of the Soviet Union, where he defended his PhD thesis in 1991.

== Political career ==
In January 1993, Gezerdaa was appointed deputy chairman of the State Committee for Repatriation. Between 1995 and 1997, he was first deputy head of the Gudauta District. In 1997, he was appointed Vice Premier by President Vladislav Ardzinba. When Anri Jergenia became Prime Minister in 2001, Gezerdaa was not re-appointed. On 19 July 2001, culture minister Vladimir Zantaria was appointed as his successor.

== Death ==
Gezerdaa died on 13 April 2016 after a long illness.
