= Hugo José García Hernández =

Venezuelan diplomat

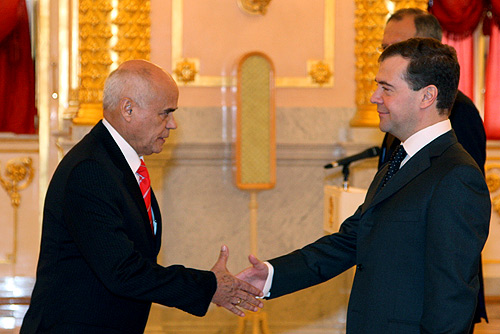
García Hernández presenting his credentials to Dmitry Medvedev in February 2009.

Hugo José García Hernández is a Venezuelan diplomat, a former ambassador of Venezuela to Russia and the first ambassador of Venezuela to Abkhazia.

García Hernández presented his credentials to Russian president Dmitry Medvedev on 27 February 2009. On 12 July 2010, he presented his credentials to President of Abkhazia Sergei Bagapsh as Venezuela's first ambassador to Abkhazia.
