= Viacheslav Chirikba =

Abkhazian linguist and politician

8th Minister for Foreign Affairs
- In office 11 October 2011 – 20 September 2016
- Prime Minister: Leonid Lakerbaia; Beslan Butba; Artur Mikvabia
- Preceded by: Maxim Gvinjia
- Succeeded by: Daur Kove

Personal details
- Born: 17 March 1959 (age 67) Gagra, Abkhaz Autonomous Soviet Socialist Republic, Georgian SSR, Soviet Union
- Party: Independent
- Education: University of Kharkiv; Russian Academy of Sciences; Leiden University
- Website: Academic website

Viacheslav Chirikba is a linguist and politician from Abkhazia. He was Minister for Foreign Affairs of Abkhazia between 2011 and 2016.

== Personal life ==
Chirikba was born on 17 March 1959 in Gagra. From 1966 until 1976, he attended School No.5 in Gagra. Chirikba is married and has three sons.

== Academic career ==
- 1977 – 1982 Student of Foreign Languages Department, V.N. Karazin Kharkov State University.
  - Diploma Work "Literary Paradox in the Works of George Bernard Shaw, O. Wilde and W. Shakespeare".
  - Supervisor: I.V. Gavrilchenko.
- 1982 – 1986 Postgraduate Student of the Institute of Linguistics, USSR Academy of Sciences.
  - Candidate's Dissertation "System of Whistling and Hissing Sounds in Abkhaz-Adyghe Languages".
  - Supervisor: Prof. Dr. M.A. Kumakhov.
- 1986 – 1991 Research Fellow at the Department of Caucasian Languages of the Institute of Linguistics, USSR Academy of Sciences.
- 1991 – 1996 Doctoral Candidate at the Institute for Descriptive and Comparative Linguistics, Leiden University, Netherlands. In 1996 he defended the doctoral thesis "Common West Caucasian. The Reconstruction of its Phonological System and Parts of its Lexicon and Morphology". Supervisors: Prof. Dr. F.kortlandt, Dr. R. Smeets.
- 1996 – 1997 Invited Researcher at the Institute of International Relations "Clingendael", The Hague, Netherlands. Research topic: "Abkhaz-Georgian Conflict".
- 2000 – 2004 Postdoctoral Research Project «Grammar of Sadz Abkhaz », Lecturer of Caucasian Languages at the Institute for Descriptive and Comparative Linguistics, Leiden University, Netherlands.
  - Courses taught: Introduction to Caucasian Linguistics; Abkhaz Grammar; Georgian Grammar.
- 2005 – 2006 Lecturer of Caucasian Languages, Department of Assyriology, Leiden University, Leiden, Netherlands.
  - Course taught: Abkhaz Grammar.
- 2007 – Head of Political Science and Conflictology Department at D.I. Gulia Abkhaz Institute of Humanitarian Studies.
- 2007 – Lecturer at the Department of the Abkhaz Language, Abkhaz State University.
  - Courses taught: Introduction to the Caucasian Linguistics; Grammar of the Ubykh Language.
- 2010 – 2013 Lecturer at the Department of History and Theory of International Relations, Abkhaz State University.
  - Course taught: Abkhazia in the Modern World (Geopolitics).
  - Member of the Abkhazian Academy of Sciences.

== Journals and academic organisations ==
Editorial positions:

- 1989 – 1990 Editor of "Alashara" Newspaper of the Abkhaz Society "Nartaa", Moscow.
- 1994 – 1995 Publisher and Co-editor of "Caucasus Review", Leiden, Netherlands.
- 1998 – 2001 Editor of Electronic "Abkhaz Bulletin", The Hague, Netherlands.

Affiliations:

- Member of European Society of Caucasus Researchers (Societas Caucasologica Europaea).
- Member of the Association for the Study of Language in Prehistory (The Association For The Study Of Language In Prehistory).
- Member of the SOCIETAS LINGUISTICA EUROPAEA.

== Diplomatic and political career ==
- 1993 – 1994 Member of the Abkhaz Delegation at the Georgian-Abkhaz Negotiations under the UN Aegis in Geneva.
- 1993 – 1998 Plenipotentiary Representative of the Republic of Abkhazia to the Countries of Western Europe.
- 1998 – 2007 Ambassador Extraordinary and Plenipotentiary of the Republic of Abkhazia to the Countries of Western Europe.
- 2005 – Member of the executive board of Unrepresented Nations and Peoples Organization (UNPO).
- 2007 – 2008 Foreign Policy Adviser of the President of the Republic of Abkhazia.
- 2008 – Head of Delegation of the Republic of Abkhazia at the International Geneva Discussions.

On 11 October 2011, Chirikba was appointed Minister for Foreign Affairs by newly elected President Alexander Ankvab. On 17 October 2014, Chirikba was one of few government members to be re-appointed in the cabinet of Prime Minister Beslan Butba following the May 2014 Revolution and subsequent election of Raul Khajimba as president. Chirikba was again re-appointed under Prime Minister Artur Mikvabia, but on 20 September 2016, after the appointment of Beslan Bartsits as Prime Minister, he released a statement in which he announced his resignation because he was unable to continue in his post under the current circumstances. On 4 October Chirikba's successor Daur Kove was appointed.

Vice Chairman of the Committee on the Implementation of the State Program of the Abkhaz Language Development.

He is the founder and chairman of Humanitarian Fund "International Centre for Information and Documentation about Abkhazia".

== Main publications ==
- Aspects of Phonological Typology. Moscow: Nauka, 1991, 143 p.
- Common West Caucasian: The Reconstruction of its Phonological System and Parts of its Lexicon and Morphology. Leiden: CNWS Publications, 1996, 452 pp.
- A Dictionary of Common Abkhaz. Leiden, 1996, 126 pp.
- Abkhaz – Languages of the World/Materials 119. München: Lincom Europa, 2003, 92 pp.
- Reconstructing Proto-West Caucasian: From North Caucasian to West Caucasian via "Chinese"? Chirikba, ??, 27 pp.
- Development of the Abkhaz language in the condition of a multi-ethnic society (Challenges and Prospects). Sukhum, 2009, 53 pp.
- The International Legal Status of the Republic of Abkhazia. Sukhum, 2013, 88 pp.
- The Mystery of Caterina: Who Was the Mother of Leonardo da Vinci?. St. Petersburg: Piter, 155 pp. ISBN 978-5-4461-0832-9
- Unified Abkhaz-Abaza Alphabet on the Latin Graphic Basis: A Project. Sukhum 2019.

Political offices
Preceded by Maxim Gvinjia	Minister for Foreign Affairs; 2011–2016	Succeeded by Daur Kove
