= Maxim Gvinjia =

Abkhazian politician (born 1976)

Maxim Gvinjia Максим Ӷәынџьиа მაქსიმ ღვინჯია

7th Minister for Foreign Affairs of Abkhazia
- In office 26 February 2010 – 11 October 2011
- President: Sergei Bagapsh; Alexander Ankvab
- Prime Minister: Sergei Shamba
- Preceded by: Sergei Shamba
- Succeeded by: Viacheslav Chirikba

Personal details
- Born: 13 March 1976 (age 50) Sukhumi
- Education: Gorlovsky State Institute for Foreign Languages

Maxim Gvinjia (Abkhaz: Максим Ӷәынџьиа, Georgian: მაქსიმ ღვინჯია) is the former Minister of Foreign Affairs of Abkhazia. Before he was appointed on 26 February 2010 to replace Sergei Shamba, Gvinjia had served as Deputy Minister for Foreign Affairs since 1 March 2004.

== Early life and career ==
Gvinjia was born on 13 March 1976 in Sukhumi. In 1998, he graduated from the Gorlovsky State Institute for Foreign Languages in Ukraine. Gvinjia is a member of the Abkhazian Committee to Ban Land Mines and has written a number of papers on the subject.

In 2014, Éric Baudelaire directed a documentary film, Letters to Max, based on a correspondence with Gvinjia, to whom Baudelaire sent a series of letters from Paris to test whether the French postal system would deliver mail to a state it doesn't recognize. Gvinjia received many of the letters, and responded with voice recordings that became the voiceover for the film.
