= Daur Kove =

Abkhazian politician (born 1979)

- Даур Ақаҩба (Abkhaz); Даур Кове (Russian)

9th Minister for Foreign Affairs
- In office 4 October 2016 – 18 November 2021
- Prime Minister: Beslan Bartsits
- Preceded by: Viacheslav Chirikba
- Succeeded by: Inal Ardzinba

Head of the Cabinet Office
- In office 9 September 2010 – 20 October 2011
- Prime Minister: Sergei Shamba
- Preceded by: Zurab Adleiba
- Succeeded by: Marina Ladaria

Personal details
- Born: 15 March 1979 (age 47) Sukhumi, Abkhaz Autonomous Soviet Socialist Republic, Soviet Union
- Education: Bashkir State University

Daur Vadimovich Kove (Abkhaz: Даур Вадим-иҧа Ақаҩба, Russian: Даур Вадимович Кове; born 15 March 1979) was the Minister for Foreign Affairs of Abkhazia from 2016 until 2021.

== Early life ==
Kove was born on 15 March 1979 in Sukhumi. In 2000, he graduated in jurisprudence from the Bashkir State University.

== Career ==
From 1995 until 2000, Kove was assistant to the Representation of Abkhazia in the Republic of Bashkortostan, and from 2000 until 2009, plenipotentiary representative.

In 2005, Kove additionally became head of the International Department of the Foreign Ministry. In 2006, he was appointed Deputy Minister. On 9 September 2010, Kobe was appointed Head of the Cabinet Office under Prime Minister Sergei Shamba, to succeed Zurab Adleiba who had been appointed Chairman of the State Repatriation Committee. A year later, Kove was not re-appointed under Prime Minister Leonid Lakerbaia.

In 2011, Kove became teacher in international law at the Sukhumi Open Institute. From June to November 2012, he was head of the legal department of the Office for Emergency Situations and from 2013 until 2014, advisor to the head of the Office for Emergency Situations. Between 2012 and 2014, Kove additionally served as Deputy Director of the Abkhazian branch of the Institute for Eurasian Studies. In November 2013, Kove became advisor to the Speaker of the People's Assembly.

In November 2014, following the election of President Raul Khajimba, Kove was appointed head of the Presidential Protocol Office. On 4 October 2016, Kove was appointed Foreign Minister to succeed Viacheslav Chirikba. In November 2021, he was replaced by Inal Ardzinba.

== See also ==
- List of foreign ministers in 2017
- List of current foreign ministers

Political offices
Preceded by Viacheslav Chirikba	Minister for Foreign Affairs; 2016–2021	Succeeded by Inal Ardzinba
