= Dmitri Marshan =

Abkhazian politician

2nd Commissioner for Human Rights of Abkhazia
- Incumbent
- Assumed office 22 November 2016
- Preceded by: Gueorgui Otyrba

Personal details
- Born: 1980 (age 45–46)
- Education: Adyghe State University; Rostov State University

Dmitri Marshan (born 1980) is the Commissioner for Human Rights (Ombudsman) of Abkhazia.

== Early life ==
Marshan was born in 1980. In 2002, he graduated from the Law Faculty of the Adyghe State University. Between January and December 2003, Marshan served as a conscript in the Abkhazian army. In 2006, Marshan completed the graduate school of the Department of State (Constitutional) Law of the Rostov State University.

== Career ==
Between 2006 and 2009, Marshan lectured at the Law Faculty of the Rostov State University, renamed into Southern Federal University. In 2008, he defended his PhD thesis. In 2010, he became assistant to Commissioner for Human Rights under the President of Abkhazia Gueorgui Otyrba.

On 11 February 2016, the People's Assembly adopted a law which instituted a new, independent office of Ombudsman, elected by Parliament. On 22 November, Marshan was elected as the new Ombudsman with eighteen votes in favour, one against and one abstention, out of 28 deputies present, after having been nominated by a group of 26 deputies.
