= Igor Akhba =

Abkhaz diplomat and politician (1949–2026)

- Игор Ахба (Abkhaz); Игорь Ахба (Russian)
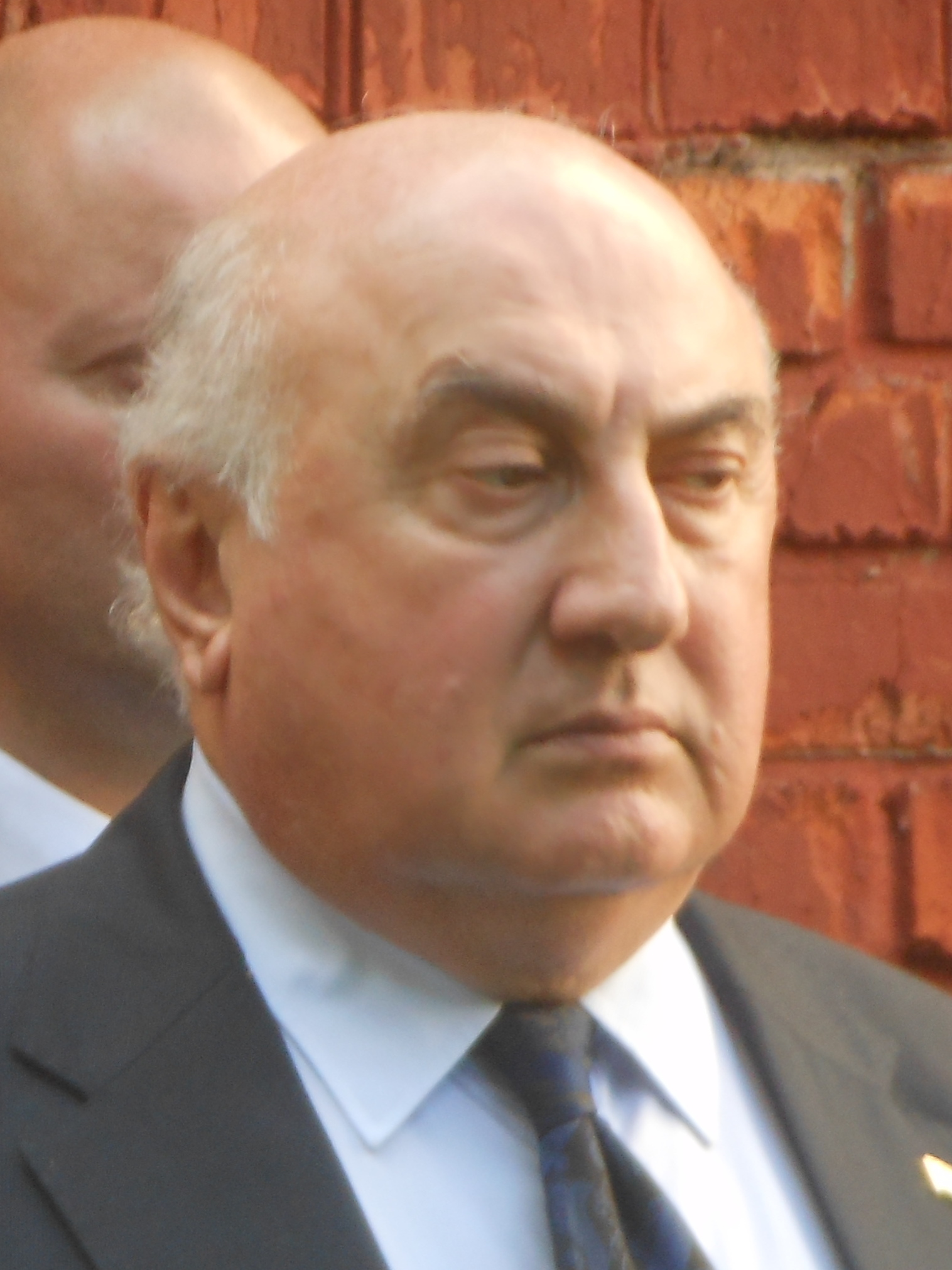
- Akhba in 2016

1st Abkhaz Special Representative for Eurasian integration
- In office 16 December 2021 – 18 August 2026

1st Ambassador of Abkhazia to Russia
- In office 10 December 2008 – 16 December 2021
- Succeeded by: Alkhas Kvitsinia

7th Minister for Foreign Affairs of Abkhazia
- In office 28 July 2004 – 14 December 2004
- Preceded by: Gueorgui Otyrba
- Succeeded by: Sergei Shamba

Personal details
- Born: 5 February 1949 Sukhumi, Abkhazian ASSR, Georgian SSR, Soviet Union
- Died: 18 August 2026 (aged 77)

Igor Muratovich Akhba (Abkhaz: Игор Мурат-иԥа Ахба; Georgian: იგორ ახბა; Russian: Игорь Муратович Ахба; 5 February 1949 – 18 August 2026) was an Abkhaz diplomat and politician. From 2008 until 2021, he was the first ambassador of the Republic of Abkhazia to the Russian Federation, and in 2004 he was for a short time the Minister for Foreign Affairs of his nation.

== Early life and career ==
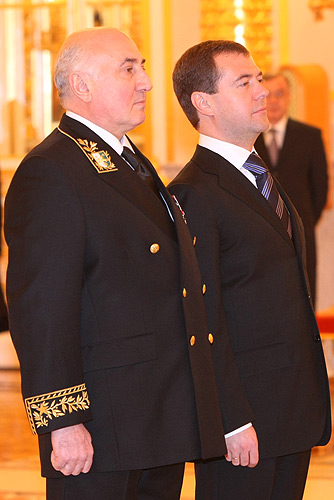
Akhba with President of Russia Dmitry Medvedev at the ceremony for the presentation of ambassadorial Letters of Credence

Igor Akhba was born on 5 February 1949 in Sukhumi, in what was then the Abkhazian ASSR. In 1972 he graduated from the faculty of law of the Moscow State University. In 1975 Akhba obtained a degree in Public and International Law from the Post-graduate Institute of State and Law of the USSR Academy of Sciences. From 1976 until 1989 Akhba worked as a research fellow with the V. I. Lenin State Library of the USSR. From 1989 until 1992 he was an assistant in the Supreme Soviet of the Soviet Union.

== Diplomatic and political career ==
In 1992, Igor Akhba was named presidential plenipotentiary to Russia, a post he has held for a long time. On 28 July 2004, Akhba was temporarily appointed Minister for Foreign Affairs of Abkhazia by outgoing President Vladislav Ardzinba. On 14 December 2004, shortly after the height of the crisis following the 2004 presidential election, he was replaced by Sergei Shamba and returned to his posting in Moscow.

On 26 August 2008 the Republic of Abkhazia was formally recognised as independent by the Russian Federation, on 9 September the two states established diplomatic relations and on 14 November Igor Akhba was appointed the first Abkhazian ambassador to Russia. On 10 December 2008 he presented his credentials to Grigory Karasin, the State Secretary and Deputy Minister of Foreign Affairs of the Russian Federation, and presented his Letter of Credence to President of Russia Dmitry Medvedev on 16 January 2009.

== Personal life and death ==
Akhba was married and had a child. He died on 18 August 2026, at the age of 77.

== Sources ==
- Лакоба, Станислав (2004). "Абхазия после двух империй XIX—XXI вв." // 21st Century COE Program Slavic Eurasian Studies—No. 5. Sapporo: Slavic Research Center, Hokudai University.

Political offices
Preceded by Gueorgui Otyrba	Minister for Foreign Affairs of Abkhazia; 28 July – 14 December 2004	Succeeded by Sergei Shamba
Diplomatic posts
Preceded by New title	Ambassador of Abkhazia to Russia; 14 November 2008 – 16 December 2021	Succeeded by Alhas Kvitsinia
