= Lev Kvitsinia =

Abkhazian politician

Lev Kvitsinia is the current Minister for Emergency Situations of Abkhazia. Kvitsinia was Head of the Office for Emergency Situations when on 21 July 2014, following the May 2014 Revolution, it was transformed into a full-fledged Ministry and Kvitsinia appointed as acting Minister by acting President Valeri Bganba. on 17 October 2014, Kvitsinia was permanently appointed by newly elected President Raul Khajimba.
