= Minister for Foreign Affairs of Abkhazia =

Government official

Minister for Foreign Affairs of the Republic of Abkhazia
- Incumbent; Oleg Bartsits since 18 April 2025
- Appointer: President of Abkhazia
- Term length: No fixed term
- Formation: 17 May 1993
- Website: http://mfaapsny.org/en/

The office of Minister for Foreign Affairs of the Republic of Abkhazia was created on 17 May 1993, during the 1992–1993 war with Georgia. Empirical data nevertheless show that Abkhazia's Foreign Ministry also enacts (mostly low-level) diplomatic relations, such as the sending of diplomatic notes, with various countries across the world, including Nauru, Vanuatu, Venezuela, Nicaragua, and Syria. It is also active in managing relations with other post-Soviet de facto states such as South Ossetia, Transnistria, and the Lugansk People's Republic.

== History ==
=== Government of President Ardzinba ===
On 30 April 1997, former Aidgylara Chairman Sergei Shamba was appointed Foreign Minister instead of Konstantin Ozgan, who had been appointed First Vice Premier, succeeding Sergei Bagapsh, who had been appointed Prime Minister on 29 April.

Shamba remained Foreign Minister until he resigned on 15 June 2004 along with First Vice Premier Astamur Tarba (who eventually stayed on) and Security Service Chairman Givi Agrba following the murder of opposition politician Garri Aiba. Shamba was temporarily replaced by his deputy Gueorgui Otyrba on 18 July, and permanently by Abkhazia's representative in Moscow Igor Akhba on 28 July. On 14 December 2004, following the Tangerine Revolution but while Vladislav Ardzinba was still president, he re-arranged the cabinet. Sergei Shamba was re-appointed Minister for Foreign Affairs and additionally became Vice-Premier.

=== Government of President Bagapsh ===
After the election of Sergei Bagapsh as president, Foreign Minister Sergei Shamba was one of the few Ministers to be re-appointed, on 26 March 2005.

Following the re-election of Bagapsh, Shamba was appointed prime minister (as outgoing prime minister Alexander Ankvab had been elected vice president), he was succeeded by his deputy Maxim Gvinjia on 26 February.

=== Government of President Ankvab ===
After the election of Alexander Ankvab, he appointed diplomat and academic Viacheslav Chirikba as Foreign Minister On 11 October.

=== Government of President Khajimba ===
Chirikba was only one of three Cabinet members to be re-appointed in the cabinet of Prime Minister Beslan Butba following the May 2014 Revolution and the subsequent election of Raul Khajimba as president.

Chirikba was again re-appointed under Prime Minister Artur Mikvabia, but on 20 September 2016, after the appointment of Beslan Bartsits as Prime Minister, he released a statement in which he announced his resignation because he was unable to continue in his post under the current circumstances. The Presidential press service responded by claiming that Chirikba had not been re-appointed because he had failed to lead a delegation to Transnistria in early September. Chirikba refuted this in another statement in which he explained that he had not been able to lead the delegation due to an attack of hypertension and claimed that the decision to re-appoint him had already been made at that point and that he had originally submitted his resignation on 31 August after Khajimba had for more than a month refused to meet him to discuss foreign affairs. In a press conference one week later, Khajimba specified that Chirikba had not been active enough as Foreign Minister and that as head of the Ministry, he had to be held responsible for certain financial irregularities that had been uncovered by the Control Chamber. On 4 October Chirikba's successor Daur Kove was appointed. In the intervening period, Deputy Minister Oleg Arshba had served as acting minister.

== List of officeholders ==
No.	Portrait	Name (Birth–Death)	Term of office			Government	Ref.
No.	Portrait	Name (Birth–Death)	Took office	Left office	Time in office	Government	Ref.
–	Vladimir Arshba	Vladimir Arshba (1951–2018); Acting	17 May 1993	23 September 1993	129 days	–	
1	Sokrat Jinjolia	Sokrat Jinjolia (born 1937)	23 September 1993	26 November 1994	1 year, 64 days	–	
2	Leonid Lakerbaia	Leonid Lakerbaia (born 1947)	29 June 1995	31 July 1996	1 year, 32 days	Ardzinba	
3	Konstantin Ozgan	Konstantin Ozgan (1939–2016)	31 July 1996	30 April 1997	273 days	Ardzinba	
4	Sergei Shamba	Sergei Shamba (born 1951)	30 April 1997	18 June 2004	7 years, 49 days	Ardzinba	
–	Gueorgui Otyrba	Gueorgui Otyrba; Acting	18 June 2004	28 July 2004	40 days	Ardzinba	
5	Igor Akhba	Igor Akhba (1949–2026)	28 July 2004	14 December 2004	139 days	Ardzinba	
(4)	Sergei Shamba	Sergei Shamba (born 1951)	14 December 2004	26 February 2010	5 years, 74 days	Ardzinba; Bagapsh	
6	Maxim Gvinjia	Maxim Gvinjia (born 1976)	26 February 2010	11 October 2011	1 year, 227 days	Bagapsh	
7	Viacheslav Chirikba	Viacheslav Chirikba (born 1959)	11 October 2011	20 September 2016	4 years, 345 days	Ankvab; Khajimba	
–	Oleg Arshba	Oleg Arshba (born 1959); Acting	20 September 2016	4 October 2016	14 days	Khajimba	
8	Daur Kove	Daur Kove (born 1979)	4 October 2016	18 November 2021	5 years, 45 days	Khajimba	
9	Inal Ardzinba	Inal Ardzinba (born 1990)	18 November 2021	7 May 2024	2 years, 171 days	Bzhania	
10	Bigava Odissey	Bigava Odissey (born 1977); Acting	28 May 2024	6 August 2024	70 days	Bzhania	
11	Sergey Shamba	Sergey Shamba (born 1951)	6 August 2024	18 April 2025	255 days	Gunba	
12	Irkali Tuzhba	Irkali Tuzhba (born 1978); Acting	7 May 2024	28 May 2024	21 days	Bzhania	
13	Oleg Bartsits	Oleg Bartsits (born 1967)	18 April 2025	present	1 year, 142 days	Gunba	
