= Gueorgui Otyrba =

Abkhazian politician and academic

1st Commissioner for Human Rights of Abkhazia
- In office 7 March 2007 – 4 May 2016
- President: Sergei Bagapsh; Alexander Ankvab; Raul Khajimba
- Succeeded by: Dmitri Marshan

Minister for Foreign Affairs of Abkhazia (acting)
- In office June 2004 – July 2004
- Prime Minister: Raul Khajimba
- Preceded by: Sergei Shamba
- Succeeded by: Igor Akhba

Gueorgui Otyrba is an Abkhazian politician and academic. He was the first Human Rights Commissioner of Abkhazia between 2007 and 2016 and acting Foreign Affairs Minister between June and July 2004.

== Education and career ==
Otyrba studied history at the Institute of History and Archives in Moscow, receiving his first degree in 1984, as well as a second degree from the Institute of General History in 1990. He was appointed as a Professor in the Department of Modern History at Abkhazian State University in the same year, and through the early 1990s, served as a visiting scholar in a number of universities around the world, including Johns Hopkins University and Maryland University in the United States and the Hebrew University of Jerusalem in Israel, often dealing in topics associated with the civil war in his homeland.

These experiences saw Otyrba take an interest in foreign policy, and in 1996, he underwent a course in mediation and human rights monitoring in Austria. He became involved in trying to establish dialogue between the two sides, and in 1997, was appointed Deputy Foreign Minister of Abkhazia. In the same year, he became Director of the Civil Society Development Centre a non-government organization based in the city of Gagra, a position which he held for approximately a year. Otyrba continued to both work in academia and serve as Deputy Foreign Minister for several years, and when long-serving Foreign Minister Sergey Shamba resigned to run in the 2004 elections, Otyrba was a natural choice to fill in as a temporary replacement. However, the position only lasted for two months before he was replaced by Igor Akhba on 28 July 2004, and Otyrba has since returned to his prior roles.

In his capacity of acting Foreign Minister, Otyrba headed the Abkhazian delegation to the meeting on repatriation of refugees held 20 July 2004 in Sochi.

On 3 March 2007, Otyrba was appointed the first Commissioner for Human Rights of Abkhazia under the President of Abkhazia by Sergei Bagapsh. Following the adoption of a law constituting a new, independent, Human Rights Commissioner, the old office under the President was abolished and Otyrba was formally dismissed by Raul Khajimba on 4 May 2016.

Otyrba is a native speaker of Abkhaz and Russian, speaks English fluently, and is also competent in Italian.

Political offices
| Preceded by Sergei Shamba | Minister for Foreign Affairs of Abkhazia; 2004 | Succeeded by Igor Akhba |
| Preceded by Office created | Human Rights Commissioner of Abkhazia; 2007-2016 | Succeeded by Dmitri Marshan (changed office) |
