= Garri Aiba =

Abkhaz politician (died 2004)

- გარი აიბა

Mayor of Sokhumi
- In office 1995–2000
- Preceded by: Nodar Khashba
- Succeeded by: Leonid Lolua

Personal details
- Died: 9 June 2004; Sokhumi, Abkhazia
- Political party: Amtskhara

Military service
- Allegiance: Abkhazia
- Battles/wars: War in Abkhazia (1992–1993)

Garri Aiba (Georgian: გარი აიბა; died 9 June 2004) was an opposition leader in Abkhazia at the time of his murder. He died when his car came under fire on 9 June 2004.

== History ==
Garri Aiba was a veteran of the 1992-1993 war with Georgia, in which he led Abkhazia anti-aircraft defenses, and a prominent businessman. From 1995 to 2000 he had been mayor of Sokhumi, capital of Abkhazia. Aiba had become one of the leaders of Amtsakhara, which was one of the main movements in opposition to the government of President Vladislav Ardzinba, two other leaders of which had also been killed in previous years.

== Murder ==
On 9 June 2004, Aiba's car came under fire, fifty metres from his home in Sokhumi. He got out of the car in an attempt to protect his ten-year-old daughter, but was seriously injured, and died later that day in the hospital. His death sent shockwaves through Abkhaz politics. Aiba had no business links and many people claimed that the killing was politically motivated. It sparked the resignations of several prominent ministers, including foreign minister (and fellow Amtsakhara leader) Sergey Shamba, interior minister Abessalom Beiya and Givi Agrba, head of the security services. However, Shamba later denied that his resignation was related to Aiba's death, and Prime Minister Raul Khadjimba refused to accept the resignations of Beiya and Agrba.

No one has yet been charged with Aiba's murder. Former opposition leader Sergei Bagapsh has since become president.

== Notes ==
Preceded by	Mayor of Sukhumi; 1995–2000	Succeeded by Leonid Lolua
