= Batal Tabagua =

Abkhazian politician (born 1962)

Batal Tabagua Баҭал Табаҕәуа

Chairman of the Central Election Commission of Abkhazia
- Incumbent
- Assumed office December 14, 2004
- Preceded by: Sergei Smyr

Minister for Justice of Abkhazia
- In office September 1995 – December 14, 2004
- President: Vladislav Ardzinba

Head of the Administration of Ochamchira District
- In office October 1993 – September 1995

Personal details
- Born: October 29, 1962 (age 63) Kutol, Ochamchira District, Abkhazian ASSR, Georgian SSR, Soviet Union

Batal Tabagua (Abkhaz: Баҭал Табаҕәуа, Georgian: ბატალ ტაბაღუა) is the Chairman of the Central Election Commission of the Republic of Abkhazia. He was appointed to the Central Election Commission December 11, 2004 by outgoing president Vladislav Ardzinba and elected Chairman December 14 after his predecessor, Sergei Smyr, had resigned during the crisis that ensued after the October 3 Presidential election. Previously, Tabagua had been Minister for Justice and head of the Ochamchira district administration.

Political offices
Preceded by Sergei Smyr	Chairman of the Central Election Commission of Abkhazia; 2004 –present	Succeeded by Incumbent
