= Ruslan Ajba =

Politician

Minister for Labour, Employment and Social Security
- Incumbent
- Assumed office 23 August 2016
- Prime Minister: Beslan Bartsits
- Preceded by: Suren Kerselyan

Personal details
- Born: 1975 (age 50–51) Achandara

Ruslan Ajba is the current Minister for Labour, Employment and Social Security of Abkhazia.

== Early life and education ==
Ajba was born in 1975 in the village of Achandara, Gudauta District. He finished school in 1992 and graduated in 1999 in finance and credit from the economic faculty of the Abkhazian State University. In subsequent years Ajba worked as Chief Specialist in the Main Control Directorate of the presidential administration.

== Pension Fund Head and Minister for Labour ==
On 11 November 2011, Ajba was appointed Head of the Pension Fund by President Alexander Ankvab.

On 23 August 2016, Ajba was appointed Minister for Labour, Employment and Social Security in the new cabinet of Prime Minister Beslan Bartsits, succeeding Suren Kerselyan.
