= Minister for Culture and the Preservation of Historical and Cultural Heritage of Abkhazia =

Government agency in Abkhazia

The Ministry for Culture and the Preservation of Historical and Cultural Heritage of Abkhazia (Russian: Министр культуры и сохранения историко-культурного наследия Абхазии) is a government agency of Abkhazia which holds a ministerial position in the Abkhazian government.

== History ==
=== Government of President Khajimba ===
On 15 October 2014, after his election as president, Raul Khajimba approved the structure of the new cabinet. The State Administration for the Preservation of Historical and Cultural Heritage was adjoined to the Ministry of Culture, which was renamed the Ministry of Culture and the Preservation of Historical and Cultural Heritage.

On 15 October, Elvira Arsalia was appointed the new Minister.

== List of ministers for culture of Abkhazia ==
| # | Name | Entered office | Left office | President | Comments |
|---|---|---|---|---|---|
| | Vladimir Kvarchelia | October 1954 | March 1967 | | |
| | Nikolai Kiut | 1967 | 1973 | | |
| | Aleksei Argun | 1975 | 1986 | | |
| | Nugzar Ashuba | 1986 | 1992 | | |
| | Nodar Chanba | 1991 | 1993 | | |
| | Nodar Pilia | 1994 | 1995 | | |
| | Kesou Khagba | 1995 | 1999 | Vladislav Ardzinba | |
| | Vladimir Zantaria | 1999 | 19 July 2001 | Vladislav Ardzinba | |
| | Leonid Enik | 2001 | 10 March 2005 | Vladislav Ardzinba | |
| | Nugzar Logua | 10 March 2005 | 29 May 2011 | Sergei Bagapsh | |
| | Nugzar Logua | 29 May 2011 | 13 October 2011 | Alexander Ankvab | |
| | Badr Gunba | 13 October 2011 | 1 June 2014 | Alexander Ankvab | |
| | Badr Gunba | 1 June 2014 | 15 October 2014 | Valeri Bganba | |
| | Elvira Arsalia | 15 October 2014 | Present | Raul Khajimba | |
