= Juan Vicente Paredes Torrealba =

Venezuelan diplomat

Juan Vicente Paredes Torrealba is a Venezuelan diplomat and Venezuela's current Ambassador to Russia and Abkhazia.

Paredes Torrealba has been ambassador to Russia since 21 June 2013.

On 3 September 2015, Paredes Torrealba presented his credentials to President of Abkhazia Raul Khajimba.
