= Inal Ardzinba =

Abkhazian foreign affairs minister

- Инал Арӡынба (Abkhaz) ინალ არძინბა (Georgian); Инал Батувич Ардзинба (Russian)
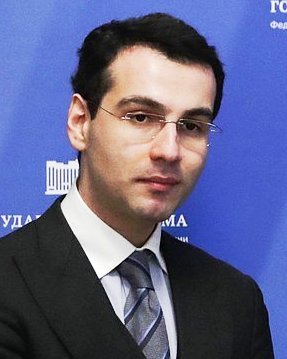

10th Minister for Foreign Affairs
- Prime Minister: Alexander Ankvab
- Preceded by: Daur Kove
- Succeeded by: Irakli Tuzhba (acting)
- In office 18 November 2021 – 7 May 2024

Personal details
- Born: 26 July 1990 (age 36) Sukhumi, Abkhaz ASSR, Georgian SSR, Soviet Union
- Education: Higher School of Economics, Moscow

Inal Batuvych Ardzinba (Abkhaz: Инал Арӡынба; Georgian: ინალ არძინბა; Russian: Инал Батувич Ардзинба; born 26 July 1990) is an Abkhazian politician who was Minister for Foreign Affairs of Abkhazia from November 2021 to May 2024.

== Career ==
Beginning in 2014, Ardzinba worked in the Presidential Administration of Russia, eventually becoming deputy of Vladislav Surkov, then an assistant to the President of the Russian Federation.

In 2016, Ardzinba played a prominent role in the Surkov leaks. He advocates for the BRICS to play a leading role in international politics after Russia was expelled from the Group of Eight.

=== Abkhazia ===
In January 2020, Ardzinba founded the Future of Abkhazia party. Until then, he was considered to be close to the party Amtsakhara. Shortly thereafter, Ardzinba supported then-opposition candidate Aslan Bzhania in the 2020 Abkhazian presidential election.

In 2021, President Aslan Bzhania appointed Ardzinba to be the foreign minister of Abkhazia. His appointment was a surprise for many experts on the region. He is the youngest person to ever hold the office. After he was appointed, Ardzinba stated that the deepening of cooperation with Russia was a priority for Abkhazia’s foreign policy.

In January 2022, Ardzinba halted the EU's and UNDP's confidence-building COBERM program in Abkhazia. In July 2022, he proposed moving the Geneva International Discussions "to another more neutral city" like Minsk or Istanbul.

=== Involvement in Ukraine ===
As an official of the Presidential Administration of Russia, Ardzinba dealt with issues of interaction with Ukraine and the self-proclaimed Donetsk People's Republic and Luhansk People's Republic.

In May 2015, the Security Service of Ukraine submitted to the Prosecutor General's Office materials on Ardzinba's involvement in terrorist activities on the territory of Ukraine. In November, the Prosecutor's Office of the Odesa region began an investigation in absentia against Ardzinba in connection with an attempt to change the state borders of Ukraine.

In November 2015, Ukraine put Ardzinba on the international wanted list for violating the country's constitutional order. This information was confirmed by the Deputy Prosecutor General of Ukraine David Sakvarelidze. In December 2015, he was accused by the Ukrainian authorities of trying to destabilize the situation in Bessarabia in southern Ukraine.

On 10 June 2016, the head of the Security Service of Ukraine Vasyl Hrytsak announced that a criminal case was being conducted against Ardzinba in connection with his involvement in an attempt to create the Bessarabian People's Republic in the Odesa region of Ukraine – the formation of pro-Putin separatists similar to the Donetsk People's Republic and Luhansk People's Republic.

== Personal life ==
According to Yevgeny Yasin, former president of Abkhazia Vladislav Ardzinba is Inal Ardzinba's uncle. Other members of the Ardzinba family include Adgur Ardzinba and Dmitry Ardzinba (member of the People's Assembly).

== See also ==
- List of foreign ministers in 2021

Political offices
Preceded by Daur Kove	Minister for Foreign Affairs; 2021–2024	Succeeded by Irakli Tuzhba (acting)
