= Konstantin Ozgan =

Abkhazian politician (1939–2016)

Konstantin Ozgan Константин Озган კონსტანტინე ოზგანი
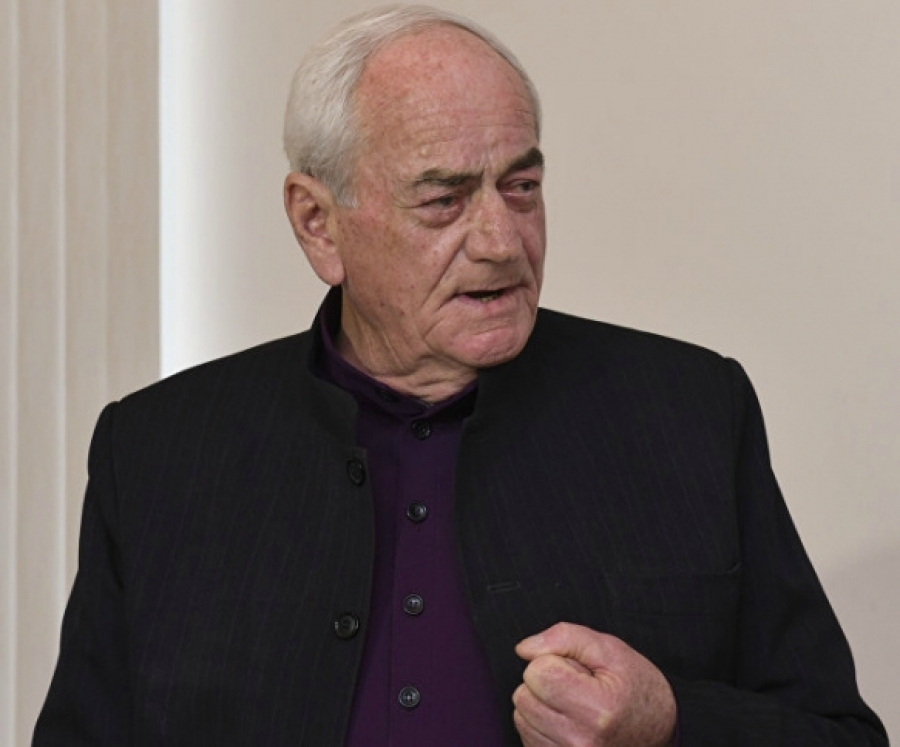
- Ozgan in 2021

Chairman of the Council of Elders of Abkhazia
- In office 31 July 2009 – 22 March 2016
- Preceded by: Pavel Adzynba
- Succeeded by: Apollon Shinkuba

Deputy Speaker of the People's Assembly of Abkhazia
- In office 2002–2007

First Vice Premier and Minister for the Economy of Abkhazia
- In office 1997–1999
- President: Vladislav Ardzinba

4th Minister for Foreign Affairs of Abkhazia
- In office August 1996 – April 1997
- President: Vladislav Ardzinba
- Preceded by: Leonid Lakerbaia
- Succeeded by: Sergei Shamba

Personal details
- Born: May 15, 1939 Lykhny, Gudauta District, Abkhazian ASSR, Georgian SSR, Soviet Union
- Died: 22 March 2016 (aged 76) Abkhazian A.R Georgia

Konstantin Ozgan (Abkhaz: Константин Озган, Georgian: კონსტანტინე ოზგანი, romanized: k'onst'ant'ine ozgani) was a leading politician in Abkhazia serving i.a. as Supreme Soviet Chairman, Foreign Minister, Economy Minister, First Vice Premier and as Chairman of the Council of Elders of Abkhazia.

== Early life and career ==
Konstantin Ozgan was born on 15 May 1939 in the village of Lykhny, Gudauta District. In 1978, Ozgan became first secretary of the Gudauta Raikom of the Communist Party (a post he held until 1989) and a deputy of the Supreme Soviet of the Abkhazian ASSR and deputy head of its Presidium. In 1987, Ozgan became Chairman of the Supreme Soviet, a ceremonial function.

According to Anri Jergenia, in 1989, the Central Committee of the Georgian SSR tried to nominate Ozgan, who enjoyed popularity, for the Supreme Soviet of the Soviet Union to thwart the election of Vladislav Ardzinba. However, Ozgan refused to be nominated. In 1990, Ozgan resigned as Supreme Soviet Chairman to make way for Ardzinba, because the Presidium had been abolished and it had become the most important office.

He has been accused by Georgian intellectuals of being responsible for the July 1989 clashes in Sukhumi, in which 25 people died.

From 1991 until 1996, Ozgan was a member of the People's Assembly of Abkhazia.

== Minister for Foreign Affairs ==
Konstantin Ozgan rose to the position of Abkhazian foreign minister in 1996, when his predecessor Leonid Lakerbaia resigned. He handled much of the early negotiations with the United Nations. He met then Georgian president Eduard Shevardnadze multiple times, as part of a regular series of negotiations during his two years in office.

As one of the entity's more moderate leaders, he once proposed a five-year moratorium on discussions of Abkhazia's future political status as an interim compromise, in a similar fashion to the deal Russia had at that time with Chechnya. While this was the closest the two sides had come to agreement, it was rejected by the Georgian side.

In the earlier stages of Ozgan's term, he had overseen some of the more successful negotiations between the two sides. However, in 1997, tensions began to rise again. Ozgan accused the Georgian government of being behind terrorist attacks on Abkhaz soldiers. He also demanded that the Commonwealth of Independent States lift sanctions before any Georgian refugees could return to their homes – a policy which has since continued under his successors.

== Vice Premier and Minister for the Economy ==
After being replaced as foreign minister, Ozgan was appointed Vice Premier of Abkhazia and minister for the Economy. In 1999, he headed the Abkhaz commission that was to oversee the unilateral repatriation to the Gali district of ethnic Georgian displaced persons. On April 2, 1999, Ozgan survived an assassination attempt when four colleagues were seriously injured by a landmine.

== Deputy of Parliament ==
Though he no longer occupied as much of a public role as he once did, Ozgan remained a deputy in the People's Assembly of Abkhazia. He lost a 2002 bid for the position of speaker to Nugzar Ashuba, and became deputy speaker instead. Ozgan failed to be re-elected in the 2007 elections.

Konstantin Ozgan joined the opposition movement against former President Vladislav Ardzinba, which in 2005 was successful in installing opposition candidate Sergei Bagapsh as President. One of his recent proposals was an unsuccessful attempt to have the segment of the Abkhaz constitution overturned that demanded that a presidential candidate have lived in Abkhazia for more than five years before running for office.

== Chairman of the Council of Elders ==
On 31 July 2009 Konstantin Ozgan was chosen by the Council of Elders of Abkhazia to succeed outgoing chairman Pavel Adzynba. Adzynba had asked to be allowed to step down after heading the council for 16 years.

On 21 March 2016, in response to a planned recall referendum, Ozgan on behalf of the Council of the Elders called upon government and opposition to form a coalition government instead.

== Death ==
Konstantin Ozgan died on 22 March 2016. On 25 March, Ozgan was posthumously awarded the Order of Leon by President Raul Khajimba.

== Notes ==
Political offices
Preceded by Leonid Lakerbaia	Minister for Foreign Affairs of Abkhazia; 1996–1997	Succeeded by Sergei Shamba
Preceded by Pavel Adzynba	Chairman of the Council of Elders of Abkhazia; 2009–2016	Succeeded by Apollon Shinkuba
