= Nodar Khashba =

Abkhaz politician

- Нодар Хашба
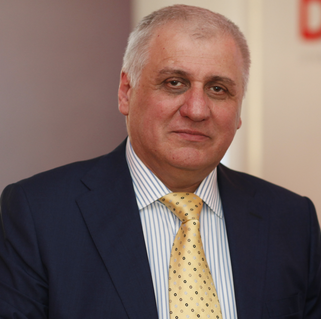

9th Prime Minister of Abkhazia
- In office 9 October 2004 – 14 February 2005
- President: Vladislav Ardzinba
- Preceded by: Raul Khajimba
- Succeeded by: Alexander Ankvab

Mayor of Sukhumi
- In office 1993–1995
- Preceded by: Guram Gabiskiria
- Succeeded by: Garri Aiba

Personal details
- Born: 1 October 1951 (age 73); Tkvarcheli, Abkhazian ASSR, Georgian SSR, Soviet Union
- Political party: United Abkhazia

Nodar Vladimirovich Khashba (Abkhaz: Нодар Хашба, Georgian: ნოდარ ხაშბა; born 1 October 1951) is a former prime minister of Georgia's breakaway republic of Abkhazia and a former mayor of Sukhumi.

Khashba was mayor of Sukhumi from 1993 until 1995. Afterwards he became a senior official in Russia's emergencies ministry. In April 2004 he emerged as one of the leaders of a new political movement named United Abkhazia (Yedinaya Abkhazia, reminiscent of the Russian pro-Kremlin party Yedinaya Rossiya). He was not eligible to run in the October 2004 presidential election in Abkhazia because of a requirement that candidates must have been resident in Abkhazia for five years. Shortly after the election, amid confusion surrounding its outcome, the outgoing president, Vladislav Ardzinba, appointed Khashba prime minister.

On 14 November, Prime Minister Nodar Khashba, named by the relatives of human rights activist Tamara Shakryl as responsible for her death and threatened by them, had to spend the night at Russia's Peacemaking Headquarters in Sukhumi. Tensions continued to mount as the day for Bagapsh's inaugural ceremony came. In early December 2004, however, Bagapsh came to an agreement with Khadjimba under which they would run in new elections under a national unity ticket, with Bagapsh as presidential candidate and Khadjimba as vice-presidential candidate. The ticket won the elections with over 90% of the vote, and the new administration took office on 12 February 2005.

Political offices
Preceded by Raul Khadjimba	Prime Minister of Abkhazia; 2004–2005	Succeeded by Alexander Ankvab
