= Viacheslav Tsugba =

Prime Minister of Abkhazia

Viacheslav Mikhail-ipa Tsugba Виачеслав Михаил-иҧа Цыгәба

3rd Prime Minister of Abkhazia
- In office 20 December 1999 – 30 May 2001
- President: Vladislav Ardzinba
- Preceded by: Sergei Uasyl-ipa Bagapsh
- Succeeded by: Anri Mikhail-ipa Jergenia

Chairman of the Central Election Commission of Abkhazia
- In office 1991/April 1998? – 1999

Personal details
- Born: January 1, 1944 (age 82) Aatsy, Gudauta District, Abkhazian ASSR, Georgian SSR, Soviet Union

Viacheslav Mikhail-ipa Tsugba (Abkhaz: Виачеслав Михаил-иҧа Цыгәба, Georgian: ვიაჩესლავ ცუგბა; born 1 January 1944) was the third Prime Minister of the Republic of Abkhazia (a de facto independent republic of Georgia) from December 1999 to May 2001. Before his appointment as prime minister, Tsugba had headed the Central Election Committee, which had overseen the internationally unrecognised simultaneously held October 1999 presidential election and constitutional referendum.

== Early life and career ==
Viacheslav Tsugba was born on 1 January 1944 in the village of Aatsy in the Gudauta District of what was then the Abkhazian Autonomous Soviet Socialist Republic. In 1970, Tsugba graduated from the Sukhumi Pedagological Institute. In 1978, he became aspirant member of the Academy of Social Sciences of the CPSU Central Committee. From 1973 until 1975, Tsugba was 1st secretary of the Abkhazian regional committee of the Komsomol, from 1975 until 1978 he was 1st secretary of the Ochamchira raikom of the CPSU, and from 1978 to 1989 Deputy Chairman of the Council of Ministers and a deputy of the Supreme Council of the Abkhazian ASSR.

On 20 July 1991, Tsugba was appointed Chairman of the Central Election Commission of Abkhazia.

== Prime minister ==
After Vladislav Ardzinba's re-election as president, Viacheslav Tsugba was appointed prime minister on 20 December 1999.

Tsugba's time as prime minister was marked by a relative thawing of tensions between Abkhazia and Georgia. While Tsugba, like all the other prime ministers, strongly opposed any idea of reunification with Georgia, and highly criticised cross-border raids by Georgian paramilitaries, he managed to demilitarise the conflict to a degree. This was highlighted by an agreement signed in July 2000, where both sides agreed not to settle the conflict by force. He tended to negotiate alongside foreign minister Sergei Shamba, rather than handling negotiations himself.

In the first months of 2001, Tsugba was increasingly criticised by the opposition, led by the Amtsakhara movement. On 15 May 2001 Tsugba handed in his resignation. This remained secret for two weeks, and rumours that Tsugba had handed in his resignation which surfaced towards the end of May were denied by the President's press spokesman Raul Agrba. But on 30 May, President Ardzinba accepted Tsugba's resignation.

In his resignation request, Tsugba's explanation was that "serious problems have arisen in connection with lawmaking, the professional qualifications of personnel at all levels of administration, from the highest to the lowest, with their accountability and the need to improve management and increase strict control and institute an uncompromising fight against crime."

== Vice Speaker of Parliament ==
Tsugba has been a member of the People's Assembly of Abkhazia since 2002 and is one of its current Vice Speakers.

Political offices
Preceded by Sergei Uasyl-ipa Bagapsh	Prime Minister of Abkhazia; 1999–2001	Succeeded by Anri Mikhail-ipa Jergenia
Preceded by New office	Chairman of the Central Election Commission of Abkhazia; 1991 – 1999	Succeeded by Sergei Smyr
