= Sergei Shamba =

Abkhaz politician

- Сергеи Шамба

Chairman of United Abkhazia
- Incumbent
- Assumed office 27 January 2016
- Preceded by: Aleksei Tania (Acting); Daur Tarba

Prime Minister of Abkhazia
- In office 13 February 2010 – 27 September 2011
- President: Sergei Bagapsh; Alexander Ankvab (Acting)
- Preceded by: Alexander Ankvab
- Succeeded by: Leonid Lakerbaia

Minister for Foreign Affairs of Abkhazia
- In office 15 December 2004 – 26 February 2010
- Prime Minister: Alexander Ankvab
- Preceded by: Igor Akhba
- Succeeded by: Maxim Gvinjia
- In office 7 May 1997 – 14 June 2004
- Prime Minister: Sergei Bagapsh; Viacheslav Tsugba; Anri Jergenia; Gennady Gagulia; Raul Khajimba
- Preceded by: Konstantin Ozgan
- Succeeded by: Gueorgui Otyrba (Acting); Igor Akhba

2nd Chairman of Aidgylara
- In office 3 February 1990 – February 1992
- Preceded by: Alexey Gogua
- Succeeded by: Rauf Ebzhnou (acting)

Personal details
- Born: 15 March 1951 (age 75) Gudauta, Abkhaz ASSR, Georgian SSR, Soviet Union
- Party: United Abkhazia (2016–present)
- Other political affiliations: United Abkhazia (2004); Social-Democratic Party (2004–2005)

Sergei Miron-ipa Shamba (Abkhaz: Сергеи Мирон-иԥа Шамба, Georgian: სერგეი შამბა; born 15 March 1951) is an Abkhaz politician. He is currently a member of the People's Assembly of Abkhazia and Chairman of United Abkhazia. He was Prime Minister of Abkhazia under President Sergei Bagapsh from 13 February 2010 until 27 September 2011. Between 1997 and 2010, he had been Minister for Foreign Affairs under both Bagapsh and his predecessor Vladislav Ardzinba, with only a half-year interruption in 2004. Shamba has twice unsuccessfully contested the presidential elections, in 2004 and 2011. He has been a staunch proponent of dialogue between Abkhazia and Georgia.

== Early life and career ==
Sergei Shamba was born on 15 March 1951 in Gudauta. He entered politics at the age of 24. Until February 1992, Shamba was the head of Aidgylara, which played a leading role in Abkhazia's struggle for independence. During the 1992-1993 War in Abkhazia, he served as First Deputy Minister of Defence.

== First Ministership for Foreign Affairs ==
On 7 May 1997, Shamba became Minister for Foreign Affairs, succeeding Konstantin Ozgan. Throughout his time as foreign minister, it often fell to Shamba to defend Abkhazia's separation from Georgia in the international media. He has been a strong supporter of Abkhazian independence, and has flatly opposed any attempts at reunification with Georgia. Though he has headed several Abkhaz delegations to United Nations-sponsored talks with Georgia, Abkhazia has failed to receive any international recognition.

As foreign minister, Shamba dealt with several leaders of non-government organizations, meeting, among others, International Red Crescent Organization president Jean Michel Corbot. He succeeded in gaining USAID assistance for several reconstruction projects in Sukhumi.

In 1998, Shamba received his Doctorate from the Yerevan Institute of Archeology. On 9 July 2001, Shamba was awarded the diplomatic rank of Extraordinary and Plenipotentiary Ambassador.

Shamba resigned from the post of foreign minister on June 14, 2004, citing a number of reasons, such as the murder, five days before, of fellow opposition leader Garri Aiba and the upcoming presidential elections. After his resignation, he openly called for the entire government to stand aside.

== October 2004 presidential election ==
Shamba was one of the favorites to receive the nomination of the newly forged Amtsakhara-United Abkhazia opposition alliance for the October 2004 presidential elections. However, on July 20, 2004, the movements named former prime minister Sergei Bagapsh and Stanislav Lakoba as their respective presidential and vice presidential candidates. Shamba still participated in the election with Vladimir Arshba as his running mate and he came in third place with 6.9% of the vote. After the election a conflict broke between front runners Sergei Bagapsh and Raul Khajimba, which was only resolved when the two teams agreed to hold new elections in which they would participate on a joint ticket.

During the crisis on 15 October Shamba had founded the Social-Democratic Party of Abkhazia along with other people from his election campaign, chief of staff Gennadi Alamia became its first chairman. The Social-Democratic Party called on voters to boycott the new elections and Shamba did not participate in them.

== Second Ministership for Foreign Affairs and Prime Minister ==
On 15 December 2004 Shamba had again been appointed Minister for Foreign affairs by Ardzinba, replacing Igor Akhba. The power-sharing agreement between Bagapsh and Khajimba stipulated that the latter could appoint the new Minister for Foreign Affairs, and Khajimba chose to keep Sergei Shamba, despite the fact that Bagapsh long insisted on appointing Natella Akaba. Even though Shamba had now joined the government, the social-democratic party stayed in opposition.

On 20 May 2009 the Social-Democratic Party was one of a number of opposition parties that during a press conference strongly criticised the government's foreign policy. The criticism was rejected by Shamba two days later, dismissing it as "biased".

Despite being considered by some to again be a possible candidate, Shamba did not participate in the December 2009 presidential election. The election resulted in a second term for Sergei Bagapsh, and on 13 February 2010, Shamba was appointed prime minister, succeeding Alexander Ankvab, who had become vice president. On 26 February Shamba was succeeded as Foreign Minister by his deputy Maxim Gvinjia.

== August 2011 presidential election and retirement from active politics ==
The next presidential election was originally scheduled to take place in 2014, however, the Constitution of Abkhazia required an election to be held within three months after the unexpected death of incumbent president Sergei Bagapsh on 29 May 2011. Only three candidates participated: Shamba, outgoing Vice President and Acting President Alexander Ankvab and opposition leader Raul Khajimba. Shamba's vice presidential candidate was deputy chairman of the State Committee for Youth Affairs and Sport Shamil Adzynba. The pair was nominated by an initiative group on 8 July and applied for registration on 16 July. All presidential candidates passed their Abkhaz language test on 20 July 2011, were formally registered by the Central Election Commission on 25 July and received their certificates on 26 July.

Shamba and Adzynba received political support from the Party for Economic Development on 21 July, 10 (out of 12) members of the Association of Youth Organisations on 28 July and the Communist Party 9 August. The election campaign was led by Beslan Eshba.

The election was won by Alexander Ankvab. Shamba came in second place with 21.02% of the vote, narrowly ahead of Khajimba.

After the election, Shamba retired from active politics. Observers noted that Shamba would have been above the legal maximum age for the Presidency at the time of the next election. Shamba himself has stated that he wanted to make way for younger politicians, hoping that Abkhazia had entered a new phase of sustained development and conflict-free transfers of power.

== Member of Parliament (second time) and Chairman of United Abkhazia ==
Shamba was one of the leaders of the protests that led to the May 2014 ouster of President Ankvab. After the election of Raul Khajimba as president, he participated in the 21 December by-election in Constituency no. 24 that had become necessary after Khajimba had appointed Adgur Kharazia as acting mayor of Sukhumi. On 3 November, Shamba's nomination by an initiative group was registered. Shamba failed to obtain a first-round victory, but defeated Tengiz Agrba in the run-off on 28 December.

On 5 September 2015, Shamba became the leader of a faction he established along with six other members of the People's Assembly.

On 27 January 2016, Shamba was elected Chairman of United Abkhazia during its sixth congress, after Daur Tarba had resigned the role on 1 October 2015.

In 2020, Shamba was selected to lead Abkhazia's security council by President Aslan Bzhania, a signal that Shamba was serious about increasing dialogue with Georgia.

Political offices
Preceded by Konstantin Ozgan	Minister for Foreign Affairs; 1997–2004	Succeeded by Gueorgui Otyrba; Acting
Preceded by Igor Akhba	Minister for Foreign Affairs; 2004–2010	Succeeded by Maxim Gvinjia
Preceded by Alexander Ankvab	Prime Minister of Abkhazia; 2010–2011	Succeeded by Leonid Lakerbaia
