= Avidzba (surname) =

Avidzba (Abkhaz: Аҩӡба; Russian: Авидзба) is an Abkhaz surname.

Notable people with the surname include:

- Alen Avidzba (born 2000), Russian tennis player
- Alias Avidzba, Abkhazian politician
- Hadzhera Avidzba (1917–1997), Abkhazian pianist
- Meri Avidzba (1917–1986), Abkhazian aviator
- Vladimir Avidzba (1937–2020), Abkhazian diplomat and politician
- Zaur Avidzba (1953–2015), Abkhazian businessman and politician
