= Zurab Agumava =

Abkhazian politician

Head of the Supreme Court
- Incumbent
- Assumed office 30 July 2015
- Preceded by: Roman Mushba

Prosecutor General (acting)
- In office 6 June 2014 – 7 October 2014
- Preceded by: Saferbei Mikanba
- Succeeded by: Aleksei Lomia

Military Prosecutor
- Incumbent
- Assumed office 2006
- Preceded by: ?

Head of Sukhumi District
- In office 2 April 2003 – 2006
- President: Vladislav Ardzinba; Sergei Bagapsh
- Preceded by: Lev Avidzba
- Succeeded by: Vladimir Avidzba

Head of the State Security Service
- In office 1 November 2001 – 2 April 2003
- President: Vladislav Ardzinba
- Preceded by: Raul Khajimba
- Succeeded by: Givi Agrba

Minister for Internal Affairs
- In office 2 July 2001 – 1 November 2001
- President: Vladislav Ardzinba
- Prime Minister: Anri Jergenia
- Preceded by: Almasbei Kchach
- Succeeded by: Almasbei Kchach

Personal details
- Born: 1961 (age 64–65) Eshera

Zurab Mikhailovich Agumava (Russian: Зураб Михайлович Агумава; born 1961) is the head of the Supreme Court and a former politician from Abkhazia.

== Early life ==
Agumava was born in 1961 in the village of Eshera and was educated in the local school. In 1987, Agumava graduated in jurisprudence from the Abkhazian State University.

== Career ==
Following his graduation, Agumava joined the Security Service. During the 1992–93 war with Georgia, he led counterintelligence on the Gumista front. Agumava was promoted first to deputy head in 1993 and then, after the end of the war in December 1993, head of military counterintelligence of Abkhazia. Between 1995 and May 1999, he held several senior posts in the Security Service and the Military Prosecution. In May 1999, Zurab Agumava was elected as a Supreme Court judge.

=== Interior Minister and Security Service Head ===
On 2 April Agumava was appointed Interior Minister by President Vladislav Ardzinba on 2 July 2001. On 1 November 2001, Agumava succeeded Raul Khajimba as Head of the State Security Service. On 2 April 2003, Agumava was appointed acting Head of the Sukhumi District, a post which he continued to hold until Ardzinba's successor Sergei Bagapsh appointed him Military Prosecutor in 2006.

=== Head of the Supreme Court ===
On 6 June 2014, Agumava was appointed acting Prosecutor General after the dismissal of Saferbei Mikanba following the 2014 Abkhazian political crisis. On 9 September, this appointment was extended by acting President Valeri Bganba until 7 October 2014, on which date Parliament elected Aleksei Lomia.

On 30 July, Agumava was elected Head of the Supreme Court by Parliament, to succeed Roman Mushba who had announced his resignation, coinciding with the end of his mandate.
