= State Security Service of Abkhazia =

Intelligence agency of Abkhazia

- Аҧсны Аҳәынҭқарра ашәарҭадаратә маҵзура (Abkhaz); Служба государственной безопасности Республики Абхазия (Russian)

Security agency overview
- Formed: 20 December 1992; 33 years ago
- Headquarters: Sukhumi
- Security agency executive: Dmitry Kuchuberia, Chairman
- Website: sgb.apsny.land

The State Security Service of Abkhazia (Abkhaz: Аҧсны Аҳәынҭқарра ашәарҭадаратә маҵзура, Russian: Служба государственной безопасности Республики Абхазия) is the principal security and intelligence agency of Abkhazia.

== History ==
On 27 November 1991, the Supreme Soviet of Abkhazia decreed to abolish the Abkhazian KGB and to establish the State Security Service. On 4 December 1992, the Supreme Soviet shortened its name to Security Service of Abkhazia.

Until 1992, the State Security Service was led by Grigori Komoshvili. After the outbreak of the 1992–1993 war with Georgia, Komoshvili's Deputy Gennadi Berulava became the new head. In early October 1993, after the war had ended, he was dismissed and succeeded by Astamur Tarba.

On 20 November 1992, during the war, the Abkhazian border guard was established.

=== Government of President Ardzinba ===
On 5 May 1997, President Vladislav Ardzinba decreed to rename the Service back to State Security Service of Abkhazia.

After a bomb attack on 13 December 1999 in Sukhumi targeting government officials, Ardzinba dismissed Astamur Tarba and replaced him with First Deputy Chairman of the State Customs Committee Raul Khajimba. On 18 June 2001, Khajimba also became First Vice Premier, and on 1 November he was replaced as State Security Service Head by Interior Minister Zurab Agumava.

On 2 April 2003, Agumava was replaced by Advisor to the President on Military Matters Givi Agrba.

Agrba handed in his resignation on 15 June 2004 along with Foreign Minister Sergei Shamba and First Vice Premier Astamur Tarba following the murder of opposition politician Garri Aiba. Agrba's resignation was accepted by Ardzinba on 7 July and he was replaced by Mikhail Tarba.

=== Governments of Presidents Bagapsh and Ankvab ===
Following the Tangerine Revolution and the election of President Sergei Bagapsh in 2005, he appointed Iuri Ashuba as Security Service Head on 28 February 2005. After his December 2009 re-election, he replaced Ashuba with Aslan Bzhania on 23 February 2010.

Bzhania remained Security Service Head following the death in office of Bagapsh and the 2011 election of Alexander Ankvab.

=== Government of President Khajimba ===
After the May 2014 Revolution and Ankvab's forced resignation, Bzhania became the candidate representing the outgoing government in the August 2014 Presidential election. After his loss to opposition candidate Raul Khajimba, he was replaced as Security Service Head by his deputy (and head of the Border Guard) Zurab Margania on 29 September.

== Chairmen ==
Term of office	Chairman	Photo
September 1993 – December 1999	Astamur Tarba	
1999 – 2001	Raul Khajimba	
2001 – April 2, 2003	Zurab Agumava	
April 2, 2003 – 2005	Givi Agrba	
February 28, 2005 – February 24, 2010	Iuri Ashuba	
February 24, 2010 – September 29, 2014	Aslan Bzhania	
September 29, 2014 – May 12, 2020	Zurab Margania	
February 10, 2021 – June 13, 2023	Robert Kiut	
August 31, 2023 – August 7, 2024	Temur Ahiba	
August 7, 2024 — Present	Dmitry Kuchuberia	
