= Mtiskalta Church of the Transfiguration =

Church in Mtiskalta, Abkhazia, Georgia

Mtiskalta Church of the Transfiguration მთისკალთის ფერიცვალების ეკლესია (in Georgian)
- Location within Abkhazia Location within Georgia

Religion
- Province: Abkhazia

Location
- Location: (Georgia (country)) Mtiskalta, Sokhumi Municipality, Abkhazia, Georgia
- Interactive map of Mtiskalta Church of the Transfiguration მთისკალთის ფერიცვალების ეკლესია (in Georgian)
- Coordinates: 43°07′38″N 41°02′50″E

Architecture
- Type: Church
- Completed: 19th century

Mtiskalta Church of Transfiguration (Georgian: მთისკალთის ფერიცვალების ეკლესია) is a church in the village of Mtiskalta, Sokhumi municipality, Autonomous Republic of Abkhazia, Georgia. The church was built in the 19th century.

Not to be confused with ruins of nearby Mtiskalta Church built in 19th and 20th centuries.
