= Guma, Abkhazia =

Guma გუმა
- Village
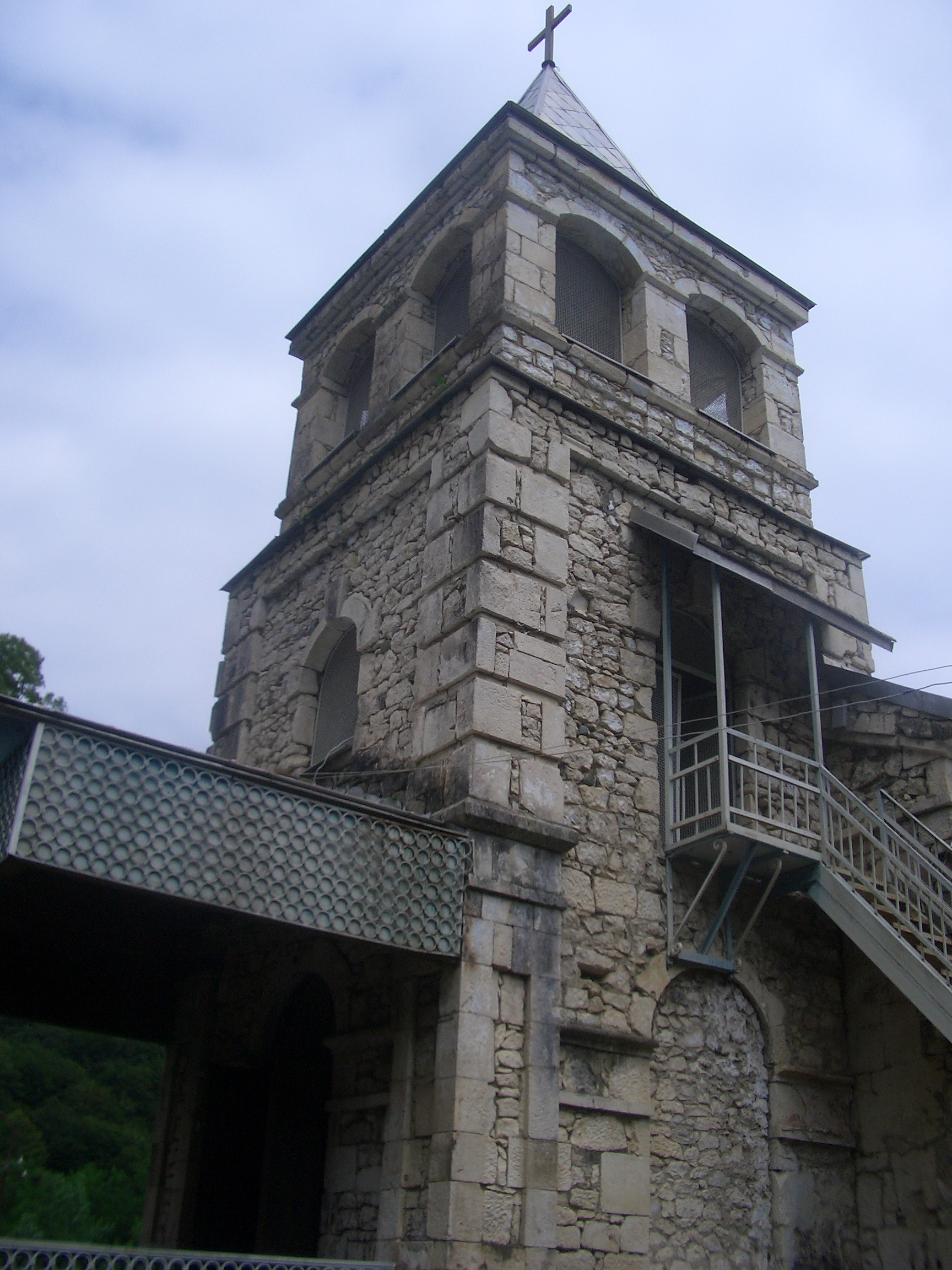

- Location within Georgia Location within Abkhazia
- Coordinates: 43.13°N 41.03°E
- Country: Georgia
- Partially recognized independent country: Abkhazia
- District: Sukhumi
- Elevation: 380 m (1,250 ft)

Population (2011)
  - Total: 38
- Time zone: UTC+4 (GET)

Guma (Georgian: გუმა; Abkhaz: Гәыма; Russian: Гу́ма) is a village in Sokhumi District of Abkhazia, Georgia. Its altitude above sea level is around 380 m, and it is 23 kilometres (14 mi) north of Sukhumi. As of 2011, the village had a population of 38, of which 86.8% were ethnic Armenians, 10.5% were ethnic Russians and 2.6% were ethnic Georgians.

== See also ==
- Sukhumi District
