= Odishi Church of Mother of God =

Church in Odishi, Autonomous Republic of Abkhazia, Georgia

Odishi Church of Mother of God ოდიშის ღვთისმშობლის ეკლესია (in Georgian)
- Location within Abkhazia Location within Georgia

Religion
- Affiliation: Georgian Orthodox
- District: Sokhumi Municipality
- Province: Abkhazia
- Ecclesiastical or organizational status: ruins

Location
- Location: (Georgia (country)) Odishi Sokhumi Municipality, Abkhazia, Georgia
- Interactive map of Odishi Church of Mother of God ოდიშის ღვთისმშობლის ეკლესია (in Georgian)
- Coordinates: 43°05′15″N 41°05′00″E

Architecture
- Type: Church
- Completed: Middle Ages

Odishi Church of Mother of God (Georgian: ოდიშის ღვთისმშობლის ეკლესია) is a church in the village of Odishi, Sokhumi municipality, Autonomous Republic of Abkhazia, Georgia.

== History ==
The church was built in the medieval period. The church walls are in a heavy physical condition and need urgent conservation.
