= Dolmens of Abkhazia =

A dolmen is a type of prehistoric single-chamber megalithic tomb. They are found throughout Asia, Europe and Africa, with about 80 being located in Abkhazia.

== Description ==
The dolmen usually consists of four megalith walls made of limestone or sandstone, sometimes with a fifth as the floor, supporting a sixth: a large flat horizontal capstone or "table". In the front slab, there is a circular or oval access hole, which has a stone plug.

The largest of the dolmens around the abandoned village of Azanta in the Gulripshi District is the tallest in the Caucasus, standing 2.5 metres (8 ft 2 in) or 2.6 metres (8 ft 6 in) tall. Its slabs are 50 centimetres (20 in) thick and the diameter of the circular hole is 41 centimetres (16 in). The whole structure weighs almost 150 tons.

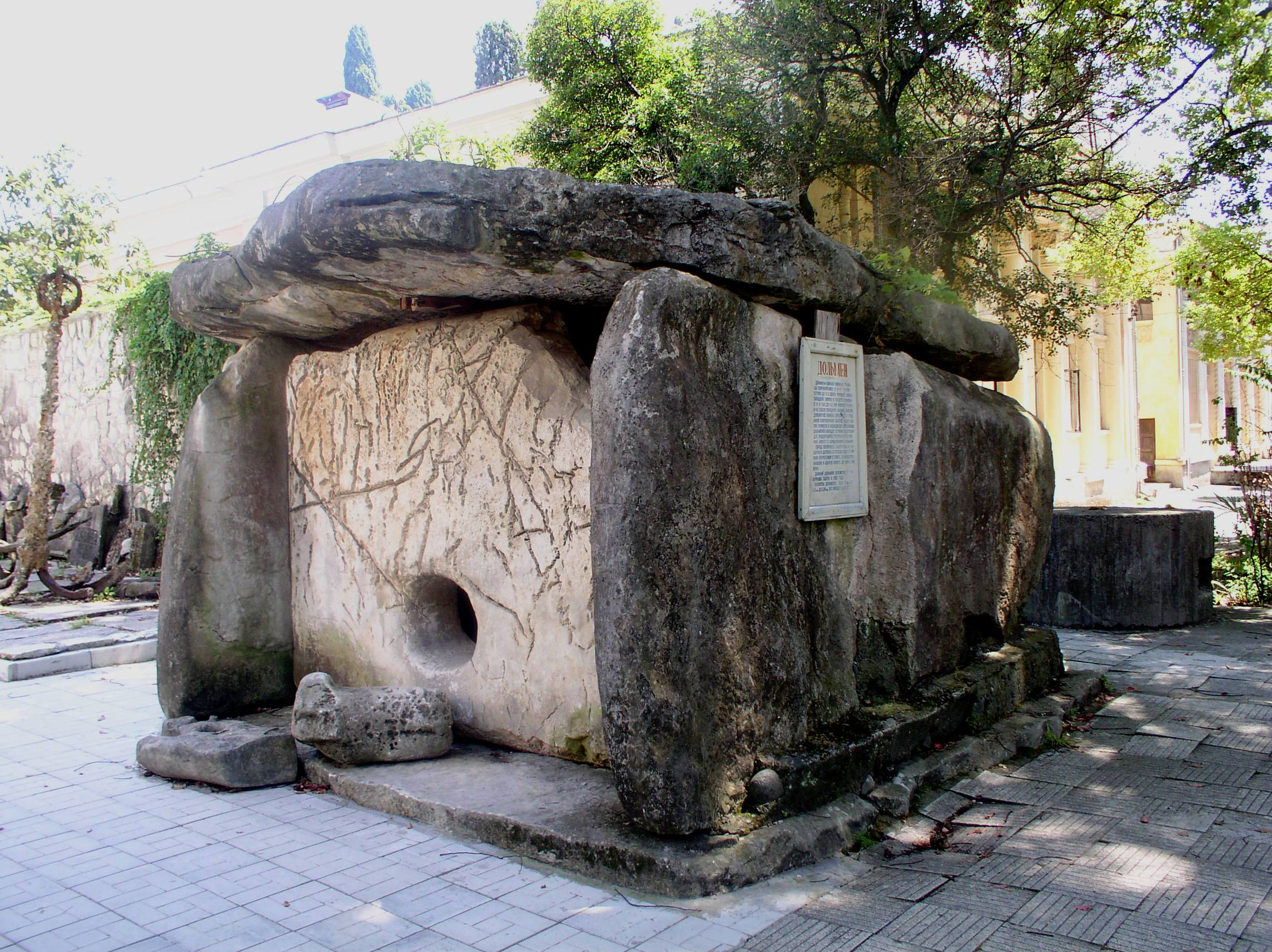
The dolmen in the Sukhumi Museum.

There are around 15 dolmens in the vicinity of the village of Eshera, built around the 3rd or 2nd millennium BC. One of these was moved to the Sukhumi Museum. A dolmen of Abkhazia is also exhibited at the Georgian National Museum in Tbilisi.

Other dolmens exist at the village of Otkhara (near the Otkhara Cave Monastery Complex); the limestone walls remain, thought the capstone roofs are missing.

== Purpose ==
The dolmens in Abkhazia seem to have been family burials, the earliest of which were constructed in the 3rd millennium BC and the largest of which date to the Middle Bronze Age, probably the first half of the 1st millennium BC. Archaeological artifacts found in the dolmens include axes, spear tips, various headpieces, and pottery.

== Preservation concerns ==
Georgia has added the dolmens of Abkhazia to its list of cultural heritage and reported a threat of destruction due to the lack of adequate conservation.
