= Givi Agrba =

Abkhaz politician (1937–2014)

Head of the State Security Service of Abkhazia
- In office 2 April 2003 – 7 July 2004
- President: Vladislav Ardzinba
- Preceded by: Zurab Agumava
- Succeeded by: Mikhail Tarba

Chief of the General Staff of Abkhazia
- In office 1996–2002
- President: Vladislav Ardzinba

Minister of Internal Affairs of Abkhazia
- In office 1993 – 2 June 1996
- President: Vladislav Ardzinba
- Preceded by: Alexander Ankvab
- Succeeded by: Almasbei Kchach

Personal details
- Born: 4 April 1937 Kulanyrchua, Gudauta District, Abkhaz ASSR, Georgian SSR, Soviet Union
- Died: 27 August 2014 (aged 77) Sukhumi, Abkhazia
- Education: Sukhumi Pedagogical Institute

Givi Kamugovich Agrba (Russian: Гиви Камугович Агрба; 4 April 1937 – 27 August 2014) was a politician from Abkhazia.

== Early life ==
Agrba was born on 4 April 1937 in the village of Kulanyrchua, Gudauta District. He attended school in Lykhny and studied in the philological faculty of the Sukhumi Pedagogical Institute, the only university in Abkhazia.

== Career ==
Agrba became Minister of Internal Affairs of Abkhazia in 1993, after the war with Georgia. On 2 June 1996, President Vladislav Ardzinba dismissed him for unsatisfactory work, replacing him with the head of his own security office Almasbei Kchach. From 1996 until 2002, Agrba was Deputy Defence Minister and Chief of the General Staff. He was awarded the rank of Major in 1996 and Lieutenant General in 1998. He subsequently became advisor to President Ardzinba on Military Matters, and on 2 April 2003, was appointed Head of the State Security Service, replacing Zurab Agumava. On 15 June 2004, Agrba handed in his resignation along with Foreign Minister Sergei Shamba and First Vice Premier Astamur Tarba following the murder of opposition politician Garri Aiba. President Ardzinba accepted Agrba's resignation on 7 July and replaced him with Mikhail Tarba.

== Death ==
Agrba suddenly died on 27 August 2014 in Sukhumi.
