= Pskhu-Gumista Strict Nature Reserve =

Protected nature area in Georgia (country)

- IUCN category Ia (strict nature reserve)
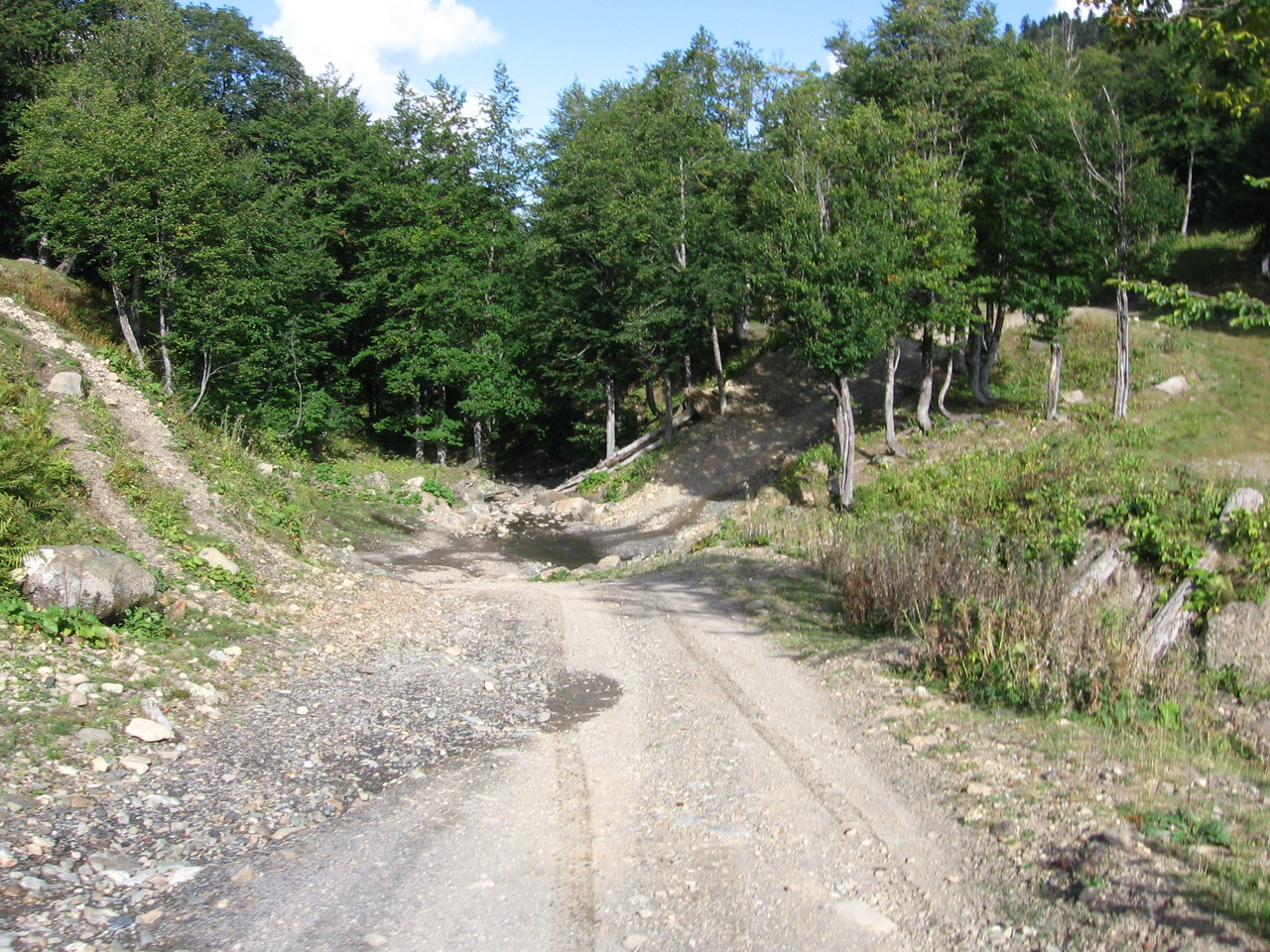
- Road to Pskhu.

- Location within Georgia Location within Abkhazia
- Location: Abkhazia, Georgia
- Coordinates: 43°20′44″N 41°00′29″E
- Area: 733.48 km^{2} (283.20 sq mi)
- Established: 1941
- Governing body: Agency of Protected Areas
- Website: Strict Nature Reserve Info

Pskhu-Gumista Strict Nature Reserve (Russian; Псху-Гумистинский заповедник, Georgian: ფსხუ-გუმისთის სახელმწიფო ნაკრძალი) is a protected area in the Sukhumi District of Abkhazia, Georgia. The primary goal of the reserve is to protect flora and fauna of the area, including the surrounding mountainous region.

== History ==
Control over this area frequently changed during the 20th century. The Russian Federation established the 'Pskhu-Gumista Reserve' in 1941. In 1978, the size of the protected territory was significantly enlarged to include the area in the Bzyb River gorge and Pskhu river gorge. After Georgia re-established its independence in 1991, the modern Pskhu-Gumista Strict Nature Reserve was created. With the outbreak of the Abkhaz–Georgian conflict and subsequent war, de facto control is presently maintained by the government of Abkhazia.

== Geography ==
The Pskhu-Gumista Strict Nature Reserve is in the mountainous area of Abkhazia on the southern slope of the Greater Caucasus range. This reserve consists of the Gumista Nature Reserve of 13,400 hectares in the Gumista River gorge and the Pskhu Nature Reserve of 27,334 hectares in the Pskhu river gorge and the Bzyb River gorge.

== Climate ==
Proximity to the Black Sea and the shield of the Caucasus Mountains creates a very mild climate with heavy precipitation, though humidity decreases further inland. At higher elevations, the climate varies from maritime mountainous to cold without a distinct summer season. The region always receives a significant amount of snow in winter.

== Flora ==
The protected area of Euxine-Colchic deciduous forests has many endemic specimens.

== Fauna ==
Mammals in the area include Caucasian red deer (Cervus elaphus maral), West Caucasian tur (Capra caucasica), Rupicapra, Capreolus, wild boar, Caucasian wildcat (Felis silvestris caucasica), stone marten and European rabbit.

In 2026 it is planned to reintroduce, the European bison (Bison bonasus) with 6 bison to the reserve. These bison will be transferred from populations in Adygea.

== See also ==
- Bzyb River
- Gumista River
