= Lekukhona Saint Charalambos Church =

Church in Lekukhona, Abkhazia, Georgia

Lekukhona Saint Charalambos Church ლეკუხონის წმინდა ხარლაპის ეკლესია (in Georgian)
- Location within Abkhazia Location within Georgia

Religion
- Affiliation: Georgian Orthodox
- District: Sokhumi Municipality
- Province: Abkhazia

Location
- Location: (Georgia (country)) Lekukhona, Sokhumi Municipality, Abkhazia, Georgia
- Interactive map of Lekukhona Saint Charalambos Church ლეკუხონის წმინდა ხარლაპის ეკლესია (in Georgian)
- Coordinates: 43°02′05″N 41°09′03″E

Architecture
- Type: Church
- Completed: 1911

Lekukhona Saint Charalambos Church (Georgian: ლეკუხონის წმინდა ხარლაპის ეკლესია) is a church in the village of Lekukhona, Sokhumi municipality, Autonomous Republic of Abkhazia, Georgia.

== History ==
The church was built in 1911.
