= Mtiskalta Church =

Ruined church in Abkhazia

Mtiskalta Church მთისკალთის ეკლესია(in Georgian)
- Location within Abkhazia Location within Georgia

Religion
- Affiliation: Georgian Orthodox
- Province: Abkhazia
- Ecclesiastical or organizational status: ruins

Location
- Location: (Georgia (country)) Mtiskalta, Sokhumi Municipality, Abkhazia, Georgia
- Interactive map of Mtiskalta Church მთისკალთის ეკლესია(in Georgian)
- Coordinates: 43°07′38″N 41°02′52″E

Architecture
- Type: Church
- Completed: 19th–20th centuries

Mtiskalta Church (Georgian: მთისკალთის ეკლესია) is the church ruins on the left bank of the river East Gumist in the village of Mtiskalta, Sokhumi municipality, Autonomous Republic of Abkhazia, Georgia. The church was built in the 19th and 20th centuries. The church walls are in a heavy physical condition and need urgent conservation. Not to be confused with nearby Mtiskalta Church of the Transfiguration built in the 19th century.
