= Odishi Saint Constantine Church =

Church in Odishi, Autonomous Republic of Abkhazia, Georgia

Odishi Saint Constantine Church ოდიშის წმინდა კონსტანტინეს ეკლესია (in Georgian)
- Location within Abkhazia Location within Georgia

Religion
- Affiliation: Georgian Orthodox
- District: Sokhumi Municipality
- Province: Abkhazia
- Ecclesiastical or organizational status: ruins

Location
- Location: (Georgia (country)) Odishi Sokhumi Municipality, Abkhazia, Georgia
- Interactive map of Odishi Saint Constantine Church ოდიშის წმინდა კონსტანტინეს ეკლესია (in Georgian)
- Coordinates: 43°04′15″N 41°06′00″E

Architecture
- Type: Church
- Completed: Middle Ages

Odishi Saint Constantine Church (Georgian: ოდიშის წმინდა კონსტანტინეს ეკლესია) is a church in the village of Odishi, Sokhumi municipality, Autonomous Republic of Abkhazia, Georgia.

== History ==
The church was built in the Middle Ages.
