= Berulava =

Berulava (Georgian: ბერულავა) is a Georgian surname. Notable people with the surname include:

- Alexander Berulava (1945–1993), Georgian journalist, writer, and human rights activist
- Gennadi Berulava (1942–2013), Abkhaz politician
- Luka Berulava (born 2002), Georgian pair skater
- Mikhail Berulava (born 1950), Russian scientist and politician
