= Nakhshiri Saint Panagia Church =

Church ruins in Abkhazia, Georgia

Nakhshiri Saint Panagia Church ნახშირის წმინდა პანაიას ეკლესია (in Georgian)
- Location within Abkhazia Location within Georgia

Religion
- Affiliation: Georgian Orthodox
- District: Sokhumi Municipality
- Province: Abkhazia
- Ecclesiastical or organizational status: ruins

Location
- Location: (Georgia (country)) Nakhshiri Sokhumi Municipality, Abkhazia, Georgia
- Interactive map of Nakhshiri Saint Panagia Church ნახშირის წმინდა პანაიას ეკლესია (in Georgian)
- Coordinates: 43°06′15″N 41°07′30″E

Architecture
- Type: Church
- Completed: 11th century

Nakhshiri Saint Panagia Church (Georgian: ნახშირის წმინდა პანაიას ეკლესია) is a church ruins in the village of Nakhshiri, Sokhumi municipality, Autonomous Republic of Abkhazia, Georgia. In the same village there is also the 20th century Saint Ilya Church.

== History ==
The church was built in the Middle Ages. The church walls are in poor physical condition and need urgent conservation.
