= Nakhshiri Saint Ilya Church =

Church in Nakhshiri, Abkhazia, Georgia

Nakhshiri Saint Ilya Church ნახშირის წმინდა ილიას ეკლესია (in Georgian)
- Location within Abkhazia Location within Georgia

Religion
- Affiliation: Georgian Orthodox
- District: Sokhumi Municipality
- Province: Abkhazia

Location
- Location: (Georgia (country)) Nakhshiri Sokhumi Municipality, Abkhazia, Georgia
- Interactive map of Nakhshiri Saint Ilya Church ნახშირის წმინდა ილიას ეკლესია (in Georgian)
- Coordinates: 43°06′20″N 41°06′30″E

Architecture
- Type: Church
- Completed: 20th century

Nakhshiri Saint Ilya Church (Georgian: ნახშირის წმინდა ილიას ეკლესია) is a church in the village of Nakhshiri, Sokhumi municipality, Autonomous Republic of Abkhazi, Georgia. In the same village there are also ruins of Middle Ages Saint Panagia Church.

== History ==
The church was built in the 20th century.
