= Pskhu =

Village in Abkhazia, Georgia

Pskhu Georgian: ფსხუ Abkhaz: Ҧсҳәы
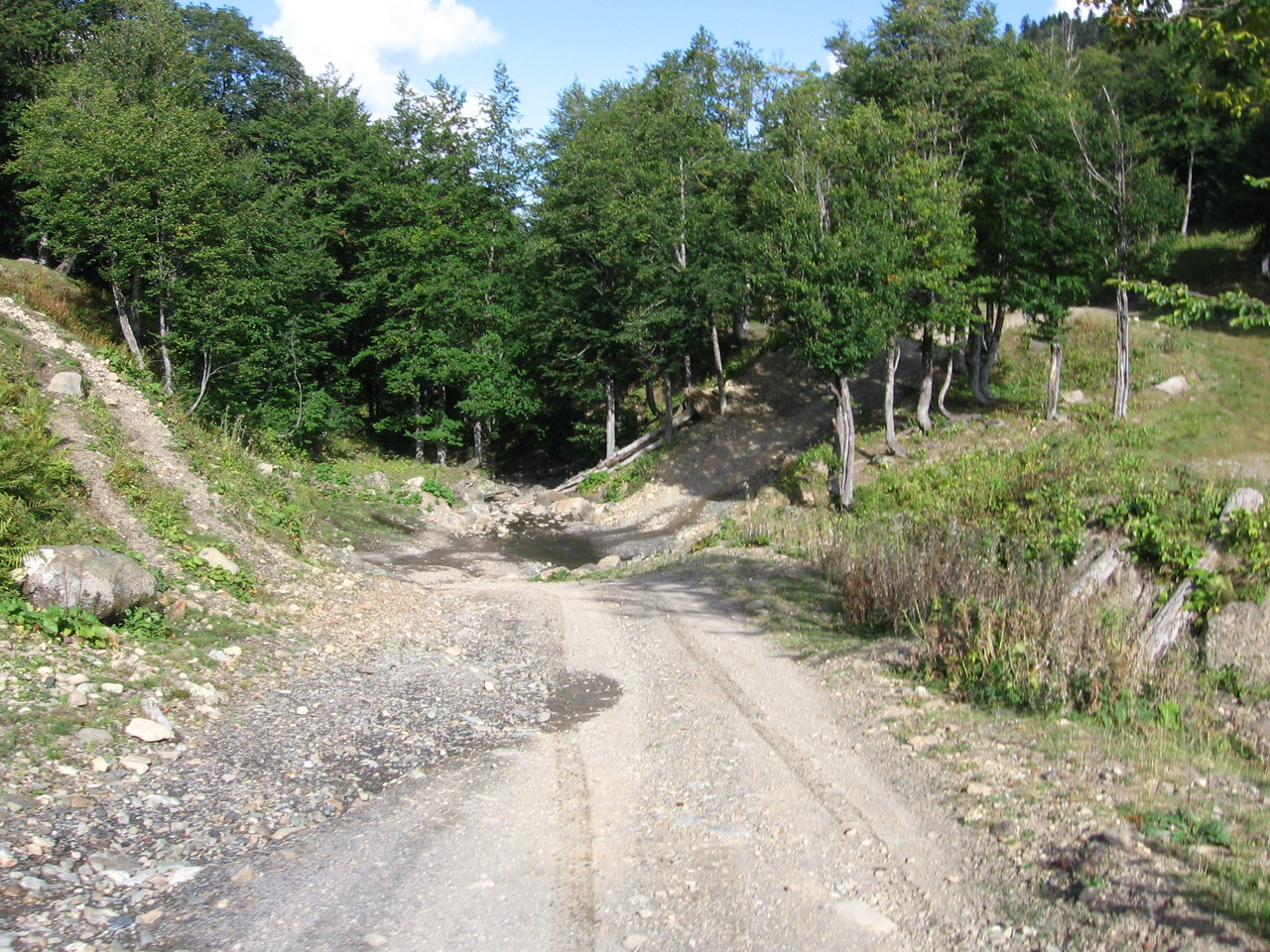
- Mountain road to Pskhu

- Location within Georgia Location within Abkhazia
- Coordinates: 43°23′23″N 40°48′48″E
- Country: Georgia
- Partially recognized independent country: Abkhazia (Note: The political status of Abkhazia is disputed. Having unilaterally declared independence from Georgia in 1992, Abkhazia is formally recognised as an independent state by 4 UN member states (three other states previously recognised it but then withdrew their recognition), while the remainder of the international community recognizes it as de jure Georgian territory. Georgia continues to claim the area as its own territory, designating it as Russian-occupied territory.)
- District: Sukhumi

Population (2011)
  - Total: 189
- Time zone: UTC+3 (MSK)
  - Summer (DST): UTC+4

Pskhu (Russian: Псху, Pskhu; Abkhaz: Ҧсҳәы, Ps'hwy; Georgian: ფსხუ, Pskhu) is a village in the Sukhumi District of Abkhazia, a disputed region on the Black Sea coast. Its population was about 150 (as of 2005) with ethnic Russians constituting a majority. The village is situated in the eponymous valley between the Greater Caucasus and Bzyb ranges. The river Bzyb and several of its tributaries flow near the village. The valley was inhabited by the Abazins tribe which was one of the last peoples of the Caucasus to be conquered by Russia. After their subjection in 1864 almost all of them escaped to Turkey; many perished on the Black Sea coast from hunger and malaria, during the transportation to Ottoman Empire. Pskhu was the only settlement in the Transcaucasia to be occupied by Wehrmacht during the Battle of the Caucasus of World War II in the autumn of 1942.

The small hydro-electric power station supplies the energy to the village. The Pskhu HPP and surrounding electrical infrastructure has recently been renovated in 2025 by RUE Chernomorenergo, with further upgrades planned in 2026.

Pskhu also has an airport with grass-covered surface. There are no regular flights although it is still used occasionally by tourists and by the local inhabitants.

Several dolmens and the ruins of the medieval fortress remained near Pskhu. The nearby Inal-kuba (Pskhu-Nykha) mountain (1290 m) is one of the seven shrines of the Abkhaz people.

== Demographics ==
At the time of the 2011 Census, Pskhu had a population of 189. Of these, 91.0% were Russians and 9.0% Abkhazians.

== See also ==
- Sukhumi District
- Pskhu-Gumista Strict Nature Reserve
