= Almasbei Kchach =

Abkhaz politician

Secretary of the Security Council of Abkhazia
- In office 6 June 2003 – 17 February 2005
- President: Vladislav Ardzinba
- Preceded by: Astamur Tarba
- Succeeded by: Stanislav Lakoba

Minister of Internal Affairs of Abkhazia
- In office 1 November 2001 – 8 May 2003
- President: Vladislav Ardzinba
- Prime Minister: Anri Jergenia; Gennadi Gagulia
- Preceded by: Zurab Agumava
- Succeeded by: Abesalom Beia
- In office 2 June 1996 – 2 July 2001
- President: Vladislav Ardzinba
- Prime Minister: Gennadi Gagulia; Sergei Bagapsh; Viacheslav Tsugba
- Preceded by: Givi Agrba
- Succeeded by: Zurab Agumava

Personal details
- Born: 19 September 1958 Gudauta District, Georgian SSR, Soviet Union
- Died: 17 April 2012 (aged 53) Gagra, Abkhazia

Almasbei Ivanovich Kchach (Russian: Алмасбей Иванович Кчач) was a former government member and vice-presidential candidate from Abkhazia who committed suicide when investigators came to arrest him in connection with an assassination attempt on President Alexander Ankvab.

== Political career under President Ardzinba ==
On 2 June 1996, President Vladislav Ardzinba appointed Almasbei Kchach to succeed Givi Agrba as interior minister. Kchach had up until that point been head of Ardzinba's own security office. He remained in that position until 2 July 2001, when he was replaced by Supreme Court Judge Zurab Agumava. However, Kchach again became interior minister on 1 November after Agumava was appointed to head the State Security Service.

On 8 May 2003, after the appointment of Raul Khajimba as prime minister, Kchach was again replaced as interior minister, by Abesalom Beia. On 6 June, he was appointed Secretary of the Security Council, succeeding Astamur Tarba who had been made Vice-Premier. Kchach stayed on in this position until the end of Ardzinba's presidency in 2005.

== Member of the opposition ==
After Sergei Bagapsh succeeded Vladislav Ardzinba as president in 2005, Almasbei Kchach joined the new opposition and unsuccessfully participated in a number of elections. In the 2007 parliamentary elections, he made it to the second round of the election in the eighth constituency (Pitsunda), but narrowly lost the run-off with 1195 to 1263 votes. In the 2009 presidential election Kchach ran as vice presidential candidate under businessman Beslan Butba. The pair came in fourth place with 8.25% of the vote share. Kchach again tried to win constituency number eight in the 2012 parliamentary elections, but failed to pass the first round, achieving a 24.90% third place.
