= Besleti Bridge =

Besleti Bridge ბესლეთის ხიდი
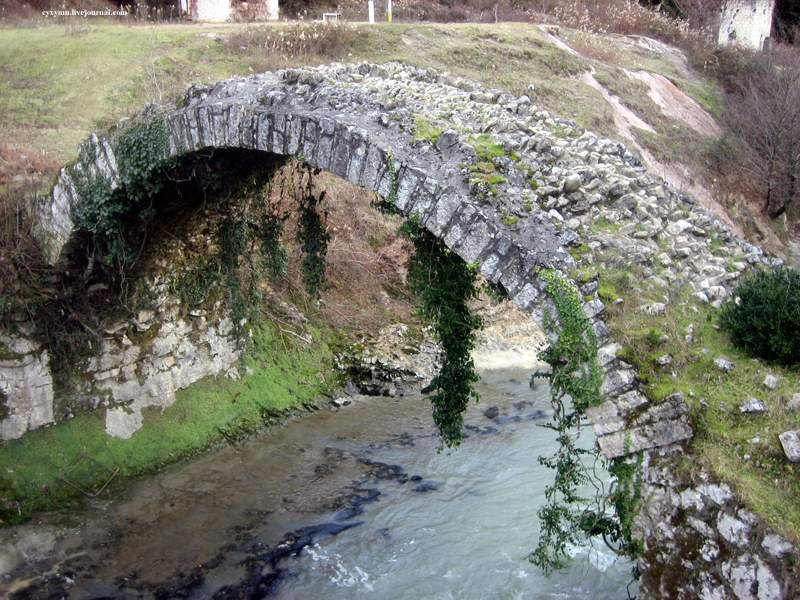
- Queen Tamar's Bridge
- Coordinates: 43.03064°N 41.07610°E
- Crosses: Besletka River
- Locale: Georgia
- Other name: Queen Tamar's Bridge
- Heritage status

Immovable Cultural Monument of National Significance of Georgia
- Official name: Besleti Bridge
- Designated: November 7, 2006; 19 years ago
- Item Number in Cultural Heritage Portal: 9821
- Date of entry in the registry: October 1, 2007; 18 years ago

Characteristics
- Design: arched stone bridge
- Material: Stone

Location
- Interactive map of Besleti Bridge

The Besleti Bridge (Georgian: ბესლეთის ხიდი) also known as Queen Tamar's Bridge (Georgian: თამარის ხიდი) is a medieval arched stone bridge at Sukhumi, Georgia’s breakaway republic of Abkhazia.

Located some 6 km from the city centre, the bridge spans the small mountain River Besletka, and dates back to the late 12th century. Thirty-five meters in overall length (the arch itself is 13.3 m) and eight meters high, this single-arch bridge is one of the most illustrative examples of the medieval bridge design popular during the reign of Tamar of Georgia (r. 1184-1213) who is traditionally credited to have commissioned the construction of the Beslet bridge. A contemporary inscription in the early Georgian asomtavruli alphabet reads: "Christ the Lord, glorify in every possible way in both lives." An engraved cross and the Greek Τ have survived in the lower part of the left pillar of the bridge. A stone stele with Georgian inscriptions stood at the head of the bridge, but was lost during the War in Abkhazia early in the 1990s. In the vicinity of the bridge are ruins of medieval defense towers, a testimony to strategic importance of the locality.

Bridge of Besleti has been given the status of national importance monument.

== Sources ==
- (in Georgian) Tsitsishvili, I., Ukleba, D. "Besleti", in: Georgian Soviet Encyclopedia, vol. 2, pp. 341–2. Tbilisi, 1977
- (in English) Lidiia Dubinskaia (1985), The Soviet Union: A Guide & Reference Book, p. 283. Raduga Publishers
- Cultural heritage in Abkhazia, Tbilisi, 2015
