= Georgi Gulia =

Abkhazian writer and artist

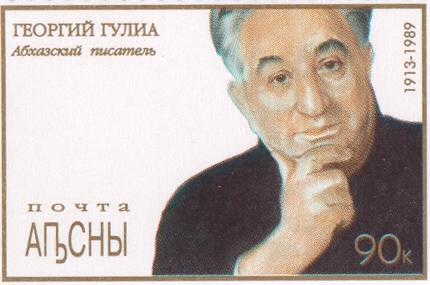
Gulia on a 1998 stamp of Abkhazia

Georgi Dmitrievich Gulia (Abkhaz: Гьаргь Дырмит-иԥа Гәлиа; 1913–1989) was an Abkhazian writer and artist.

He was born in Sukhumi, the son of the writer Dmitri Gulia who was one of the founders of modern Abkhaz literature. After graduating from the Transcaucasian Institute of Railway Engineers, he worked in the construction of the Black Sea Railway. From his youth, he was engaged in journalism, painting, etc. In 1930, his first story "На скате" was published; he continued to write short stories and stories for children in the following years. He became a member of the Soviet Communist Party in 1940.

After the Great Patriotic War, he moved to Moscow, where he was invited to work in the editorial office of the Literaturnaya Gazeta. In 1947, he decided to write a major work dedicated to modern Abkhaz youth. He traveled to the cities and villages of Abkhazia, met people and collected material. In 1948, the novel Spring in Saken was published in the literary magazine Novy Mir. This brought the writer public recognition and fame. He wrote two more books in the Saken trilogy: The Good City (1949) and Kama (1951). In 1950, the film version of Spring in Saken was released, directed by N.K.Sanishvili.

Later in his career, Gulia wrote extensively in the genre of historical fiction. He also wrote fictional biographies of Alexander Blok, Mikhail Lermontov, Omar Khayyam, Rembrandt and his father Dmitri Gulia.

He died in 1989 and is buried in Sukhumi. He was married to Valentina Grigorievna Knyaginina and they had two Tatyana and Georgy.
