= 6th convocation of the Sukhumi City Council =

The 6th convocation of the Sukhumi City Council has been in office since 13 April 2016.

== Formation ==
=== 2016 City Council election ===
The 2011 City Council election was contested by 82 candidates in 26 single-seat constituencies. Among the candidates were 14 sitting members of the City Council, including incumbent Chairman Konstantin Pilia. Of these, 5 were re-elected, including Pilia. One of the 18 female candidates was elected.

=== Reruns in constituencies no. 21 and no. 23 ===
The elections in constituencies no. 21 and no. 23 had to be repeated as turnout had been below 25%. The rerun elections on 29 May were won by Temur Arshba and Said Adleiba, respectively, who had also participated originally.

== Composition ==
=== Leadership ===
On 13 April, Konstantin Pilia was re-elected as chairman during the council's first session, defeating newly elected member Daur Eshba in a secret ballot. Eshba received thirteen votes in favour, one short of the fourteen required, eight against and three abstentions. Pilia then received seventeen votes, with five against and two abstentions. Mizan Zantaria was subsequently elected Deputy Chairman with one abstention.

During the Assembly's first and second sessions (the latter held on 19 April), commissions were formed and their leaders elected: Inna Kvarchia headed Education, Adamyr Lagvilava Housing and Communal Services, David Mirzoyan Health, Vitali Chitanava Physical Culture and Sport, Jon Smyr Veteran Affairs and Public Order, Daur Eshba Social Policy, Bagrat Zantaria Economy and Forecasting, Denis Inapshba Architecture and Construction, Georgi Shakaia Culture, Ardashes Ovsepyan Youth Policy and Lasha Ashuba Budget.

=== List of members ===
#	Name	Position	Notes
1	Georgi Shakaia	Chairman of the Commission for Culture	
2	Lasha Ashuba	Chairman of the Commission for Budget	
3	Inna Kvarchia	Chairman of the Commission for Education	
4	Daur Delba		
5	Dmitri Marshania		
6	Astamur Kutarba		
7	Mizan Zantaria	Deputy Chairman	
8	Konstantin Pilia	Chairman	
9	Dmitri Gunba		
10	Bagrat Zantaria	Chairman of the Commission for Economy and Forecasting	
11	Semen Bzhania		
12	Daur Eshba	Chairman of the Commission for Social Policy	
13	Leon Gubaz		
14	David Mirzoyan	Chairman of the Commission for Health	
15	Timur Shapkovski		
16	Ardashes Ovsepyan	Chairman of the Commission for Youth Policy	
17	Irakli Kharchilava		
18	Jon Smyr	Chairman of the Commission for Veteran Affairs and Public Order	
19	Narsou Salakaia		
20	Vitali Chitanava	Chairman of the Commission for Physical Culture and Sport	
21	Temur Arshba		
22	Leonid Gvinjia		
23	Said Adleiba		
24	Roman Tskua		
25	Denis Inapshba	Chairman of the Commission for Architecture and Construction	
26	Adamyr Lagvilava	Chairman of the Commission for Housing and Communal Services	
