= Zaur Avidzba =

Abkhazian politician (1953–2015)

Zaur Avidzba (1953–2015) was a politician and businessman from Abkhazia who was murdered in 2015.

== Early career ==
In 1993, Avidzba was appointed Deputy Minister for Defence.

== Member of Parliament ==
On 8 February 2011, veteran Parliamentarian Vladimir Nachach died after a long illness. On 9 March the Central Election Commission decided that the by-election to elect Nachach's successor in constituency no. 16 would be held on 30 April. Zaur Avidzba was one of three candidates to be nominated by an initiative group, and he won the election with 1028 votes to 753 and 166.

In the 2012 elections, Avidzba failed to be re-elected. He won a 33.76% first round plurality against i.a. former Prime Minister Anri Jergenia, but lost the second round to Leonid Chamagua.

== Murder ==
On 20 October 2015 at 7:35am local time the Ministry for Internal Affairs was informed with a phone call of a burning car in Gudauta's Pushkin Street. In the car, a Mercedes S-600, the corpse of Avidzba was found with burn and bullet wounds along with four spent 7.62mm cartridges.

On 22 October, a suspect was detained who confessed to the murder and identified the murder weapon.
