= Hadzhera Avidzba =

Background information
- Born: 24 January 1917; Abkhazia
- Died: 20 August 1997 (aged 80)
- Genres: Classical
- Occupations: Musician, Teacher
- Instrument: Piano
- Years active: 1934–1979

Hadzhera Avidzba, (Russian: Хаджера Авидзба; 24 January 1917 – 20 August 1997) was Abkhazia's first professional female pianist. She was a teacher, as well as a performer, and was Head of Lvov Musical College from 1951–1965.

== Biography ==
Avidzba, along with her twin sister Meri, was born on 24 January 1917. In 1930 a new Musical Technical School was opened in Sukhumi. One of its first graduates in 1934 was Avidzba, who specialised in piano. Following her graduation, she began her career as a piano teacher working there, making her Abkhazia's first female professional pianist.

During the Great Patriotic War, Avidzba performed in hospitals for wounded soldiers. She continued to teach alongside her war work until 1946, when she moved to Lviv to teach at the conservatoire there. From 1951 to 1965 she was head of Lviv Musical College, after which period she continued to teach there. She was a leading figure in the formation and development of Abkhazian musical culture.

Avidzba's performance repertoire included works by Mozart, Schumann, Rachmaninov, Prokofiev, amongst others. She died on 20 August 1997.
