= Gennadi Berulava =

Abkhaz politician (1942–2013)

Gennadi Berulava became head of Abkhazia's State Security Service after the outbreak of the 1992-1993 war with Georgia. He had been Deputy Head under his predecessor, Grigori Komoshvili, since 1985. In early October 1993, after the war had ended, he was dismissed and succeeded by Astamur Tarba.

Berulava was born on 19 November 1942 in Sukhumi, and died in April 2013.
