= Otkhara Cave Monastery Complex =

Group of caves at the foot of the Bzyb Range in Abkhazia

Otkhara
- Mchishta
- Location within Abkhazia Location within Georgia
- Coordinates: 43°14′27″N 40°29′56″E
- Elevation: 600 m

The Otkhara cave complex is a group of caves at the foot of the Bzyb Range in Abkhazia, a breakaway region of Georgia. It is located on a steep rock near the village of Otkhara, some 20 km northwest of the town of Gudauta. The caves are also known as those of Mchishta after a karst river effluxing from the base of the rock. The openings are at least partially artificial. Local legends and a scholarly hypothesis suggest religious use in the Middle Ages, but the exact function and timing remains unknown.

== Description ==
The cave entrances are located at a height of several meters above the ground surface and arranged in several tiers. They are rectangular in shape, ostensibly human-hewn, and faced by stones, joined together with lime mortar. Each of these caves is a narrow grotto of about 2 to 3 meters in width, but as high as 15 meters. Wooden details of rock-hewn openings have survived. According to local legends, the caves used to house a community of monks, but later it was used as a shelter for brigands. In the latter half of the 19th century, a nobleman from Otkhara, Mazhar Shervashidze, led a group of locals in an attempt to explore the caves. He was able to ascend the first tier and reportedly recovered a couple of silver objects, the subsequent fate of which is unknown. It was only in 1958 that the caves were first explored scientifically, by a group of specialists from Tbilisi with the help of rock climbers. Several utensils of everyday use found in the caves are dated to the 13th–14th century.
