= Eshera =

Eshera ეშერა, Ешыра, Эшера
- Village
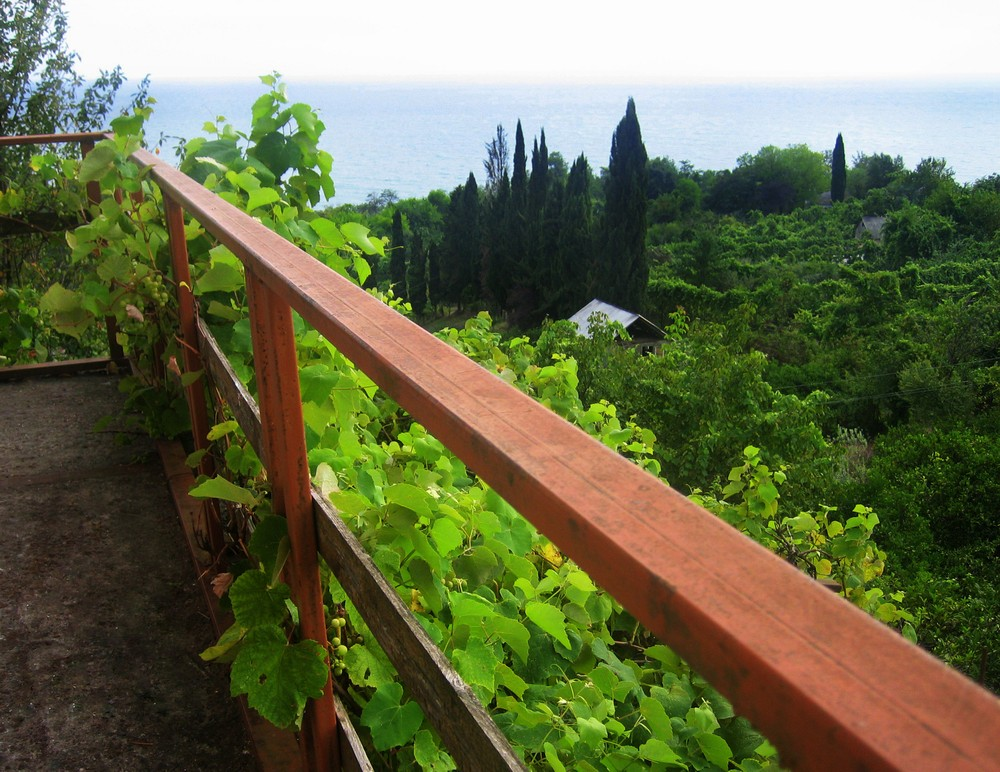

- Location in Abkhazia

- Location in Georgia
- Coordinates: 43°2′26″N 40°56′9″E
- Country: Georgia
- Partially recognized independent country: Abkhazia
- District: Sukhumi
- Elevation: 30 m (98 ft)

Population (2011)
  - Total: 2,141
- Time zone: UTC+4 (GET)

Eshera (Georgian: ეშერა; Abkhaz: Ешыра; Russian: Эшера) is a village in the Sukhumi District in Abkhazia, Georgia. It is a climatic-balneotherapeutic resort on the Black Sea coast, at the right side of Gumista river. Its altitude above sea level is around 30 m, the distance to Sukhumi is 16 km. Once a part of the Abkhazian ASSR of the Georgian SSR, Eshera has been controlled by the de facto independent Republic of Abkhazia since 1993.

In 1877, the village was home to 293 families (1,050 people in total), who fled to the Ottoman Empire after a failed rebellion against Russia.

The Abkhaz Census of 2011 reported that Eshera had a population of 2,141. The ethnic makeup was 40.9% Abkhaz, 40.8% Armenians and 10.9% Russians. Other minorities included Georgians (1.9%), Ukrainians (1.2%) and Greeks (0.6%).

The existence of Greek colonies are assumed in the vicinity of the Eshera. In addition, many fragments of Greek pottery, date back to the 6th century BC, have been found in the village.

Vladislav Ardzinba was born in Eshera.

== See also ==
- Dolmens of Abkhazia
- Sukhumi District

== Sources ==
- Georgian Soviet Encyclopedia, T. 4, p. 257-258, Tbilisi., 1979.
