= Meri Avidzba =

First Abkhaziyan woman pilot

- Avidzba, c. 1943
- Born: 24 January 1917; Abkhazia, Russian Empire
- Died: 12 April 1986 (aged 69); Sukhumi, Georgian SSR, Soviet Union
- Military career
- Allegiance: Soviet Union
- Branch: Soviet Air Force
- Service years: 1941–1945
- Rank: Lieutenant
- Unit: 46th Guards Night Bomber Aviation Regiment
- Conflicts: World War II
- Awards: Order of the Patriotic War
- Other work: Deputy of the Supreme Soviet of Abkhazia

Meri Hafizovna Avidzba (Abkhaz: Мери Ҳафиз-иԥҳа Аҩӡба; Russian: Мери Хафизовна Авидзба; 24 January 1917 – 12 April 1986) was a Soviet military pilot and navigator and was the first female aviator from Abkhazia. She was awarded two medals for her actions in the Great Patriotic War (1941–1945), where she served as a navigator of the 46th Taman Guards Night Bomber Aviation Regiment, known by the Germans as the Night Witches. Later in her life, she was elected a Deputy of the Supreme Soviet of Abkhazia.

== Biography ==
Avidzba and her twin sister Hadzhera were born on 24 January 1917. She attended Sukhumi School No. 10. When Victor Argun, the first male Abkhazian pilot, came to recruit aviators, Avidzba initially missed the opportunity. She later joined the Red Banner School of the Civil Air Fleet in Bataysk.

After graduating from Bataysk's Flight School, she joined Sukhum Flying Club as an instructor and worked there until it closed in 1939. On 18 August 1936 she flew a demonstration flight in front of spectators to prove her piloting abilities. On 30 December 1936 she circled her plane in a flypast over the funeral of Abkhazian communist leader Nestor Lakoba.

== Military career ==
In 1939, Avidzba joined the Military Medical Academy in Leningrad; when she heard that war was due to be declared she volunteered to transfer to the fighter aircraft training school in Perm. This transition required Avidzba to appeal to the military authorities in order to be transferred. From Perm she moved to the military air school in Engels.

In 1941, she was posted to the Finnish border, where she flew biplanes. In December 1942, Avidzba was posted to the Caucasus region, as a navigator in the 46th Guards Light Bomber Night Aviation Regiment of the 4th Air Army of the 2nd Belarusian Front – beginning her career in the Night Witches. Here she was under the command of Polina Makogon and Lydia Svistunova, where she benefited from their instruction and was quickly undertaking solo combat missions.

In February 1943, she flew with Polina Makogon on a mission, where their three sorties repeatedly bombed the Germans in one night. In September 1943, on a mission to bomb the port of Taman, Avidzba noticed that the Germans were relocating their forces – she reported the reconnaissance findings from her flight to her commanders, who welcomed and acted on this previously unknown intelligence.

In 1944, Avidzba's aircraft was hit by enemy fire, and her spine was severely injured. She hid this injury until the end of the war to continue fighting. This injury led to some partial paralysis, which was successfully treated with an operation seven years later.

During the war, Avidzba flew 477 combat sorties, totalling over 1000 hours of time in the air and dropped 63 tonnes of bombs onto the enemy. She fought in the North Caucasus, as well as on the 4th Ukrainian and 2nd Belorussian fronts. She participated in the liberation of Crimea, Ukraine and Poland. She crossed the front lines on 954 occasions. Her brother Koka was killed in the war, and she wrote to her parents about how her work as a pilot avenged his death.

== Later life ==
After the end of the war, Avidzba returned to Sukhumi, where she was active in the community, particularly in memorialising the Second World War, as well as serving as governor of the school. She was also elected a deputy of the Supreme Soviet of Abkhazia. During her lifetime she was awarded the Orders of the Patriotic War (First and Second Degrees), the "For Defence of the Caucasus" Medal and the "For Victory over Germany" Medal.

Avidzba died on 12 April 1986 in Sukhumi.

== Legacy ==
Avidzba is remembered on stamps issued by the Republic of Abkhazia. Her military papers, flying scarf and other items from her career as pilot were donated by her to the Abkhaz State Museum. There is also a bust of her on display there.
