= Vladimir Avidzba =

Soviet and Abkhaz politician (1937–2020)

Vladimir Jamalovich Avidzba (Russian: Владимир Джамалович Авидзба, Georgian: ვლადიმერ ავიძბა; born 25 June 1937, Verkhnaa Eshera Верхняя Эшера, Abkhazia ASSR, Georgian SSR, USSR — 20 July 2020, Sukhumi, Abkhazia) was a Soviet-Abkhazian political figure and diplomat.

== Biography ==
From February 1994 to 11 July 2014, he served as Abkhazia's plenipotentiary representative to Turkey.

Avidzba was awarded with the Order of the Badge of Honour.

Avidzba died on 20 July 2020.
