= Sukhumi =

Capital city of Abkhazia

Sukhumi Аҟәа (Abkhaz) სოხუმი (Georgian) ცხუმი (Mingrelian) Сухум(и) (Russian) Sokhumi, Sukhum, Aqwa
- City
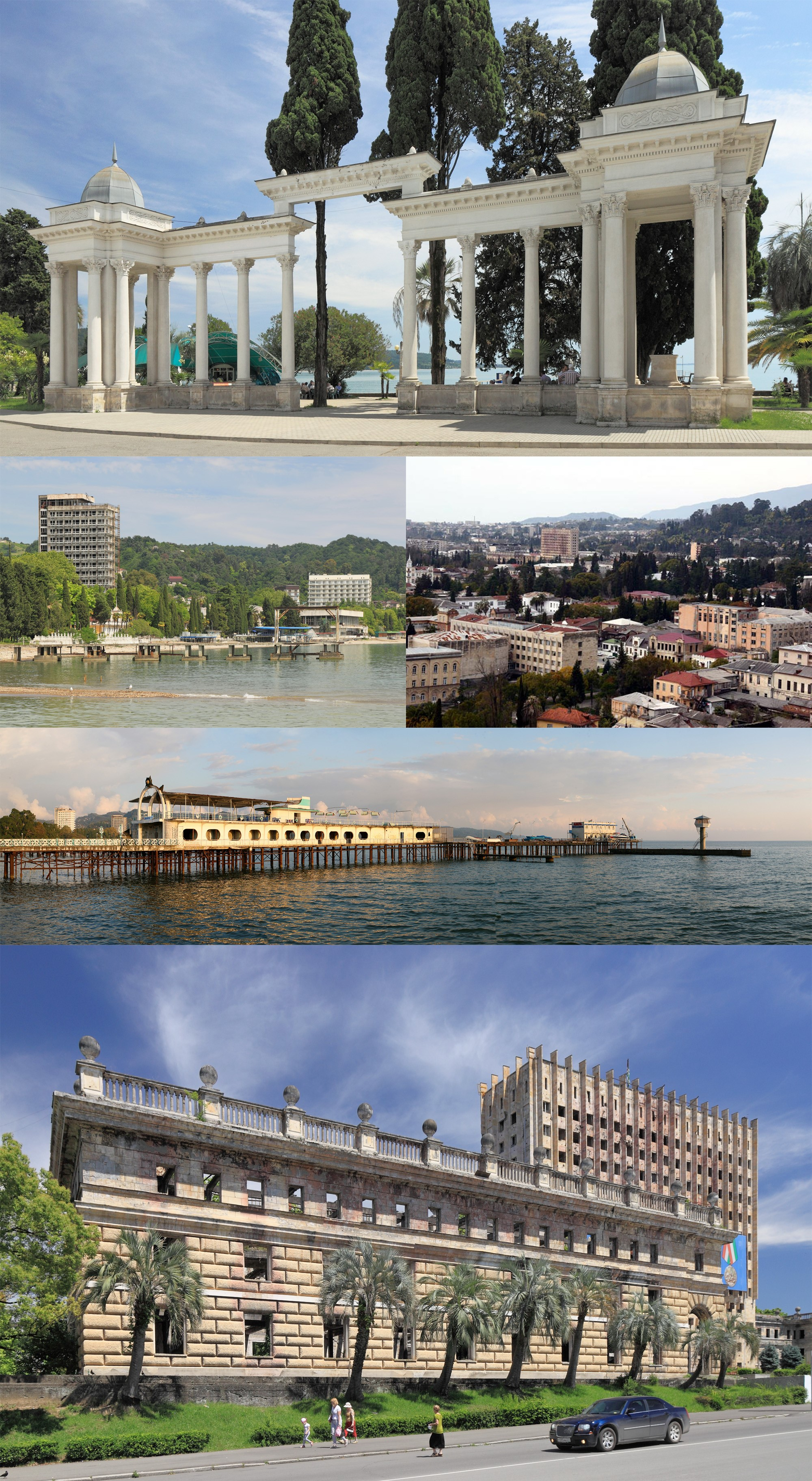
- Colonnade, Embankment, Panoramic, Pier, former building of the Council of Ministers

- Flag Coat of arms

- location of Sukhumi

- Location of Sukhumi in Abkhazia Location of Sukhumi in Georgia
- Coordinates: 43°00′13″N 41°01′09″E
- Country (de jure): Georgia
- Country (de facto): Abkhazia (Note: The political status of Abkhazia is disputed. Having unilaterally declared independence from Georgia in 1992, Abkhazia is formally recognised as an independent state by 4 UN member states (three other states previously recognised it but then withdrew their recognition), while the remainder of the international community recognizes it as de jure Georgian territory. Georgia continues to claim the area as its own territory, designating it as Russian-occupied territory.)
- Settled: 6th century BC
- City status: 1848

Government
  - Mayor: Timur Agrba

Area
  - Total: 372 km^{2} (144 sq mi)
- Highest elevation: 140 m (460 ft)
- Lowest elevation: 5 m (16 ft)

Population (2022 estimate)
  - Total: 65,146
  - Density: 175/km^{2} (454/sq mi)
  - Population in 1989^{†}: 119,150^{†}
- Time zone: UTC+3 (MSK - Georgia Time)
- Postal code: 384900
- Area code: +7 840 22x-xx-xx +995 442 xx-xx-xx
- Vehicle registration: ABH
- Website: Abkhazian administration www.sukhumcity.ru; Georgian administrattion www.abkhazia.gov.ge/cities/SOKHUMI
- † As of the last population census before the 1993 Ethnic cleansing of Georgians in Sukhumi.

Sukhumi or Sokhumi is a city in a wide bay on the Black Sea's eastern coast. It is both the capital and largest city of Abkhazia, a partially recognized state that most countries consider a part of Georgia. The city has been controlled by Abkhazia since the Abkhazian war in 1992–93. The city, which has an airport, is a port, major rail junction and a holiday resort because of its beaches, sanatoriums, mineral-water spas and semitropical climate. It is also a member of the International Black Sea Club.

Sukhumi's history can be traced to the 6th century BC, when it was settled by Greeks, who named it Dioscurias. During this time and the subsequent Roman period, much of the city disappeared under the Black Sea. The city was named Tskhumi when it became part of the Kingdom of Abkhazia and then the Kingdom of Georgia. Contested by local princes, it became part of the Ottoman Empire in the 1570s, where it remained disputed until it was conquered by the Russian Empire in 1810.

After a period of conflict during the Russian Civil War, it briefly became part of the Democratic Republic of Georgia, until it was again taken by the Bolsheviks. Within the Soviet Union, Sukhumi served as the capital of the Socialist Soviet Republic of Abkhazia and then the Abkhaz Autonomous Soviet Socialist Republic within the Georgian SSR. It was also a popular holiday destination. As the Soviet Union dissolved in the early 1990s, the city suffered significant damage during the Abkhaz–Georgian conflict. The present-day population of 60,000 is only half of the population living there toward the end of Soviet rule.

== Toponym ==
In Georgian, the city is known as Sokhumi (სოხუმი), amongst Samurzakanians in Megrelian the city is sometimes referred to as Aqujikha (აყუჯიხა), and in Russian as Сухум (Sukhum) or Сухуми (Sukhumi). The toponym Sokhumi derives from the Georgian word Tskhomi/Tskhumi (ცხომი/ცხუმი), which in turn is supposed to be derived from Svan tskhum (ცხუმ) meaning "hornbeam tree". In Abkhaz, the city is known as Aqwa (Аҟәа) which is believed to derive from a-qwara (а-ҟәара), meaning "stony seashore". According to Abkhaz tradition Aqwa (Аҟәа) signifies water.

Medieval Georgian sources knew the town as Tskhumi (ცხუმი). Later, under Ottoman control, the town was known in Turkish as Suhum-Kale (Ottoman Turkish: صخوم قلعه), which was derived from the earlier Georgian form Tskhumi or read to mean "Tskhumi fortress".

The ending -i in the above forms represents the Georgian nominative suffix. The town was officially called Сухум (Sukhum) in Russian until 16 August 1936, when this was changed to Sukhumi (Сухуми). This remained so until 4 December 1992, when the Supreme Council of Abkhazia restored the previous version. Russia also readopted its official spelling in 2008.

In English, the most common form today is Sukhumi, although Sokhumi is increasing in usage and has been adopted by sources including United Nations, Encyclopædia Britannica, Esri and Google Maps.

== History ==
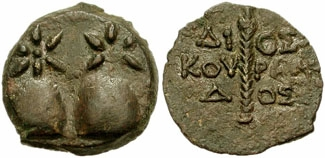
Coin of Dioscurias, late 2nd century BC. Obverse: The caps (pilei) of Dioscuri surmounted by stars; reverse: Thyrsos, ΔΙΟΣΚΟΥΡΙΑΔΟΣ

=== Ancient history ===
The history of the city began in the mid-6th century BC when an earlier settlement of the second and early first millennia BC, frequented by local Colchian tribes, was replaced by the Milesian Greek colony of Dioscurias (Greek: Διοσκουριάς). The city is said to have been founded and named by the Dioscuri, the twins Castor and Pollux of classical mythology. According to another legend it was founded by Amphitus and Cercius of Sparta, the charioteers of the Dioscuri. The Greek pottery found in Eshera, further north along the coast, predates findings in the area of Sukhumi bay by a century suggesting that the centre of the original Greek settlement could have been there.

It became busily engaged in the commerce between Greece and the indigenous tribes, importing salt and wares from many parts of Greece, and exporting local timber, linen, and hemp. It was also a prime center of slave trade in Colchis. The city and its surroundings were remarkable for the multitude of languages spoken in its bazaars.

Although the sea made serious inroads upon the territory of Dioscurias, it continued to flourish and became one of the key cities in the realm of Mithridates VI of Pontus in the 2nd century BC and supported his cause until the end. Dioscurias issued bronze coinage around 100 BC featuring the symbols of the Dioskuri and Dionysus. Under the Roman emperor Augustus the city assumed the name of Sebastopolis (Greek: Σεβαστούπολις). But its prosperity was past, and in the 1st century Pliny the Elder described the place as virtually deserted though the town still continued to exist during the times of Arrian in the 130s. The remains of towers and walls of Sebastopolis have been found underwater; on land the lowest levels so far reached by archaeologists are of the 1st and 2nd centuries AD. According to Gregory of Nyssa there were Christians in the city in the late 4th century. At the beginning of the Lazic War in 542, the Romans evacuated the town and demolished its citadel to prevent it from being captured by the Sasanian Empire. In 565, however, the emperor Justinian I restored the city wall and adorned Sebastopolis with streets and buildings. The city was sacked by the Arab conqueror Marwan II in 736 according to Juansher Juansheriani.

=== Medieval and early modern history ===
Afterwards, the town came to be known as Tskhumi. Restored by the kings of Abkhazia from the Arab devastation, it particularly flourished during the Georgian Golden Age in the 11th–12th centuries, when Tskhumi became the summer residence of the Georgian kings and an important cultural and administrative center of the Georgian state. The city also became a major trade center after the Genoese established their trading port in Tskhumi in the end of 13th century. A Catholic bishopric existed there which is now a titular see. A Genoese consulate was established in 1354 with the consul dispatched from Caffa. In spite of occasional conflicts with the locals, the consulate functioned until 1456. In addition to the Genoese, the city was the home to Armenian, Muslim and Jewish merchants. The city was a major centre of Black Sea slave trade. Wax, wine and grain were exported to Europe via Sukhumi while cloth, luxury goods and salt were imported. Tskhumi served as capital of the Odishi — Megrelian rulers, it was in this city that Vamek I (c. 1384–1396), the most influential Dadiani, minted his coins.

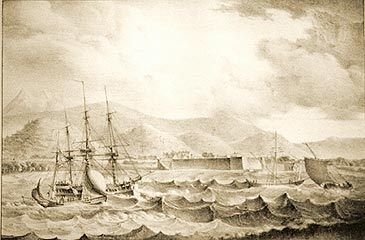
The Sohum-Kale fort in the early 19th century.

Documents of the 15th century clearly distinguished Tskhumi from Principality of Abkhazia. The Ottoman navy occupied the town in 1451, but for a short time. Later contested between the princes of Abkhazia and Mingrelia, Tskhumi finally fell to the Turks in the 1570s. The new masters heavily fortified the town and called it Sohumkale, with kale meaning "fort" but the first part of the name of disputed origin. It may represent Turkish su (Ottoman Turkish: صو), "water", and kum (Ottoman Turkish: قوم), "sand", but is more likely to be an alteration of its earlier Georgian name.

=== 19th–21st centuries ===
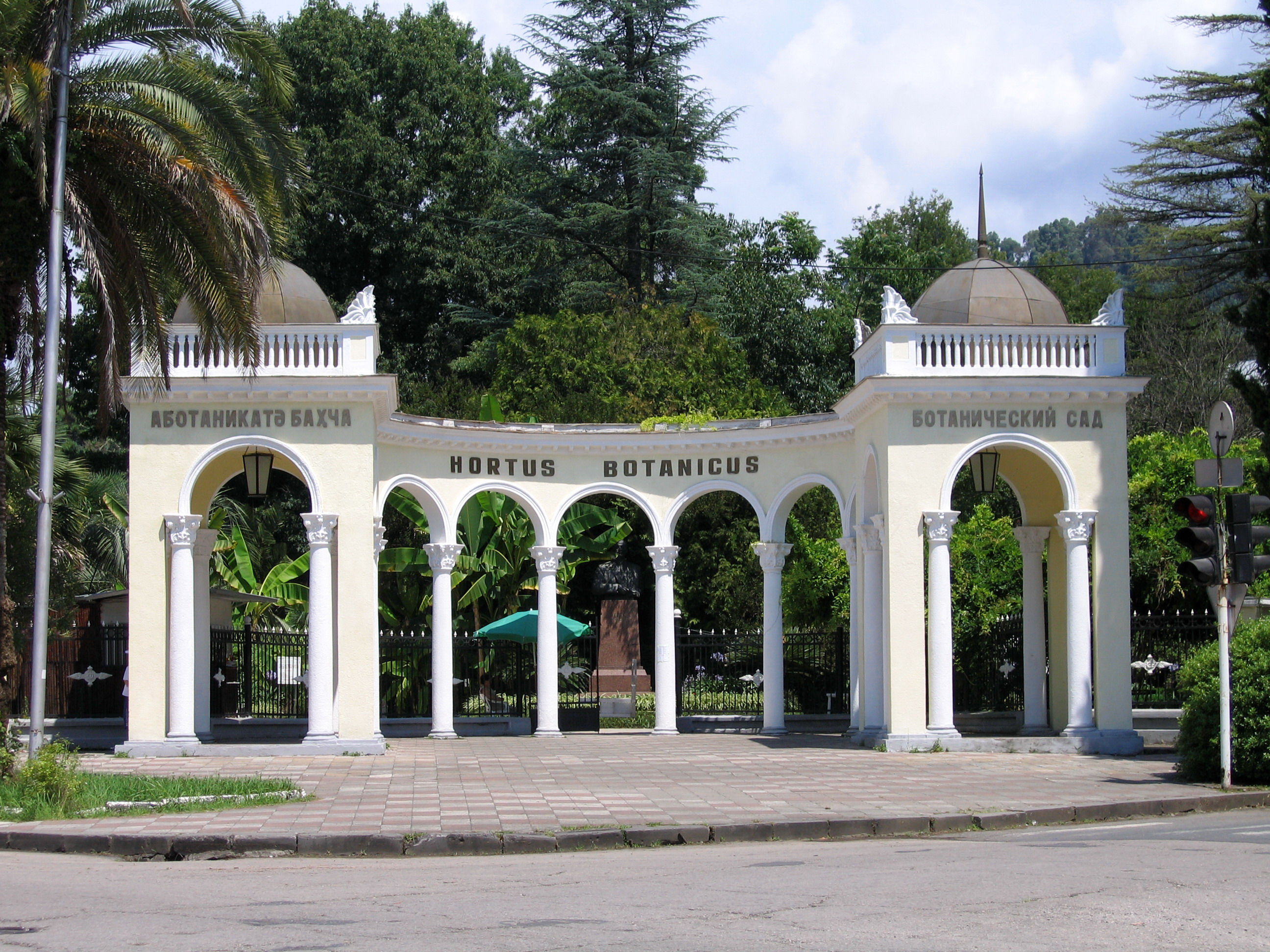
Sukhumi Botanical Garden

At the request of the pro-Russian Abkhazian prince, the town was stormed by the Russian Marines in 1810 and turned, subsequently, into a major outpost in the North West Caucasus. (See Russian conquest of the Caucasus). Sukhumi was declared the seaport in 1847 and was directly annexed to the Russian Empire after the ruling Shervashidze princely dynasty was ousted by the Russian authorities in 1864. During the Russo-Turkish War, 1877–1878, the town was temporarily controlled by the Ottoman forces and Abkhaz-Adyghe rebels. After its annexation, Sukhumi became the administrative center of the Sukhumi Okrug.

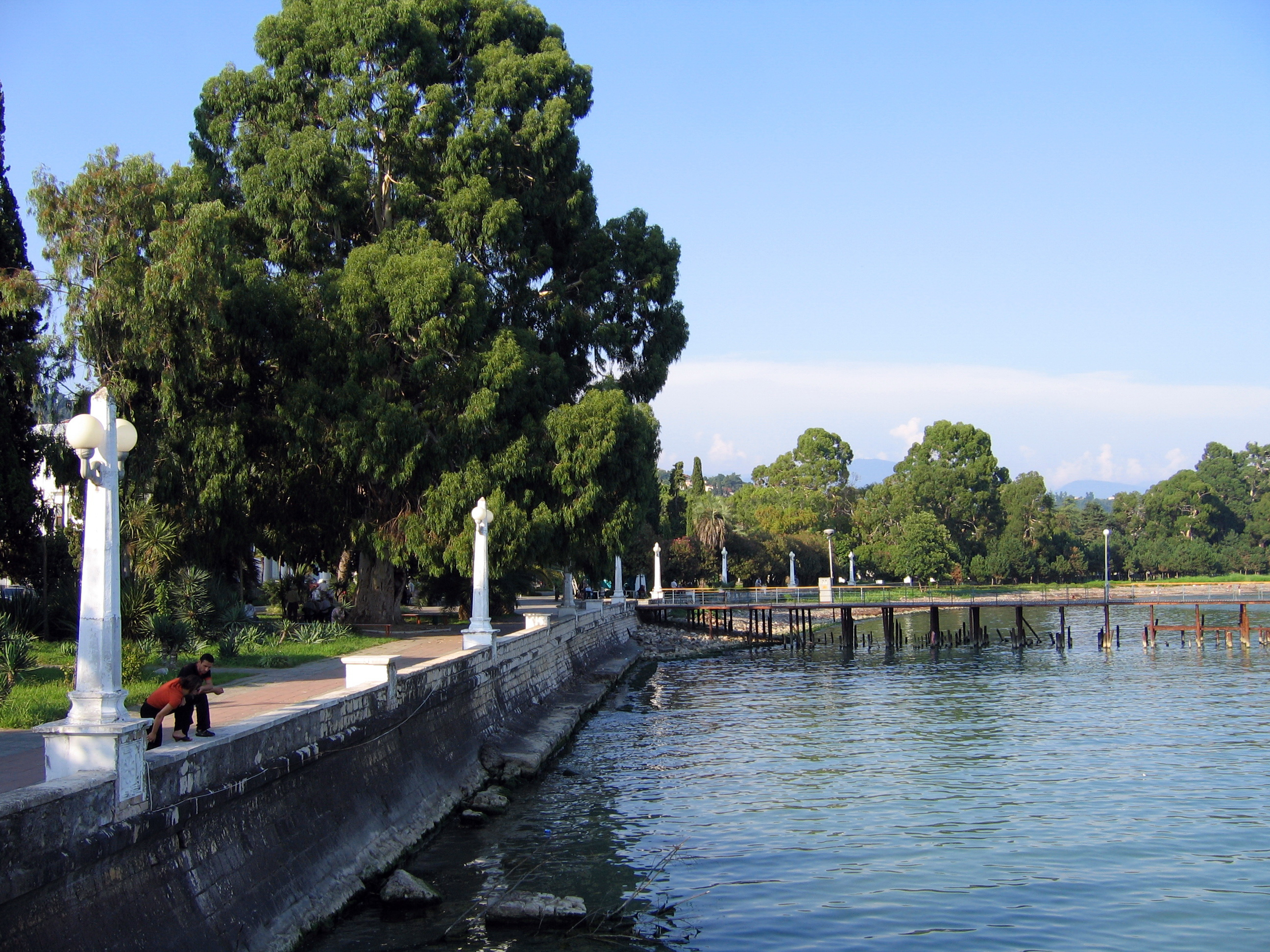
Sukhumi quay

Following the Russian Revolution of 1917, the town and Abkhazia in general were engulfed in the chaos of the Russian Civil War. A short-lived Bolshevik government was suppressed in May 1918 and Sukhumi was incorporated into the Democratic Republic of Georgia as a residence of the autonomous People's Council of Abkhazia and the headquarters of the Georgian governor-general. The Red Army and the local revolutionaries took the city from the Georgian forces on 4 March 1921, and declared Soviet rule. Sukhumi functioned as the capital of the "Union treaty" Abkhaz Soviet Socialist Republic associated with the Georgian SSR from 1921 until 1931, when it became the capital of the Abkhazian Autonomous Soviet Socialist Republic within the Georgian SSR. By 1989, Sukhumi had 120,000 inhabitants and was one of the most prosperous cities of Georgia.

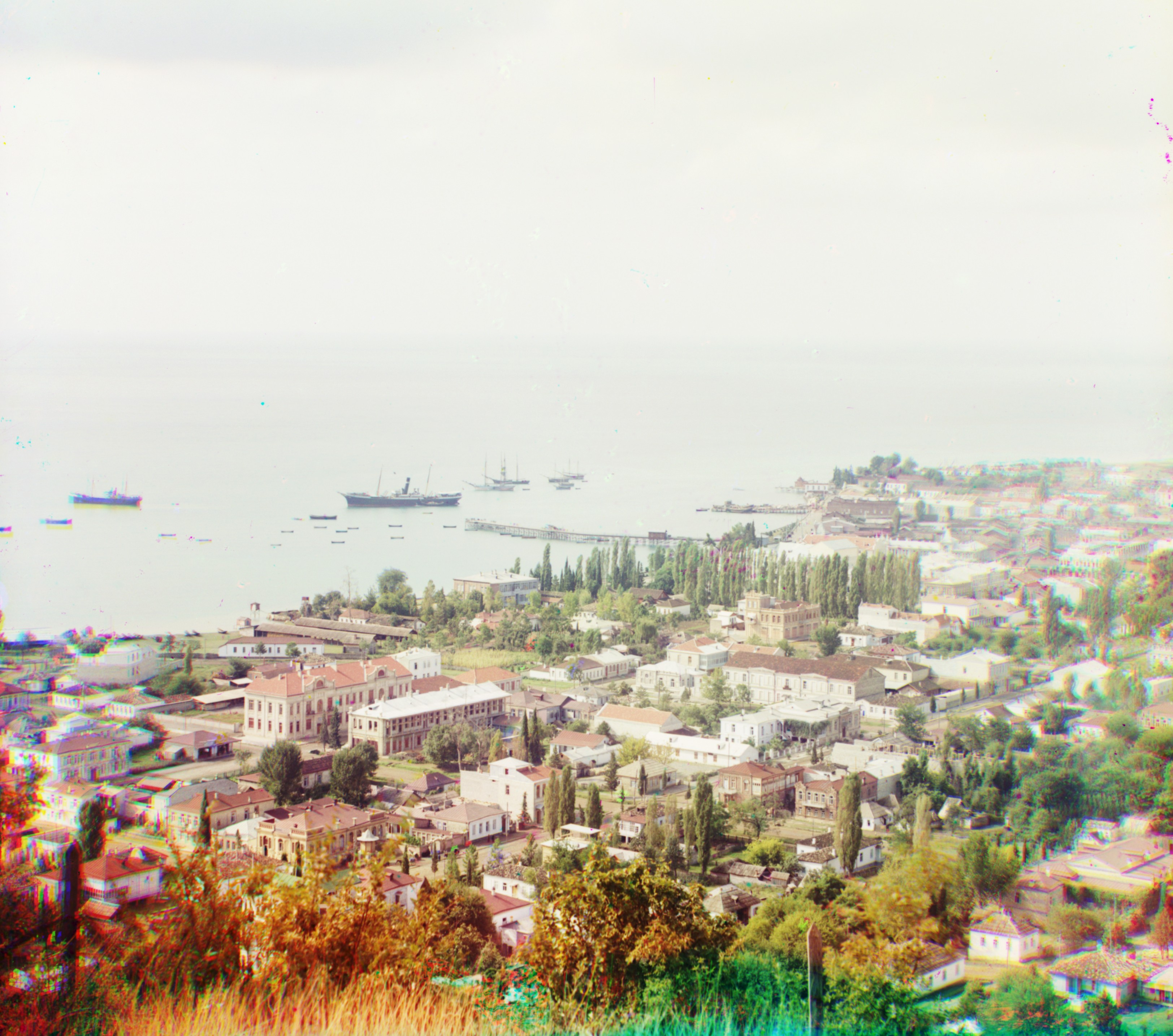
Sukhumi in 1912. Early color photo by Sergei Prokudin-Gorskii

Beginning with the 1989 riots, Sukhumi was a centre of the Georgian-Abkhaz conflict, and the city was severely damaged during the 1992–1993 War. During the war, the city and its environs suffered almost daily air strikes and artillery shelling, with heavy civilian casualties. On 27 September 1993 the battle for Sukhumi was concluded by a full-scale campaign of ethnic cleansing against its majority Georgian population (see Sukhumi Massacre), including members of the pro-Georgian Abkhazian government (Zhiuli Shartava, Raul Eshba and others) and mayor of Sukhumi Guram Gabiskiria. Although the city has been relatively peaceful and partially rebuilt, it is still suffering the after-effects of the war, and it has not regained its earlier ethnic diversity. Its population in 2017 was 65,716, compared to about 120,000 in 1989. During summer holidays season its population usually doubles and triples with a large inflow of international tourists.

In 2021, there was unrest in the city leading to the resignation of President Aslan Bzhania.

== Population ==
=== Demographics ===
Historic population figures for Sukhumi, split out by ethnicity, based on population censuses:

Year	Abkhaz	Armenians	Estonians	Georgians	Greeks	Russians	Turkish	Ukrainians	Total
1886 Census*	0.1% (3)	12.9% (53)	–	27.9% (115)	22.6% (93)	28.9% (119)	–	–	412
1897 Census*	1.8% (144)	13.5% (1,083)	0.4% (32)	30.9% (2,565)	14.3% (1,143)	21.1% (1,685)	2.7% (216)	–	7,998
1916 almanac**	n/a	13.3% (8,250)	n/a	40.6% (25,156)	n/a	30.5% (18,890)	n/a	n/a	61,974
1926 Census	3.1% (658)	9.4% (2,023)	0.3% (63)	23.3% (5,036)	10.7% (2,298)	23.7% (5,104)	–	10.4% (2,234)	21,568
1939 Census	5.5% (2,415)	9.8% (4,322)	0.5% (206)	19.9% (8,813)	11.3% (4,990)	41.9% (18,580)	–	4.6% (2,033)	44,299
1959 Census	5.6% (3,647)	10.5% (6,783)	–	31.1% (20,110)	4.9% (3,141)	36.8% (23,819)	–	4.3% (2,756)	64,730
1979 Census	9.9% (10,766)	10.9% (11,823)	–	38.3% (41,507)	6.5% (7,069)	26.4% (28,556)	–	3.4% (3,733)	108,337
1989 Census	12.5% (14,922)	10.3% (12,242)	–	41.5% (49,460)	–	21.6% (25,739)	–	–	119,150
2003 Census	56.3% (24,603)	12.7% (5,565)	0.1% (65)	4.0% (1,761)	1.5% (677)	16.9% (8,902)	–	1.6% (712)	43,716
2011 Census	67.3% (42,603)	9.8% (6,192)	–	2.8% (1,755)	1.0% (645)	14.8% (9,288)	–	–	62,914

* The Abkhazians were collectively deemed guilty of the 1877 insurrection, leading to restrictions that forbade them from settling near the coast (except for members of the upper classes) or living in Sukhumi. The devastated central part of Abkhazia, modern-day Sukhumi and Gulripshi districts, between the rivers Psyrtskha and Kodori became a colonized land-fund of the imperial administration. A buffer-zone was thus established between the Gudauta and Ochamchira Abkhazians. Abkhazians had no right to settle in this part of their own country. Meanwhile, thousands of Armenians, Mingrelians, Greeks, Russians, Estonians, Germans, and Moldovans were resettled there starting from 1879.

** The 1916 almanac gives separate figures only for Russians, Kartvelians and Armenians.

=== Religion ===
Most of the inhabitants belong to the Orthodox and Armenian Apostolic Churches, Islam and the Abkhaz traditional religion.

== Culture ==
=== Main sights ===
Sukhumi theatres which offer classical and modern performances, with the theatre season lasting from September to June. Several galleries and museums exhibit modern and historical Abkhaz visual art. Sukhumi Botanical Garden was established in 1840 to introduce new plants to the Caucasus.

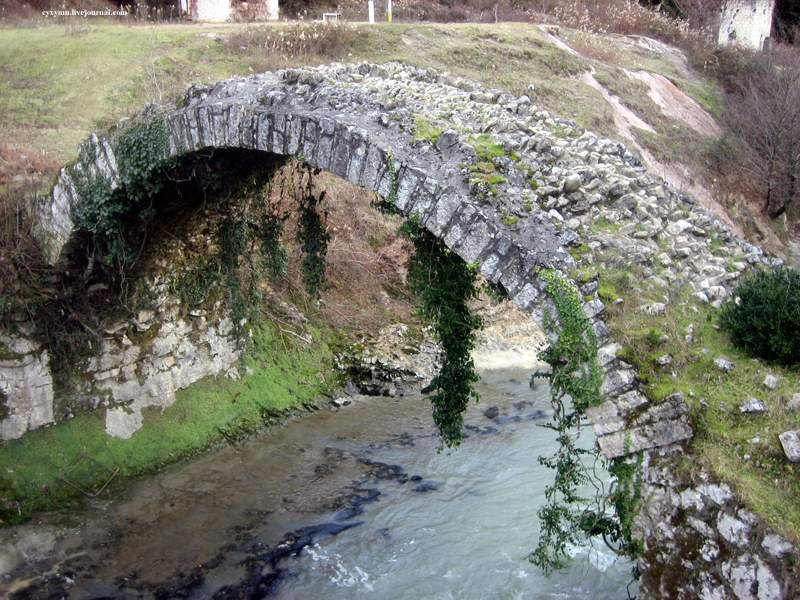
Medieval bridge over the Besletka river known as the Queen Tamar Bridge.

Sukhumi houses a number of historical monuments, notably the Besleti Bridge built during the reign of queen Tamar of Georgia in the 12th century. It also retains visible vestiges of the defunct monuments, including the Roman walls, the medieval Castle of Bagrat, several towers of the Kelasuri Wall, also known as Great Abkhazian Wall, constructed between 1628 and 1653 by Levan II Dadiani to protect his fiefdom from the Abkhaz tribes; the 14th-century Genoese fort and the 18th-century Ottoman fortress. The 11th century Kamani Monastery (12 kilometres (7 miles) from Sukhumi) is erected, according to tradition, over the tomb of Saint John Chrysostom.

Northward in the mountains is the Krubera Cave, one of the deepest in the world, with a depth of 2,140 meters.

=== Education ===
Higher education in Sukhumi currently is represented by one university, Abkhazian State University, which has a special status in the education system in Abkhazia and it manages its own budget.

Abkhaz State University (1979), has its own campus which is a home for 42 departments organized into 8 faculties providing education to about 3300 students (as of 2019, est.).

== Climate ==
Sukhumi has a humid subtropical climate (Köppen Cfa), that is almost cool enough in summer to be an oceanic climate (Cfb).

Climate data for Sukhumi
Month	Jan	Feb	Mar	Apr	May	Jun	Jul	Aug	Sep	Oct	Nov	Dec	Year
Mean daily maximum °C (°F)	10.0 (50.0)	10.7 (51.3)	12.8 (55.0)	16.8 (62.2)	20.4 (68.7)	24.2 (75.6)	26.5 (79.7)	26.8 (80.2)	24.1 (75.4)	20.3 (68.5)	15.6 (60.1)	12.0 (53.6)	18.3 (65.0)
Mean daily minimum °C (°F)	2.2 (36.0)	2.7 (36.9)	4.5 (40.1)	8.3 (46.9)	12.2 (54.0)	16.2 (61.2)	19.0 (66.2)	18.6 (65.5)	14.8 (58.6)	10.4 (50.7)	6.6 (43.9)	3.9 (39.0)	10.0 (49.9)
Average precipitation mm (inches)	102 (4.0)	76 (3.0)	102 (4.0)	102 (4.0)	92 (3.6)	89 (3.5)	83 (3.3)	107 (4.2)	120 (4.7)	114 (4.5)	104 (4.1)	108 (4.3)	1,199 (47.2)
Average rainy days	17	15	16	15	12	11	10	10	10	12	16	16	160
Source 1: climatebase.ru
Source 2: Georgia Travel Climate Information

== Administration ==
On 2 February 2000, President Ardzinba dismissed temporary Mayor Leonid Osia and appointed Leonid Lolua in his stead. Lolua was reappointed on 10 May 2001 following the March 2001 local elections.

On 5 November 2004, in the heated aftermath of the 2004 presidential election, president Vladislav Ardzinba appointed head of the Gulripshi District assembly Adgur Kharazia as acting mayor. During his first speech he called upon the two leading candidates, Sergei Bagapsh and Raul Khadjimba, to both withdraw.

On 16 February 2005, after his election as president, Bagapsh replaced Kharazia with Astamur Adleiba, who had been Minister for Youth, Sports, Resorts and Tourism until December 2004. In the 11 February 2007 local elections, Adleiba successfully defended his seat in the Sukhumi city assembly and was thereupon reappointed mayor by Bagapsh on 20 March.

In April 2007, while President Bagapsh was in Moscow for medical treatment, the results of an investigation into corruption within the Sukhumi city administration were made public. The investigation found that large sums had been embezzled and upon his return, on 2 May, Bagapsh fired Adleiba along with his deputy Boris Achba, the head of the Sukhumi's finance department Konstantin Tuzhba and the head of the housing department David Jinjolia. On 4 June Adleiba paid back to the municipal budget 200,000 rubels. and on 23 July, he resigned from the Sukhumi city council, citing health reasons and the need to travel abroad for medical treatment.

On 15 May 2007, president Bagapsh released Alias Labakhua as First Deputy Chairman of the State Customs Committee and appointed him acting Mayor of Sukhumi, a post temporarily fulfilled by former Vice-Mayor Anzor Kortua. On 27 May Labakhua appointed Vadim Cherkezia as Deputy Chief of staff. On 2 September, Labakhua won the by-election in constituency No. 21, which had become necessary after Adleiba relinquished his seat. Adleiba was the only candidate and voter turnout was 34%, higher than the 25% required. Since Adleiba was now a member of the city assembly, president Bagapsh could permanently appoint him Mayor of Sukhumi on 18 September.

Following the May 2014 Revolution and the election of Raul Khajimba as president, he on 22 October dismissed Labakhua and again appointed (as acting Mayor) Adgur Kharazia, who at that point was Vice Speaker of the People's Assembly. Kharazia won 4 April 2015 by-election to the City Council in constituency no. 3 unopposed, and was confirmed as mayor by Khajimba on 4 May. The 6th convocation of the Sukhumi City Council was elected 13 April 2016.

=== List of mayors ===
#	Name	From	Until	President	Comments
Chairmen of the (executive committee of the) City Soviet:
	Vladimir Mikanba	1975	1985		
	D. Gubaz	<=1989	>=1989		
	Nodar Khashba	1991			First time
	Guram Gabiskiria	1992	27 September 1993		
Heads of the City Administration:
	Nodar Khashba	1993	26 November 1994		Second time
	Nodar Khashba	26 November 1994	1995	Vladislav Ardzinba	Second time
	Garri Aiba	1995	2000	Vladislav Ardzinba	
	Leonid Osia		2 February 2000	Vladislav Ardzinba	Acting Mayor
	Leonid Lolua	2 February 2000	5 November 2004	Vladislav Ardzinba	
	Adgur Kharazia	5 November 2004	16 February 2005	Vladislav Ardzinba	Acting Mayor, first time
	Astamur Adleiba	16 February 2005	2 May 2007	Sergei Bagapsh	
	Anzor Kortua	May 2007	15 May 2007	Sergei Bagapsh	Acting Mayor
	Alias Labakhua	15 May 2007	29 May 2011	Sergei Bagapsh	
	Alias Labakhua	29 May 2011	1 June 2014	Alexander Ankvab	
	Alias Labakhua	1 June 2014	22 October 2014	Valeri Bganba	
	Adgur Kharazia	22 October 2014	21 October 2019	Raul Khajimba	Second time
	Kan Kvarchia (Acting)	21 October 2019	13 Jan 2020	Raul Khajimba	
	Kan Kvarchia (Acting)	13 Jan 2020	23 April 2020	Valeri Bganba	
	Kan Kvarchia (Acting)	23 April 2020	30 April 2020	Aslan Bzhania	
	Beslan Eshba	30 April 2020	19 November 2024	Aslan Bzhania	
	Beslan Eshba	19 November 2024	8 April 2025	Badra Gunba	
	Timur Agrba	8 April 2025	Present	Badra Gunba	

== Transport ==
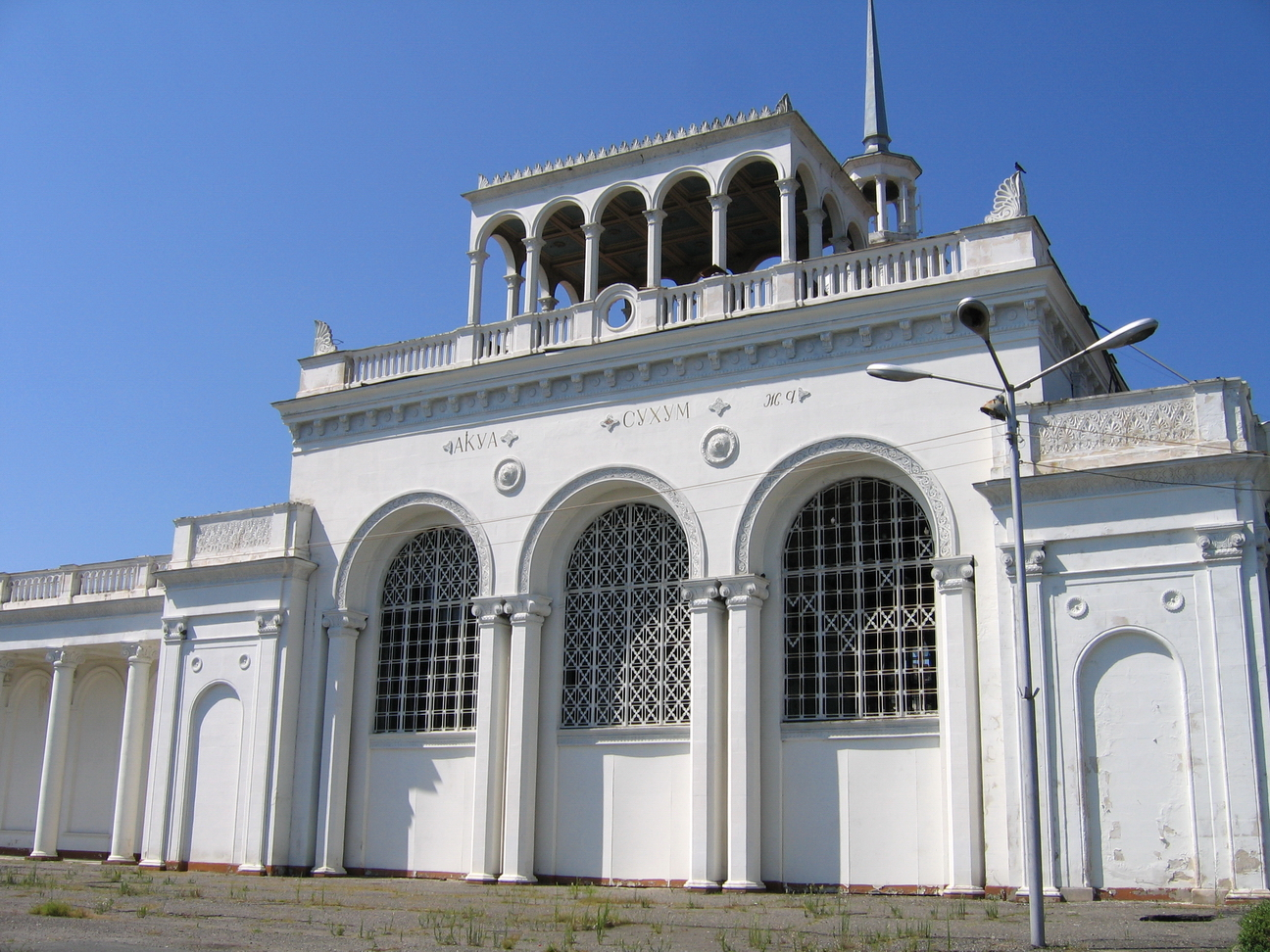
Railway station

Sukhumi is served by a network of 3 trolleybus lines. 13 modern trolleybuses to replace older soviet models have been donated to Sukhum by St Petersburg.

There is a railway station in Sukhumi, that has a daily train to Moscow via Sochi.

Sukhumi Babushara Airport received its first scheduled international flight on 1 May 2025. Currently flights are offered to 13 Russian cities all by Russian airlines and in 2025 passenger traffic amounted to 120,000.

== Notable people ==
Notable people who are from or have resided in Sukhumi:

- Verdicenan Achba (1825–1889), seventh wife of Sultan Abdulmejid I of the Ottoman Empire.
- Beslan Ajinjal (1974), former Russian footballer.
- Anton Alikhanov (1986), Russian politician, governor of Kaliningrad Oblast
- Alexander Ankvab (1952), Abkhaz politician and businessman, Former Prime Minister of Abkhazia.
- Otari Arshba (1955), Russian politician and member of the State Duma of the Russian Federation.
- Hadzhera Avidzba (1917–1997), Abkhazia's first professional pianist.
- Meri Avidzba (1917–1986), Abkhaz female pilot who fought during the Great Patriotic War of 1942–1945.
- Sergei Bagapsh (1949–2011), Second President of the Republic of Abkhazia
- Kokkai Futoshi (1981), Georgian former professional sumo wrestler.
- Guram Gabiskiria (1947–1993), Mayor of Sukhumi and National Hero of Georgia.
- Guranda Gabunia (1938–2019), Georgian actress
- Siranush Gasparyan (1978), Armenian opera singer born in Sukhumi.
- Badra Gunba (1981), Sixth President of the Republic of Abkhazia
- Georgi Gulia (1913-1989), Abkhazian writer and artist
- Demna Gvasalia (1981), Georgian fashion designer.
- Fazil Iskander (1929–2016), Russian writer and poet.
- Irma Khetsuriani (1985), Georgian wheelchair fencing world champion.
- Sergey Kiriyenko (1962), Russian politician, First Deputy Chief of Staff of the Presidential Administration of Russia.
- Vera Kobalia (1981), Georgian politician.
- Anatoliy Kotenyov (1958), Belarussian actor.
- Daur Kove (1979), former Minister for Foreign Affairs of Abkhazia.
- Zurab Sotkilava (1937-2017), former Georgian footballer and opera singer.

== International relations ==
=== Twin towns — Sister cities ===
Sukhumi is twinned with the following cities:

- Arkhangelsk, Russia
- Cheboksary, Russia
- Donetsk
- Krasnodor, Russia
- Managua, Nicaragua
- Podolsk, Russia
- Sant'Antioco, Italy
- Side, Turkey
- Suhum, Ghana
- Tambov, Russia
- Tshkinval, South Ossetia
- Ufa, Russia

== See also ==
- Sokhumi Municipality
- Sukhumi District
- List of twin towns and sister cities in Georgia
