= Sukhumi District =

Sukhumi District სოხუმის რაიონი Аҟәа араион Сухумский район
- District
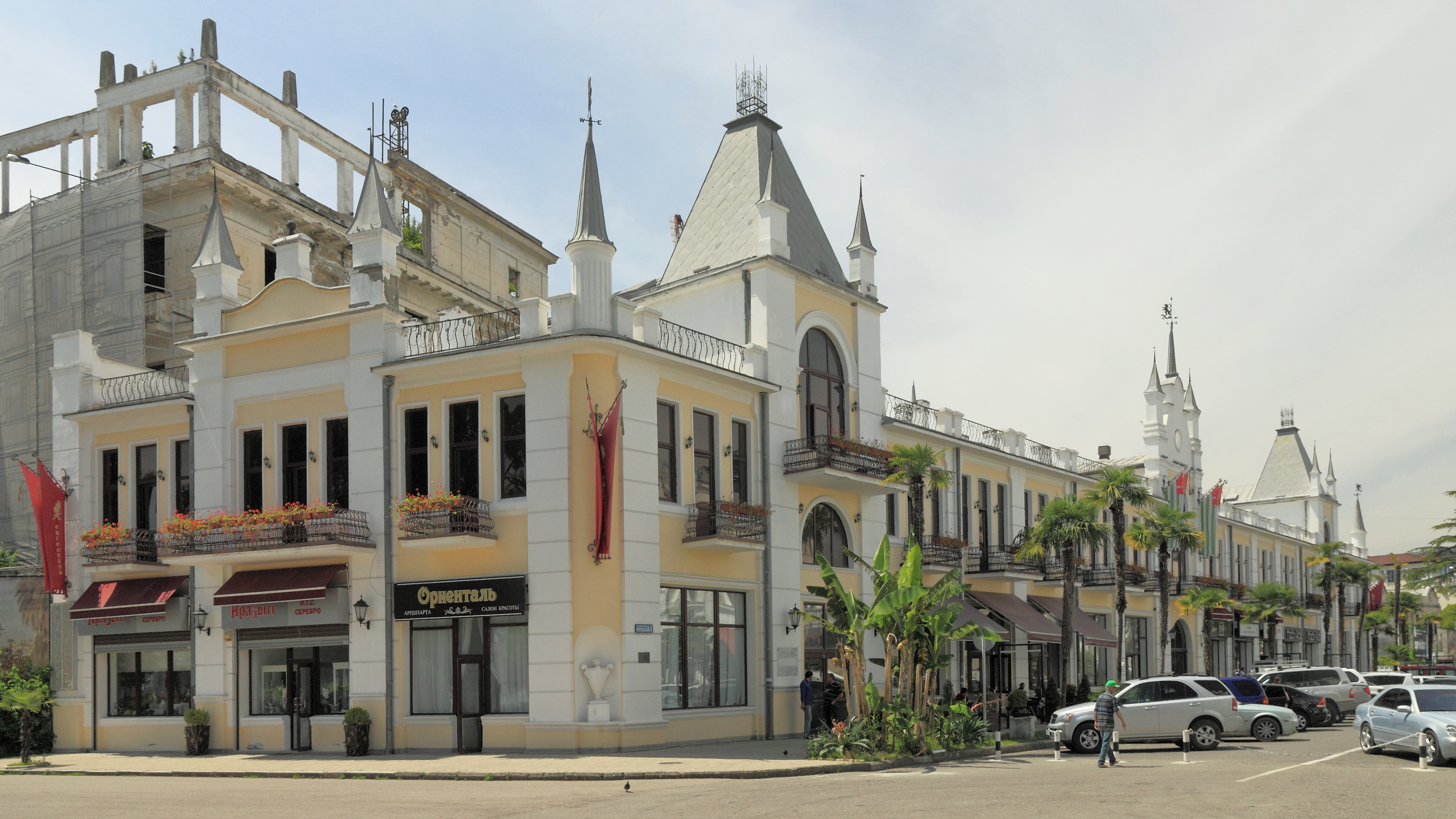
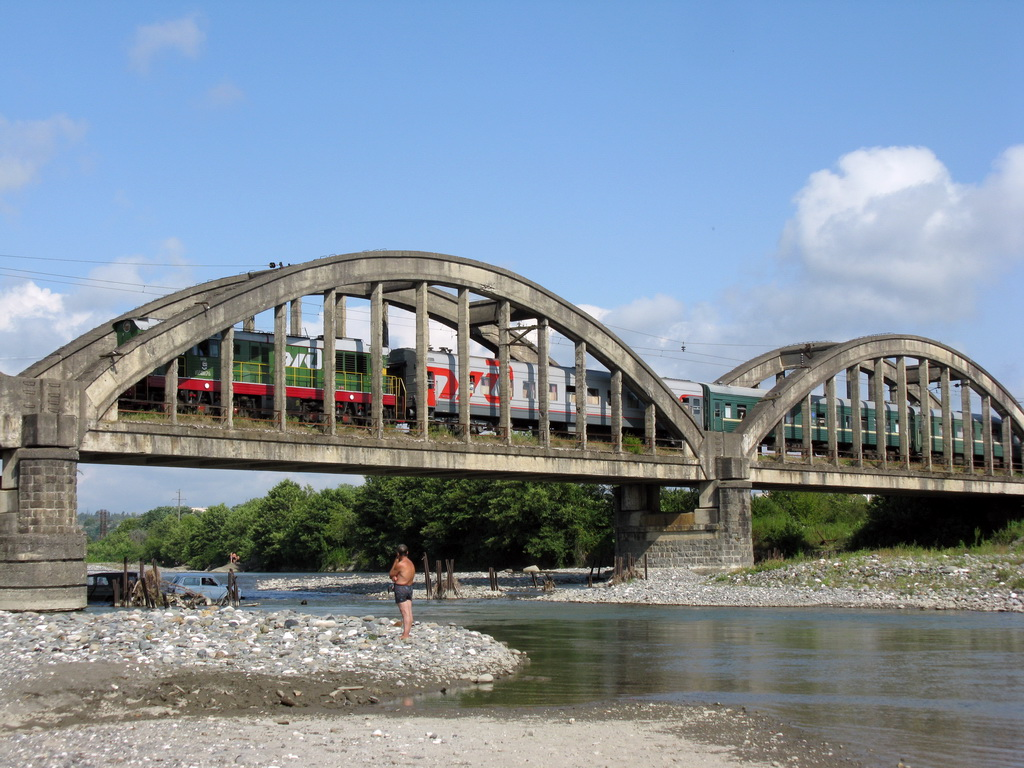
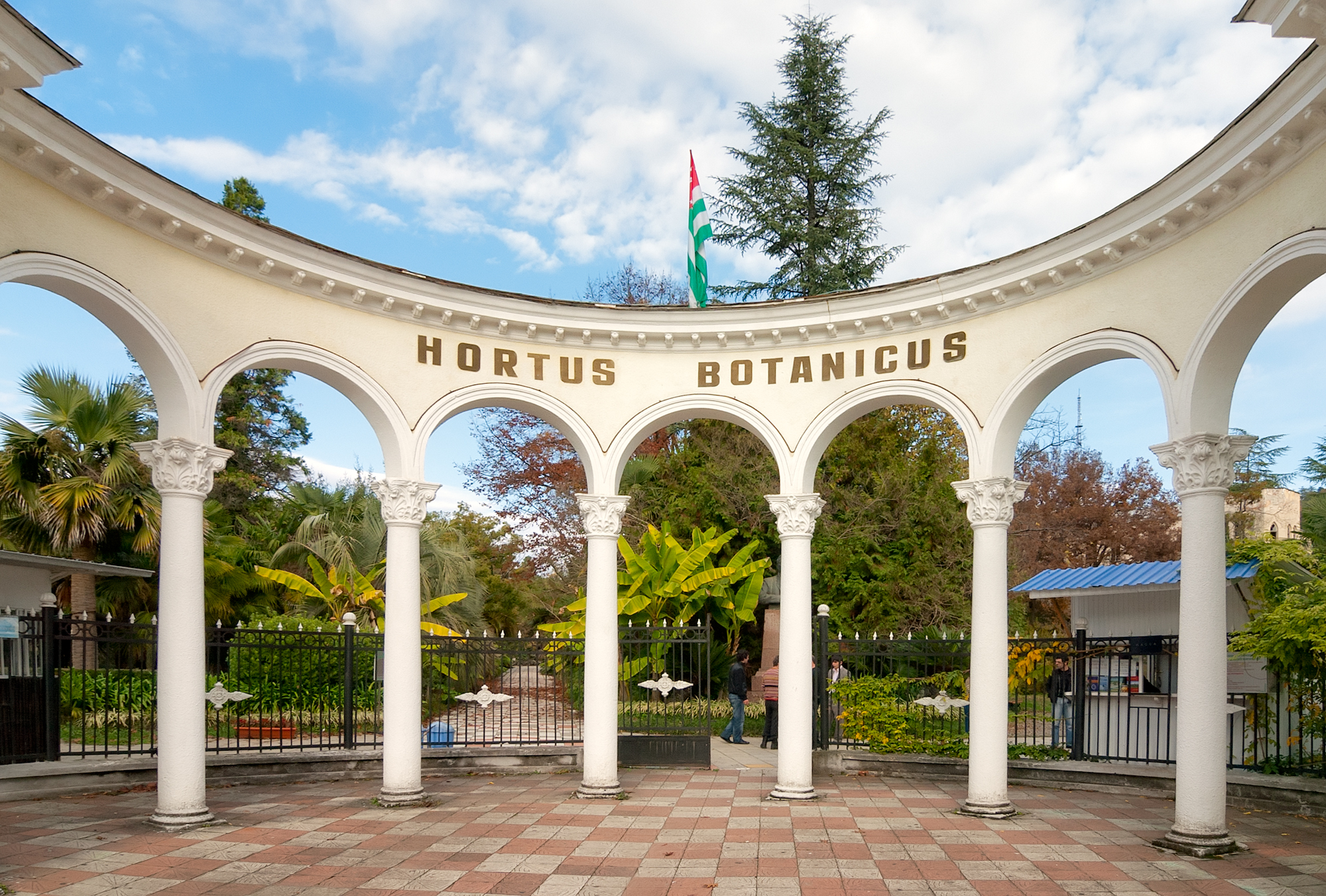
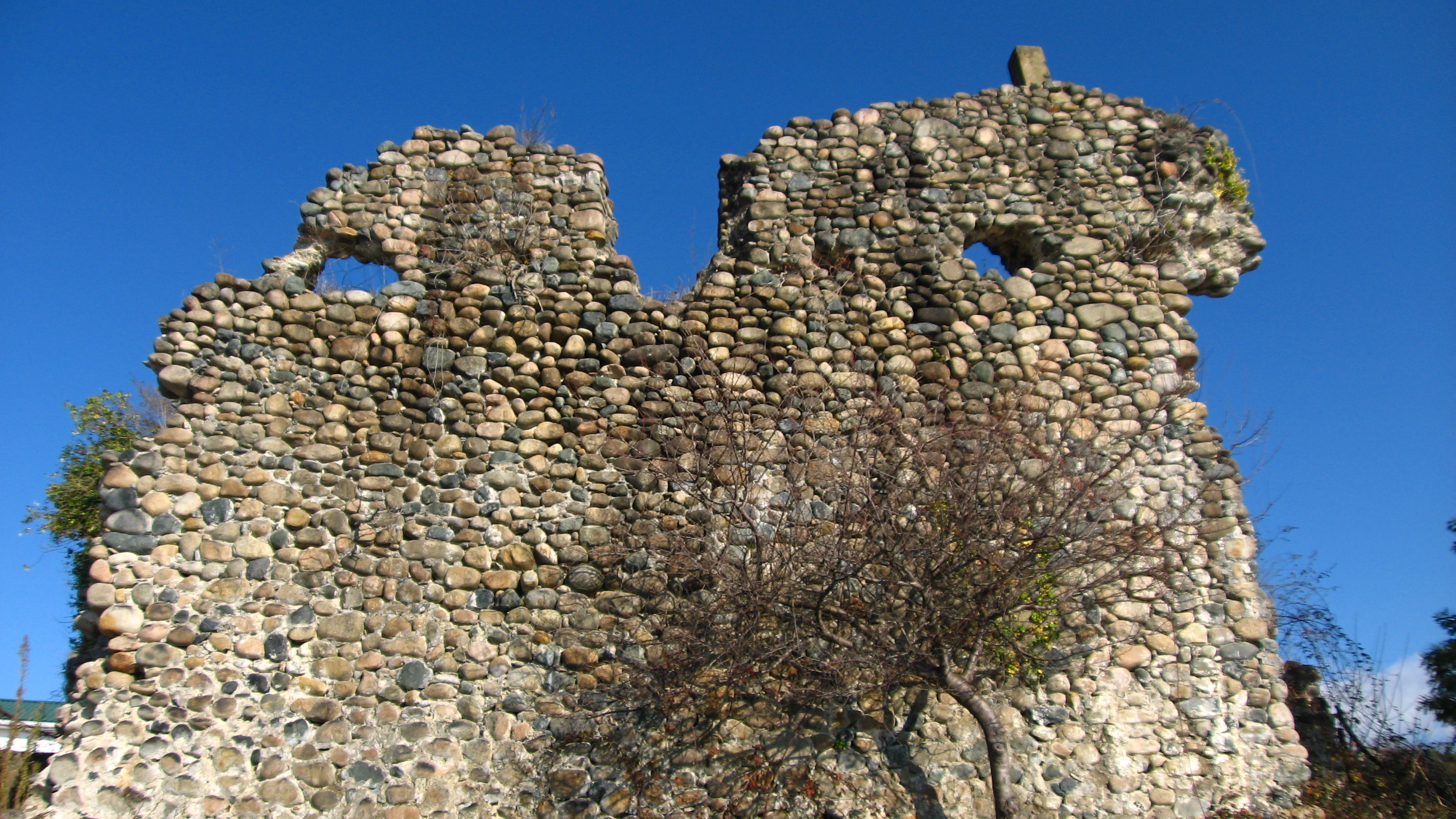
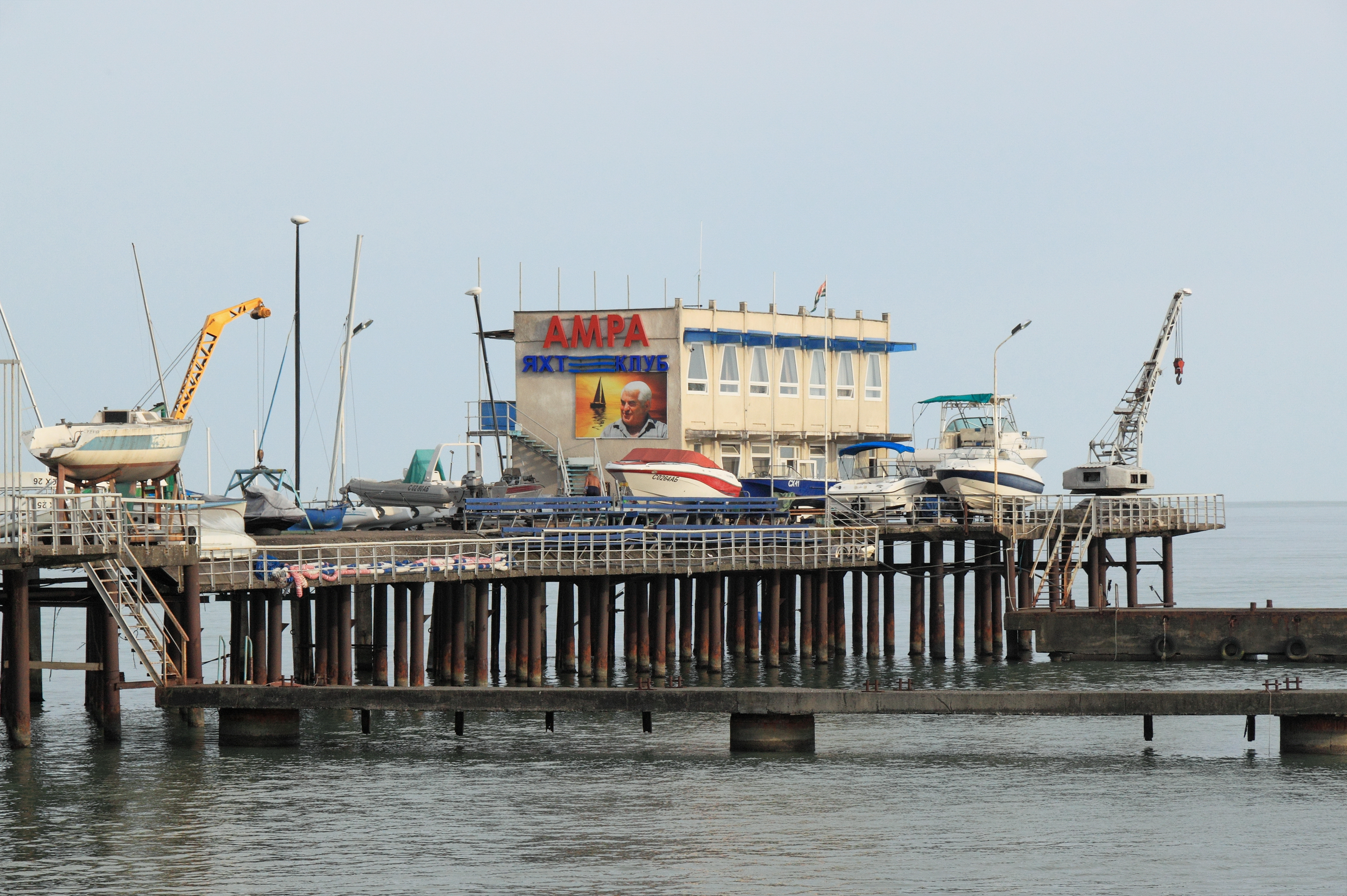
- From the top to bottom-right, Sukhumi, Gumista River, Botanical Garden, Kelasuri Wall, Black Sea
- Location of Sukhumi in Abkhazia
- Coordinates: 43.2000°N 41.0000°E
- Country: Georgia
- De facto state: Abkhazia
- Capital: Sukhumi

Government
  - Governor: Beslan Avidzba

Area
  - Total: 1,523 km^{2} (588 sq mi)

Population (2011)
  - Total: 11,531
  - Density: 7.571/km^{2} (19.61/sq mi)
- Time zone: UTC+3 (MSK)

Sukhumi District is one of the districts of Abkhazia, one of Georgia’s two breakaway republics. It corresponds to the eponymous Georgian municipality. Its capital is Sukhumi, the town by the same name, which is also the capital of entire Abkhazia. The population of the district is 11,531 according to the 2011 census. The city of Sukhumi is a separate administrative entity with 62,914 inhabitants.

== Demographics ==
According to the 2011 Census, Sukhumi District had a population of 11,531:

- Armenians (56.1%)
- Abkhaz (30.4%)
- Russians (7.5%)
- Georgians (2%)
- Greeks (1.3%)
- Ukrainians (0.5%)

== Settlements ==
The city of Sukhumi is a separate administrative entity independent of the district. The district's main settlements are:

- Eshera
- Guma
- Kamani
- Pskhu

== Administration ==
Lev Avidzba was reappointed as Administration Head on 10 May 2001 following the March 2001 local elections.

On 2 April 2003, President Ardzinba dismissed Lev Avidzba and appointed State Security Service Chairman Zurab Agumava as acting District Head. Agumava remained in this post until in 2006 he was appointed Military Prosecutor by Ardzinba's successor Sergei Bagapsh.

On 21 February 2007, before the local elections, President Bagapsh temporarily prolonged Vladimir Avidzba tenure as Head of the District Administration. After Avidzba was re-elected, he was permanently re-appointed on 21 March.

On 12 June 2012, President Alexander Ankvab dismissed Avidzba for reaching the age of retirement, and awarded him with the order Akhdz-Apsha in the third degree for his long government service. On the same day, Ankvab appointed Head of the Education Department Zhuzhuna Bigvava as Avidzba's successor.

Following the May 2014 Revolution and the election of Raul Khajimba as President, on 28 October 2014 he dismissed Bigvava and appointed Beslan Avidzba as acting Head of the Administration. Avidzba was permanently appointed after local elections were held, on 2 June 2016.

=== List of Administration Heads ===
#	Name	Entered office	Left office	President	Comments
Heads of the District Administration:
	Lev Avidzba	October 1993	2 April 2003	Vladislav Ardzinba	
	Zurab Agumava	2 April 2003	12 February 2005	Vladislav Ardzinba	
	Zurab Agumava	12 February 2005	2006	Sergei Bagapsh	
	Vladimir Avidzba	2006	29 May 2011	Sergei Bagapsh	
	Vladimir Avidzba	29 May 2011	12 June 2012	Alexander Ankvab	
	Zhuzhuna Bigvava	12 June 2012	Present	Alexander Ankvab	
	Zhuzhuna Bigvava	1 June 2014	28 October 2014	Valeri Bganba	
	Beslan Avidzba	28 October 2014	Present	Raul Khajimba	

== See also ==
- Administrative divisions of Abkhazia
- Meri Avidzba, a famous female pilot during the Great Patriotic War
