= United Nations Security Council Resolution 971 =

UN Security Council Resolution 971
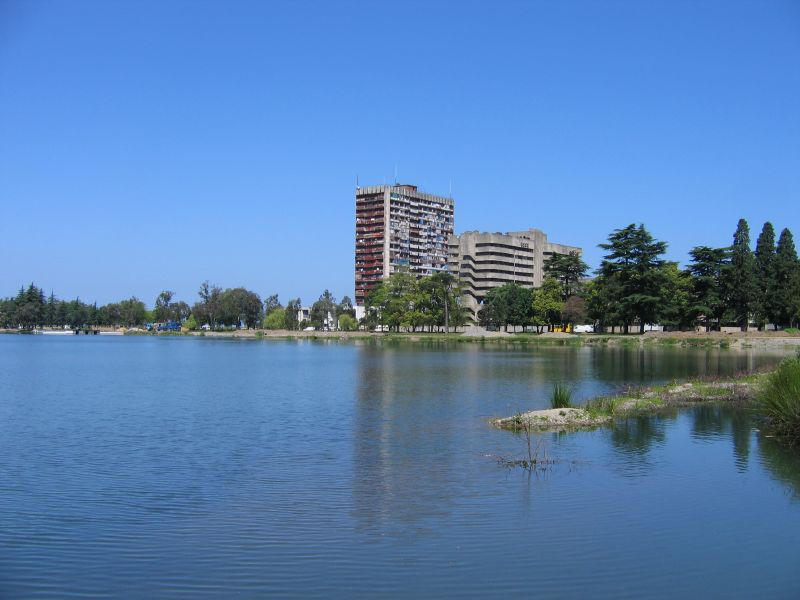
- This apartment block accommodated refugees from Abkhazia
- Date: 12 January 1995
- Meeting no.: 3,488
- Code: S/RES/971 (Document)
- Subject: Abkhazia, Georgia
- Voting summary: 15 voted for; None voted against; None abstained
- Result: Adopted

Security Council composition
- Permanent members: China; France; Russia; United Kingdom; United States
- Non-permanent members: Argentina; Botswana; Czech Republic; Germany; Honduras; Indonesia; Italy; Nigeria; Oman; Rwanda

United Nations Security Council resolution 971, adopted unanimously on 12 January 1995, after reaffirming resolutions 849 (1993), 854 (1993), 858 (1993), 876 (1993), 881 (1993), 892 (1993), 896 (1994), 901 (1994), 906 (1994), 934 (1994) and 937 (1994), the Council extended the United Nations Observer Mission in Georgia (UNOMIG) until 15 May 1995.

The Security Council reaffirmed the sovereignty and territorial integrity of Georgia and the right to return of all refugees, on which an agreement was signed. The parties were urged not to undertake any unilateral actions that would impede the political process. There was a lack of progress on a comprehensive peace settlement and a slow return of refugees. In this regard the parties were called upon to work towards a settlement, particularly on the issue of the political status of Abkhazia. The Council expressed satisfaction at the co-operation between UNOMIG and the Commonwealth of Independent States (CIS) peacekeeping force.

After extending the mandate of UNOMIG until 15 May 1995, the Secretary-General Boutros Boutros-Ghali was requested to report on the situation in Abkhazia and Georgia within two months from the adoption of the current resolution. Both parties, particularly the Abkhaz side, were urged to comply with their commitments concerning refugees and displaced persons. The Secretary-General was asked to co-operate with the CIS force in taking additional steps to ensure the return of refugees and displaced persons, while Member States were called upon to contribute to the voluntary fund established by the Agreement on a Cease-fire and Separation of Forces.

== See also ==
- Georgian–Abkhazian conflict
- List of United Nations Security Council Resolutions 901 to 1000 (1994–1995)
- United Nations resolutions on Abkhazia
- War in Abkhazia (1992–1993)
