= United Nations Security Council Resolution 937 =

UN Security Council Resolution 937
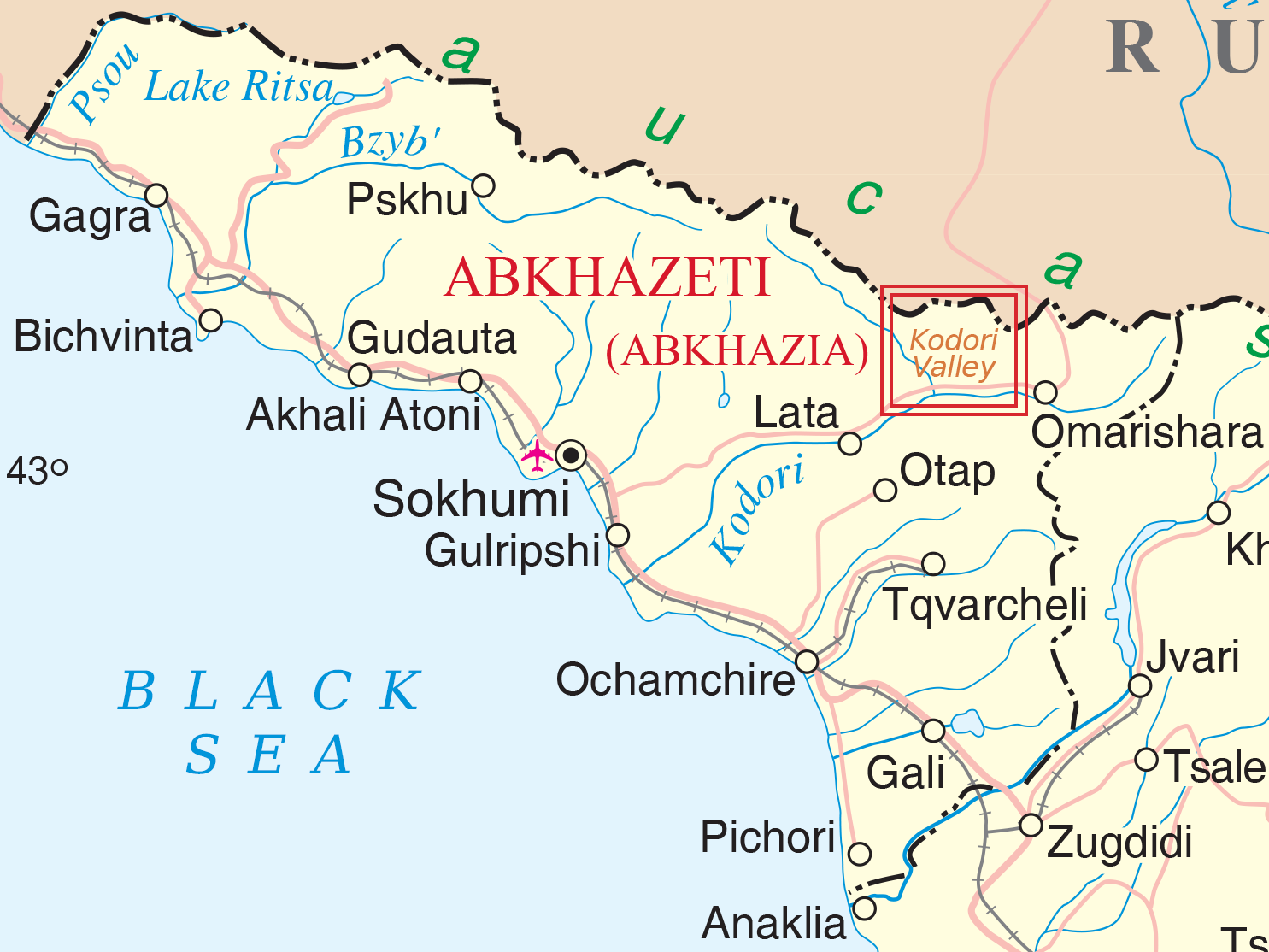
- Kodori Valley (highlighted) in Abkhazia
- Date: 21 July 1994
- Meeting no.: 3,407
- Code: S/RES/937 (Document)
- Subject: Abkhazia, Georgia
- Voting summary: 14 voted for; None voted against; None abstained
- Result: Adopted

Security Council composition
- Permanent members: China; France; Russia; United Kingdom; United States
- Non-permanent members: Argentina; Brazil; Czech Republic; Djibouti; New Zealand; Nigeria; Oman; Pakistan; Rwanda; Spain

United Nations Security Council resolution 937, adopted on 21 July 1994, after reaffirming resolutions 849 (1993), 854 (1993), 858 (1993), 876 (1993), 881 (1993), 892 (1993), 896 (1994), 901 (1994), 906 (1994) and 934 (1994), the Council expanded the United Nations Observer Mission in Georgia (UNOMIG) to include co-operation with the Commonwealth of Independent States (CIS) and extended its mandate until 13 January 1995.

The Council reaffirmed the territorial integrity and sovereignty of Georgia and the right of all refugees and displaced persons to return home. It also welcomed the Agreement on a Cease-fire and Separation of Forces signed between the Abkhaz and Georgian sides in Moscow, Russia and recognised other agreements. It was important that negotiations continued to reach a political settlement both mutually acceptable to both parties. The deployment of a CIS peacekeeping force depended on the consent of the parties. The parties were also urged to ensure complete freedom of movement for the CIS peacekeeping force and UNOMIG.

The parties were urged to accelerate negotiations to find a political settlement under the auspices of the United Nations with participation from Russia and representatives of the Organization for Security and Co-operation in Europe. The Secretary-General Boutros Boutros-Ghali was authorised to strengthen UNOMIG by 136 military observers, and expanded its mandate to include:

(a) monitoring implementation of the Agreement on a Cease-fire and Separation of Forces;
(b) observing the CIS peacekeeping force;
(c) ensuring that troops and heavy weapons remain outside the security zone;
(d) monitoring storage of heavy weapons;
(e) monitoring of the withdrawal of Georgian troops from the Kodori Valley;
(f) patrolling the Kodori Valley;
(g) investigating violations of agreements;
(h) reporting on the implementation of the Agreement, violations and other developments;
(i) maintaining contact with both parties, co-operate with the CIS and with its presence, ensuring the safe return of displaced persons.

The secretary-general was further asked to set up a fund to support the implementation of the agreements and humanitarian efforts, including demining. Within three months, he was required to report to the council on developments in the situation.

Resolution 937 was adopted by 14 votes to none; Rwanda was absent.

== See also ==
- Abkhaz–Georgian conflict
- List of United Nations Security Council Resolutions 901 to 1000 (1994–1995)
- United Nations resolutions on Abkhazia
- War in Abkhazia (1992–1993)
