= United Nations Security Council Resolution 934 =

UN Security Council Resolution 934
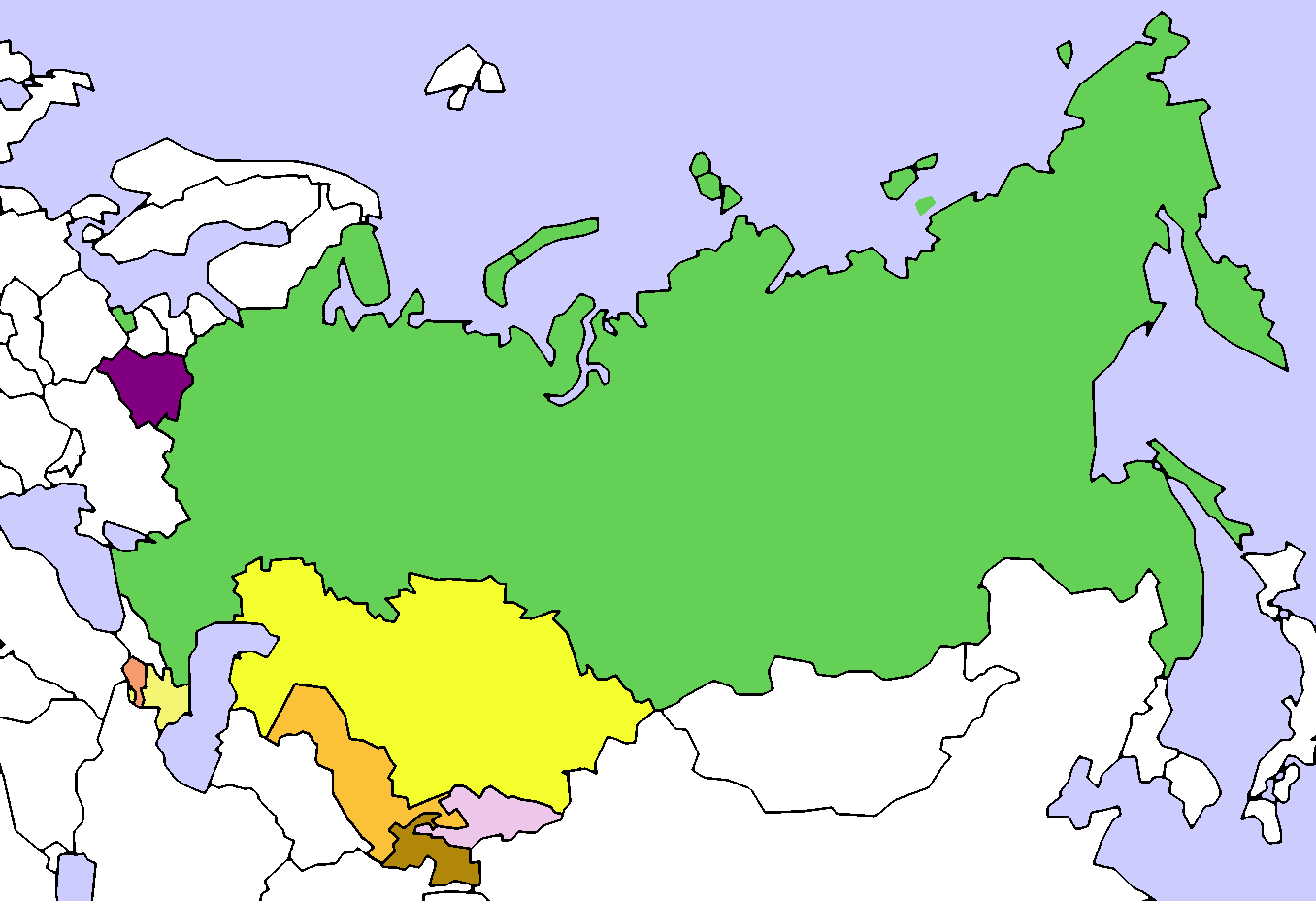
- The CIS
- Date: 30 June 1994
- Meeting no.: 3,398
- Code: S/RES/934 (Document)
- Subject: Abkhazia, Georgia
- Voting summary: 15 voted for; None voted against; None abstained
- Result: Adopted

Security Council composition
- Permanent members: China; France; Russia; United Kingdom; United States
- Non-permanent members: Argentina; Brazil; Czech Republic; Djibouti; New Zealand; Nigeria; Oman; Pakistan; Rwanda; Spain

United Nations Security Council resolution 934, adopted unanimously on 30 June 1994, after reaffirming resolutions 849 (1993), 854 (1993), 858 (1993), 876 (1993), 881 (1993), 892 (1993), 896 (1994), 901 (1994) and 906 (1994), the Council noted the talks between Abkhazia and Georgia, and extended the mandate of the United Nations Observer Mission in Georgia (UNOMIG) until 21 July 1994.

The Council noted with satisfaction the assistance provided by the Commonwealth of Independent States (CIS) in the zone of conflict in co-ordination with UNOMIG. The Secretary-General was requested to report on discussions between UNOMIG, the parties and the CIS peacekeeping force concerning arrangements for co-ordination between an expanded UNOMIG and the CIS peacekeeping force. Recommendations regarding the expansion of UNOMIG would also be considered.

The resolution recognised the Agreement on a Cease-fire and Separation of Forces made in Moscow on 14 May 1994.

== See also ==
- Georgian–Abkhazian conflict
- List of United Nations Security Council Resolutions 901 to 1000 (1994–1995)
- United Nations resolutions on Abkhazia
- War in Abkhazia (1992–1993)
