= United Nations Security Council Resolution 906 =

UN Security Council Resolution 906
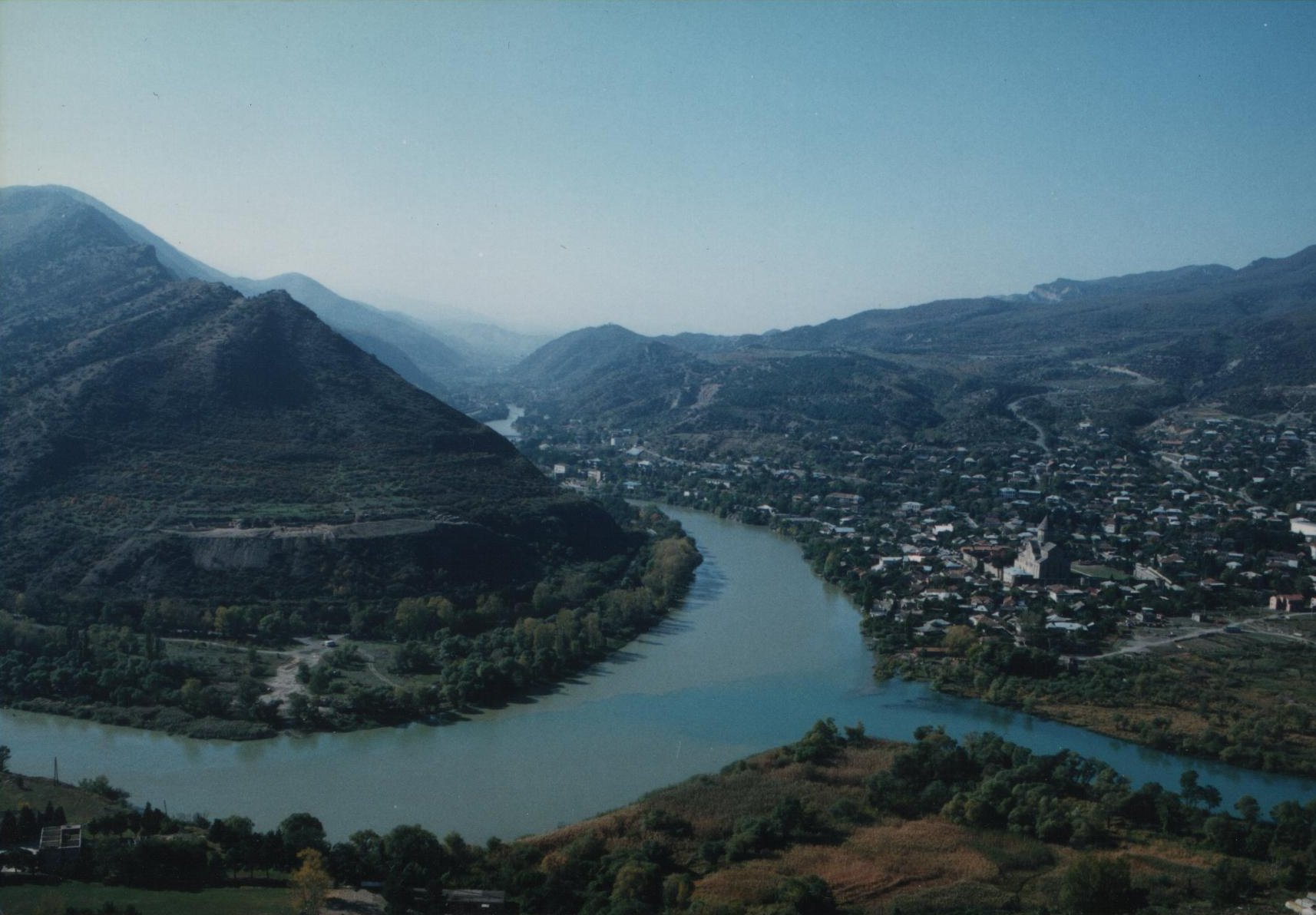
- Mtskheta, former capital of Georgia
- Date: 25 March 1994
- Meeting no.: 3,354
- Code: S/RES/906 (Document)
- Subject: Abkhazia, Georgia
- Voting summary: 15 voted for; None voted against; None abstained
- Result: Adopted

Security Council composition
- Permanent members: China; France; Russia; United Kingdom; United States
- Non-permanent members: Argentina; Brazil; Czech Republic; Djibouti; New Zealand; Nigeria; Oman; Pakistan; Rwanda; Spain

United Nations Security Council resolution 906, adopted unanimously on 25 March 1994, after reaffirming resolutions 849 (1993), 854 (1993), 858 (1993), 876 (1993), 881 (1993), 892 (1993), 896 (1994) and 901 (1994), the council regretted that no agreement on a political settlement had been made between Abkhazia and Georgia, and extended the mandate of the United Nations Observer Mission in Georgia (UNOMIG) until 30 June 1994.

The council stressed the urgent situation in Georgia created by the large numbers of displaced people from Abkhazia and the right for them to return home. It also reaffirmed the territorial integrity and sovereignty of Georgia. Both parties were urged to resume negotiations as soon as possible towards a political settlement and the political status of Abkhazia based on the principles set out in previous security council resolutions, so that the possibility of a peacekeeping force could be considered.

The international community was asked to contribute to Georgia to enable it to overcome the consequences of the conflict. After extending UNOMIG's mandate, it urged the parties in Georgia to ensure the safety of United Nations personnel and allow it freedom of movement. The Secretary-General Boutros Boutros-Ghali was then requested to report back to the council by 21 June 1994, on the progress of the negotiations and the situation on the ground, paying attention to circumstances that may warrant the necessity for a peacekeeping force.

== See also ==
- Agreement on a Cease-fire and Separation of Forces
- Georgian–Abkhazian conflict
- List of United Nations Security Council Resolutions 901 to 1000 (1994–1995)
- United Nations resolutions on Abkhazia
- War in Abkhazia (1992–1993)
