= United Nations Security Council Resolution 901 =

UN Security Council Resolution 901
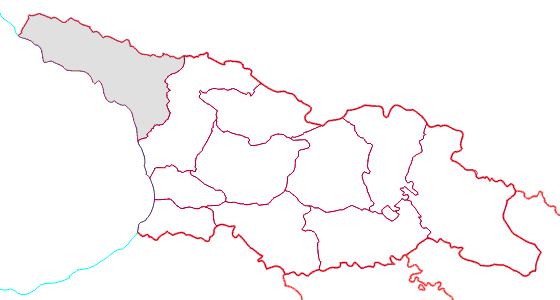
- Abkhazia in Georgia
- Date: 4 March 1994
- Meeting no.: 3,345
- Code: S/RES/901 (Document)
- Subject: Abkhazia, Georgia
- Voting summary: 15 voted for; None voted against; None abstained
- Result: Adopted

Security Council composition
- Permanent members: China; France; Russia; United Kingdom; United States
- Non-permanent members: Argentina; Brazil; Czech Republic; Djibouti; New Zealand; Nigeria; Oman; Pakistan; Rwanda; Spain

United Nations Security Council resolution 901 was adopted unanimously on 4 March 1994. After reaffirming resolutions 849 (1993), 854 (1993), 858 (1993), 876 (1993), 881 (1993), 892 (1993) and 896 (1994), the council extended the mandate of the United Nations Observer Mission in Georgia (UNOMIG) until 31 March 1994.

The council noted the negotiations to be held in New York City on 7 March 1994 following talks held in Geneva on 22–24 February 1994, between the Georgian and Abkhaz sides, urging both to achieve progress as soon as possible so that the council could consider the establishment of a peace-keeping force in Abkhazia. Secretary-General Boutros Boutros-Ghali was requested to report back to the council by 21 March 1994 on developments in the negotiations and situation on the ground.

== See also ==
- Abkhaz–Georgian conflict
- List of United Nations Security Council Resolutions 901 to 1000 (1994–1995)
- United Nations resolutions on Abkhazia
- War in Abkhazia (1992–1993)
