= United Nations Security Council Resolution 1077 =

UN Security Council Resolution 1077
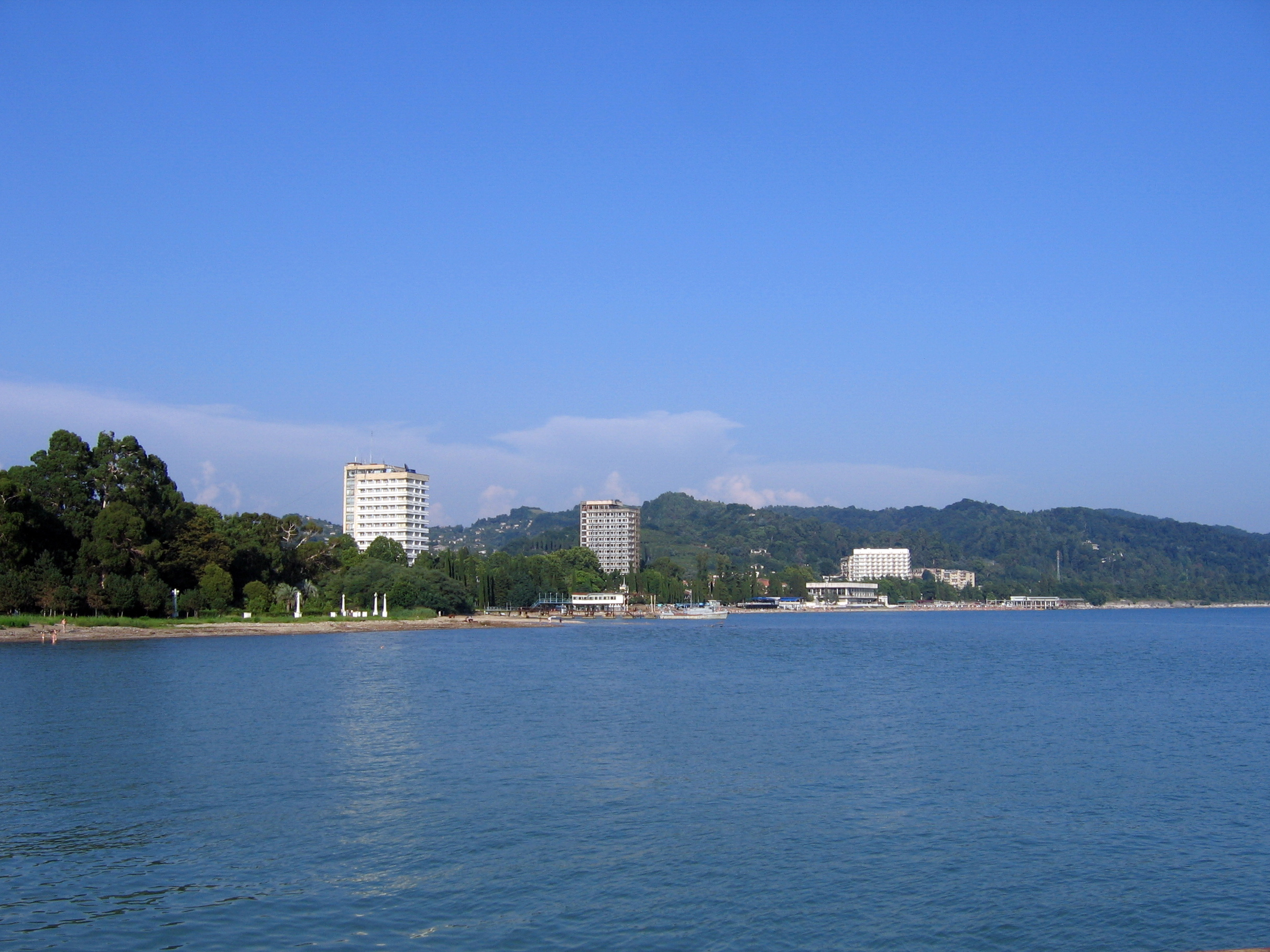
- Sokhumi in Abkhazia
- Date: 22 October 1996
- Meeting no.: 3,707
- Code: S/RES/1077 (Document)
- Subject: The situation in Georgia
- Voting summary: 14 voted for; None voted against; 1 abstained
- Result: Adopted

Security Council composition
- Permanent members: China; France; Russia; United Kingdom; United States
- Non-permanent members: Botswana; Chile; Egypt; Guinea-Bissau; Germany; Honduras; Indonesia; Italy; South Korea; Poland

United Nations Security Council resolution 1077, adopted on 22 October 1996, after reaffirming all resolutions 937 (1994), 1036 (1996) and 1065 (1996) on Georgia, the council established a Human Rights Office in Sokhumi, Georgia as part of the United Nations Observer Mission in Georgia (UNOMIG).

After reiterating its support for the territorial integrity and sovereignty of Georgia, the security council considered a report by the Secretary-General and decided that the newly established Human Rights Office would be under the authority of the Head of Mission of UNOMIG. It was mandated to assist the people of Abkhazia. Program priorities were to be determined from consultations with the secretary-general and Government of Georgia, and follow-up arrangements were to be pursued with the Organization for Security and Co-operation in Europe.

Resolution was adopted by 14 votes to none against, with one abstention from China, which argued that the establishment of the Human Rights Office was out of the terms of reference of the Security Council, and should not set a precedent for future peacekeeping missions.

== See also ==
- Georgian–Abkhazian conflict
- List of United Nations Security Council Resolutions 1001 to 1100 (1995–1997)
- United Nations resolutions on Abkhazia
