= United Nations Security Council Resolution 1716 =

UN Security Council Resolution 1716
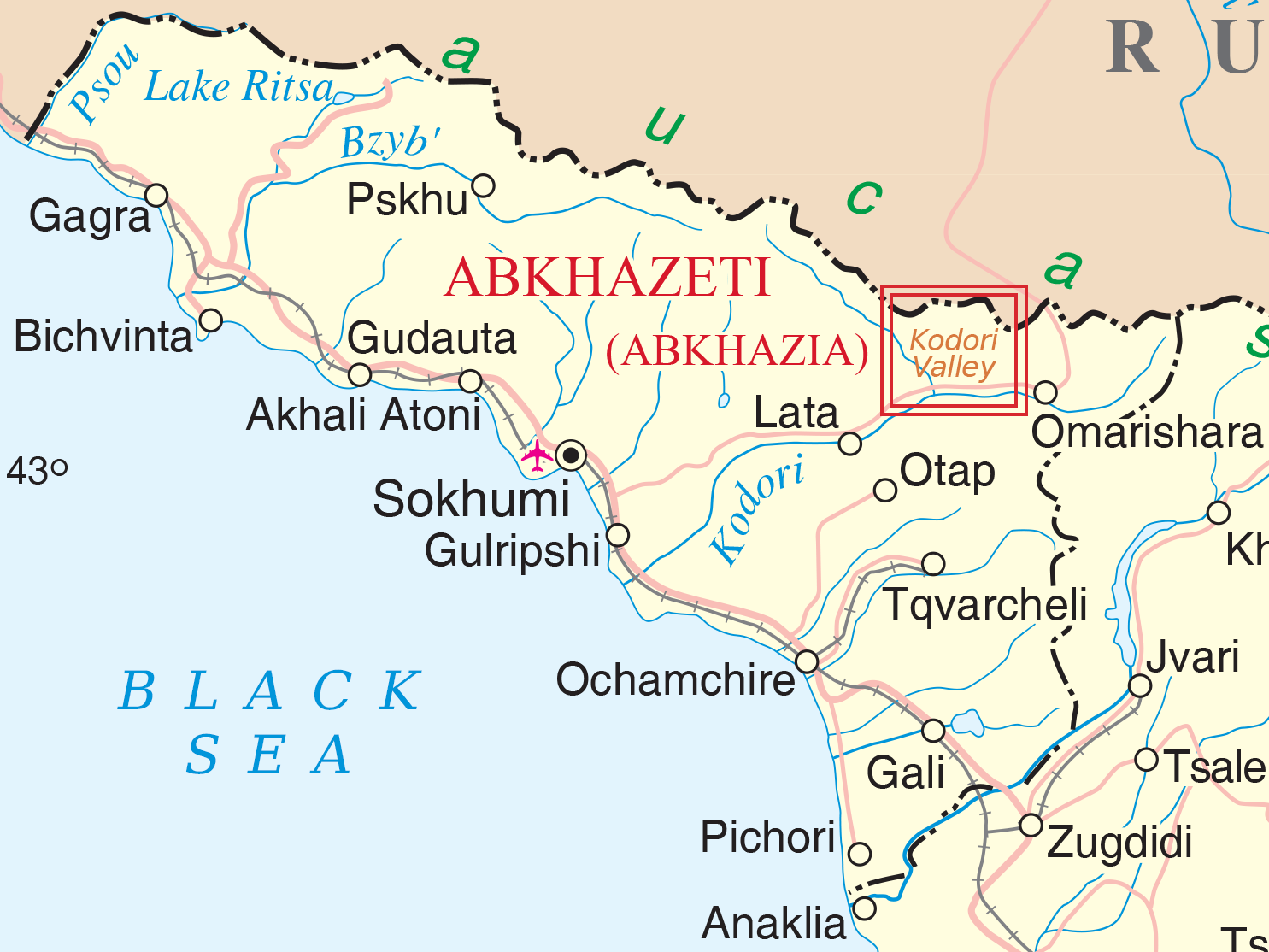
- Kodori Valley in Abkhazia
- Date: 13 October 2006
- Meeting no.: 5,549
- Code: S/RES/1716 (Document)
- Subject: The situation in Georgia
- Voting summary: 15 voted for; None voted against; None abstained
- Result: Adopted

Security Council composition
- Permanent members: China; France; Russia; United Kingdom; United States
- Non-permanent members: Argentina; Rep. of the Congo; Denmark; Ghana; Greece; Japan; Peru; Qatar; Slovakia; Tanzania

United Nations Security Council Resolution 1716, adopted unanimously on October 13, 2006, after reaffirming all resolutions on Abkhazia and Georgia, particularly Resolution 1666 (2006), the Council extended the mandate of the United Nations Observer Mission in Georgia (UNOMIG) until April 15, 2007.

The resolution, drafted by Russia, initially contained references condemning Georgian operations in the Kodori Valley, but these were later modified to express concern.

== Resolution ==
=== Observations ===
The Security Council supported the political efforts of the Secretary-General Kofi Annan, his Special Representative, Russia and Group of Friends of the Secretary-General and the Organisation for Security and Co-operation in Europe (OSCE). It regretted the lack of progress towards a settlement of the Georgian–Abkhazian conflict, and acknowledged that new tensions had emerged due to Georgian operations in the Kodori Valley.

=== Acts ===
The resolution reaffirmed the Council's commitment to the sovereignty and territorial integrity of Georgia within its internationally recognised borders. It reaffirmed the need for a comprehensive settlement based on the principles contained within the "Paper on Basic Principles for the Distribution of Competencies between Tbilisi and Sukhumi", calling on both Georgia and Abkhazia to use all mechanisms contained in previous Security Council resolutions to come to a peaceful settlement. The Council supported efforts by both sides to come up with new solutions to resolve the conflict and to engage in economic co-operation.

Addressing both sides, Council members expressed concern at violations of the Agreement on a Cease-fire and Separation of Forces (Moscow Agreement) and at Georgian operations in the Kodori Valley in July 2006. In this context, it was satisfied that joint patrols by UNOMIG and CIS peacekeeping forces were conducted on a regular basis in the Kodori Valley. All parties were urged to respect the 1994 Moscow Agreement.

Resolution 1716 again called on Georgia to address "legitimate" Abkhaz concerns, while Abkhazia had to address the return of refugees and internally displaced persons, particularly in the Gali region. Both sides were called upon to conclude agreements about nonviolence, the return of refugees and internally displaced persons in the Gali region. At the same time, both Georgia and Abkhazia were praised for presenting ideas as a basis for further dialogue with regards to a settlement of the conflict, and were urged to follow-through their intention to hold a high-level meeting.

The Secretary-General was instructed to look into ways of improving confidence and the welfare and security of residents in the Gali and Zugdidi districts.

The text of the resolution went on to remind both sides to ensure the safety and freedom of movement of UNOMIG, the CIS force and others. Efforts to implement the zero-tolerance sexual exploitation policy were welcomed and the mandate of UNOMIG was extended until April 15, 2007. The Secretary-General was required to report on the situation regularly, particularly developments in the Kodori Valley.

== See also ==
- Georgian–Abkhazian conflict
- List of United Nations Security Council Resolutions 1701 to 1800 (2006–2008)
- United Nations resolutions on Abkhazia
