= United Nations Security Council Resolution 1096 =

UN Security Council Resolution 1096
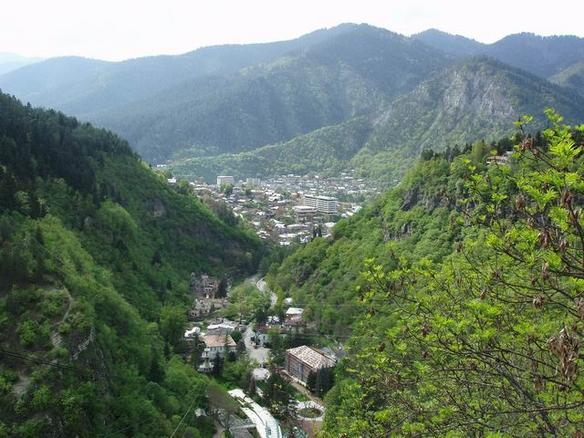
- Borjomi in Georgia
- Date: 30 January 1997
- Meeting no.: 3,735
- Code: S/RES/1096 (Document)
- Subject: The situation in Georgia
- Voting summary: 15 voted for; None voted against; None abstained
- Result: Adopted

Security Council composition
- Permanent members: China; France; Russia; United Kingdom; United States
- Non-permanent members: Chile; Costa Rica; Egypt; Guinea-Bissau; Japan; Kenya; South Korea; Poland; Portugal; Sweden

United Nations Security Council resolution 1096, adopted unanimously on 30 January 1997, after reaffirming all resolutions on Georgia, particularly Resolution 1065 (1996), the Council addressed the current situation extended the mandate of the United Nations Observer Mission in Georgia (UNOMIG) until 31 July 1997.

The Security Council remained concerned that Georgia and Abkhazia had not resolved the conflict, particularly due to the position taken by the Abkhaz side. Noting the opening of the Human Rights Office in Abkhazia (established in Resolution 1077 (1996), respect for human rights was urged. Both sides had violated the Agreement on a Cease-fire and Separation of Forces signed in Moscow in 1994, and there were armed groups operating south of the Inguri River and beyond the control of the Government of Georgia. Meanwhile, the situation in Gali region continued to deteriorate. The Commonwealth of Independent States (CIS) peacekeeping force, also operating in the country, was expanded and its mandate extended until 31 January 1997.

The situation in Georgia was in deadlock and there was no comprehensive settlement of the conflict, while the unacceptability of the Abkhaz position and the 1996 parliamentary election was underlined. In this regard, the intention of the Secretary-General Kofi Annan to strengthen the role of the United Nations in the peace process was welcomed. Both parties were called upon to achieve progress in negotiations and the resumption of high-level talks between both sides was welcomed by the Security Council.

The resolution then addressed the situation affecting refugees returning to Abkhazia. Continued obstructions of this process and attempts to link it to the political status of Abkhazia were condemned along with demographic changes resulting from the conflict, and the right of all refugees and displaced persons to return was reaffirmed. Furthermore, the Security Council condemned all the ethnic violence and the laying of land mines and asked both parties to guarantee the safety and freedom of movement of UNOMIG, the CIS peacekeeping forces and international humanitarian organisations.

Finally, the Secretary-General was requested to report to the Council three months after the adoption of Resolution 1096 on the situation in Abkhazia and the operations of UNOMIG, including a review of its future.

== See also ==
- Georgian–Abkhazian conflict
- List of United Nations Security Council Resolutions 1001 to 1100 (1995–1997)
- United Nations resolutions on Abkhazia
