= United Nations Security Council Resolution 1582 =

UN Security Council Resolution 1582
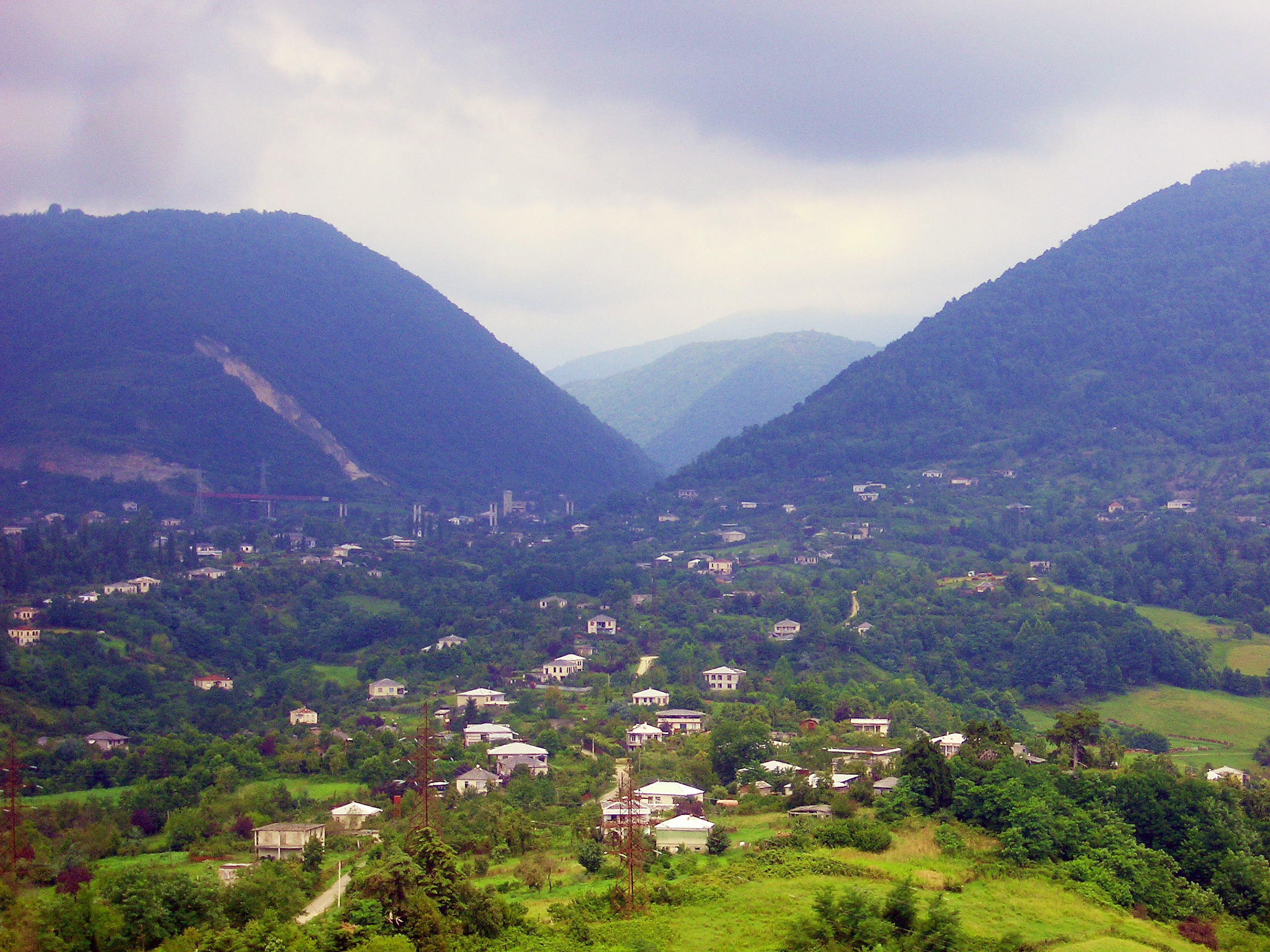
- Kamani village
- Date: 28 January 2005
- Meeting no.: 5,116
- Code: S/RES/1582 (Document)
- Subject: The situation in Georgia
- Voting summary: 15 voted for; None voted against; None abstained
- Result: Adopted

Security Council composition
- Permanent members: China; France; Russia; United Kingdom; United States
- Non-permanent members: Algeria; Argentina; Benin; Brazil; Denmark; Greece; Japan; Philippines; Romania; Tanzania

United Nations Security Council resolution 1582, adopted unanimously on 28 January 2005, after reaffirming all resolutions on Abkhazia and Georgia, particularly Resolution 1554 (2004), the council extended the mandate of the United Nations Observer Mission in Georgia (UNOMIG) until 31 July 2005.

Georgia's attendance at the meeting was opposed by Russia, and therefore the former was not present.

== Resolution ==
=== Observations ===
In the preamble of the resolution, the security council stressed that the lack of progress on a settlement between the two parties was unacceptable. It condemned the shooting down of an UNOMIG helicopter in October 2001 which resulted in nine deaths and deplored that the perpetrators of the attack had not been identified. The contributions of UNOMIG and Commonwealth of Independent States (CIS) peacekeeping forces in the region were welcomed, in addition to the United Nations-led peace process.

=== Acts ===
The security council welcomed political efforts to resolve the situation, in particular the "Basic Principles for the Distribution of Competences between Tbilisi and Sukhumi" to facilitate negotiations between Georgia and Abkhazia. It regretted the lack of progress on political status negotiations and the refusal of Abkhazia to discuss the document, further calling on both sides to overcome their mutual mistrust. The council's position on elections in Abkhazia, described in 1255 (1999), was reaffirmed. All violations of the 1994 Agreement on a Cease-fire and Separation of Forces were condemned. The council also welcomed the calm in the Kodori Valley and the signing of a protocol by both parties on 2 April 2002. Concerns of the civilian population were noted and the Georgian side was asked to guarantee the safety of UNOMIG and CIS troops in the valley. Greater efforts to improve security in the Gali region were encouraged.

The resolution urged the two parties to revitalise the peace process, including greater participation on issues relating to refugees, internally displaced persons, economic co-operation and political and security matters. It also reaffirmed the unacceptability of demographic changes resulting from the conflict. Abkhazia in particular was called upon to improve law enforcement, address the lack of instruction to ethnic Georgians in their first language and ensure the safety of returning refugees.

The council called again on both parties to take measures to identify those responsible for the shooting down of an UNOMIG helicopter in October 2001. Both parties were also asked to dissociate themselves from military rhetoric and demonstrations in support of illegal armed groups, and ensure the safety of United Nations personnel. Furthermore, there were concerns about the security of UNOMIG personnel, with repeated abductions of UNOMIG and CIS peacekeeping personnel, which the Council condemned.

Finally, the Secretary-General Kofi Annan was asked to report on the situation in Abkhazia within three months.

== See also ==
- Georgian–Abkhazian conflict
- List of United Nations Security Council Resolutions 1501 to 1600 (2003–2005)
- United Nations resolutions on Abkhazia
