= United Nations Security Council Resolution 1364 =

UN Security Council Resolution 1364
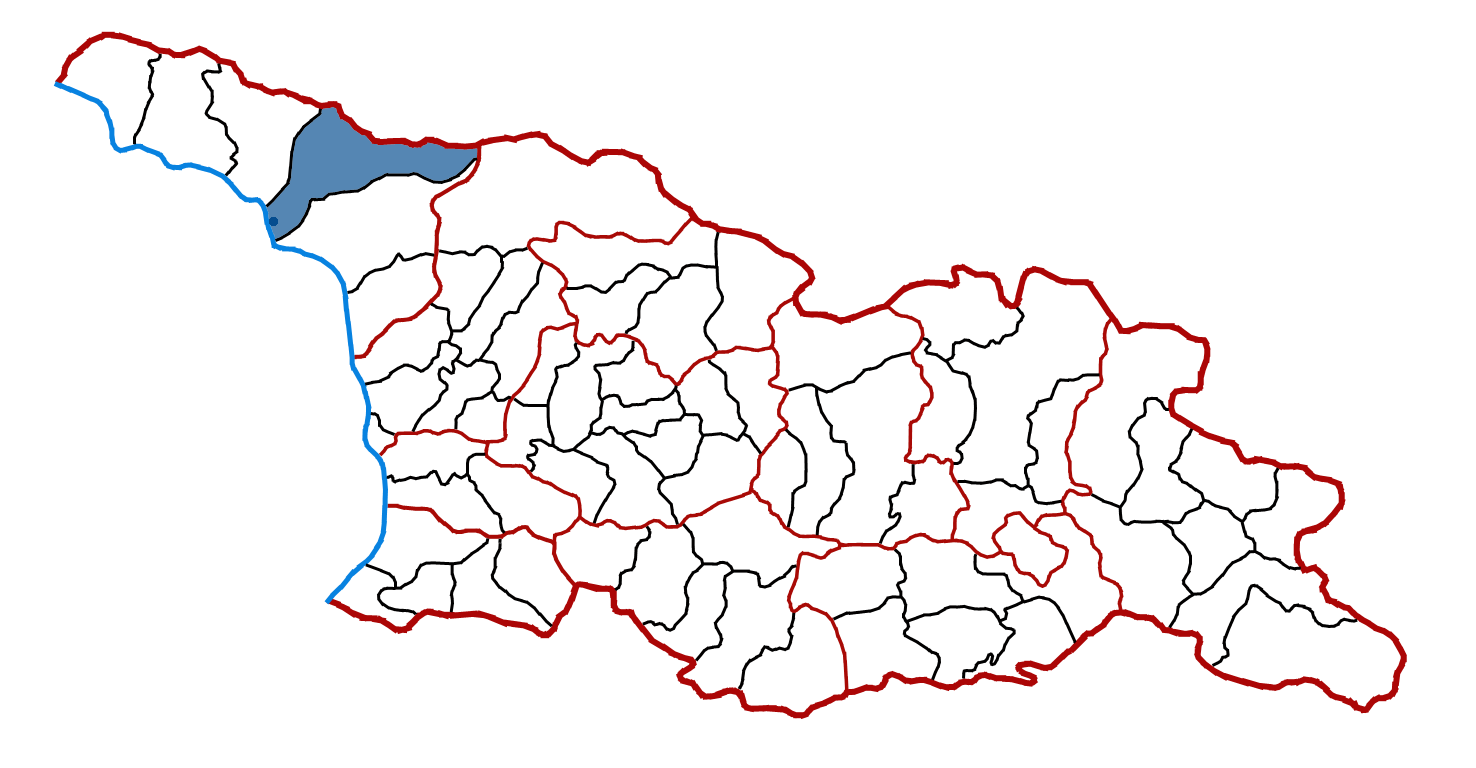
- Gulripshi District in Abkhazia
- Date: 31 July 2001
- Meeting no.: 4,353
- Code: S/RES/1364 (Document)
- Subject: The situation in Georgia
- Voting summary: 15 voted for; None voted against; None abstained
- Result: Adopted

Security Council composition
- Permanent members: China; France; Russia; United Kingdom; United States
- Non-permanent members: Bangladesh; Colombia; Ireland; Jamaica; Mali; Mauritius; Norway; Singapore; Tunisia; Ukraine

United Nations Security Council resolution 1364, adopted unanimously on 31 July 2001, after reaffirming all resolutions on Abkhazia and Georgia, particularly Resolution 1339 (2001), the Council extended the mandate of the United Nations Observer Mission in Georgia (UNOMIG) until 31 January 2002.

In the preamble of the resolution, the Council stressed that the lack of progress on a settlement between the two parties was unacceptable. It was concerned that negotiations had been interrupted by killings and hostage-taking incidents in the Gali and Gulripshi regions, and in Primorsk earlier in 2001.

The Security Council deplored the deterioration of the situation in the conflict zone due to violence, hostage taking, crime and presence of illegal armed groups that threatened the peace process. Both parties, especially the Abkhaz side, were called upon to end the deadlock in discussions and to negotiate on the core issues of the conflict. It also insisted that the parties worked together to clarify such incidents, ensure the release of hostages and to bring the perpetrators to justice.

The resolution reaffirmed the unacceptability of demographic changes resulting from the conflict and all refugees had the right to return. All violations of the 1994 Agreement on a Cease-fire and Separation of Forces were condemned, particularly the military exercises conducted in June and July 2001 by both Georgia and Abkhazia. There was concern at increased restrictions on the freedom of movement of UNOMIG, peacekeeping forces from the Commonwealth of Independent States and other personnel and the Council reminded the parties that they bore responsibility for the safety and security of the personnel.

Finally, the Secretary-General Kofi Annan was called upon to keep the Council regularly informed of developments and to report within three months on the situation.

== See also ==
- Georgian–Abkhazian conflict
- List of United Nations Security Council Resolutions 1301 to 1400 (2000–2002)
- United Nations resolutions on Abkhazia
