= United Nations Security Council Resolution 1187 =

UN Security Council Resolution 1187
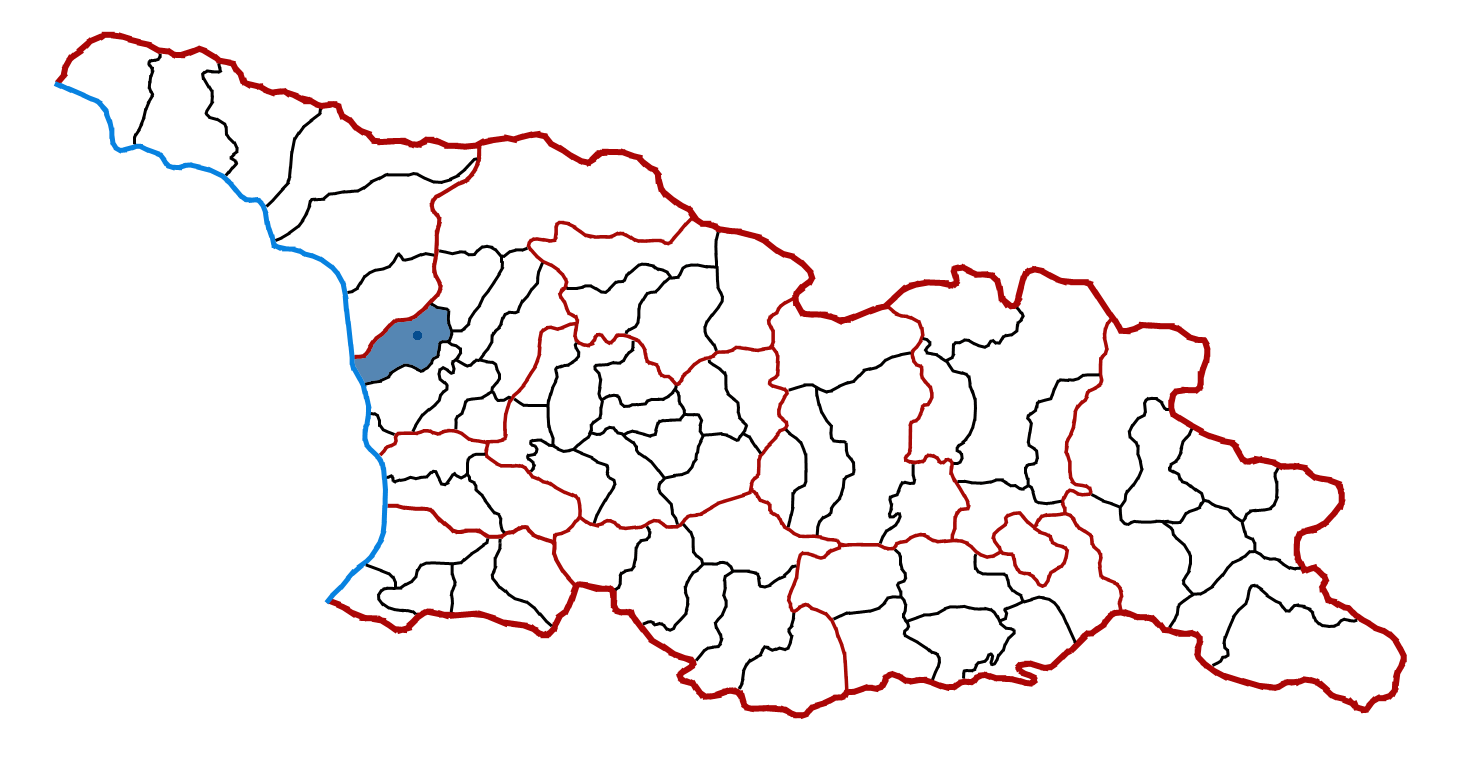
- Zugdidi District in Georgia
- Date: 30 July 1998
- Meeting no.: 3,912
- Code: S/RES/1187 (Document)
- Subject: The situation in Georgia
- Voting summary: 15 voted for; None voted against; None abstained
- Result: Adopted

Security Council composition
- Permanent members: China; France; Russia; United Kingdom; United States
- Non-permanent members: Bahrain; Brazil; Costa Rica; Gabon; Gambia; Japan; Kenya; Portugal; Slovenia; Sweden

United Nations Security Council resolution 1187, adopted unanimously on 30 July 1998, after reaffirming all resolutions on Georgia, particularly Resolution 1150 (1998), the Council extended the mandate of the United Nations Observer Mission in Georgia (UNOMIG) until 31 January 1999, and discussed recent hostilities in the country.

The Security Council was concerned at the tense situation in the districts of Zugdidi and Gali and the risk of fighting. Neither Abkhazia nor Georgia were willing to renounce violence or seek a serious peaceful solution.

There was concern at the resumption of hostilities in May 1998 and both parties were called upon to observe the Agreement on a Cease-fire and Separation of Forces (Moscow Agreement) and other agreements. The parties were asked to establish a joint mechanism to investigate and prevent acts that violate the Moscow Agreement and terrorist acts. The Council reaffirmed the right of all displaced persons and refugees, of which there were a significant number, to return home safely in accordance with international law. In this manner, the deliberate destruction of houses and expulsion of people by the Abkhaz side was condemned, and demographic changes as a result of the conflict were unacceptable.

The parties were summoned immediately to achieve results in the negotiations on key issues. Furthermore, the resolution condemned violence against UNOMIG observers, the re-laying of land mines and attacks by armed groups in the Gali region. There was also concern at a mass media campaign launched in Abkhazia and the harassment of UNOMIG personnel and Abkhazia was called upon to cease such acts. UNOMIG's mandate was extended, subject to a review of the council and of any changes to the mandate of the Commonwealth of Independent States peacekeeping force which was also present in Georgia.

Finally, the Secretary-General Kofi Annan was required to keep the Council informed on developments in the region and matters relating to UNOMIG's mandate; a review of its mandate would take place.

== See also ==
- Georgian–Abkhazian conflict
- List of United Nations Security Council Resolutions 1101 to 1200 (1997–1998)
- United Nations resolutions on Abkhazia
