= United Nations Security Council Resolution 1287 =

UN Security Council Resolution 1287
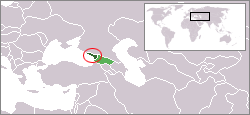
- Abkhazia (circled)
- Date: 31 January 2000
- Meeting no.: 4,094
- Code: S/RES/1287 (Document)
- Subject: The situation in Georgia
- Voting summary: 15 voted for; None voted against; None abstained
- Result: Adopted

Security Council composition
- Permanent members: China; France; Russia; United Kingdom; United States
- Non-permanent members: Argentina; Bangladesh; Canada; Jamaica; Malaysia; Mali; Namibia; Netherlands; Tunisia; Ukraine

United Nations Security Council resolution 1287, adopted unanimously on 31 January 2000, after reaffirming all resolutions on Georgia, particularly Resolution 1255 (1999), the Council extended the mandate of the United Nations Observer Mission in Georgia (UNOMIG) until 31 July 2000.

The security council emphasised the unacceptability of the lack of progress with key issues relating to the Abkhazia conflict. It welcomed recent commitments from both parties to investigate violations of the 1994 Agreement on a Cease-fire and Separation of Forces and resume negotiations. There was concern that although the situation remained calm, the situation in the conflict zone was volatile. Efforts to address prevention and control of diseases such as HIV/AIDS and others were welcomed.

Secretary-General Kofi Annan had appointed a new special representative and the parties were encouraged to use the opportunity to connect and resume the peace process. Both Georgia and Abkhazia were urged to achieve progress on key issues such as the distribution of constitutional competences between Tbilisi and Sukhumi.

The resolution reiterated the need for both parties to respect human rights, the importance of implementing confidence-building measures, and the fact that elections in Abkhazia were unacceptable and illegitimate. The Secretary-General was requested to report regularly to the council on developments.

== See also ==
- Georgian–Abkhazian conflict
- List of United Nations Security Council Resolutions 1201 to 1300 (1998–2000)
- United Nations resolutions on Abkhazia
