= United Nations Security Council Resolution 1311 =

UN Security Council Resolution 1311
- Georgia
- Date: 28 July 2000
- Meeting no.: 4,179
- Code: S/RES/1311 (Document)
- Subject: The situation in Georgia
- Voting summary: 15 voted for; None voted against; None abstained
- Result: Adopted

Security Council composition
- Permanent members: China; France; Russia; United Kingdom; United States
- Non-permanent members: Argentina; Bangladesh; Canada; Jamaica; Malaysia; Mali; Namibia; Netherlands; Tunisia; Ukraine

United Nations Security Council resolution 1311, adopted unanimously on 28 July 2000, after reaffirming all resolutions on Georgia, particularly resolutions 1287 (1999) and 1308 (2000), the Council extended the mandate of the United Nations Observer Mission in Georgia (UNOMIG) until 31 January 2001.

The Security Council emphasised the unacceptability of the lack of progress with key issues relating to the Abkhazia conflict. It recalled that both sides should meet every two months. On 11 July 2000 the parties signed a protocol on the stabilisation of the security zone, to work harder on the return of refugees to the Gali region and economic recovery.

The resolution urged both parties to continue to negotiate outstanding issues, including the division of powers between Tbilisi and Sukhumi. The parties had promised not to use violence to resolve the issues. The Security Council affirmed once more that demographic changes due to the conflict were unacceptable and called for the return of refugees to the Gali region. It further deplored violence and criminal activity in the conflict zone and demanded that both parties respect the 1994 Agreement on a Cease-fire and Separation of Forces.

== See also ==
- Georgian–Abkhazian conflict
- List of United Nations Security Council Resolutions 1301 to 1400 (2000–2002)
- United Nations resolutions on Abkhazia
