= United Nations Security Council Resolution 896 =

1994 United Nations Security Council resolution on Georgia

UN Security Council Resolution 896
- Georgia and disputed regions
- Date: 31 January 1994
- Meeting no.: 3,332
- Code: S/RES/896 (Document)
- Subject: Abkhazia, Georgia
- Voting summary: 15 voted for; None voted against; None abstained
- Result: Adopted

Security Council composition
- Permanent members: China; France; Russia; United Kingdom; United States
- Non-permanent members: Argentina; Brazil; Czech Republic; Djibouti; New Zealand; Nigeria; Oman; Pakistan; Rwanda; Spain

United Nations Security Council resolution 896, adopted unanimously on 31 January 1994, after reaffirming resolutions 849 (1993), 854 (1993), 858 (1993), 876 (1993), 881 (1993) and 892 (1993) on the Georgian–Abkhazian war and Resolution 868 (1993) concerning the safety of United Nations peacekeepers, the Council considered the possible establishment of peacekeeping force in Abkhazia and Georgia, and discussed the peace process.

The Security Council welcomed the signing of a Communique of the second round of negotiations in Geneva, in which the memorandum of understanding was stressed and the importance of both parties to abide by their obligations. The parties were also in favour of a United Nations peacekeeping force or other forces in the region, subject to authorisation by the United Nations. The Council took note of talks to be held in Moscow on 8 February 1994, and the intention of the Secretary-General Boutros Boutros-Ghali and his Special Representative to convene a new round of negotiations on 22 February 1994. The seriousness of the situation in Georgia, where nearly 300,000 displaced persons from Abkhazia were present, was recognised.

The parties were summoned as soon as possible to resume negotiations and indicate their willingness to find a solution, in which the sovereignty and territorial integrity of Georgia had to be respected. At the same time it was stressed that progress must be made on the political status of Abkhazia. The mandate of the United Nations Observer Mission in Georgia (UNOMIG) was extended until 7 March 1994, with a view to increasing its strength if necessary.

Two options proposed by the Secretary-General on the establishment of a peacekeeping mission in Abkhazia, Georgia, were noted and he was also requested to report on progress in the third round of negotiations and any circumstances under which such a force would be needed. This would be dependent on progress made in the talks.

The resolution recognised that all refugees and displaced persons had the right to return, and all parties should fulfil their commitments in this regard and agree a timetable. All attempts to change the demographic composition of Abkhazia by repopulating it by persons not previously resident there were condemned. Finally, all parties were urged to respect the ceasefire and guarantee the safety of United Nations personnel, and Member States were urged to contribute donations to Georgia to help it overcome the consequences of the conflict.

== See also ==
- Georgian–Abkhazian conflict
- List of United Nations Security Council Resolutions 801 to 900 (1993–1994)
- United Nations resolutions on Abkhazia
