= United Nations Security Council Resolution 1393 =

UN Security Council Resolution 1393
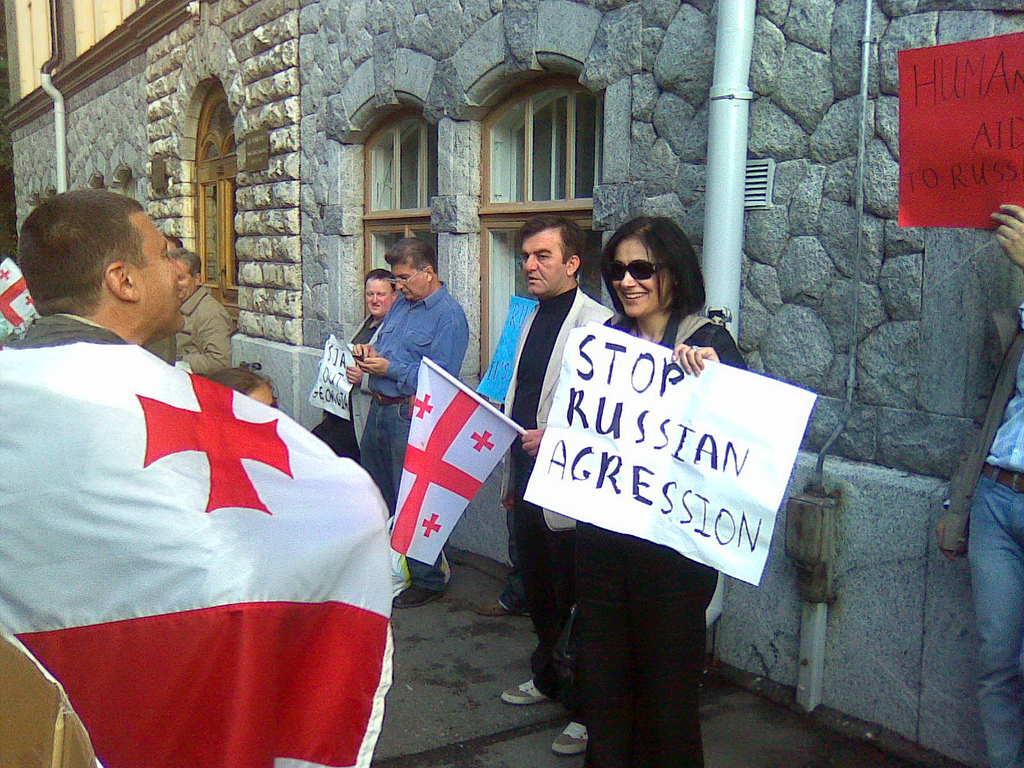
- Protest in favor of Georgia
- Date: 31 January 2002
- Meeting no.: 4,464
- Code: S/RES/1393 (Document)
- Subject: The situation in Georgia
- Voting summary: 15 voted for; None voted against; None abstained
- Result: Adopted

Security Council composition
- Permanent members: China; France; Russia; United Kingdom; United States
- Non-permanent members: Bulgaria; Cameroon; Colombia; Guinea; Ireland; Mauritius; Mexico; Norway; Singapore; Syria

United Nations Security Council resolution 1393, adopted unanimously on 31 January 2002, after reaffirming all resolutions on Abkhazia and Georgia, particularly Resolution 1364 (2001), the Council extended the mandate of the United Nations Observer Mission in Georgia (UNOMIG) until 31 July 2002.

== Resolution ==
=== Observations ===
In the preamble of the resolution, the Council stressed that the lack of progress on a settlement between the two parties was unacceptable. It condemned the shooting down of an UNOMIG helicopter in October 2001 which resulted in nine deaths, and deplored that the perpetrators of the attack had not been identified.

=== Acts ===
The security council welcomed political efforts to resolve the situation, in particular the "Basic Principles for the Distribution of Competences between Tbilisi and Sukhumi" to facilitate negotiations between Georgia and Abkhazia. It urged Abkhazia to consider the details of the document and for both sides to overcome their mutual mistrust. All violations of the 1994 Agreement on a Cease-fire and Separation of Forces were condemned. The council also welcomed the signing of a protocol by both parties on the situation in the Kodori Valley on 17 January 2002 and urged Georgia in particular to implement its provisions and for Abkhazia not to take advantage of the Georgian withdrawal.

The resolution urged the two parties to revitalise the peace process, regretted the lack of progress on issues relating to refugees and internally displaced persons and reaffirmed the unacceptability of demographic changes resulting from the conflict. Both Georgia and Abkhazia were urged to implement recommendations from a joint assessment mission to the Gali region, with Abkhazia in particular called upon to improve law enforcement and address the lack of instruction to ethnic Georgians in their first language.

There was concern at increased restrictions on the freedom of movement of UNOMIG, peacekeeping forces from the Commonwealth of Independent States and other personnel and the Council reminded the parties that they bore responsibility for the safety and security of the personnel. Furthermore, the resolution called for both parties to take measures to identify those responsible for the shooting down of an UNOMIG helicopter in October 2001. Georgia was reminded to prevent activities of illegal armed groups crossing into Abkhazia.

Finally, the Secretary-General Kofi Annan was called upon to keep the Council regularly informed of developments and to report within three months on the situation.

== See also ==
- Georgian–Abkhazian conflict
- List of United Nations Security Council Resolutions 1301 to 1400 (2000–2002)
- United Nations resolutions on Abkhazia
