= United Nations Security Council Resolution 1656 =

UN Security Council Resolution 1656
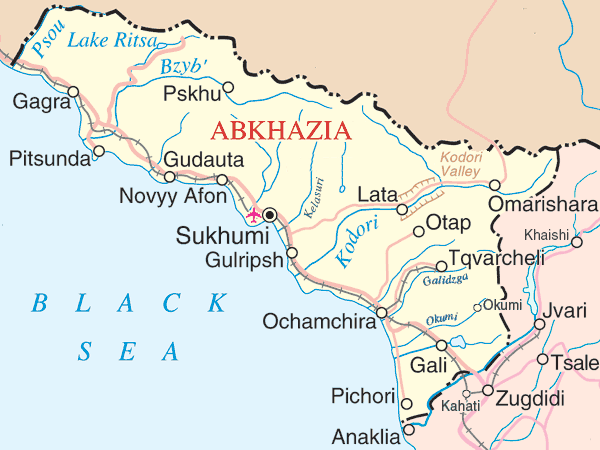
- Abkhazia
- Date: 31 January 2006
- Meeting no.: 5,363
- Code: S/RES/1656 (Document)
- Subject: The situation in Georgia
- Voting summary: 15 voted for; None voted against; None abstained
- Result: Adopted

Security Council composition
- Permanent members: China; France; Russia; United Kingdom; United States
- Non-permanent members: Argentina; Rep. of the Congo; Denmark; Ghana; Greece; Japan; Peru; Qatar; Slovakia; Tanzania

United Nations Security Council Resolution 1656, was adopted unanimously on January 31, 2006, after reaffirming all resolutions on Abkhazia and Georgia, particularly Resolution 1615 (2005). The Council extended the mandate of the United Nations Observer Mission in Georgia (UNOMIG) until March 31, 2006.

In his report on the situation, the Secretary-General Kofi Annan had recommended an extension until July 31, 2006, though this was not adopted by Council members, due to the insistence of Russia.

== See also ==
- Georgian–Abkhazian conflict
- List of United Nations Security Council Resolutions 1601 to 1700 (2005–2006)
- United Nations resolutions on Abkhazia
