= United Nations Security Council Resolution 1339 =

UN Security Council Resolution 1339
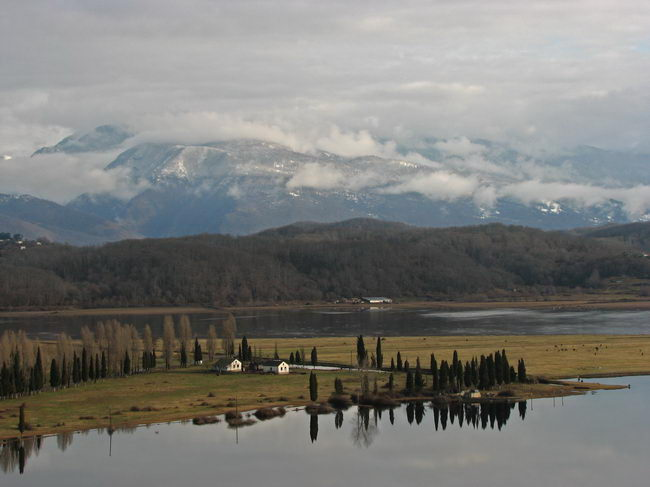
- Pitsunda in Abkhazia
- Date: 31 January 2001
- Meeting no.: 4,269
- Code: S/RES/1311 (Document)
- Subject: The situation in Georgia
- Voting summary: 15 voted for; None voted against; None abstained
- Result: Adopted

Security Council composition
- Permanent members: China; France; Russia; United Kingdom; United States
- Non-permanent members: Bangladesh; Colombia; Ireland; Jamaica; Mali; Mauritius; Norway; Singapore; Tunisia; Ukraine

United Nations Security Council resolution 1339, adopted unanimously on 31 January 2001, after reaffirming all resolutions on Abkhazia and Georgia, particularly Resolution 1311 (2000), the Council extended the mandate of the United Nations Observer Mission in Georgia (UNOMIG) until 31 July 2001.

In the preamble of the resolution, the Council stressed that the lack of progress on a settlement between the two parties was unacceptable. The situation remained calm though the conflict zone remained volatile and UNOMIG and peacekeeping troops from the Commonwealth of Independent States (CIS) had made important contributions towards the stabilisation of the region.

The Security Council supported the efforts of the Secretary-General Kofi Annan and his Special Representative and others to promote the stabilisation of the situation. The Special Representative was to submit a proposal regarding the distribution of constitutional competences between Tbilisi and Sukhumi; the need to increase efforts for a draft proposal on economic rehabilitation and the return of refugees to the Gali region was stressed. The Abkhaz side in particular was urged to engage in negotiations, and Ukraine was to hold the third meeting between the two sides concerning confidence-building measures in March 2001.

The resolution reaffirmed the unacceptability of demographic changes resulting from the conflict and all refugees had the right to return. All violations of the 1994 Agreement on a Cease-fire and Separation of Forces were condemned, particularly the military exercise involving the use of heavy weapons in November 2000 that was noted in the Secretary-General's report. At the same time, increased criminality and activity by armed groups was deplored as it had a destabilising effect. The abduction of two UNOMIG military observers in December 2000 was condemned and the need for both parties to ensure the security, safety and freedom of movement of UNOMIG and CIS peacekeeping forces was reiterated.

Finally, the Secretary-General was called upon to keep the Council regularly informed of developments and to report within three months on the situation.

== See also ==
- Georgian–Abkhazian conflict
- List of United Nations Security Council Resolutions 1301 to 1400 (2000–2002)
- United Nations resolutions on Abkhazia
