= United Nations resolutions on Abkhazia =

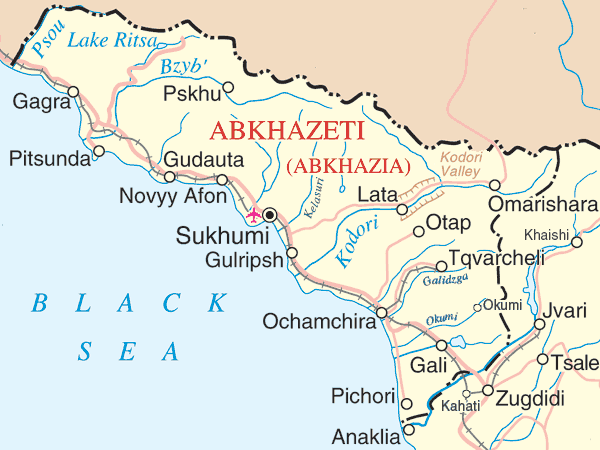
United Nations map of Abkhazia

The Security Council of the United Nations passed 32 resolutions where it recognizes Abkhazia as an integral part of Georgia and supports its territorial integrity according to the principles of the international law. The UN is urging both sides to settle the Georgian–Abkhazian conflict through peaceful means by intensifying diplomatic dialogue and ratifying the final accord about the status of Abkhazia in the Georgian Constitution. Moreover, the United Nations calls for immediate return of all expelled ethnic Georgians (approximately 250,000) and determining the final status of Abkhazia as maximum autonomy or federative structure within the borders of the Georgian state. The resolutions also commend Russia's role as a peacekeeper and facilitator towards a resolution of the conflict. Resolution 1716 also urges Georgia to ensure that no troops are present in the Kodori Gorge and asks Georgia to refrain from provocative actions in the Kodori Gorge.

Many of the resolutions relate to the establishment and extension of the United Nations Observer Mission in Georgia.

On May 15, 2008, the United Nations General Assembly adopted a non-binding resolution recognising the right of all refugees (including victims of reported “ethnic cleansing”) to return to Abkhazia and their property rights. It "regretted" the attempts to alter pre-war demographic composition and called for the "rapid development of a timetable to ensure the prompt voluntary return of all refugees and internally displaced persons to their homes."

The following are United Nations resolutions adopted by the Security Council with regards to Abkhazia:

- United Nations Security Council Resolution 849 (July 9, 1993);
- United Nations Security Council Resolution 854 (August 6, 1993);
- United Nations Security Council Resolution 858 (August 24, 1993);
- United Nations Security Council Resolution 876 (October 19, 1993);
- United Nations Security Council Resolution 881 (November 4, 1993);
- United Nations Security Council Resolution 892 (December 22, 1993);
- United Nations Security Council Resolution 896 (January 31, 1994);
- United Nations Security Council Resolution 901 (March 4, 1994);
- United Nations Security Council Resolution 906 (March 25, 1994);
- United Nations Security Council Resolution 934 (June 30, 1994);
- United Nations Security Council Resolution 937 (July 21, 1994);
- United Nations Security Council Resolution 971 (January 12, 1995);
- United Nations Security Council Resolution 993 (May 12, 1995);
- United Nations Security Council Resolution 1036 (January 12, 1996);
- United Nations Security Council Resolution 1065 (July 12, 1996);
- United Nations Security Council Resolution 1077 (October 22, 1996);
- United Nations Security Council Resolution 1096 (January 30, 1997);
- United Nations Security Council Resolution 1124 (July 30, 1997);
- United Nations Security Council Resolution 1150 (January 30, 1998);
- United Nations Security Council Resolution 1187 (July 30, 1998);
- United Nations Security Council Resolution 1225 (January 28, 1999);
- United Nations Security Council Resolution 1255 (July 30, 1999);
- United Nations Security Council Resolution 1287 (January 31, 2000);
- United Nations Security Council Resolution 1311 (July 28, 2000);
- United Nations Security Council Resolution 1339 (January 31, 2001);
- United Nations Security Council Resolution 1364 (July 31, 2001);
- United Nations Security Council Resolution 1393 (January 31, 2002);
- United Nations Security Council Resolution 1427 (July 29, 2002);
- United Nations Security Council Resolution 1462 (January 30, 2003);
- United Nations Security Council Resolution 1494 (July 30, 2003);
- United Nations Security Council Resolution 1524 (January 30, 2004);
- United Nations Security Council Resolution 1554 (July 29, 2004);
- United Nations Security Council Resolution 1582 (January 28, 2005);
- United Nations Security Council Resolution 1615 (July 29, 2005);
- United Nations Security Council Resolution 1656 (January 31, 2006);
- United Nations Security Council Resolution 1716 (October 13, 2006);
- UN Security Council Resolution 1752 (April 13, 2007);
- UN Security Council Resolution 1781 (October 15, 2007);
- United Nations Security Council Resolution 1808 (April 15, 2008);
- UN General Assembly Resolution GA/10708 (May 15, 2008).
- Status of internally displaced persons and refugees from Abkhazia, Georgia and the Tskhinvali region/South Ossetia, Georgia : resolution / adopted by the General Assembly (2009)
- Status of internally displaced persons and refugees from Abkhazia, Georgia, and the Tskhinvali region/South Ossetia, Georgia : resolution / adopted by the General Assembly (2016)
- Status of internally displaced persons and refugees from Abkhazia, Georgia, and the Tskhinvali region/South Ossetia, Georgia : resolution / adopted by the General Assembly (2017)
- Status of internally displaced persons and refugees from Abkhazia, Georgia and the Tskhinvali region/South Ossetia, Georgia : resolution / adopted by the General Assembly (June 1, 2018)
- Status of internally displaced persons and refugees from Abkhazia, Georgia, and the Tskhinvali region/South Ossetia, Georgia : resolution / adopted by the General Assembly (June 4, 2019)
- Status of internally displaced persons and refugees from Abkhazia, Georgia, and the Tskhinvali region/South Ossetia, Georgia (September 8, 2020)
