= United Nations Security Council Resolution 1427 =

UN Security Council Resolution 1427
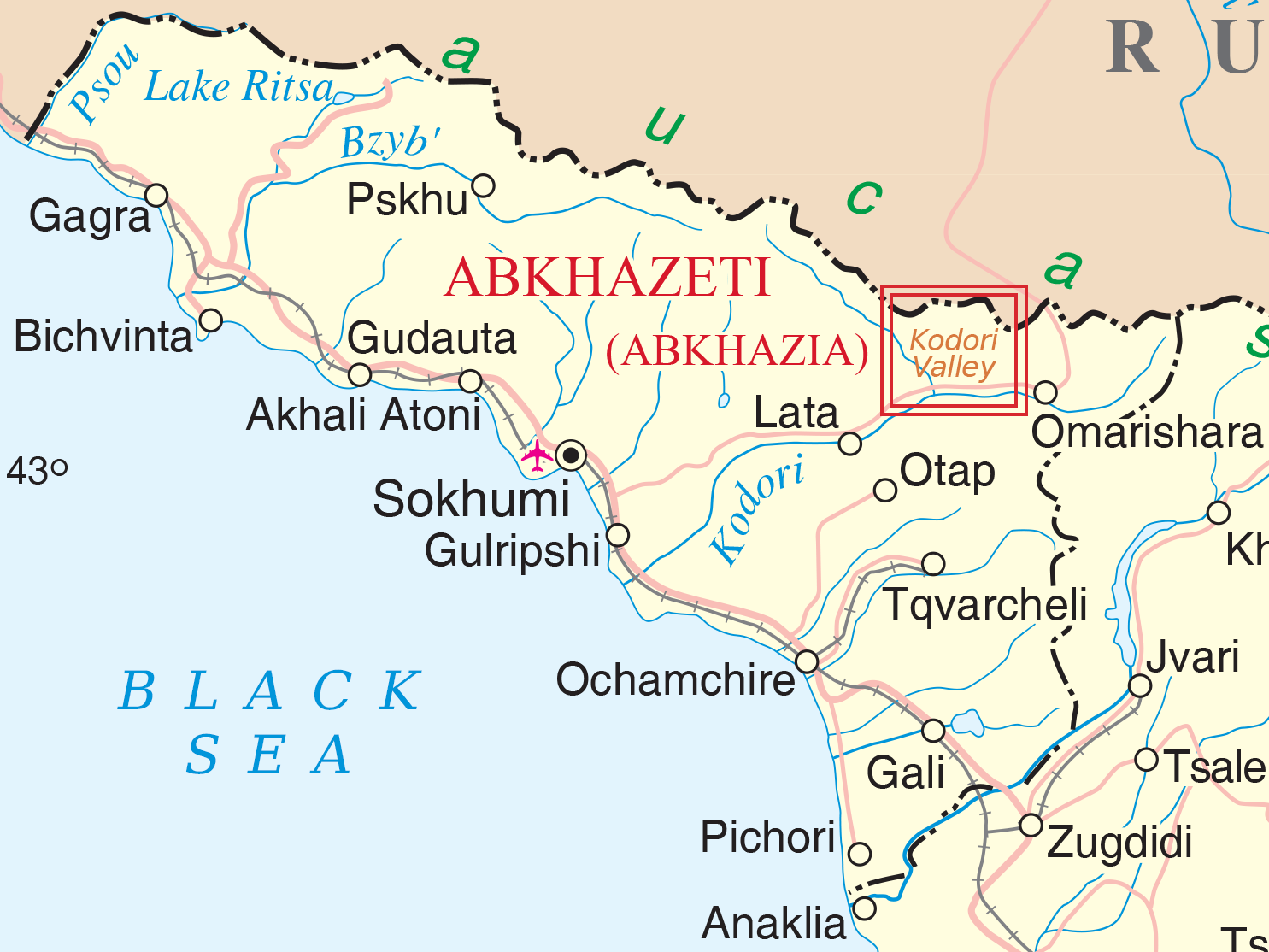
- The Kodori Valley in Abkhazia
- Date: 29 July 2002
- Meeting no.: 4,591
- Code: S/RES/1427 (Document)
- Subject: The situation in Georgia
- Voting summary: 15 voted for; None voted against; None abstained
- Result: Adopted

Security Council composition
- Permanent members: China; France; Russia; United Kingdom; United States
- Non-permanent members: Bulgaria; Cameroon; Colombia; Guinea; Ireland; Mauritius; Mexico; Norway; Singapore; Syria

United Nations Security Council resolution 1427, adopted unanimously on 29 July 2002, after reaffirming all resolutions on Abkhazia and Georgia, particularly Resolution 1393 (2002), the Council extended the mandate of the United Nations Observer Mission in Georgia (UNOMIG) until 31 January 2003.

== Resolution ==
=== Observations ===
In the preamble of the resolution, the Council stressed that the lack of progress on a settlement between the two parties was unacceptable. It condemned the shooting down of an UNOMIG helicopter in October 2001 which resulted in nine deaths and deplored that the perpetrators of the attack had not been identified. An extension of the mandate of the Commonwealth of Independent States (CIS) peacekeeping force in the region was welcomed.

=== Acts ===
The Security Council welcomed political efforts to resolve the situation, in particular the "Basic Principles for the Distribution of Competences between Tbilisi and Sukhumi" to facilitate negotiations between Georgia and Abkhazia. It regretted the refusal of Abkhazia to consider the details of the document and called on both sides to overcome their mutual mistrust. All violations of the 1994 Agreement on a Cease-fire and Separation of Forces were condemned. The council also welcomed the easing of tensions in the Kodori Valley and the signing of a protocol by both parties on 2 April 2002. Concerns of the civilian population were noted and the Georgian side was asked to guarantee the safety of UNOMIG and CIS troops in the valley.

The resolution urged the two parties to revitalise the peace process, called for urgent progress to be made on issues relating to refugees and internally displaced persons and reaffirmed the unacceptability of demographic changes resulting from the conflict. Both Georgia and Abkhazia were urged to implement recommendations from a joint assessment mission to the Gali region, with Abkhazia in particular called upon to improve law enforcement, address the lack of instruction to ethnic Georgians in their first language and ensure the safety of returning refugees.

The council called again on both parties to take measures to identify those responsible for the shooting down of an UNOMIG helicopter in October 2001. Both parties were also asked to dissociate themselves from military rhetoric and illegal armed groups. Finally, the secretary-general Kofi Annan was called upon to keep the council regularly informed of developments and to report within three months on the situation.

== See also ==
- Georgian–Abkhazian conflict
- List of United Nations Security Council Resolutions 1401 to 1500 (2002–2003)
- United Nations resolutions on Abkhazia
