= United Nations Security Council Resolution 1065 =

1996 United Nations Security Council resolution on Georgia

UN Security Council Resolution 1065
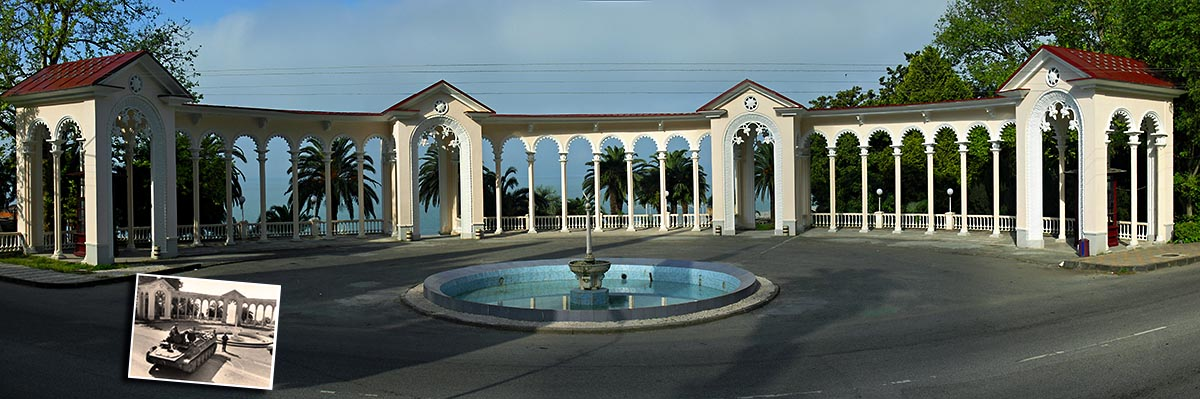
- A colonnade in the coastal town of Gagra
- Date: 12 July 1996
- Meeting no.: 3,680
- Code: S/RES/1065 (Document)
- Subject: The situation in Georgia
- Voting summary: 15 voted for; None voted against; None abstained
- Result: Adopted

Security Council composition
- Permanent members: China; France; Russia; United Kingdom; United States
- Non-permanent members: Botswana; Chile; Egypt; Guinea-Bissau; Germany; Honduras; Indonesia; Italy; South Korea; Poland

United Nations Security Council resolution 1065, adopted unanimously on 12 July 1996, after reaffirming all resolutions on Georgia, particularly 1036 (1996), the Council discussed efforts for a political settlement between Georgia and Abkhazia and extended the mandate of the United Nations Observer Mission in Georgia (UNOMIG) until 31 January 1997.

Concern was expressed by the Council at the lack of breakthrough in talks between both sides, particularly due to the position taken by the Abkhaz side. The Agreement on a Cease-fire and Separation of Forces was generally respected by both parties. While it recognised that UNOMIG and peacekeeping forces from the Commonwealth of Independent States (CIS) had contributed greatly to the security situation, the deteriorating situation in the Gali region.

Negotiations to resolve the conflict were delayed. The resolution reaffirmed the territorial integrity, sovereignty and independence of Georgia, and the necessity of defining Abkhazia within these principles. It also noted the right of all refugees and displaced persons to return home safely and attempts by the Abkhaz side to hinder this process were condemned. Demographic changes as a result of the conflict were unacceptable, as were ethnically motivated killings and violence, and the laying of land mines.

The mandate of UNOMIG was extended until 31 January 1997 and would be revised should the mandate of the CIS peacekeeping force change. Finally, the Secretary-General Boutros Boutros-Ghali was requested in the three months to report on the situation in Abkhazia and the operations of UNOMIG.

== See also ==
- Georgian–Abkhazian conflict
- List of United Nations Security Council Resolutions 1001 to 1100 (1995–1997)
- United Nations resolutions on Abkhazia
- War in Abkhazia (1992–1993)
