= United Nations Security Council Resolution 1225 =

UN Security Council Resolution 1225
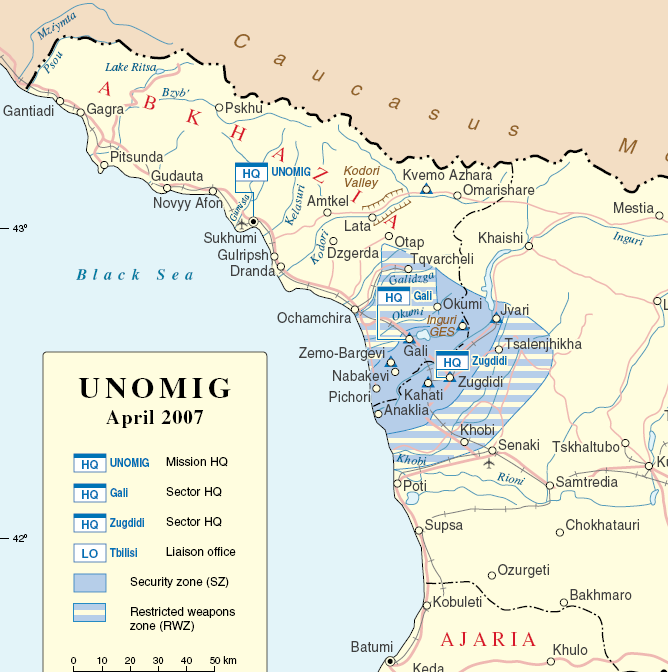
- UNOMIG operation area
- Date: 28 January 1999
- Meeting no.: 3,972
- Code: S/RES/1225 (Document)
- Subject: The situation in Georgia
- Voting summary: 15 voted for; None voted against; None abstained
- Result: Adopted

Security Council composition
- Permanent members: China; France; Russia; United Kingdom; United States
- Non-permanent members: Argentina; Bahrain; Brazil; Canada; Gabon; Gambia; Malaysia; Namibia; Netherlands; Slovenia

United Nations Security Council resolution 1225, adopted unanimously on 28 January 1999, after reaffirming all resolutions on Georgia, particularly Resolution 1187 (1998), the Council extended the mandate of the United Nations Observer Mission in Georgia (UNOMIG) until 31 July 1999, and expressed an intention to review its mandate.

The situation in the conflict zone remained tense and unstable, and negotiations between Georgia and Abkhazia were in deadlock, the Council observed. It recognised that the presence of peacekeepers from UNOMIG and the Commonwealth of Independent States (CIS) had stabilised the situation. The parties had to respect human rights and the Security Council supported the efforts of the Secretary-General Kofi Annan to find ways to improve their observance.

The parties held a meeting in Athens in October 1998 but were unable to agree on confidence measures, security, the return of refugees and economic reconstruction. The Security Council demanded that both sides return to negotiations and commit themselves to the peace process. They were also urged to adhere to the Agreement on a Cease-fire and Separation of Forces.

Meanwhile, the refugee situation remained a concern and the Security Council reiterated that demographic changes caused by the conflict were unacceptable. It condemned activities by armed groups, including the laying of land mines, which obstructed the work of humanitarian organisations and delayed the normalisation of the situation in the Gali region. Both parties were urged to take action to end such activities.

The resolution concluded by asking the Secretary-General to report within three months on the situation, and expressing its intention to review the UNOMIG operation at the end of its current mandate.

== See also ==
- Georgian–Abkhazian conflict
- List of United Nations Security Council Resolutions 1201 to 1300 (1998–2000)
- United Nations resolutions on Abkhazia
