= United Nations Security Council Resolution 1150 =

UN Security Council Resolution 1150
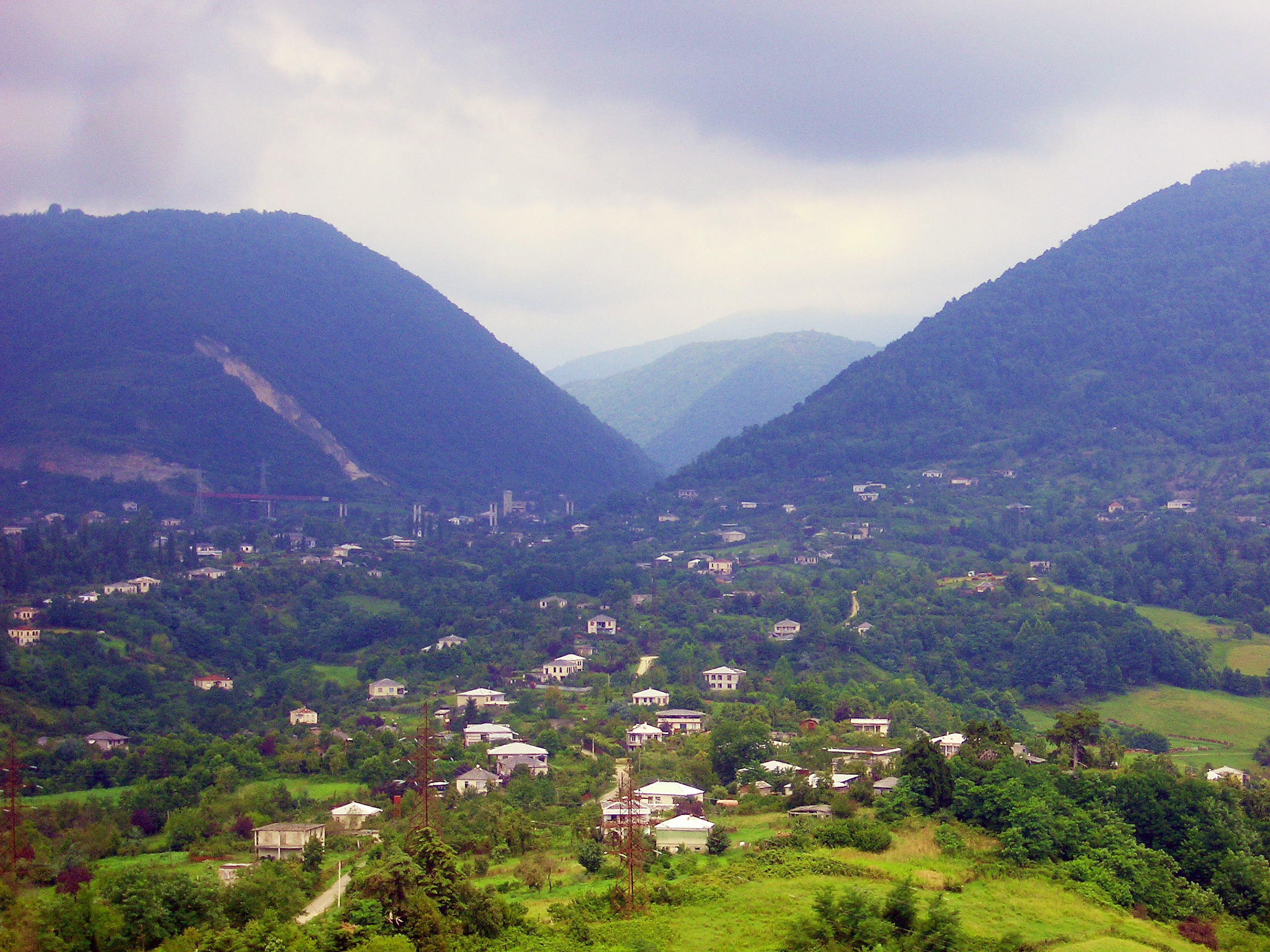
- Kamani in Georgia where the Kamani massacre took place in 1993
- Date: 30 January 1998
- Meeting no.: 3,851
- Code: S/RES/1150 (Document)
- Subject: The situation in Georgia
- Voting summary: 15 voted for; None voted against; None abstained
- Result: Adopted

Security Council composition
- Permanent members: China; France; Russia; United Kingdom; United States
- Non-permanent members: Bahrain; Brazil; Costa Rica; Gabon; Gambia; Japan; Kenya; Portugal; Slovenia; Sweden

United Nations Security Council resolution 1150, adopted unanimously on 30 January 1998, after reaffirming all resolutions on Georgia, particularly Resolution 1124 (1997), the Council extended the mandate of the United Nations Observer Mission in Georgia (UNOMIG) until 31 July 1998.

Both Georgia and Abkhazia welcomed the Secretary-General Kofi Annan's proposal to strengthen the involvement of the United Nations in the peace process and a plan for its implementation. Additionally, human rights had to be respected by both parties. Meanwhile, there was concern at the situation in the Gali region due to the laying of land mines, crime, kidnapping, murder and armed groups, which disrupted the peace process and return of refugees.

The Security Council noted with satisfaction that much of the groundwork for the peace process was completed, but important aspects to the conflict in Abkhazia were yet to be resolved. Direct dialogue between the parties was called for, and the unacceptability of demographic changes resulting from the conflict and safe return of refugees was also emphasised. The activities of armed groups and the laying of mines in the Gali region were condemned in the resolution, which also called for protection for UNOMIG personnel and the continuation of international humanitarian assistance.

== See also ==
- Georgian–Abkhazian conflict
- List of United Nations Security Council Resolutions 1101 to 1200 (1997–1998)
- United Nations resolutions on Abkhazia
