= United Nations Security Council Resolution 993 =

1995 United Nations Security Council resolution on Georgia

UN Security Council Resolution 993
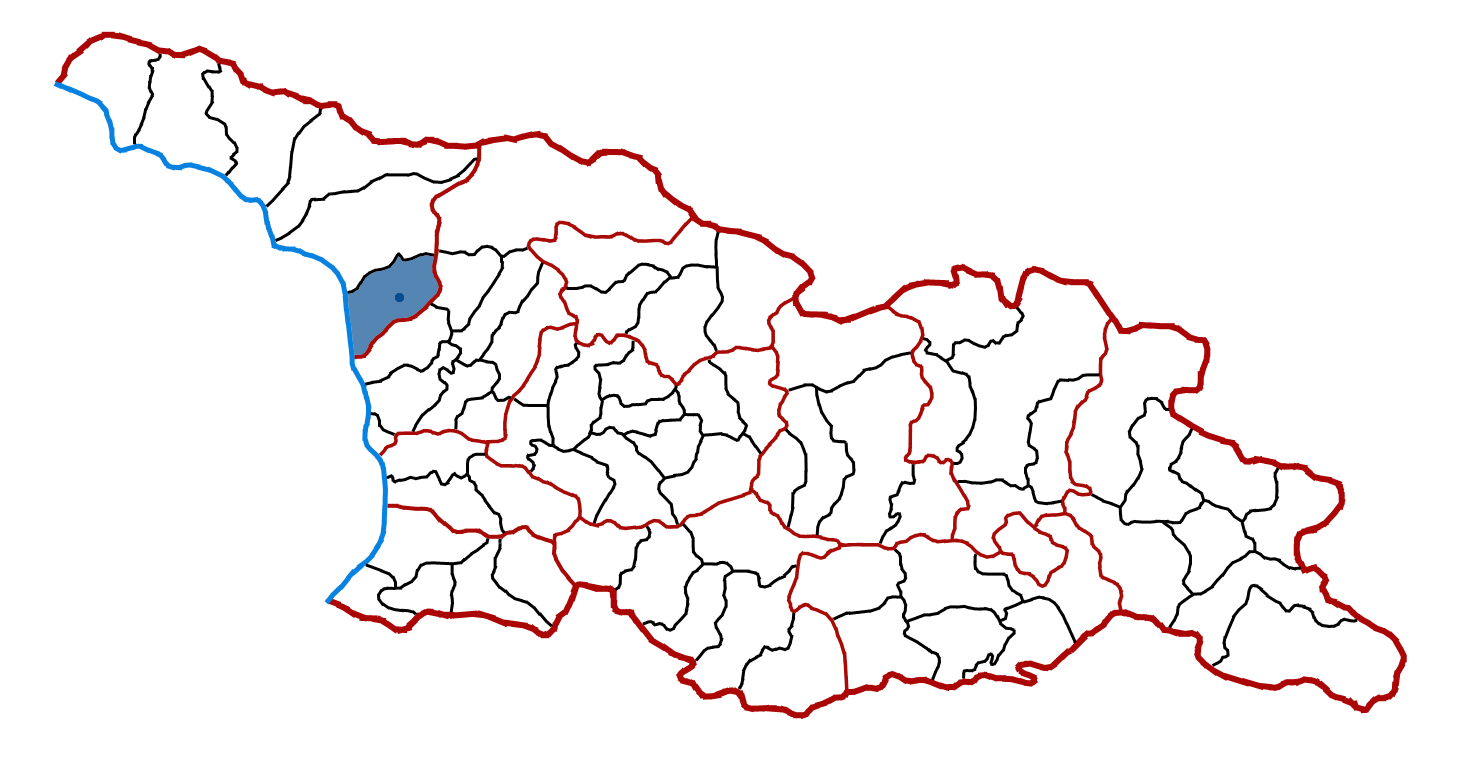
- Gali region (highlighted)
- Date: 12 May 1995
- Meeting no.: 3,535
- Code: S/RES/993 (Document)
- Subject: Abkhazia, Georgia
- Voting summary: 15 voted for; None voted against; None abstained
- Result: Adopted

Security Council composition
- Permanent members: China; France; Russia; United Kingdom; United States
- Non-permanent members: Argentina; Botswana; Czech Republic; Germany; Honduras; Indonesia; Italy; Nigeria; Oman; Rwanda

United Nations Security Council resolution 993, adopted unanimously on 12 May 1995, after reaffirming all resolutions on Georgia, particularly 971 (1995), the Council discussed efforts for a political settlement between Georgia and Abkhazia and extended the mandate of the United Nations Observer Mission in Georgia (UNOMIG) until 12 January 1996.

The security council felt that insufficient progress had been made towards a political agreement. Consultations regarding a new constitution for Georgia were welcomed. It was also reaffirmed that all refugees and displaced persons had the right to return, deploring the decision of the Abkhaz authorities for the obstruction of this process. The return of the refugees to the Gali there would be a welcome first step. Both parties were urged to comply with international humanitarian law. Furthermore, it was recognised that humanitarian aid programmes were suffering from funding shortages. There had been a ceasefire which was generally observed though there were still attacks on civilians in the Gali region.

After extending the mandate of UNOMIG until 12 January 1996, the council the parties to the conflict were called upon to make progress with the negotiations. Meanwhile, the Abkhaz authorities had to ensure the accelerated voluntary return of refugees. Additional measures taken by UNOMIG and the peacekeeping force from the Commonwealth of Independent States (CIS) in the Gali region were welcomed by the council. The Secretary-General Boutros Boutros-Ghali was asked to consider ways of improving respect for human rights in the region.

All countries were urged to contribute funds towards the fund for humanitarian relief efforts and implementation of agreements, particularly on demining. Every three months, the Secretary-General was required to report to the council on the situation in Georgia and Abkhazia and UNOMIG operations.

== See also ==
- Georgian–Abkhazian conflict
- List of United Nations Security Council Resolutions 901 to 1000 (1994–1995)
- United Nations resolutions on Abkhazia
- War in Abkhazia (1992–1993)
