= United Nations Security Council Resolution 1255 =

UN Security Council Resolution 1255
- Flag of Abkhazia
- Date: 30 July 1999
- Meeting no.: 4,029
- Code: S/RES/1255 (Document)
- Subject: The situation in Georgia
- Voting summary: 15 voted for; None voted against; None abstained
- Result: Adopted

Security Council composition
- Permanent members: China; France; Russia; United Kingdom; United States
- Non-permanent members: Argentina; Bahrain; Brazil; Canada; Gabon; Gambia; Malaysia; Namibia; Netherlands; Slovenia

United Nations Security Council resolution 1255, adopted unanimously on 30 July 1999, after reaffirming all resolutions on Georgia, particularly Resolution 1225 (1999), the council extended the mandate of the United Nations Observer Mission in Georgia (UNOMIG) until 31 January 2000.

The security council emphasised the unacceptability of the lack of progress with issues relating to the Abkhazia conflict and the situation in the conflict zone remained fragile. It was also important that both parties respected human rights as part of an overall political settlement.

The resolution demanded that both parties deepen their commitment towards the peace process, maintain high-level dialogue and strictly observe the 1994 Agreement on a Cease-fire and Separation of Forces. It underlined the importance of an early settlement of the political status of Abkhazia within Georgia. The council also regarded elections held in Abkhazia to be illegitimate and unacceptable.

Meanwhile, there was concern about the situation regarding refugees and demographic changes as a result of the conflict, therefore the return of refugees was necessary as a first step. On 16–18 October 1998 and 7–9 June 1999 there were agreements aimed at improving security and building confidence in the region, which was welcomed by the Security Council. The activities of armed groups in the Gali region were condemned. Finally, the Secretary-General Kofi Annan was requested to report within three months on the implementation of the current resolution, where a review of UNOMIG's mandate would take place.

== See also ==
- Georgian–Abkhazian conflict
- List of United Nations Security Council Resolutions 1201 to 1300 (1998–2000)
- United Nations resolutions on Abkhazia
