= United Nations Security Council Resolution 1036 =

1996 United Nations Security Council resolution on Georgia

UN Security Council Resolution 1036
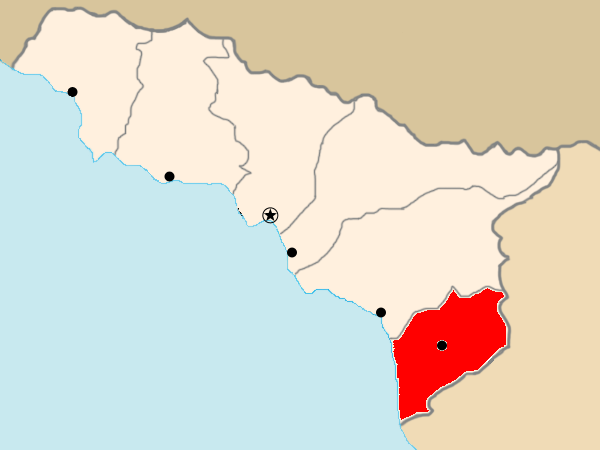
- Gali district in Abkhazia
- Date: 12 January 1996
- Meeting no.: 3,618
- Code: S/RES/1036 (Document)
- Subject: The situation in Georgia
- Voting summary: 15 voted for; None voted against; None abstained
- Result: Adopted

Security Council composition
- Permanent members: China; France; Russia; United Kingdom; United States
- Non-permanent members: Botswana; Chile; Egypt; Guinea-Bissau; Germany; Honduras; Indonesia; Italy; South Korea; Poland

United Nations Security Council resolution 1036, adopted unanimously on 12 January 1996, after reaffirming all resolutions on Georgia, particularly 993 (1995), the Council discussed efforts for a political settlement between Georgia and Abkhazia and extended the mandate of the United Nations Observer Mission in Georgia (UNOMIG) for another six months until 12 July 1996.

In November 1995, presidential elections were held in Georgia and the Council hoped they would contribute to an agreement on the conflict in Abkhazia. It also reaffirmed the right of all refugees to return the region, which was being obstructed by Abkhaz authorities. The humanitarian situation had deteriorated, especially in the Gali region, and there were concerns about violence and killings in that region. Co-operation between UNOMIG and the Commonwealth of Independent States (CIS) peacekeeping forces was welcomed, and the Agreement on a Cease-fire and Separation of Forces was being respected.

The Security Council was concerned that talks on an overall agreement were being delayed. Encouraging further efforts from the Organization for Security and Co-operation in Europe (OSCE), the Council demanded that the Abkhaz side make progress in the talks and allow the safe return of refugees and displaced persons. Furthermore, ethnic killings and human rights violations in Abkhazia were condemned.

Both parties were instructed to improve co-operation with UNOMIG and CIS peacekeeping forces especially in regard to inspections of heavy weapon sites, and the Secretary-General Boutros Boutros-Ghali was requested to report after three months on the situation in the region.

== See also ==
- Georgian–Abkhazian conflict
- List of United Nations Security Council Resolutions 1001 to 1100 (1995–1997)
- United Nations resolutions on Abkhazia
- War in Abkhazia (1992–1993)
