= United Nations Security Council Resolution 1124 =

UN Security Council Resolution 1124
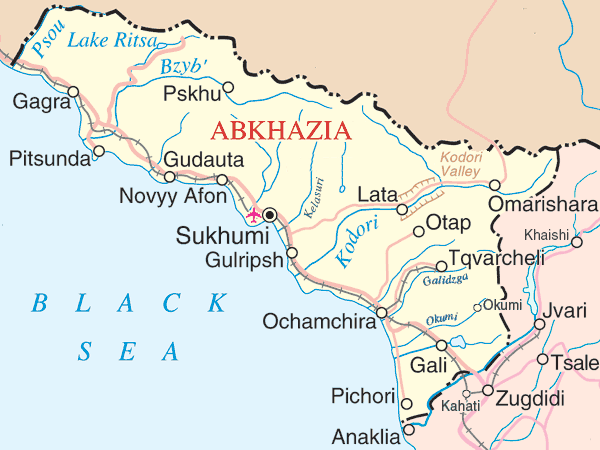
- Abkhazia
- Date: 31 July 1997
- Meeting no.: 3,807
- Code: S/RES/1124 (Document)
- Subject: The situation in Georgia
- Voting summary: 15 voted for; None voted against; None abstained
- Result: Adopted

Security Council composition
- Permanent members: China; France; Russia; United Kingdom; United States
- Non-permanent members: Chile; Costa Rica; Egypt; Guinea-Bissau; Japan; Kenya; South Korea; Poland; Portugal; Sweden

United Nations Security Council resolution 1124, adopted unanimously on 31 July 1997, after reaffirming all resolutions on Georgia, particularly Resolution 1096 (1997), the Council extended the mandate of the United Nations Observer Mission in Georgia (UNOMIG) until 31 January 1998.

The Security Council noted that UNOMIG observers and the peacekeeping force from the Commonwealth of Independent States (CIS) had stabilised the conflict zone in Georgia. However, the Gali region had been destabilised by armed groups, crime and the laying of land mines. Both Georgia and Abkhazia were reminded that assistance from the international community depended on their willingness to resolve the issue peacefully.

There was concern that was still a deadlock in negotiations between the two parties. The Council supported the plans of the Secretary-General Kofi Annan to play a more active role in the peace process; there was a meeting scheduled to be held in Geneva to determine areas in which concrete progress could be made. All ethnic killings and violence were condemned, in addition to the Abkhaz side linking the return of refugees and displaced persons to its political status. In this regard, Abkhazia was asked to accelerate the voluntary return of those displaced, under a timetable proposed by the United Nations High Commissioner for Refugees in accordance with international law.

The mandate of the UNOMIG mission was extended until 31 January 1998 but was dependent on developments relating to the CIS peacekeeping force. The Secretary-General to report on the situation in Abkhazia and Georgia three months after adoption of the current resolution. The resolution concluded with the Security Council announcing its intention to undertake a review of the UNOMIG mandate and its presence in Georgia.

== See also ==
- Georgian–Abkhazian conflict
- List of United Nations Security Council Resolutions 1101 to 1200 (1997–1998)
- United Nations resolutions on Abkhazia
