= United Nations Security Council Resolution 892 =

1993 United Nations Security Council resolution on Georgia

UN Security Council Resolution 892
- Flag of Abkhazia
- Date: 22 December 1993
- Meeting no.: 3,325
- Code: S/RES/892 (Document)
- Subject: Abkhazia, Georgia
- Voting summary: 15 voted for; None voted against; None abstained
- Result: Adopted

Security Council composition
- Permanent members: China; France; Russia; United Kingdom; United States
- Non-permanent members: Brazil; Cape Verde; Djibouti; Hungary; Japan; Morocco; New Zealand; Pakistan; Spain; Venezuela

United Nations Security Council resolution 892, adopted unanimously on 22 December 1993, after reaffirming resolutions 849 (1993), 854 (1993), 858 (1993), 876 (1993) and 881 (1993) on the Georgian–Abkhazian war and Resolution 868 (1993) concerning the safety of United Nations peacekeepers, the council discussed the phased deployment of 50 military observers in Georgia.

The council welcomed the memorandum of understanding between Georgia and Abkhazia, stating that the increased international presence in the zone of conflict would help ensure peace. The council also took note of talks held in Moscow and the intention to re-enter negotiations in Geneva on 11 January 1994 to resolve the conflict. Progress was being made in the talks and this justified the deployment of additional United Nations military observers. However at the same time concern was expressed at the humanitarian situation in Georgia and at the number of displaced persons and refugees.

After approving the phased deployment of 50 military observers, the intention of the Secretary-General Boutros Boutros-Ghali to send more observers in case the situation improved was noted. The council would review the mandate of the United Nations Observer Mission in Georgia (UNOMIG) based on the progress of the negotiations. In this regard, the parties were urged to abide by their commitments in the memorandum of understanding and ceasefire agreement and ensure the safety of UNOMIG personnel, welcoming Russia's assistance in this area.

The resolution concluded by urging the return of refugees and the provision of humanitarian aid to the civilian population, while donor countries were asked to make contributions to the United Nations humanitarian appeal.

== See also ==
- Abkhaz–Georgian conflict
- List of United Nations Security Council Resolutions 801 to 900 (1993–1994)
- United Nations resolutions on Abkhazia
- War in Abkhazia (1992–1993)
