= United Nations Security Council Resolution 881 =

United Nations Security Council resolution

UN Security Council Resolution 881
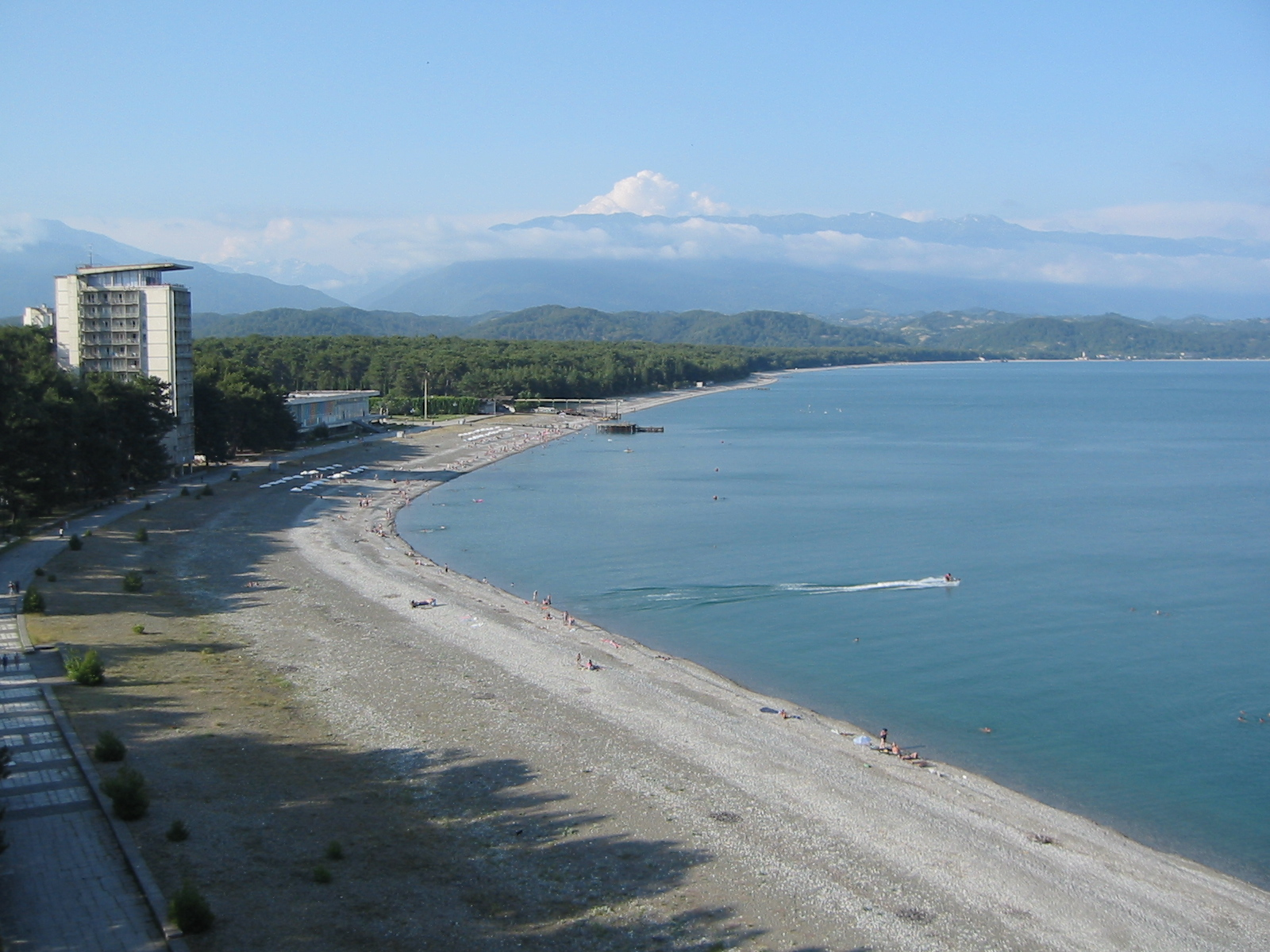
- Resort town of Pitsunda in Abkhazia
- Date: 4 November 1993
- Meeting no.: 3,304
- Code: S/RES/881 (Document)
- Subject: Abkhazia, Georgia
- Voting summary: 15 voted for; None voted against; None abstained
- Result: Adopted

Security Council composition
- Permanent members: China; France; Russia; United Kingdom; United States
- Non-permanent members: Brazil; Cape Verde; Djibouti; Hungary; Japan; Morocco; New Zealand; Pakistan; Spain; Venezuela

United Nations Security Council resolution 881, adopted unanimously on 4 November 1993, after reaffirming resolutions 849 (1993), 854 (1993), 858 (1993) and 876 (1993) concerning the Georgian–Abkhazian war, the Council extended the mandate of the United Nations Observer Mission in Georgia (UNOMIG) until 31 January 1994.

The Council expressed its concern at the continuing hostilities between Abkhazia and Georgia which threatened the peace and stability in the region, and welcomed the continued efforts of the Secretary-General Boutros Boutros-Ghali, his Special Envoy, Chairman-in-Office of the Organization for Security and Co-operation in Europe (OSCE) and the Government of Russia in the peace process with the aim of bringing both parties together in late November 1993 in Geneva, Switzerland.

The demands to both parties to refrain from the use of force and from any violations of international humanitarian law were reiterated, with the Council anticipating the results of the fact-finding mission sent by the Boutros-Ghali. After approving the continued presence of UNOMIG consisting of up to five military observers and support staff, with the following mandate:

(a) to maintain contacts with Abkhazia, Georgia and Russian military contingents;
(b) to monitor the situation and report on developments relating to efforts of the United Nations to promote a political settlement.

UNOMIG would not be extended beyond 31 January 1994, unless the Secretary-General reported that progress had been made or that the peace process would be served by the prolongation of its mandate. Finally, the Secretary-General was requested to take steps to enable the deployment of additional personnel within the originally authorised strength of UNOMIG if the situation on the ground allowed it.

== See also ==
- Abkhaz–Georgian conflict
- List of United Nations Security Council Resolutions 801 to 900 (1993–1994)
- United Nations resolutions on Abkhazia
- War in Abkhazia (1992–1993)
