= United Nations Security Council Resolution 876 =

UN Security Council Resolution 876
- 1992–1993 conflict map
- Date: 19 October 1993
- Meeting no.: 3,295
- Code: S/RES/876 (Document)
- Subject: Abkhazia, Georgia
- Voting summary: 15 voted for; None voted against; None abstained
- Result: Adopted

Security Council composition
- Permanent members: China; France; Russia; United Kingdom; United States
- Non-permanent members: Brazil; Cape Verde; Djibouti; Hungary; Japan; Morocco; New Zealand; Pakistan; Spain; Venezuela

United Nations Security Council resolution 876, adopted unanimously on 19 October 1993, after reaffirming resolutions 849 (1993), 854 (1993) and 858 (1993) concerning the Georgian–Abkhazian war, the council determined that the situation continued to constitute a threat to international peace and security.

Concern was expressed at violations of international humanitarian law and ethnic cleansing in the region, while affirming the sovereignty and territorial integrity of Georgia. The council also condemned the violation of the ceasefire agreement of 27 July 1993, by Abkhazia and subsequent actions in violation of international humanitarian law. The killing of the chairman of the Defence Council and Council of Ministers of the Autonomous Republic of Abkhazia was also condemned.

Both parties to the conflict were asked to refrain from the use of force and violating international humanitarian law, while the recommendation of the Secretary-General Boutros Boutros-Ghali to dispatch a fact-finding mission to investigate ethnic cleansing in Georgia. The right of refugees and displaced persons to return to their homes was reaffirmed.

The council welcomed humanitarian assistance from international humanitarian agencies, urging member states to provide aid in this regard and calling for unimpeded access for humanitarian workers. At the same time, Member States were urged not to provide any form of assistance to the Abkhaz side, other than humanitarian assistance, in particular preventing weapons from being supplied.

Resolution 876 concluded by praising the efforts of the secretary-general and his special envoy, the Chairman-in-Office of the Organization for Security and Co-operation in Europe and the Government of Russia. It welcomed the secretary-general's intention to provide a report on developments relating to the United Nations Observer Mission in Georgia and ending the conflict.

== See also ==
- Abkhaz–Georgian conflict
- List of United Nations Security Council Resolutions 801 to 900 (1993–1994)
- Sukhumi massacre
- United Nations resolutions on Abkhazia
- War in Abkhazia (1992–1993)
