= Territorial integrity =

Principle of international law

Territorial integrity is the principle under international law where sovereign states have a right to defend their borders and all territory in them from another state. It is enshrined in Article 2(4) of the UN Charter and has been recognized as customary international law. Under this principle, forcible imposition of a border change is an act of aggression.

In the post-World War years, there has been tension between this principle and the concept of humanitarian intervention under Article 73.b of the United Nations Charter "to develop self-government, to take due account of the political aspirations of the peoples, and to assist them in the progressive development of their free political institutions, according to the particular circumstances of each territory and its peoples and their varying stages of advancement."

Some of the strongest safeguards of territorial integrity are rule of law such as Charter of the United Nations and nuclear deterrence. Scholars have also evaluated whether a self-enforcing norm of mutual self-restraint regarding territorial revisions has emerged to prevent opening a "Pandora's box" of territorial claims and conflicts.

Scholars have debated the existence of a territorial integrity norm since the end of World War II. Conquest of large swaths of territory has been rare, but states have since 1945 continued to pursue (and often successfully) the violent annexation of small swaths of territory.

== History ==
Prior to the modern era, there was not a clearly defined system of international boundaries. Rather, authority over territorial spaces was non-linear, often overlapping and shifting. According to Mark Zacher, "precisely surveyed national borders only came into clear view in the eighteenth century." Guntram Herb dates the emergence of clearly defined political territories to the fifteenth century.

The Peace of Westphalia in 1648 is commonly considered to have established territorial integrity as a cornerstone of sovereignty, embodied in the concept of Westphalian sovereignty, but even this did not necessarily reflect any absolute right to particular territory. Even after Westphalia, territorial exchange remained common between states. In turn, these states were culturally diverse and politically disorganized, and people were not collectively identified by state borders.

The emergence of nationalism and self-determination in the 18th and 19th centuries began to alter people's perception of the states in which they resided. Nationalism promoted the belief that territory belonged to a nation and that the territorial integrity of a nation should be respected. Guntram Herb argues national identity is "dependent on territory because only territory provides tangible evidence of the nation's existence and its historical roots, and a nation needs a clearly demarcated national territory to demand its own state." John Etherington agrees, stating: "Underlying all nationalist claims over territory is the proposition that nation and territory ultimately belong to each other, to the extent that the characteristic features of each cannot be understood without making reference to the other." He observes how, because all nationalist movements necessarily make territorial claims in a world marked by competing claims over territory, this becomes an essential part of their self-justification.

Following World War I, the establishment of the League of Nations ushered in a new era of international cooperation. The League's Covenant codified territorial integrity as a key principle of international law. However, the political conditions for maintaining the territorial status quo after the war were not always maintained and various post-war settlements involved exchanges of territory irrespective of local populations.

With the formation of the United Nations (UN) and, later, such organizations as the Conference on Security and Cooperation in Europe (now Organization for Security and Co-operation in Europe), territorial integrity became a well-established part of international resolutions. The UN Charter of 1945 affirmed states’ obligation not to use force to alter state boundaries. Enforcement difficulties in the twenty-first century have led to controversy on possible re-emergence of the right of conquest as international law.

== In a changing world ==
The recent (post-World War II) strict application of territorial integrity has given rise to a number of problems and, when faced with reality "on the ground," can be seen as too artificial a construct.

Military situation of Abkhazia, South Ossetia and Nagorno-Karabakh between 2008 and 2023

At the 2005 World Summit, the world's nations agreed on a "Responsibility to Protect," allowing a right for humanitarian intervention. It has been argued that this could create a flexible application of concepts of sovereignty and territorial integrity, easing the strict adherence and taking into account the de facto status of the territory and other factors present on a case by case basis. The United Nations Security Council Resolution 1674, adopted by the United Nations Security Council on April 28, 2006, "Reaffirm[ed] the provisions of paragraphs 138 and 139 of the 2005 World Summit Outcome Document regarding the responsibility to protect populations from genocide, war crimes, ethnic cleansing and crimes against humanity."

However, this responsibility to protect refers only to the ability of external powers to override sovereignty and does not explicitly involve the changing of borders.

The International Court of Justice advisory opinion on Kosovo's declaration of independence claims that territorial integrity is not violated as far as international law is concerned by declarations of independence in themselves.

Writing on the cross-border institutions created in Northern Ireland following the Good Friday Agreement, Cathal McCall observes how these configurations constituted a "functional transterritorial model of governance for Northern Ireland based on the principles of interdependence, inclusion and consent" as opposed to the previous "exclusivist territorial political pillars of modern Irish nationalism and Ulster unionism." That is, the exclusivist assumptions of territorial integrity, embodied in Irish nationalism and Ulster unionism were blurred by the Agreement's implementation of cross-border decision-making.

== See also ==
- Breakaway states
- Crime of aggression
- Secession
- Self-determination
- 1974 Turkish invasion of Cyprus
- Russo-Ukrainian War
- Turkish occupation of northern Syria
- Israeli-occupied territories
- Falklands War
- Uti possidetis
- Indigenous rights
