= United Nations Security Council Resolution 854 =

UN Security Council Resolution 854
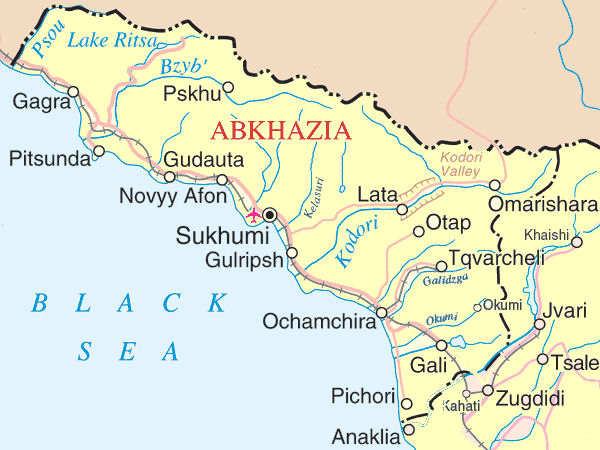
- Abkhazia
- Date: 6 August 1993
- Meeting no.: 3,261
- Code: S/RES/854 (Document)
- Subject: Abkhazia, Georgia
- Voting summary: 15 voted for; None voted against; None abstained
- Result: Adopted

Security Council composition
- Permanent members: China; France; Russia; United Kingdom; United States
- Non-permanent members: Brazil; Cape Verde; Djibouti; Hungary; Japan; Morocco; New Zealand; Pakistan; Spain; Venezuela

United Nations Security Council resolution 854, adopted unanimously on 6 August 1993, after recalling Resolution 849 (1993) which concerned a deployment of military observers if a ceasefire was observed between Abkhazia and Georgia, the Council noted that a ceasefire had been signed and approved a dispatch of 10 military observers to the area to observe the implementation of the ceasefire.

The mandate of the team of military observers would expire after three months, with the Council contemplating that the advance team would be incorporated into a United Nations observer mission if such a mission is established. A report by the Secretary-General Boutros Boutros-Ghali was anticipated on the proposed establishment of an observer mission, including its financial costs and a time-frame and projected conclusion for the operation. The United Nations Observer Mission in Georgia was established in Resolution 858.

== See also ==
- Abkhaz–Georgian conflict
- List of United Nations Security Council Resolutions 801 to 900 (1993–1994)
- Sukhumi massacre
- United Nations resolutions on Abkhazia
- War in Abkhazia (1992–1993)
