= United Nations Security Council Resolution 858 =

UN Security Council Resolution 858
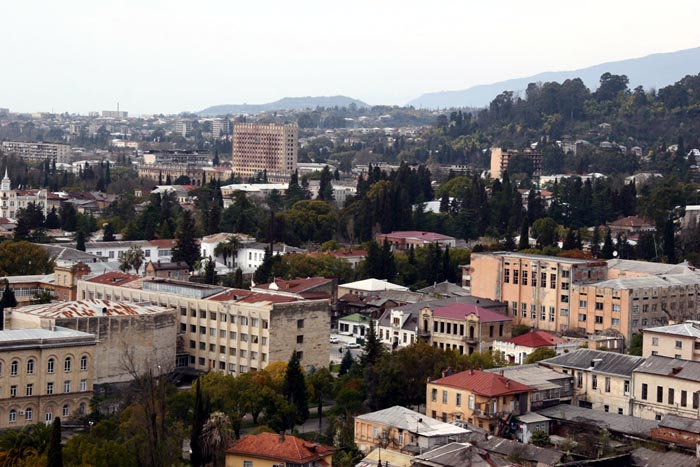
- Sukhumi, Abkhazia
- Date: 24 August 1993
- Meeting no.: 3,268
- Code: S/RES/858 (Document)
- Subject: Abkhazia, Georgia
- Voting summary: 15 voted for; None voted against; None abstained
- Result: Adopted

Security Council composition
- Permanent members: China; France; Russia; United Kingdom; United States
- Non-permanent members: Brazil; Cape Verde; Djibouti; Hungary; Japan; Morocco; New Zealand; Pakistan; Spain; Venezuela

United Nations Security Council resolution 858, adopted unanimously on 24 August 1993, after recalling resolutions 849 (1993) and 854 (1993) and noting a ceasefire between Abkhazia and Georgia and commitments to withdraw forces, the council established the United Nations Observer Mission in Georgia (UNOMIG) for an initial period of 90 days pending further extension.

In accordance with a report by the Secretary-General Boutros Boutros-Ghali, the peacekeeping force would consist of 88 military observers plus staff necessary to support UNOMIG. It would observe the ceasefire and report violations of it to the secretary-general, paying close attention to the city of Sukhumi and attempt to resolve any violations with the parties involved.

UNOMIG would be established for an initial period of 90 days which would be extended to six months based on whether progress had been made in implementing peace measures. Meanwhile, the secretary-general was requested to report back within three months on developments. The proposed deployment of mixed interim monitoring groups of Georgian/Abkhaz/Russian units was welcomed, calling on all concerned to pursue negotiations to ensure a comprehensive political settlement of the conflict.

== See also ==
- Georgian–Abkhazian conflict
- List of United Nations Security Council Resolutions 801 to 900 (1993–1994)
- Sukhumi massacre
- United Nations resolutions on Abkhazia
- War in Abkhazia (1992–1993)
