= United Nations Security Council Resolution 849 =

1993 United Nations Security Council resolution on Georgia

UN Security Council Resolution 849
- Abkhazia and Georgia
- Date: 9 July 1993
- Meeting no.: 3,252
- Code: S/RES/849 (Document)
- Subject: Abkhazia, Georgia
- Voting summary: 15 voted for; None voted against; None abstained
- Result: Adopted

Security Council composition
- Permanent members: China; France; Russia; United Kingdom; United States
- Non-permanent members: Brazil; Cape Verde; Djibouti; Hungary; Japan; Morocco; New Zealand; Pakistan; Spain; Venezuela

United Nations Security Council resolution 849, adopted unanimously on 9 July 1993, after noting with concern the recent fighting around Sukhumi in the disputed region of Abkhazia, the Council requested the Secretary-General Boutros Boutros-Ghali to send his Special Envoy to the region in order to reach agreement for a ceasefire between Abkhazia and Georgia, and once implemented, authorised a dispatch of 50 military observers. It was the first Security Council resolution on the conflict.

The Secretary-General was also requested to make recommendations on the mandate of the military observers, while his efforts to launch a peace process involving Abkhazia, Georgia along with Russia as a facilitator and continuing co-operation with the Chairman-in-Office of the Organization for Security and Co-operation in Europe were supported. Finally, the Government of Georgia was requested to enter into discussions with the United Nations on a Status of Forces Agreement to facilitate early deployment of observers.

== See also ==
- Georgian–Abkhazian conflict
- List of United Nations Security Council Resolutions 801 to 900 (1993–1994)
- Sukhumi massacre
- United Nations Observer Mission in Georgia
- United Nations resolutions on Abkhazia
- War in Abkhazia (1992–1993)
