= Agreement on a Cease-fire and Separation of Forces =

1994 ceasefire agreement after the War in Abkhazia

The Agreement on a Cease-fire and Separation of Forces was signed by parties to the Georgian-Abkhazian conflict in Moscow on 14 May 1994. Also known as the 1994 Moscow Agreement, it was witnessed by United Nations, Russian Federation and Conference on Security and Cooperation in Europe representatives. The agreement was recognised in United Nations Security Council Resolution 934.

Georgia and Abkhazia agreed to a cease fire and the creation of a security zone clear of heavy weapons separating the parties. A peacekeeping force of the Commonwealth of Independent States would monitor compliance of the agreement, with the assistance of the United Nations Observer Mission in Georgia (UNOMIG).

== See also ==
- War in Abkhazia (1992–1993)
- Sochi agreement
