= Kodori =

Kodori or Kodor may refer to one of the following entities:

- Kodori (Latvia), a village in Latvia
- Kodori (river), the second largest river of Abkhazia
- Kodori Valley, the valley through which the river Kodori flows
  - 2001 Kodori crisis, a confrontation in the Lower Kodori Valley between Chechen and Georgian guerrilas on the one hand and Abkhazians on the other
  - 2006 Kodori crisis, a confrontation in the Upper Kodori Valley between Georgian troops and the local Monadire militia led by warlord Emzar Kvitsiani
  - Battle of the Kodori Valley, a military operation of 2008 during the Russo-Georgian War
- Kodor, the Hungarian name for Codor village, Jichișu de Jos Commune, Cluj County, Romania

== Other meanings ==
- Vladimirovka (village), a village in eastern Abkhazia, called Kodori in the period 1943-1955
