= 2007 Georgia missile incident =

Missile landing near the Georgian-Ossetian conflict zone

The 2007 Georgia missile incident refers to the landing of a missile in the Georgian village of Tsitelubani in the Gori district near the Georgian-Ossetian conflict zone, some 65 km (40 mi) north-west of Tbilisi, the capital of Georgia, on 7 August 2007. Georgian officials said that two Russian combat aircraft violated its airspace and fired a missile, which fell on the edge of a village but did not explode. Russia denied this allegation and said that Georgia may have fired the missile on its own territory as a way of provoking tensions in the region. Several expert teams were sent to Georgia to investigate the incident. While two international investigation teams confirmed Georgia's claims, the Russian team dismissed them. The Organization for Security and Co-operation in Europe (OSCE) stated that it was "extremely difficult to have a clear picture", given the conflicting nature of the experts' findings. The organization decided not to launch its own probe into the incident. The Portuguese ambassador to the OSCE has issued a statement on behalf of the EU, which refrained from supporting either Georgian or Russian version of the events.

== Background ==
The missile incident occurred amids rising tensions between Georgia and Russia since the 2003 Rose Revolution, which brought Mikhail Saakashvili, a pro-western president to power. Among others, his wish for Georgia to join NATO and the EU, as well as seeking greater economic and military ties with the West, irked Russia as it marked a loss of Russian influence in the region. Since then, several crises, incidents and accusations have succeeded each other: the 2004 Adjara crisis, the 2006 North Ossetia sabotages, the 2006 Russian ban of Moldovan and Georgian wines, the 2006 Kodori crisis, the 2006 Georgian-Russian espionage controversy and the March 2007 Georgia helicopter attack incident.

== Incident ==
Vano Merabishvili, Georgia's interior minister, said that two Sukhoi attack aircraft entered Georgian airspace from Russia at 7.30 pm on 7 August and fired at least one air-to-surface missile at the village of Tsitelubani. The missile left a 16-foot crater in a field but failed to detonate. Sappers later defused the missile.

== Reactions and views ==
=== Georgia ===
Georgian experts have identified the missile as a Soviet-designed Kh-58 ARM. The remains of the missile were destroyed by the Georgian authorities before its identity could be confirmed by the Joint Control Commission. Georgian President Mikhail Saakashvili said the incident was part of a pattern of Russian aggression against its neighbors and urged European states to condemn Moscow. Georgia claimed to have radar evidence proving that the invading aircraft flew in from Russia and said that the strike had aimed, unsuccessfully, at destroying radar equipment recently installed near the South Ossetian conflict zone. The Georgian experts suggested the pilot did not fire but jettisoned the missile and fled after friendly forces of South Ossetia mistakenly fired an anti-aircraft missile at his jet.

Former President of Georgia Eduard Shevardnadze, said that during his time in office, Russian jets on a regular basis bombed Georgian forces during the wars in the 1990s when Abkhazia and South Ossetia broke from central government control. "I won't be revealing any great secrets if I say that that such violations of Georgia's air space and bombings were common during my presidency. But Russian forces never acknowledged any of this," Shevardnadze said.

The Georgian opposition politicians Salome Zourabichvili and Shalva Natelashvili suggested that the Georgian authorities might have been behind the incident, intended as a provocation.

On 22 August, after the conclusions of the two international and the Russian investigations (see below), Georgia's UN ambassador, Irakli Alasania, accused Russia of attempting to "intimidate Georgia and assess Georgian military readiness." He further added that Georgia had to "take an absolutely resolute and non-negotiable stance in the face of efforts to use military force to destabilize a democratic state, and to attempt to influence its domestic and foreign policy".

=== South Ossetia ===
South Ossetian President Eduard Kokoity described the incident as "a provocation staged by the Georgian side, aimed at discrediting Russia", claiming that another bomb fell in South Ossetia. In his words, "a Georgian military plane crossed into South Ossetia on Monday, performed manoeuvres above Ossetian villages and dropped two bombs." On 9 August 2007, South Ossetian President Eduard Kokoity announced that he intends to request that Russia deploys air-defense systems in the republic, to discourage any such future incidents.

=== Russia ===
Russia also denied the Georgian claim. Later that day, Russia's foreign ministry said that Georgian jets may have fired the missile on their own territory as a way of provoking tensions in the region and derailing a session of the Joint Control Commission on Georgian-South Ossetian Conflict Resolution. Georgia immediately denounced the claim as absurdity.

=== Other ===
The U.S. Deputy Assistant Secretary of State for European Affairs Matthew Bryza rejected the Russian allegations, advising Moscow to tone down its rhetoric on Georgia. European Commission spokeswoman Christiane Hohmann urged Georgia and Russia to show restraint and said it is not possible to further comment on the incident until the full facts are known. She added a team from the OSCE is looking into the affair. The OSCE has also appealed for both sides to show restraint.

Adrian Blomfield reported in The Daily Telegraph that some commentators suggested that a group of Kremlin hardliners were intent on provoking a military confrontation to provide an excuse to change the Russian constitution and allow Russian president Vladimir Putin to stay in power. Alexei Malashenko, an expert on the Caucasus at the Moscow Carnegie Centre, said it was possible that this faction had ordered the firing of a dummy missile in a bid to fuel the crisis. But he said it was more likely that the missile attack could have been carried out by local Russian army units without the knowledge of the Russian government.

Stratfor, a private intelligence agency based in the United States, speculates that "considering regional developments in the past few weeks, this "bomb" was far more likely a Georgian ploy than a Russian one. (And it is even more likely that it was accidentally dropped by an under-loved and under-maintained Georgian aircraft rather than deliberately targeted.)".

== Aftermath ==
=== OSCE report ===
According to the Georgian Ministry of Foreign Affairs and the Organization for Security and Co-operation in Europe (OSCE) spokeswoman in Vienna, the OSCE mission reported "one aircraft flying from north-east" though the report has not yet been publicly released. The spokeswoman stressed that it was "an internal report that does not represent the position of the OSCE". The Georgian state minister Davit Bakradze added that "there is no other country than Russia to the north-east."

On 17 August 2007, OSCE Chairman-in-Office, Spanish Foreign Minister Miguel Angel Moratinos, appointed Croatian diplomat and ex-minister Miomir Žužul, "to be his personal representative in a mission to Georgia on (a) missile incident that took place on 6 August," alleged to be a Russian missile strike on Georgian territory. Žužul will reportedly travel to Georgia and the Russian Federation early on the week of 20 August. He will reportedly be joined by the Chargé d'Affaires of the Spanish Permanent Mission to the OSCE, Arturo Perez Martinez.

On 30 August, the OSCE's chairman-in-office, Spanish Foreign Minister Miguel Angel Moratinos, met with Russian Foreign Minister Sergei Lavrov in Moscow. The ministers discussed among others the missile incident and Moratinos outlined the contents of the report prepared by his special envoy Žužul on meetings he had the week before in Moscow and Tbilisi. The report, which is not yet publicly available, will be presented by Žužul at the OSCE Permanent Council meeting in Vienna on 6 September. An OSCE spokesman said that "the key point here is that it's not the OSCE's role to pass judgment, or point the finger. It's to listen to all sides, and to recommend and seek ways to avoid similar incidents and tensions in the future. So this is not about trying to establish who was responsible, or what exactly happened, but to look to the future to try to find ways to ensure that this kind of thing does not happen again."

On 6 September 2007, a months after the incident, a closed-door OSCE Council session was held. Julie Finley, the US ambassador to the OSCE, dismissed the report of the Russian experts and called for the OSCE to launch its own investigation. This motion was not supported by Žužul; there will be no OSCE probe into the incident. Instead, the organization will focus on preventing similar incidents in the future, promptly intervening in the event of a crisis.

=== UN Security Council ===
The Georgian Ministry of Foreign Affairs tried to secure the holding of a UN Security Council session to discuss the incident and to encourage the international involvement into the investigation of the attack. Former Georgian president Shevardnadze dismissed efforts to involve the United Nations, as Russia would use its veto as a permanent member of the Security Council to thwart any real investigation or criticism.

On 16 August, the United States, which backed Georgia's call for a special session, attempted to have the Security Council issue a statement on the alleged incident. Russia, however, blocked the move, calling it "premature."

=== International investigation ===
On 15 August, the group of defense specialists from the United States, Sweden, Latvia, and Lithuania, involved in the international investigation at Georgia's request, released their findings in Tbilisi. The group confirmed that the plane flew from Russia into Georgian airspace and back three times and described the missile as a Russian-designed KH-58, which is intended to take out radar systems. The team added that Georgian Air Force "does not possess aircraft equipped with or able to launch" that missile.

A team of Russian investigators also arrived in Georgia on 16 August to conduct its own probe. Speaking at a news conference in Tbilisi, Russian ambassador Valery Kenyaikin said on 16 August that Moscow did not find the evidence of the international team convincing. He also said the Russian team presented evidence that refuted the team's findings, commenting that: "The documents handed to the Georgian side show – and I hope prove – the absence of any information or elements [of information] testifying to the violation of Georgian airspace by Russia." A Russian Air Force official also claimed that Georgian authorities presented the Russian investigators with parts of several different missiles, some of which had traces of rust on them.

An envoy appointed by the OSCE to investigate the incident met Georgian officials in Tbilisi, and traveled to Moscow.

A group of experts from Britain, Poland, and Estonia corroborated the results of the previous international investigation that a military jet illegally entered its airspace from Russia and dropped or jettisoned a missile before flying back to Russia.

== See also ==
- 2007 Abkhazia plane downing incident
