= Kvemo Azhara =

Kvemo Azhara ქვემო აჟარა
- Village
- Location of Kvemo Azhara in Georgia Kvemo Azhara (Abkhazia)
- Coordinates: 43°06′26.0″N 41°44′09.7″E
- Country: Georgia
- Partially recognized independent country: Abkhazia
- District: Gulripshi
- Elevation: 560 m (1,840 ft)

Population (2002)
  - Total: 48
- Time zone: UTC+4 (Georgian Time)

Kvemo Azhara (Georgian: ქვემო აჟარა) is a village in the upper part of the Kodori Valley, situated in Gulripshi District, Abkhazia, a breakaway region of Georgia.

== History ==
Prior to August 2008, Kvemo Azhara was part of 'Upper Abkhazia', the only part of Abkhazia controlled by the Georgian government. The village was home to the headquarters of Government of the Autonomous Republic of Abkhazia, recognized by Georgia as the only legitimate government of Abkhazia. The village and the surrounding area were undergoing a major rehabilitation program. During the August 2008 war in South Ossetia, Abkhazian forces gained control of Kvemo Azhara and the rest of Upper Abkhazia.

== See also ==
- 2007 Georgia helicopter incident
- Gulripshi District
