= 2008 Achamkhara incident =

Coordinates: 43.135721°N 41.072109°E

- Part of Georgian-Abkhazian conflict
Date	July 9, 2008
Location	Mount Achamkhara, Gulripshi District, Abkhazia
Result	Georgian victory: Aggravation of tensions

Belligerents
Abkhazian military	Georgian military

Strength
	~10 soldiers (Abkhazian claims)

Casualties and losses
2 wounded (Abkhazian claims); 4 dead (Georgian claims)	3 wounded (Georgian claims)

The 2008 Achamkhara incident refers to the armed confrontation, that took place on July 9, 2008, on the flanks of Mount Achamkhara in the internationally unrecognised Republic of Abkhazia, between Abkhazian and Georgian troops.

== Background ==
At the time of the incident, Mount Achamkhara was located near the de facto border between the self-declared Republic of Abkhazia and the formerly Georgian-controlled Kodori Gorge.

== The incident ==
The claims of both sides are different, with conflicting versions of the events and there isn't any independent confirmation, on what took place.

=== The Abkhazian view ===
Abkhazia claims, that at 9:25 a.m., its security post on Mount Achamkhara was raided by around 10 Georgian attackers, using automatic weapons and grenade launchers. Two of its reservists were injured and had to be hospitalised.

=== The Georgian view ===
Georgia claims, that its policemen were attacked by Abkhazian troops, while they were securing the Achamkhara heights in anticipation of a UNOMIG visit to the Kvabchara Valley. It further claims, that 3 of its police officers were injured and they in turn had killed 4 Abkhazian assailants.

== UNOMIG investigation ==
Both sides appealed to the UNOMIG, with the wish to investigate the incident, which was started on June 10. It hasn't revealed anything yet.
