= 2006 Georgian–Russian espionage controversy =

The 2006 Georgian–Russian espionage controversy began when the Government of Georgia arrested four Russian officers on charges of espionage, on September 27, 2006. The Western and Georgian media sources report that relations between the two post-Soviet nations have significantly deteriorated after Georgia and NATO agreed to hold talks on closer relations.

== Background ==
Russian-Georgian relations have largely been reported as tense after the November 2003 Rose Revolution in Georgia brought the pro-Western reformist leader Mikheil Saakashvili to power.

The 2006 gas pipeline explosions and the Russian ban of Georgian wines and mineral waters were interpreted by many as the means of the Government of Russia's pressure on the Georgian leadership for the country's close ties with NATO and the United States.

The recent disruption of the Status quo ante in the Kodori Valley in Abkhazia led to a further downturn in the already tensed Russian-Georgian relations.

In July 2006, the Georgian police and security forces took control of the Kodori Valley, hitherto controlled by the local Georgian militias led by the defiant commander Emzar Kvitsiani. Georgian officials claimed that the Russian security services were behind the 2006 Kodori crisis, while Russian and Abkhaz authorities accused Georgia of violation of the previous ceasefire agreements by deploying an armed force in the Valley. In September 2006, the area was officially renamed Upper Abkhazia by the Georgian government and declared to be the "temporary administrative center" of Abkhazia until the conflict is resolved.

Continuous anti-Russian statements by the Georgian government, such as the September 2006 speech by President Saakashvili in Poland, were interpreted by some Russian media sources as depicting Russia as the "barbarous tribe of Huns".

== Timeline ==
- On September 27 four Russian officers (allegedly working for Russian military intelligence, GRU) and at least ten Georgian citizens were detained on espionage charges in Tbilisi and other cities of Georgia.
- On September 28 Russia recalled Vyacheslav Kovalenko, its ambassador, and began a partial evacuation of its staff from the country.
- On September 29, Georgia charged the officers with spying and ordered them to be held for two months pending investigations. The Russian military headquarters in Tbilisi, Georgia, was encircled by Georgian police who were searching for an additional suspect allegedly involved in the February 2005 car bomb blast in the town of Gori, Georgia, which killed three Georgian police officers and destroyed a local police office.
- On September 29, Russia proposed a draft of a strict resolution condemning "provocations of Georgia" to the United Nations Security Council. The United States blocked the vote, however, on the account that the US delegation was "not satisfied with the document as it is", as the US Ambassador to the United Nations John Bolton put it.
- On September 29, 2006, President Putin met Sergey Bagapsh and Eduard Kokoity, the secessionist leaders of Abkhazia and South Ossetia, respectively, who were invited as foreign guests, at the roundtable discussions on "Economic Development of Southern Russia" hosted in Sochi, leading to protests from Georgia.
- On October 2, the arrested Russian officers were handed over by the Georgian side to the Chairman of the Organization for Security and Co-operation in Europe (OSCE), after being paraded in front of the international media in Tbilisi. OSCE Chairman-in-Office Karel De Gucht had arrived in Tbilisi for the negotiations with the Georgian government. The officers returned to Moscow on the same day.
- On October 3, Russia suspended air, rail, road, sea and postal links to Georgia, and stopped issuing entry visas to all Georgian citizens. The OSCE, UN, and the US called on Russia to match Georgia and take steps to decrease tension by reestablishing transport links with Georgia. However, Russia has rejected U.S. and EU calls to lift economic sanctions on Georgia.
- On October 3, Moscow police raided Georgian businesses in the capital of Russia, shut down a Georgian-owned casino and occupied a Georgian guest house. Although the Russian Interior Ministry described these moves as "routine, planned work... to combat ethnic organized crime groups," according to the Reuters agency, law enforcement officials had received oral instructions to step up action against Georgians.
- On October 4, the State Duma of the Russian Federation passed a resolution "on the anti-Russian and anti-democratic policies of the Georgian leadership," hinting at tougher retaliatory, though unspecified, moves in the future. These moves have largely been assessed by Georgia, Russian human rights organization the Moscow Helsinki Group, and several media sources as "Moscow's anti-Georgian campaign".
- On October 4, schools run by the Russian army in Georgia said they would no longer be admitting Georgian pupils. This was denied later by Russian officials.
- On October 5, in response to the sanctions, Georgia threatened to block Russia's bid to join the World Trade Organization (WTO).
- On October 6, Russia deported by plane at least 130 Georgians accused of "immigration offences", following the Russian crackdown on allegedly criminal businesses owned by Georgians and the tightening of visa criteria for Georgians. Vice-president of the Federal Migration Service of Russia, Mikhail Tyurkin, noted that illegal immigrants "head home, to their mothers and children" and termed the mission "humanitarian". Additionally, Moscow police has allegedly asked schools to form "lists of children with Georgian-sounding surnames" to allow for background checks on their parents, opening the road for further deportations. These allegations were denied by Valery Gribakin, the Moscow Police spokesman.
- On October 6, the State Duma, the lower house of the Parliament of Russia, ratified a treaty with Georgia on the timeframe and modalities of withdrawing Russian bases from Georgia, as well as an agreement with Georgia on military transit, which gives Russia access to its base in Gyumri, Armenia, via Georgia. Both agreements were signed by Georgia and Russia on March 31, 2006.

On April 16, 2009, the case was brought before the European Court of Human Rights. The hearing was for the admissibility of the State vs. State case, a rare occurrence in this court. On July 3, 2014, the ECHR ruled that Russia engaged in a systematic policy of arresting, detaining, and expelling Georgian nationals between September 2006 and January 2007, violating several articles of the European Convention on Human Rights.

== Reactions ==
On September 29, Sergey Ivanov, Russia's Defense Minister and Vice Premier, denounced Georgia as a "bandit" state, and accused the NATO members of arming Georgia in support to "military solution" to the country's secessionist conflicts. Vladimir Zhirinovsky, urged the government to exert economic and political pressure on Georgia, and consider military intervention.

On September 30, the BBC reported Foreign Minister of Georgia Gela Bezhuashvili as saying that Georgia "expected Russia to honour the pullout agreement" and as accusing the Russian government of "trying to scare" Georgians. President Mikheil Saakashvili described the Russian government's reaction to the arrests as "hysteria".

President Putin said, on October 1, Georgia's arrest of four Russian army officers for spying was "an act of state terrorism with hostage-taking", a statement that was downplayed by Saakashvili as "an overreaction caused by nervousness that they have created by themselves".

Meanwhile, various international organizations are trying to defuse the diplomatic conflict between the two sides. On September 30, the European Union foreign policy chief Javier Solana spoke by telephone with Mikheil Saakashvili, urging him to find a rapid solution and offering assistance. The Organization for Security and Cooperation in Europe (OSCE), to which both Georgia and Russia belong, appealed, on October 1, for both sides to open a dialogue and seek a peaceful solution to the dispute. The OSCE Chairman-in-Office Karel De Gucht said he was ready to travel to the region if needed and assist the conflicting sides to reduce the tensions.

On October 16, the Russian newspaper Versiya published an interview with the Georgian Defense Minister, Irakli Okruashvili where the minister stated that Russia "would lose if the quarrel between the two countries escalates into a shooting war". On the same day Yury Baluyevsky, the Chief of Staff of the Russian Armed Forces, responded that Russia does not plan a war with Georgia and warned about the "consequences of the provocation by the brash politician". The next day the Georgian Ministry of Defense denied that Defense Minister Irakli Okruashvili was interviewed by the Russian newspaper and called the information "another provocation coinciding with the visit of NATO officials to Moscow." Russian newspaper asserted that the interview it published was genuine and the audio recording of the conversation between the reporter Ruslan Gorevoy and Okruashvili is available.

On September 17, Estonia's parliament passed a declaration in support of "strengthening democracy in Georgia" and condemning "the endeavours by the Russian Federation to suppress Georgia's intentions by using economic sanctions and threats of [using] force."

== Deportations ==
The deportation of Georgian immigrants from Russia amid the ongoing diplomatic crisis also aroused much controversy. According to Russian authorities, more than half of the Georgians in the country are working illegally. Following the Russian crackdown on Georgian-owned alleged criminal businesses and the tightening of visa criteria for Georgians, on October 6, 2006, about 136 Georgians accused of "immigration offences" were flown back to Georgia on board a Russian cargo plane. Several deportees, however, showed valid passports and Russian entry visas, as reported by Reuters. In Georgia, the process of deportation and crackdown on allegedly illegal Georgian businesses in Moscow was described as “ethnic cleansing.”

Vice-president of the Federal Migration Service of Russia, Mikhail Tyurkin, said that immigrants "head home, to their mothers and children" and termed the mission "humanitarian".

The Russian authorities are also claimed to have begun targeting ethnic Georgian celebrities living in Moscow, including the famed Georgian-Russian fiction novelist Grigory Chkhartishvili better known by his penname Boris Akunin. Akunin commented on the Russian radio station Echo of Moscow that his publisher had been questioned by tax authorities over the writer's finances. "I didn't think I would live to see ethnic cleansing in Russia," he said. On October 6, the influential Russian human rights organization, Memorial condemned both sides of the dispute, accusing the government of Russia of "racial discrimination", and Georgia of "irresponsible policies".

Mikhail Kasyanov, leader of Russia's Peoples Democratic Union and former Prime Minister of Russia, made a following statement:

The actions of the Russian leadership, which called upon the UN Security Council for the resolution of an incident that occurred in relation to Georgia and which made the decision to implement informal sanctions against the Georgian people, are unworthy of the status of a Great Power. This policy can not be justified by the incorrect, and at times provocative, actions of the Georgian leadership. The ongoing campaign of discrimination not only against the people of the neighboring state, but also against [Russian] citizens of Georgian nationality, have led to the violation of the Constitution, which directly forbids the limitation of citizens' rights based on ethnicity. We have to admit that Russia's first presidency in the G-8 would be marked not only by gas scandals, but also by chauvinist hysteria.

On October 6, the Moscow-based Echo of Moscow radio station called for expressing a protest against the authorities’ policy towards ethnic Georgian immigrants through pinning a badge saying "I am Georgian":

Political standoff between Russia and Georgia has turned into tracking down Georgians living in Russia. They live with us and they should not be blamed if officials, politicians and the Presidents of the two countries hate each other... If you do not want large-scale ethnic cleansing to be launched in Russia... pin this badge before coming out in the street.”

On October 7, a minor unsanctioned rally organized by opposition youth activists in support of the Georgians was dispersed and more than a dozen of its participants detained by Moscow police.

== Background information ==
- Around 1,000,000 Georgians reside in Russia as foreign workers.
- According to the 2002 All-Russia Population Census, 197,934 Georgians have Russian citizenship.
- According to the director of Russian Migration Service, annual remittances (monetary transfers) of Georgian foreign workers from Russia to Georgia constitute 20% of Georgia's GDP — over 1 billion dollars a year.
- Russia is one of the most important Georgian trade partners, responsible for around 15% of total Georgian foreign trade.
- The Georgian share of Russian foreign trade makes up 0.5%.
- Russia's role in the Georgian-Abkhaz conflict, siding with the Abkhaz separatists, has been a cause for resentment in Georgia. The conflict resulted in the ethnic cleansing of Georgians from the province of Abkhazia, with the death of an estimated 20,000 to 30,000 Georgians and the displacement of over 250,000 Georgian refugees, who had to be redistributed throughout Georgia, which has a population of only 4 million people. Weakened by the war, Georgia was forced to join the Commonwealth of Independent States and remain under the political influence of Russia.
- Russia still maintains two Russian military bases in Georgia (the 62nd Base in Akhalkalaki and the 12th in Batumi), remnants of the Soviet era, but the bases are in the process of being withdrawn. The process is scheduled to finish in 2007 for the Akhalkalaki base and in 2008 for the Batumi base. The headquarters of the Russian military forces in the Caucasus is located in Tbilisi. Due to the espionage conflict, the headquarters was closed down ahead of schedule: 287 Russian servicemen have left Georgia around December 31, 2006.
