= Monadire =

Armed militia in Georgia, 1992–2006

- მონადირე
- Leader: Emzar Kvitsiani
- Founded: 1992
- Dissolved: July 2006
- Country: Georgia
- Allegiance: (Georgia (country)) Georgia
- Headquarters: Chkhalta
- Active regions: Upper Kodori Valley
- Status: Disbanded
- Size: 350

Monadire (Georgian: მონადირე) was an armed formation and a militia initially created by Emzar Kvitsiani within Upper Abkhazia. The militia consisted of ethnic Svans living within the Kodori Valley. The Georgian authorities held control over the valley largely thanks to the militia, until its dissolution in 2006.

== History ==
The Monadire militia was formed in 1992 by Emzar Kvitsiani with around 350 members, as they participated in the War In Abkhazia. In 1998, the Monadire militia began to serve as Guards as it was formally introduced into the Georgian Armed Forces as a separate battalion, but in fact continued to be subordinate to Kvitsiani himself, as they actively supported the payment of 150 GEL per month.

The then president, Eduard Shevardnadze appointed Kvitsiani to the local representative of the region. According to a report, Kvitsiani and his militia were involved in the 2001 Kodori crisis, fighting alongside the Chechen commander Ruslan Gelayev.

During the Rose Revolution, the militia supported Eduard Shevardnadze. On 3 December 2004, the National Security Council of Georgia abolished the post of the Presidential Commissioner of Georgia in the Kodori Gorge, assigning these functions to Irakli Alasania, appointed in October 2004 as Chairman of the Council of Ministers of the Autonomous Republic of Abkhazia.

At the same time, the question arose about the fate of the Monadir battalion, which by this time had grown to 860 members. Defense Minister Irakli Okruashvili's proposal to disband the battalion sparked protests from residents of the Kodori Gorge, who complained that they would thus be deprived of protection from the threat they believed posed by peacekeepers and Abkhazians. Then it was proposed to retain the battalion, but reduce it to 350 people and transfer it to the subordination of the Ministry of Internal Affairs. In April 2005, by an unexpected decision of the Georgian Minister of Defense, the Monadire battalion was finally abolished, and Kvitsiani himself was dismissed from the armed forces. Having learned about the order of the Minister of Defense, Irakli Alasania called this decision ill-conceived: "The first stage, the order for abolition, must be followed by the second - the disarmament of the battalion. How are they going to do this? This reaction led to a serious confrontation between these two influential figures, which ended not in Alasania's favor: in March 2006 he left his post, and in June 2006 he was sent into exile as Georgia's representative to the UN, having finally lost the opportunity to influence processes in the country.

When, in July 2006, Okruashvili began to put into action his plan to disarm and replace the militias in the Kodori Gorge with regular army units, Emzar Kvitsiani announced the re-establishment of the Monadire detachment and declared disobedience to the Georgian government, demanding the resignation of the heads of the Ministry of Internal Affairs and the Ministry of Defense Vano Merabishvili and Okruashvili, who, according to Kvitsiani, committed "arbitrariness" against the Svans and prepared their extermination. At the same time, Kvitsiani threatened actions of civil disobedience, and in extreme cases, a transition to armed resistance. The authorities regarded the incident as a rebellion. On July 25, when the Georgian Ministry of Internal Affairs began a "police special operation" in the Kodori Gorge, Kvitsiani and several dozen of his supporters disappeared into the mountains. The Georgian army and police carried out large-scale cleansing operations in the villages of Kodori. Apart from those supporters of Emzar Kvitsiani who were captured by the Georgian military (according to some sources, about 80 people), most of the rebels voluntarily surrendered to the authorities. On 27 July 2006, Georgian President Mikheil Saakashvili announced full control over the Kodori Gorge, effectively disbanding the Militia.
