= 2007 Georgia helicopter incident =

Diplomatic incident involving Russia

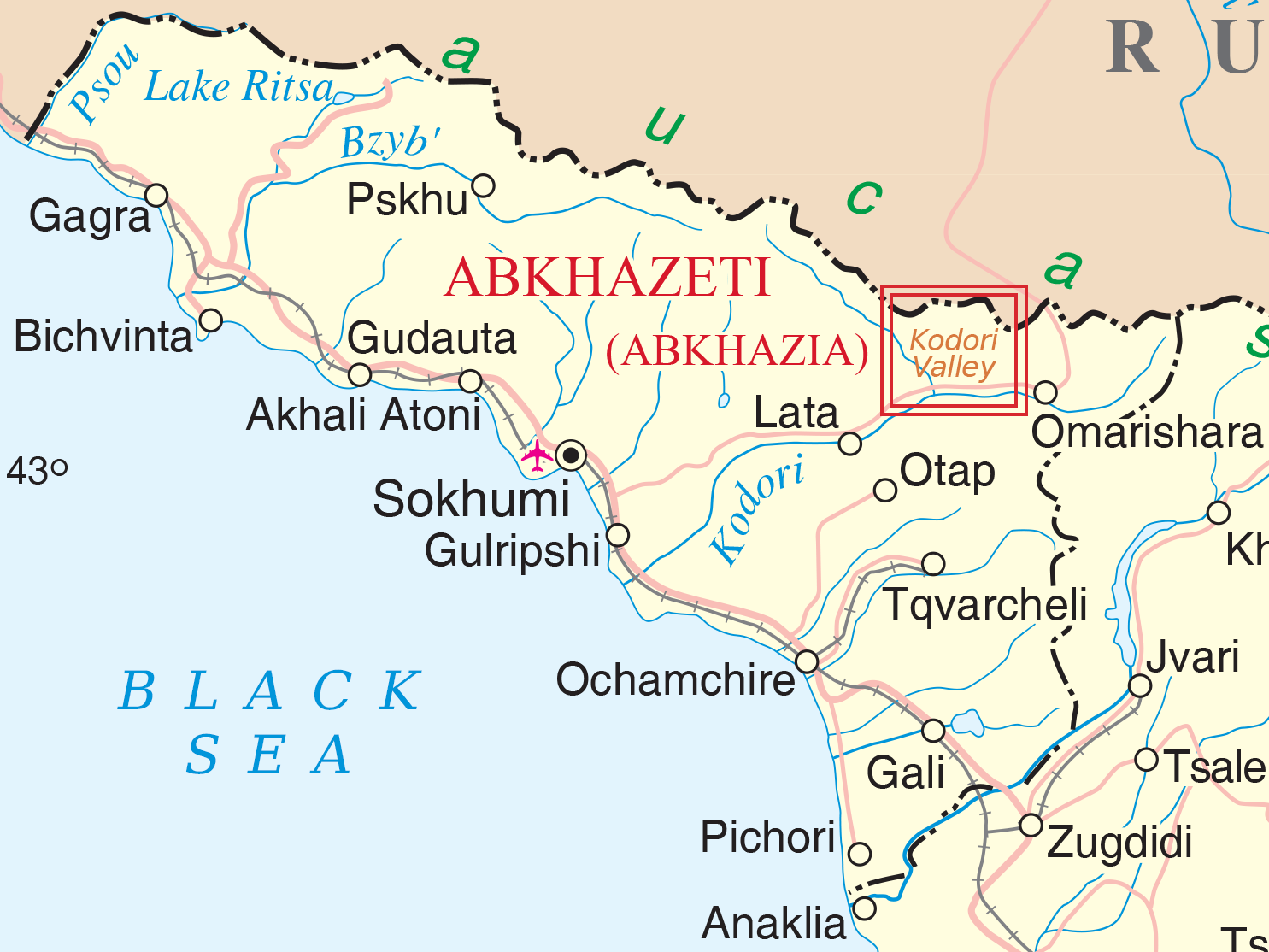
Location of the Kodori Gorge

On 11 March 2007, three military helicopters attacked the village of Chkhalta in Abkhazia, a breakaway republic in north-western Georgia. The village lies in the Kodori Gorge, at the time the only portion of Abkhazia still under Georgian control. Georgia accused Russia of being behind the attack, which damaged a school and the government headquarters of the Georgian-backed Abkhaz government-in-exile. Russia denied the accusations and said all its aircraft near the area were grounded over the weekend.

== Reactions ==
=== Georgia ===
Georgian President Mikheil Saakashvili held an emergency meeting after the alleged incident and told the Security Council that the incident created a grave situation and constituted "a very dangerous, serious and far-reaching provocation" but he stopped short of pointing the finger at Russia directly. He said that he didn't "want to make accusations against one particular side. The [Georgian] foreign minister has received instructions to contact his Russian counterpart and firmly demand that Russia react to this situation."

On 14 March, Nikoloz Rurua, the then deputy chairman of the Georgian parliament's Committee for Defense and Security, did point the finger at Russia as he said that the helicopters came from Russian territory. He further said that the "helicopters, preliminarily identified as Mi-24 attack gunships, flew [into the Kodori Gorge] from Russian territory or, to be precise, from the territory of Kabardino-Balkaria. They made a circle above the villages of Upper Abkhazia, and as they were making a second circle they dropped about 20 unguided rockets, or so-called NURS (Russian-made unguided) rockets." Georgian Deputy Foreign Minister Eka Sguladze made similar allegations in remarks to foreign diplomats that day.

=== Russia ===
The deputy commander of Russia's ground forces, Lieutenant General Valery Yevnevich responded that helicopters could not have flown over the Caucasus mountain range. Yevnevich said:

"From the Russian side, it is impossible for helicopters to find a passage to fly through because of the high mountains. Mount Elbrus is over 5,000 meters high. Helicopters cannot fly over the Caucasus mountain range for technical reasons."

Russian Foreign Ministry spokesman Mikhail Kamynin added that Russia was investigating the circumstances of the shooting, but noted that the air force said it did not conduct flights in the area at the time.

=== Abkhazia ===
Abkhazia's leader Sergei Bagapsh denied such incident.

=== United Nations ===
A quadripartite Joint Fact-Finding Group (JFFG) was convened to investigate the incident. The JFFG, headed by the UN Observer Mission in Georgia, also involved representatives of Russian peacekeepers, and both the Georgian and Abkhaz sides. The interim report was released on 2 April 2007, followed by a supplementary report on 13 June. The report was inconclusive, but it confirmed that "helicopters used multiple approaches from the north" to reach the upper Kodori Gorge. It also ruled out the possibility of Georgia's involvement in the incident.

== Aftermath ==
Georgia accused Russia of a similar incident in August 2007 when a missile was allegedly fired upon Georgian soil, which was denied by Russia. Georgia pressed the UN Security Council to look into both the helicopter and the missile incident.

On 22 August 2007, a plane downing incident took place that involved the downing by Georgia's anti-aircraft system, of a military plane that violated Georgia's air space. Abkhazia's break-away government stated that a plane crashed, and rejected the claim that it was shot down.
