= Bokhundjara incident =

2007 Bokhundjara incident
- Part of Abkhazia conflict
Date	September 20, 2007
Location	Foot of Mount Bokhundjara, Tkvarcheli District, Abkhazia 42°56′0.02″N 41°54′1.04″E
Result	Georgian victory: Aggravation of tensions

Belligerents
Abkhazia; Russia	Georgia

Strength
18 Abkhazians; 2 Russian advisors	8 commandos

Casualties and losses
2 killed (both advisors); 2 wounded 7 captured, later released	none

The 2007 Bokhundjara incident, in Georgia more commonly known as the special operation Kodori 2007, was a confrontation between Georgian Interior Ministry commandos and forces of Georgia's breakaway republic of Abkhazia and Russia near the de facto border in Tkvarcheli District on September 20, 2007. The United Nations Observer Mission in Georgia (UNOMIG) launched an independent investigation of the incident. On October 11, 2007, it released a progress report, confirming the incident took place on Abkhaz-controlled territory at the foot of Mount Bokhundjara, thus confirming the Abkhaz version of the event. On October 27, 2007, Georgia released the arrested Abkhazians and handed them over to the U.N. observers as a "sign of good will."

== Skirmish ==
The clash between the Georgian Interior Ministry forces and Abkhaz unit was first reported by the Georgian side on September 20, 2007. The Abkhaz authorities confirmed the fact and casualties. However, the two reports diverged, on where exactly the clash occurred and which side attacked first. In a shootout, the Abkhaz lost two dead, at least two wounded and seven captured by the Georgian force.

Both Georgian and Abkhaz sources agreed, that the two officers killed in action were Russians, who had formerly served in the CIS peacekeeping forces and then had trained Abkhaz military near the town of Tkvarcheli. However, the Russian military officials denied any involvement of Russian officers in the incident.

After the skirmish, the Abkhaz administration placed its forces on alert and began the mobilization of troops near the Kodori Gorge. On September 21, 2007, the Russian daily Gazeta reported, on the basis of accounts of eyewitnesses, the shootout occurred between the Russian peacekeeping unit and Abkhaz border guards with the resultant casualties on both sides. Neither Abkhaz nor Russian officials have ever commented on this, however.

== Reactions ==
=== Georgian view ===
Georgia maintains, that a group of Abkhaz saboteurs had infiltrated the upper part of the Kodori Valley, which was the only territory of Abkhazia, controlled by the Georgian government, in order to disrupt the construction of a road, connecting Kodori to the Samegrelo-Zemo Svaneti region of Georgia. On September 26, 2007 the President of Georgia, in his address to the U.N. General Assembly, said, that one of the killed in the clash "was a lieutenant colonel of the Russian military and that he was killed during a law enforcement operation against armed separatist insurgents. One has to wonder, what was a vice colonel of the Russian military doing in the Georgian forests, organizing and leading a group of armed insurgents on a mission of subversion and violence?". He once again called for the U.N. to foster the international involvement in Abkhazia and accused Russia of "reckless and dangerous pattern of behavior" in Georgia's conflicts.

=== Abkhazian view ===
The Abkhaz authorities maintain, that a field camp of the Abkhaz border guards, located in the Tkvarcheli District, was attacked by a group of Georgian saboteurs. Abkhazia had accused Georgia of attempting to instigate a full-scale military conflict in order to destabilize the region in the wake of the 2014 Winter Olympics, which are to be held in nearby Sochi. The Abkhaz authorities had earlier warned, that they reserved to themselves the right to undertake measures at any time to gain control of the Upper Kodori Valley.

=== Russian view ===
Sergey Chaban, the commander of the CIS peacekeeping forces in Abkhazia, had stated, that according to a joint investigation with the UNOMIG, the incident occurred on the territory of Abkhazia, 700 meters from the border, thus supporting the claim of the Abkhazian side. However, a UNOMIG representative later stated, that the investigation is still on-going. Responding to Saakashvili's allegations, Vitaly Churkin, the Permanent Representative of Russia to the United Nations, stated, that the killed men were instructors at an "anti-terrorist training centre" and died from head gunshots and knife wounds.

=== United Nations response ===
The Secretary-General of the United Nations expressed his concern with regard to the incident and called on all sides to exercise maximum restraint and to prevent any further escalation of the situation. In its 24 September 2007 press release, the UNOMIG announced, that its Fact Finding Team was independently engaged in establishing facts relating to this incident, including visiting the locations as indicated by the sides, as well as meeting with witnesses.

From September 21 to October 8, the team had visited the Bokhundjara area, interviewing a number of witnesses and participated in the autopsy of the two men, who died in the shootout. Blood samples were taken from the men killed in the incident and from the Bokhundjara area. The German government had agreed to facilitate a DNA analysis of the samples. Having analyzed this evidence, the team had concluded, that the incident had occurred at the location designated by the Abkhaz side, on the Abkhaz side of the administrative boundary, at approximately 300 meters from that boundary. Furthermore, the forensic experts have concluded, that the former Russian officers were killed by automatic weapons fired at short and point-blank range.
