= Kh-58 =

Kh-58 (NATO reporting name: AS-11 'Kilter')
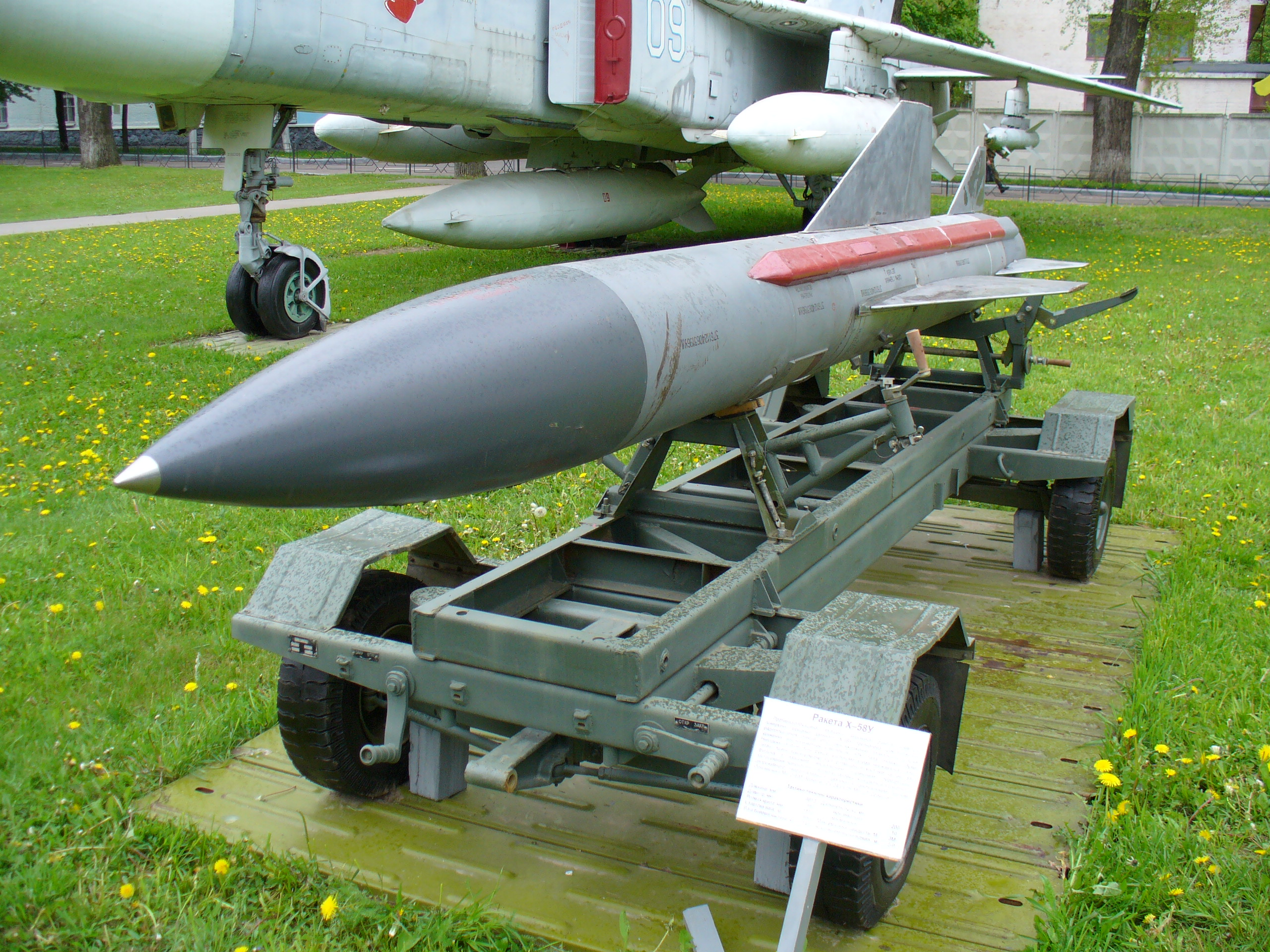
- Kh-58U in the Ukrainian Air Force Museum
- Type: Air-launched anti-radiation missile, surface-to-surface missile
- Place of origin: Soviet Union

Service history
- In service: 1982–present
- Used by: Russia, India, Algeria, Iran
- Wars: Iran–Iraq War; Russo-Georgian War; Russo-Ukrainian War; Russo-Ukrainian war

Production history
- Designed: 1970s
- Manufacturer: Raduga NPO

Specifications
- Mass: 650 kg (1,430 lb)
- Length: 480 cm (15 ft 9 in)
- Diameter: 38 cm (15.0 in)
- Wingspan: 117 cm (46.1 in)
- Warhead: High Explosive
- Warhead weight: 149 kg (328 lb)
- Engine: Solid rocket
- Operational range: Kh-58: up to 120 km (65 nmi); Kh-58U :250 km (130 nmi); Kh-58E: 46–200 km (25–110 nmi)
- Maximum speed: Mach 3.6
- Guidance system: Inertial with passive radar seeker
- Launch platform: Su-24M, Mig-25BM, Su-22M4, Su-25TK, Su-30MK, Su-57E

The Kh-58 (Russian: Х-58; NATO: AS-11 'Kilter') is a Soviet anti-radiation missile with a range of 120 km. As of 2004 the Kh-58U variant was still the primary anti-radiation missile of Russia and its allies. It is being superseded by the Kh-31. The NATO reporting name is "Kilter".

== Development ==
The Bereznyak design bureau had developed the liquid-fuelled Kh-28 (AS-9 ‘Kyle’) and the KSR-5P (AS-6) anti-radiation missiles. They merged with Raduga in 1967, so Raduga was given the contract in the early 1970s to develop a solid-fuel successor to the Kh-28 to equip the new Su-24M 'Fencer-D' attack aircraft. Consequently, the project was initially designated the Kh-24, before becoming the Kh-58.

During the 1980s a longer-range variant was developed, the Kh-58U, with lock-on-after-launch capability. Since the fall of the Soviet Union, Raduga have offered several versions for export.

== Design ==
It was designed to be used in conjunction with the Su-24's L-086A "Fantasmagoria A" or L-086B "Fantasmagoria B" target acquisition system. The range achieved depends heavily on the launch altitude, thus the original Kh-58 has a range of 36 km from low level, 120 km from 10,000 m (32,800 ft), and 160 km from 15,000 m (49,200 ft).

Like other Soviet missiles of the time, the Kh-58 could be fitted with a range of seeker heads designed to target specific air defence radars such as MIM-14 Nike-Hercules or MIM-104 Patriot.

== Operational history ==
The Kh-58 was deployed in 1982 on the Su-24M 'Fencer D' in Soviet service. The Kh-58U entered service in 1991 on the Su-24M and MiG-25BM 'Foxbat-F'. The Kh-58E version can be carried on the Su-22M4 and Su-25TK as well, while the Kh-58UShE appears to be intended for Chinese Su-30MKK's.

Kh-58U missiles were first used in combat in November 1987 by Iraqi MiG-25BMs during the Iran-Iraq war against Iranian MIM-23B Hawk batteries, disabling at least one radar. In July 1988, Iraqi forces used upgraded Kh-58Us and Kh-31Ps against Iranian Westinghouse ADS-4 low-band and long-range early-warning radars, succeeding in destroying a radar site in Subashi with two missiles.

In August 2007, a Russian Kh-58 missile was fired at a Georgian radar site near the town of Tsitelubani, but it missed and failed to explode. During the 2008 Russo-Georgian war, Russian forces made no use of anti-radiation missiles, likely due Georgian air defenses keeping their radar systems turned off until Russian aircraft were in range and turn them back on long enough to acquire and fire at their targets, and a possible lack of confidence of the Russian Air Force in their anti-radiation missiles capabilities following the 2007 Georgia missile incident.

The Kh-58 have also seen use during the 2022 Russian invasion of Ukraine. According to senior sources of the Ukrainian Air Force, some 9K33 Osa and 9K37 Buk systems were destroyed by Kh-31P and Kh-58 missiles during the war.

== Variants ==
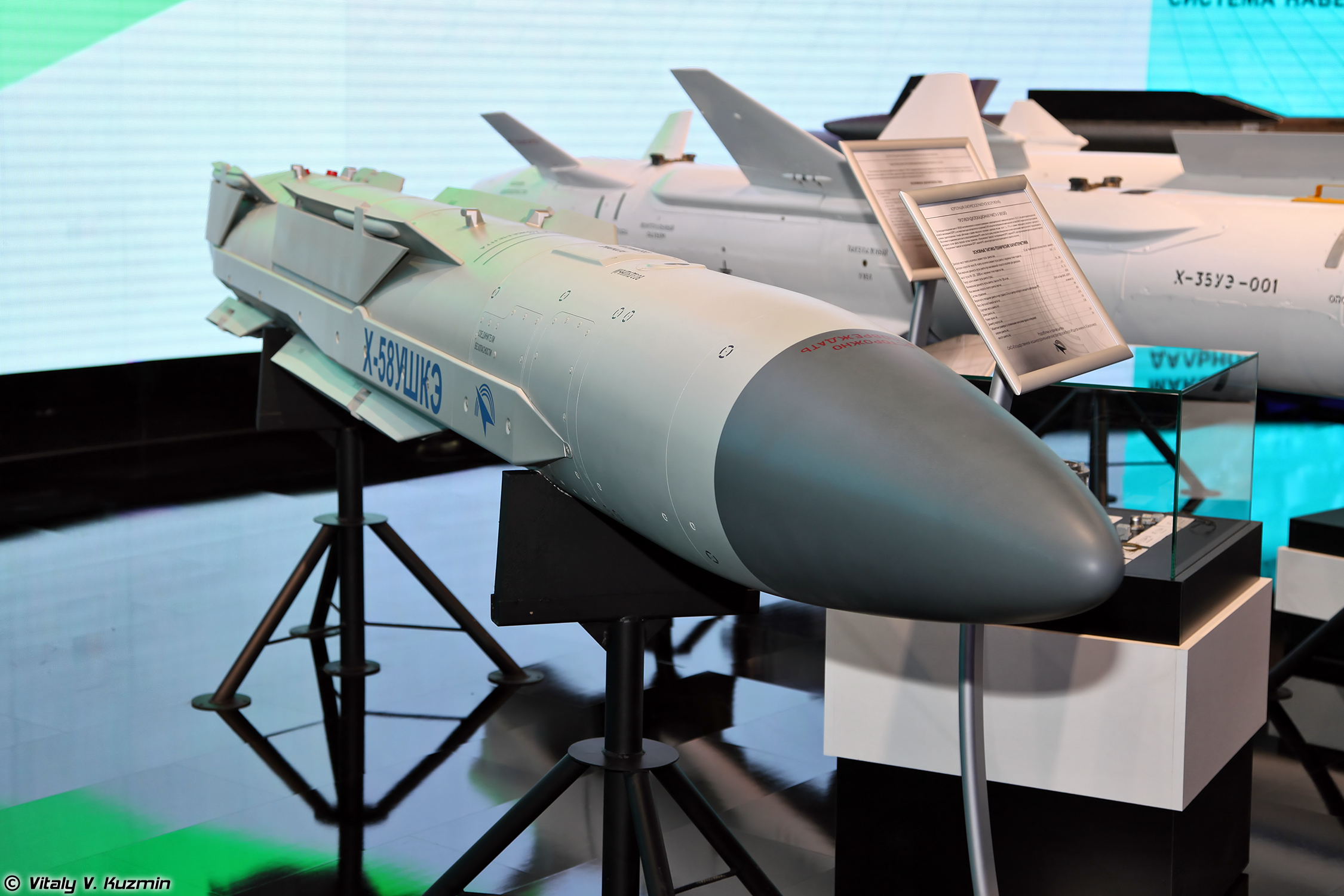
Kh-58UShKE

- Kh-58 (Izdeliye 112) - original version for the Su-24M.
- Kh-58U - improved version with longer range and lock-on-after-launch.
- Kh-58E - export version of Kh-58U, first offered in 1991.
- Kh-58EM - another version offered for export in the 1990s.
- Kh-58UShE (Uluchshennaya Shirokopolosnaya Exportnaya meaning 'Improved, Wideband, Export') - new wideband seeker in new radome, intended for Su-30MK.
- Kh-58UShKE - version with folding fins for internal carriage in the Sukhoi Su-57, first unveiled at MAKS 2007.
- Kh-58UShKE(TP) - version with added imaging infrared seeker, first unveiled at MAKS 2015.

Some Western sources have referred to a Kh-58A that is either optimised for naval radars or has an active seeker head for use as an anti-shipping missile - it probably represents another name for the Kh-58U.

== Operators ==
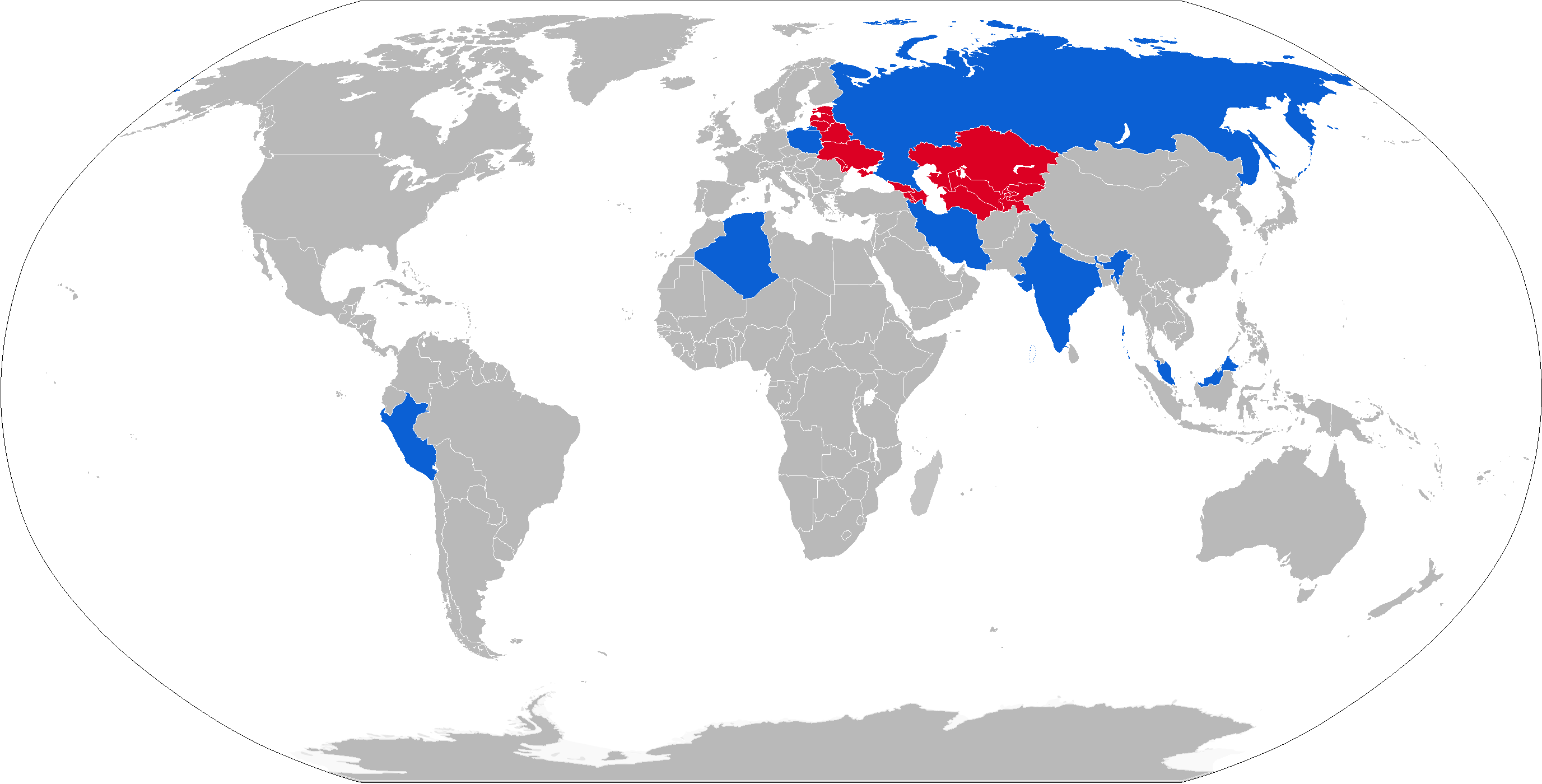
Map with Kh-58 operators in blue and former operators in red

=== Current operators ===
Belarus

- Belarusian Air Force

India

- Indian Air Force

Iran

- Islamic Republic of Iran Air Force

Kazakhstan

- Kazakh Air Defense Forces

Russia

- Russian Aerospace Forces

Uzbekistan

- Uzbekistan Air and Air Defence Forces

=== Former operators ===
Iraq

- Iraqi Air Force

Soviet Union

- Soviet Air Forces

Ukraine

- Ukrainian Air Force

== See also ==
- Martel missile - Anglo-French collaboration with 60 km range
- AGM-88 HARM - Current US Air Force anti-radar weapon, range of 150 km
