= Battle of the Kodori Valley =

Battle in the 2008 Russo-Georgian War

- Part of the Abkhaz-Georgian conflict and the Russo-Georgian War
- Map of the Kodori Valley within Abkhazia
Date	9–12 August 2008 (3 days)
Location	Abkhazia, Western Georgia
Result	Abkhaz-Russian victory: Abkhaz forces capture Upper Abkhazia from Georgia

Belligerents
Abkhazia; Russia	(Georgia (country)) Georgia

Commanders and leaders
(Abkhazia) Sergei Bagapsh (Abkhazia) Mirab Kishmaria (Abkhazia) Anatoly Zaitsev (Russia) Vladimir Shamanov	(Georgia (country)) Mikheil Saakashvili (Georgia (country)) Davit Kezerashvili

Strength
(Abkhazia) 1,000 soldiers (Russia) Five battalions on the Abkhazian front in total, one tactical group blocked the Kodori Valley	(Georgia (country)) 2,500 soldiers on the Abkhazian front in total

Casualties and losses
(Abkhazia) 1 killed	(Georgia (country)) 2 killed

The Battle of the Kodori Valley was a military operation during the Russo-Georgian War in the Upper Kodori Valley of Abkhazia, a breakaway region of Georgia. It was the only part of Abkhazia under Georgian control before this military conflict. On 9 August 2008, the Abkhaz military, with support by Russian forces, launched an operation to remove the remaining Georgian troops from the disputed gorge. After three days, the Georgian military withdrew from the Upper Kodori Valley.

== Abkhaz and Russian army mobilization ==
On 8 August 2008, Ella Polyakova, chairman of Soldiers' Mothers of Petersburg NGO, reported that she had spoken with deputy commander of the Leningrad Military District Ruslan Nekhai who was in Kodori Gorge for "collecting the plants".

The CIS peacekeepers deterred initial Abkhaz attempts to deploy military to the border area with Georgia. Russian ships were deployed to the Black Sea coast of Georgia with the aim of enforcing blockade. According to the Russian Navy, the Russian Black Sea Fleet ships reached Georgia on 10 August 2008. An official in the headquarters of the Russian Navy claimed that "the purpose of the Black Sea Fleet vessels' presence in this region is to provide aid to refugees." Earlier, an Abkhaz spokesman said that after the Georgian naval advance towards the Abkhaz coastline, Russia was requested to deploy its fleet in the Abkhaz waters.

On 10 August 2008, the Georgian authorities said that 6,000 Russian soldiers from North Ossetia had entered South Ossetia. The Georgian government also said that additional 4,000 Russian soldiers arrived in Abkhazia. Alexander Novitsky, an aide to the commander of Russian peacekeepers in Abkhazia, said on 11 August 2008, that Russian military presence in Abkhazia had been increased, totaling now more than 9,000 paratroopers and 350 armoured vehicles. Journalists had witnessed Russian military deployment to Abkhazia during the previous two nights. Before the deployment of 9,000 Russian troops, there were 3,000 Russian peacekeepers already present in Abkhazia.

== Fighting ==
On the morning of 9 August 2008, the United Nations Observer Mission in Georgia (UNOMIG) was asked by the Abkhaz authorities to remove its monitors from the Upper Kodori Valley and all UNOMIG personnel left the valley. Abkhaz president Sergei Bagapsh ordered to expel the Georgian military from the Upper Kodori Valley.

Abkhaz forces opened a second front by attacking the Kodori Gorge, held by Georgia. Abkhaz artillery and aircraft began a bombardment against Georgian troops in the upper Kodori Gorge on 9 August. The upper Kodori Gorge was the only part of Abkhazia controlled by Georgia before this war. Foreign minister of Abkhazia Sergei Shamba told the Itar-Tass agency that an Abkhaz military operation to expel Georgian military from the Kodori gorge had started. Sergei Bagapsh told Interfax news agency that Abkhaz "aviation is currently conducting an operation". Shamba said that a treaty with South Ossetia obliged Abkhazia to move and "Georgian forces in the Kodori Gorge posed a real threat." Shamba also said, "Today was only the initial part of the operation by heavy artillery supported by aviation." Georgia did not confirm full-scale Abkhaz attack on the gorge. On the late evening, the Georgian media reported that Abkhaz and Russian troops had lost 16 people in the assault repelled by Georgian forces near the edge of Upper Abkhazia. Georgian president Mikheil Saakashvili said that assaults against the Georgian-controlled Kodori gorge were repelled.

Abkhaz bombardment of Georgian positions continued on 10 August. Bagapsh claimed that Abkhazia was conducting operation against the Kodori gorge "independently" and gave the Georgian authorities a time to surrender the gorge. The separatist president of Abkhazia said that "around 1,000 special Abkhaz troops" were using "warplanes, multiple rocket launchers and artillery" in operations against Georgian forces, adding that "The operation will enter the next phase as planned." Bagapsh said that a "humanitarian corridor" would be provided for the civilians of the Kodori gorge. He also said that Russia had been asked to defend the sea border of Abkhazia. Bagapsh would start talks with Georgia only after Abkhaz victory. By the evening, Bagapsh said in a statement that his decision to start a military operation against the Upper Kodori Valley was approved by the parliament. Abkhaz authorities announced that 2 Abkhaz servicemen were wounded in the Kodori gorge around 15:15.

UNOMIG reported Russian military deployments to Abkhazia on the morning of 10 August and that Abkhaz military was positioned along the boundary with Georgia by 10 August. 40 Russian planes landed in Sukhumi and delivered military cargo. UNOMIG had reports by late 10 August that most Georgian residents had already abandoned the gorge and there were no Georgian military deployments into or near Abkhazia. Deputy chief of the General Staff of Russia, Anatoliy Nogovitsyn, said that Russia would not "initiate an escalation of the conflict" in Abkhazia. Georgian authorities said that Russian warplanes bombed the Kodori gorge, including the seat of pro-Georgian government of Abkhazia. Ban Ki-Moon, UN secretary general, expressed his concern about the situation. Russian paratroopers supported the Abkhaz troops. On 11 August 2008, Mirab Kishmaria, Abkhaz defense minister, threatened to destroy all Georgian forces in Abkhazia if they did not use the humanitarian corridor. Later, Garri Kupalba, Abkhaz Deputy Minister of Defense, said that there still were 2,500 Georgian soldiers in the Kodori gorge, but 1,000 civilians had used the corridor.

On 12 August 2008, a military offensive against the Kodori Gorge was officially initiated by Abkhaz separatists. Sergei Shamba said that artillery assault of the Georgian positions had started on 11 August to prepare for the offensive. Shamba said, "The operation to liberate Kodori gorge has started." According to Abkhaz claims, there was no Russian participation in the military action against the Kodori gorge. Bagapsh said in the morning that the Abkhaz operation "develops successfully. Everything is up to the plan." He estimated that Abkhazia needed several days to retake the gorge. Abkhaz operation achieved its goal of taking control of the Valley and the Abkhaz flag was flown over the former Georgian administrative building by noon. Abkhaz defence officer said that Georgian forces were expelled from the Kodori Gorge. Major General Anatoly Zaitsev said, "The armed forces of Abkhazia have reached the Georgian border in the Kodori Gorge." Although he claimed that the Russians did not participate in the battle, Russian military traffic headed for the gorge was witnessed by an Associated Press reporter. Georgian president Saakashvili accused Abkhaz of ethnic cleansing. That day, Georgia's Deputy Interior Minister, Eka Zguladze, confirmed the Georgian withdrawal, saying that Georgia withdrew its troops from the Kodori gorge as a "goodwill gesture" and this announcement came at the same time as French president Nicolas Sarkozy was delivering the ceasefire agreement approved by Saakashvili to Moscow.

Although Russian General said on 12 August that Abkhaz military themselves expelled the Georgian troops from Abkhazia, Georgian minister for reintegration Temur Iakobashvili said on 13 August that Russian military had attacked the Georgian forces in the gorge. On 13 August 2008, Abkhaz president Sergei Bagapsh arrived in the Kodori gorge by helicopter on the morning. He declared that the Abkhaz authorities had retaken the only Abkhaz territory controlled by Georgia. Only civilians discovered by the evening were two old women and four monks, since civilians and Georgian forces had fled. Abkhaz military said that a "mountain of weapons" was found. Flocks of bovines left without supervision had also been found.

On 14 August 2008, Matthew Bryza, Deputy United States Assistant Secretary of State, said that Russian peacekeeping forces headed by Sergey Chaban participated in the attack on Kodori. Krasnaya Zvezda newspaper reported in October 2008 that the Georgian forces in Kodori were expecting the attack of the Russian paratroopers from Abkhazia in August 2008, but they found out that the Russian forces were already behind their lines and became demoralized.

== Casualties and war damages ==
Casualties were light on both sides; Abkhaz fighters accidentally killed one of their comrades, and two Georgian soldiers were also killed. Russian soldier from Novosibirsk Oblast was killed in Kodori Gorge on 10 August 2008.

About 2,000 people living in the Kodori Gorge fled. The Abkhaz authorities said they were allowing the return of the refugees, but by late March 2009, only 130 people resided in the Upper Kodori Valley.

According to visitors to the village of Azhara, military stations and shops had suffered, but residential houses were mostly untouched.

== Operations outside Abkhazia ==
Russia bombed the targets near the town of Zugdidi near the Abkhaz border by 10 August 2008. Abkhaz military had begun deployment to the border with Georgia near Zugdidi by 10 August. The Russian peacekeeping commander in Abkhazia Major General Sergei Chaban declared on early 10 August that Georgian military present in the Zugdidi district must lay down arms. Chaban stated that the deadline was set at 06:00 GMT on 11 August and the Russian military would demilitarize the Georgian forces near Abkhazia.

On early 12 August 2008, Russian president Dmitry Medvedev announced he would cease Russian military campaign. In an hour after this announcement, Poti was apparently bombed. Russian forces marched in Poti and took up positions around it. A bridge on the Poti-Batumi road was patrolled by Russian paratroopers and armored vehicles. A reporter for Associated Press witnessed normal life in Zugdidi in spite of the Russian military presence.

Some of the troops occupying Zugdidi were witnessed to be wearing blue peacekeeper helmets while others had green camouflage helmets. Georgian coast guard reported that Russian military reappeared in Poti to target guard's equipment, including radar. An Associated Press Television News team witnessed Russian forces looking for Georgian military hardware near Poti. Regarding Poti, Nogovitsyn only said that Russian troops were acting within their "area of responsibility."

On 16 August 2008, the Georgian Ministry of Foreign Affairs said that the boundary with Abkhazia was unilaterally changed to run along the Inguri River by the Russian military and the Abkhaz separatists. 13 Georgian villages in the buffer zone (situated between the Gali district and the Zugdidi district) and the Inguri hydroelectric power station were now controlled by Abkhazia.

On 19 August 2008, Los Angeles Times reported that Russian troops were occupying an estate in Zugdidi reportedly belonging to the President of Georgia.

== See also ==
- 2001 Kodori crisis
- Abkhaz-Georgian conflict
- Ethnic cleansing of Georgians in Abkhazia
