= Kh-28 =

Kh-28 (NATO reporting name: AS-9 'Kyle')
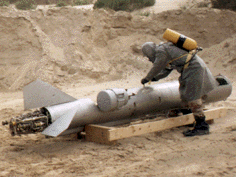
- USAF EOD specialist disassembles presumed Kh-28 – Iraq 1991
- Type: air-launched anti-radiation missile
- Place of origin: Soviet Union

Service history
- In service: 1973–current
- Used by: FSU, Warsaw Pact, India, Iraq, Vietnam

Production history
- Designer: Alexander Yakovlevich Bereznyak
- Manufacturer: MKB Raduga

Specifications
- Mass: 720 kg (1,590 lb)
- Length: 597 cm (19 ft 7 in)
- Diameter: 43 cm (16.9 in)
- Wingspan: 193 cm (6 ft 4.0 in)
- Warhead: Blast fragmentation
- Warhead weight: 160 kg (353 lb)
- Engine: Two-stage liquid-fuel rocket
- Operational range: 110 km (59 nmi)
- Maximum speed: Mach 3.0
- Guidance system: Inertial guidance with passive radar seeker
- Launch platform: Su-17M/Su-20/Su-22M, Su-24M, Tu-16, MiG-25BM, MiG-27, Tu-22M

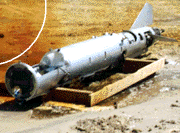
Presumed Kh-28 emitting IRFNA (Inhibited Red fuming nitric acid) fumes – Iraq, April 1991

The Kh-28 (Russian: Х-28; Nisan-28; NATO: AS-9 'Kyle') was the first Soviet anti-radiation missile (ARM) for tactical aircraft. It entered production in 1973 and is still carried on some Sukhoi Su-22s in developing countries but is no longer in Russian service. Use of the Kh-28 was restricted by its weight, limited seeker head, bulk and fuelling requirements, and it was superseded by the smaller, solid-fuel Kh-58 (AS-11 'Kilter') in the early 1980s.

== Development ==
Soviet offensive doctrine in the early 1960s assumed that widespread use of nuclear weapons would disable Western radar-based air defence systems through electromagnetic pulses (EMP) effects. Consequently, they paid little attention to the development of ARMs. However, in January 1963 the Berezniak design bureau (which became MKB Raduga in 1967) was tasked with developing such a missile as part of the K-28P weapon complex based around a "Wild Weasel" version of the Yak-28 'Brewer' bomber (hence -28; the 'K' stands for kompleks, P stands for protivradiolokatsyonny 'anti-radar').

The main difficulty came in the design of the APR-28 guidance system undertaken by CKB-111 (later NPO Avtomatika). This meant that the Kh-28 missile was not ready until the 1970s. Flight trials were carried out on a Yak-28N, but by then the Yak-28 had ceased production and was perceived as obsolete, and the K-28P system was cancelled. Instead the Kh-28 was adapted for use by standard attack aircraft, in particular the Su-24 'Fencer-A' and Su-17M 'Fitter-C'.

== Design ==
The Kh-28 was the first liquid-fuel Soviet ARM and was quickly replaced by the solid-fuel Kh-58 missile, according to research from Dr. Carlo Kopp, the editor in chief of Air Power Australia.

The design of the Kh-28 was similar to – but smaller than – Raduga's Kh-22 (AS-4 'Kitchen') and KSR-5 (AS-6 'Kingfish') anti-shipping missiles. The Su-24 could carry one under each wing, and used the onboard Filin ('Eagle Owl') targeting system. The Su-17M could only carry one Kh-28 on the centreline, and used the Myetyel/Metel ('Blizzard') system in a pod under the right wing, later replaced by the Vyuga ('Snowstorm') pod.

The APR-28 seeker on the original Kh-28 could only target the MIM-14 Nike-Hercules and English Electric Thunderbird SAM systems, although the Filin could recognise other frequencies. The Kh-28M had an updated X-band seeker that could recognise the MIM-23 Hawk's AN/MPQ-33 and subsequent AN/MPQ-39 target-illumination radars, and the AN/MPQ-34 low-level target-acquisition radar. Other seekers may have been produced.

The propulsion system consists of a fuel tank and a separate tank for the red fuming nitric acid (RFNA) oxidiser. One problem was that the missile required fuelling just before flight, and not many airfields had the appropriate facilities. Range is given variously as 80–95 km or 120 km.

== Operational history ==
The Kh-28 entered service with the Soviet Air Force in 1973, and has been widely exported. It was cleared for use on the Su-17M/Su-20/Su-22M, Su-24M, Tupolev Tu-16, Mikoyan-Gurevich MiG-25BM, MiG-27 and Tupolev Tu-22M aircraft. It was also tested on an Antonov An-12BL SEAD variant of the transport that could carry four of the missiles. A missile believed to be a Kh-28 was captured in Iraq by US forces during the first Gulf War in April 1991. One man was burnt by RFNA from the oxidiser tank while he was making it safe.

== Operators ==
- Russia
- Syria
- Vietnam

others

- Libya from Libya aviation arsenals
- Azerbaijan
- Georgia unknown, active or depot in stockage or not operational
- Kazakhstan unknown, maybe active or on depot stockage
- Ukraine unknown status or not operational
- Belarus unknown, probably active or stockage in depot

=== Former operators ===
- Soviet Union passed on to successor states
- Afghanistan
- Hungary
- Iraq
- Peru
- Poland
- South Yemen

== Variants ==
- Kh-28 (Izdeliye 93, D-8) - original version targeting Nike-Hercules and Thunderbird SAMs
- Kh-28M - improved version capable against Hawk and possibly other radars
- Kh-28E - export version
- Nisan-28 or Nissan-28 - Iraqi version of Kh-28E displayed in Baghdad in 1989 that was reported to have three seeker heads for different frequency bands.

== Similar weapons ==
- AGM-78 Standard ARM – US anti-radar missile with similar range but only Mach 2.0
- Martel missile AS37 – Anglo-French first-generation anti-radar missile, subsonic with 60 km range
