= 2007 Abkhazia plane downing incident =

Unconfirmed aerial incident over Georgia

The 2007 Georgia plane downing incident refers to the possible downing, by Georgia's anti-aircraft system, of a military plane that violated Georgia's air space on August 21, 2007. It is still not confirmed by Georgia whether the plane was downed. Abkhazia's break-away government stated that a plane crashed, and rejected the claim that it was shot down.

== Reactions and views ==
=== Georgia ===
On the official website of the Georgia's Foreign Ministry a statement was published that on August 21 a fighter jet flying from Russia twice violated Georgian airspace in Georgia's breakaway Abkhazia region. It further reported that Georgian anti-aircraft systems tracked the incursions and that an official note of protest demanding an explanation had been sent to Russia's Foreign Ministry. According to Georgia the planes were flying at a speed of between 450 and 490 km/h (about 280 to 300 mph). While at first it seemed that a second similar incident happened on August 22, it later appeared to be the same incident as that of August 21.

A senior Georgian government official stated on 24 August that Georgian forces had fired at the allegedly Russian aircraft. He could not confirm whether the plane was shot down, but added that a nearby section of forest, in Abkhazia's Kodori Gorge (Upper Abkhazia), was on fire, and Georgian Interior Ministry spokesman Shota Utiashvili said residents reported hearing "an explosion" after Georgian forces fired on the plane. Investigators have been dispatched to examine whether the plane was downed. Georgian officials said that the possible downing was not reported earlier because they were still checking information.

On August 26, the Georgian Foreign Ministry's website published a statement saying that from August 20–22, the "continuous violation of Georgian airspace was observed by the radars of the Defense Ministry and eyewitnesses" in Upper Abkhazia. Utiashvili explained that "these planes entered from, and returned to, Russia, therefore we think they were Russian planes. This is why we want Russia to take part in the investigation." Georgian Deputy Foreign Minister Georgy Mandzhgaladze stated earlier that Georgia was close to participating in a NATO program that would integrate Georgia's radar system into that of NATO. This would give the alliance more information about Georgia's airspace and would help determine the truth if similar incidents would occur.

=== Russia ===
The Russian Ministry of Defence denied the accusation and General Yuri Baluyevsky dismissed Georgia's claim of Russian planes violating its airspace as "hallucinations" because "warplanes do not fly at such speed. Even helicopters fly at only slightly lower speeds." Russia also suggested that Georgian leaders fabricated the incidents to derail planned consultations about South Ossetia.

On August 26, the Russian Ministry of Defence strongly denied that Russian jets violated Georgian territory, referring to Georgia's accusation that Russian jets violated Georgia's air space continuously during August 20–22. Aleksandr Drobyshevsky said that "All our jets were at the airdromes at the time when the ostensible intrusion into Georgian airspace took place“. He added that Air Force jets "didn't make any flights in the area."

=== Abkhazia ===
The de facto foreign minister of Abkhazia, Sergei Shamba, confirmed on August 26 that an unidentified plane went down over its territory this week and said that he believed it to be a Georgian plane or perhaps even a US spy plane. He further added the plane "has in the past repeatedly violated our airspace. It went down by itself, no one downed it." He said the plane came from the Black Sea and went down in the mountains of Upper Abkhazia.
