= 2006 Georgian local elections =

- 5 October 2006
- Turnout: 48.3%
Party	UNM	RPG-CPG bloc	Labour Party
Councillors	1,503	54	39
Councillors +/–	▲1,488	▲39	▼113
Party	Industrialists	The Way of Georgia
Councillors	27	3
Councillors +/–	▼454	New

Local elections were held in Georgia on October 5, 2006. The elections followed a decree issued on August 26 by President of Georgia Mikheil Saakashvili, setting the date for the local ballot.

== Background ==
Being the first election since the immediate aftermath of the Rose Revolution, the vote was considered to be the first major test of the authorities commitment to a transparent process in non-revolutionary circumstances. In addition, they were to demonstrate the level of public confidence in both the ruling NMD - after a series of scandals - and the opposition, which has begun to strengthen and reorganise that year.

The elections coincided with a very tense period of relations with Russia. After a major diplomatic row regarding alleged Russian spying, the Kremlin has severed all transport and post links with Georgia.

== Electoral system ==
The 2005 reforms abolished the two-level system of self-government, that is, the councils of villages and small towns were abolished. Instead, only the councils of municipalities (formerly called raions, which consisted of villages and small towns) and big cities were retained. The big cities were categorized as "self-governing cities". Tbilisi, Rustavi, Kutaisi, Poti and Batumi possessed the status of self-governing city. The elections were thus held for 65 local councils instead of 1000 in 1998. The elections of gamgebelis and mayors were also abolished. The council elections were held through a mixed electoral system. The threshold in the proportional vote increased to 5%. The majoritarian candidate would need to receive most of the votes to secure a seat. In Tbilisi, the party winning the proportional vote in each electoral district would receive all seats allocated to that district.

== Aftermath ==
According to preliminary results, the elections were won by the United National Movement led by President Saakashvili with an overwhelming majority. The predominantly Armenian-populated Akhalkalaki Municipality was the only one where an opposition grouping, the Industry Will Save Georgia Party, won a majority of votes. According to international observers, particularly the OSCE Office for Democratic Institutions and Human Rights (ODIHR) and the Congress of Local and Regional Authorities of the Council of Europe, the "municipal elections in Georgia were conducted with general respect for fundamental freedoms; however, the blurred distinction between the ruling authorities and the leading party reinforced the advantage of the incumbents".

== National results ==
A total of 1,694 mandates were distributed throughout Georgia, comprising 748 seats allocated by the proportional system and 946 majoritarian seats, with the vast majority awarded to the National Movement:

Party	Seats		
Party	Proportional	Constituency	Total
National Movement	578	925	1503
RPG-CPG bloc	45	9	54
Labour Party	34	5	39
ISWG	23	4	27
The Way of Georgia	0	3	3
Independent	68	0	68
Total	748	946	1694

== Tbilisi Sakrebulo election results ==
Party	Votes	%	Seats			+/–	Government
Party	Votes	%	Proportional	Constituency	Total	+/–	Government
National Movement	204 261	66.53	9	25	34	▲20	Government
RPG-CPG bloc	36 973	12.04	1	0	1	New	Opposition
Labour Party	32 701	10.65	1	0	1	▼14	Opposition
ISWG	18 671	6.08	1	0	1	▼3	Opposition
The Way of Georgia	8 512	2.77	0	0	0	New	Extra-parliamentary
PGNI	74	0.02	0	0	0	New	Extra-parliamentary
Total	307 015	100			37	±	
Electorate/voter turnout	883 806	34.74					
Source: ,
