= Emzar Kvitsiani =

Former Georgian military commander and politician

- ემზარ კვიციანი
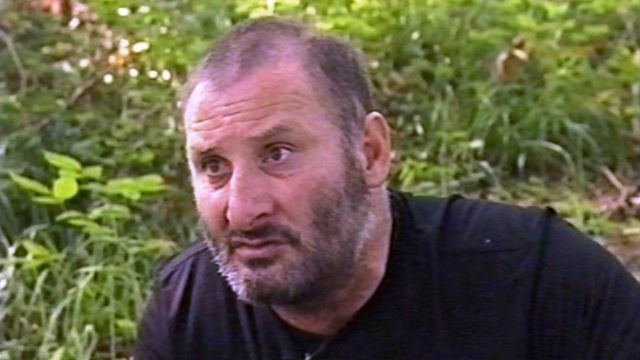
- Kvitsiani in 2006
- Born: 25 April 1961 (age 65); Chkhalta, Abkhaz ASSR, Georgian SSR, Soviet Union (now Abkhazia, Georgia)
- Military career
- Allegiance: Georgia
- Conflicts: Abkhaz–Georgian conflict; War in Abkhazia (1992–1993); 2001 Kodori crisis; 2006 Kodori crisis

Emzar Kvitsiani (Georgian: ემზარ კვიციანი, [ɛmzɑr kʼvitsʰiɑni]; born 25 April 1961) is a former Georgian military commander, warlord, and politician.

Born in 1961 in the Abkhaz ASSR, an autonomous region of the Georgian SSR, one of the 15 republics of the Soviet Union, Kvitsiani took part in the War in Abkhazia (1992–1993), forming a paramilitary group the Monadire in the upper Kodori Valley, guarding it from Abkhaz forces. He was mainly active in the valley, which he de facto ruled over through his militia from 1992 to 2006.

In 1999, President Eduard Shevardnadze appointed Kvitsiani to the post of presidential special envoy to the Kodori Valley. Kvitsiani allegedly cooperated with Chechenfield commander Ruslan Gelayev in 2001 in an attempt to bring Abkhazia back under Georgian government control.

Kvitsiani later opposed the 2003 Rose Revolution, which subsequently led to confrontation with the Georgia's central authorities under Mikheil Saakashvili. As president, Sakaashvili removed him from his official government position in December 2004. In April of 2005, as Minister of Defense, Irakli Okruashvili disbanded the Monadire entirely. Kvitsiani declared that he would openly defy the authorities and was subsequently ousted from the Kodori Valley in 2006. He fled to the Russian Federation’s North Caucasus region, where he lived for several years, but was arrested when he returned to Georgia in 2014.

Kvitsiani was initially sentenced to 16 years in jail, but was then released under a plea bargain in early 2015. He was one of the leaders of the Alliance of Patriots of Georgia and a member of Parliament of Georgia.

== Career ==
Kvitsiani was born in 1961 in the village of Chkhalta, part of the predominantly ethnic Georgian Svan upper Kodori valley in the then-Soviet Abkhazia, an autonomous republic within the Georgian SSR. He finished the Novosibirsk Institute of National Economy and later graduated the Kyiv General Staff Academy with honors. According various reports, he had a criminal record during the Soviet period. A detailed academic study claims he developed contacts to Soviet organized crime while in jail, and that after his release he was involved in running illegal casinos in Abkhazia.

After the secessionist war broke out in Abkhazia in 1992, Kvitsiani organized a militia force of several hundred fighters named Monadire ("the Hunter") in the upper Kodori valley in order to fend off the Abkhaz threat. He succeeded in keeping the strategically crucial gorge under the control of his militia after the retreat of the Georgian forces from Abkhazia in 1993, though militia in the area reportedly also demanded money and possessions from fleeing civilians, in exchange for passage. Following the war, Kvitsiani maintained nominal dependence on the central government of Georgia. The then-President of Georgia Eduard Shevardnadze attempted to channel Kvitsiani's activities into the legal framework of the Georgian state apparatus. Kvitsiani was appointed deputy special state envoy to the Kodori valley in 1997 and then special state envoy to that area in 2000. He and his men entertained good relations with the Abkhaz people despite numerous skirmishes and incidents occurring over the years. According to his own claims, Abkhaz representatives occasionally tried to persuade him to sign a four-sided treaty that would effectively transfer control of the valley over to the Sukhumi administration. Kvitsiani however always refused and also countered various armed incursions, mostly in a pacifying manner. He earned the Abkhazians respect by treating prisoners well and in some cases even releasing them with their arms returned. In 1998, his militia was made a special battalion of the Georgian Armed Forces, but the government had little control of it. In 2004 on behalf of the Georgian government Emzar Kvitsiani was also engaged and partially responsible in convincing the Abkhazians to clear minefields that were deployed during the war. In return minefields laid by the Georgian army would be removed as well.

Kvitsiani's role in the abduction of the United Nations and Georgian officials in Kodori in the 1990s, the 2001 Kodori crisis, and various supposed criminal activities in the region have been disputed. During the Rose Revolution in Georgia in November 2003, he was in Tbilisi and supported Shevardnadze, after whose abdication, Kvitsiani was removed from his official position by the new President Mikheil Saakashvili in December 2004, while his unit was declared disbanded in April 2005. Kvitsiani defied the move and, on 22 July 2006, declared disobedience to the government of Georgia. In an ensuing crisis, the Georgian forces moved in into the valley and besieged Kvitsiani in Chkhalta. In a clash that the Georgian military's US advisers would later view as "less than stellar" according to Radio Free Europe/Radio Liberty, Kvitsiani did not put up significant resistance. During a crossfire, a local woman was killed. To avoid further casualties, Kvitsiani and the remnant of his followers were allowed through a military cordon. Georgia set up a local administration of the valley under the aegis of the Government of the Autonomous Republic of Abkhazia, but lost control over it during the August 2008 Russia–Georgia war. Kvitsiani has repeatedly stressed and maintains to this date that the former Georgian leadership under grip of powerful outside influence has purposefully worked towards handing over the Kodori valley and that it was their plan all along.

After his ouster from the Kodori valley, Kvitsiani eventually fled to the Russian North Caucasus, from where he issued threats of guerrilla warfare to the Georgian government. Later caught by Russian special services, he managed to escape after reportedly being tortured. He remained wanted by Georgia for charges related to the formation of an illegal armed group and an armed mutiny. His sister, Nora Kvitsiani, was arrested on similar charges and sentenced 6.5 years in prison, but she was released by a parole board.

== Arrest and trial ==
On 28 February 2014, Kvitsiani, flew from Moscow to Tbilisi, where he was arrested upon his arrival at the Tbilisi International Airport. He declared he knew the authorities were going to arrest him, but he wanted to cooperate and seek justice. On 17 November 2014, a court in the west Georgian town of Zugdidi found Kvitsiani guilty of mutiny and of forming an illegal armed group — charges Kvitsiani denied. He was sentenced to 16 years in jail, but released after the Kutaisi court of appeals approved a plea bargain deal between him and the prosecution on 28 January 2015.

== Political engagement post-2015 ==
Kvitsiani is one of the leaders of the Alliance of Patriots of Georgia, a populist party that gained six seats in the parliamentary elections in Georgia in October 2016.

In 2018, Kvitsiani proposed a law to ban the wearing of burqa and niqab in public. The parliament of Georgia considered the proposal. Kvitsiani has also been seen at several rallies in Tbilisi held by Georgian March, a far-right, anti-LGBT and anti-immigration group.

During a televised interview in April 2018, Kvitsiani said that he was forced to collaborate with Russian special services, notably with the GRU. He said that he was forced to make statements by them, although "as for statements, for me an important thing was, that they [Russian special services] would not offer me any activities, but statements meant nothing for me." He said that his family was held in Moscow and he had to make these statements to save his family.
