= Upper Abkhazia =

Azhara Municipality ზემო აფხაზეთი
- Municipality
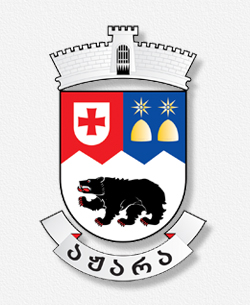
- Flag Coat of arms

- Country: Georgia
- Capital: Tbilisi (in-exile)
- Former seat: Chkhalta (before 2008)

Government
  - Governor: Mevlud Jachvliani

Area
  - Total: 2,540 km^{2} (980 sq mi)

Population
  - Total: 2,008
  - Density: 0.791/km^{2} (2.05/sq mi)

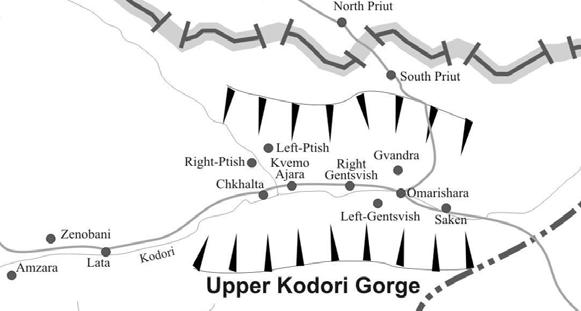
Upper Kodori Gorge and its settlements

Upper Abkhazia (Georgian: ზემო აფხაზეთი, romanized: Zemo Apxazeti; Abkhaz: Аҧсны хыхьтәи, romanized: Apsny xyxjtwj), commonly known by its administrative name, Azhara Municipality, is a geographical term and municipality of the Autonomous Republic of Abkhazia. The term was first introduced in 2006, to denote the northeastern part of the disputed territory of Abkhazia, that had remained under Georgian control after the 1992 War in Abkhazia. From September 2006 to August 2008 its main village, Chkhalta, hosted the Government of the Autonomous Republic of Abkhazia and was the seat of the Azhara municipal community. This situation came to an end in the Battle of the Kodori Valley in August 2008, when Upper Abkhazia was conquered by the Russo-Abkhazia armies, which had already controlled the rest of Abkhazia. Even though the area was no longer controlled by Georgia, the Georgian Government kept its municipal status as a sign of not recognizing any changes to the Abkhazian administrative divisions made by the breakaway republic. The current seat of the municipal government-in-exile is Tbilisi.

== Geography ==
Geographically, Upper Abkhazia comprised the Upper Kodori Valley, the Chkhalta Ridge and the Marukhi Pass on the border with the Russian Federation. It was populated by some 2,000 people, chiefly ethnic Georgians (Svans). The area has a size of approximately 29% of Abkhazia's territory and is of high strategic importance, due to its proximity to the Abkhaz-held capital of Sukhumi and other important cities in the region.

== History ==
The term Upper Abkhazia has been largely used by the Georgian officials and media since the successful operation of Georgian forces in the Kodori Valley in July 2006, which established firmer Georgian presence in the region. Before that the Georgian government had exercised a very loose control over Kodori, even though the Abkhaz separatist forces had never been able to penetrate the valley and the area had largely been run, since 1994, by the local warlord Emzar Kvitsiani, who was dislodged in the Georgian police operation in 2006.

On September 27, 2006, on the 13th anniversary of the fall of Sukhumi to the Abkhaz rebels and their allies from the Northern Caucasus (1993), the Kodori region and the adjacent pieces of land, governed by Georgia, were officially renamed Upper Abkhazia and declared a "temporary administrative center" of Abkhazia and the headquarters of the de jure Abkhazian government. In spite of Abkhaz and Russian protests, a new office of the de jure government was inaugurated, on the same day, by a high ranking delegation from Georgia's capital, Tbilisi, including President Mikheil Saakashvili and the Catholicos Patriarch Ilia II.

The area underwent a major rehabilitation program, including the reconstruction of infrastructure and reinforcement of security services. The Central Election Commission of Georgia had established the constituency of Upper Abkhazia, allowing the population of the area, for the first time in the history of Georgia, to take part in the 2006 Georgian local elections.

On August 12, 2008, during the 2008 South Ossetia War, Russian and Abkhaz forces gained control of Upper Abkhazia in the Battle of the Kodori Valley.

== See also ==
- Kodori Valley
- Sadzen
