= Chkhalta =

Village in Gulripshi District, Abkhazia

Chkhalta ჩხალთა (Georgian) Чҳалҭа (Abkhaz)
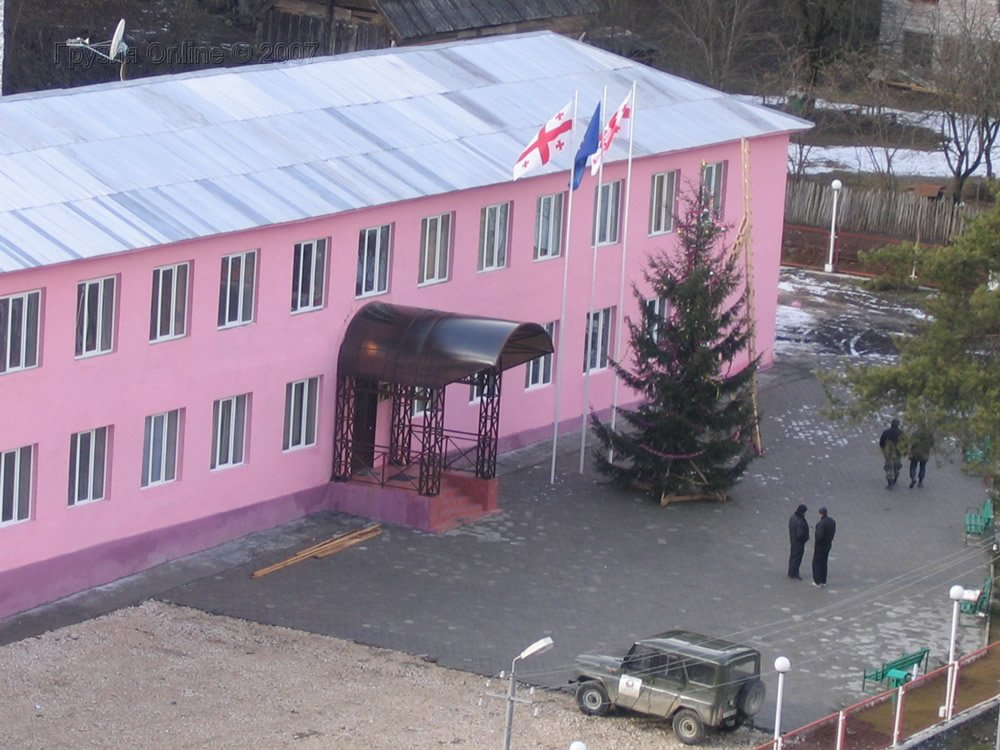
- The House of the Government of Abkhazian Autonomous Republic, Azhara, Upper Abkhazia

- Location within Georgia Location within Abkhazia
- Coordinates: 43°05′48″N 41°40′24″E
- Country: Georgia
- Partially recognized independent country: Abkhazia
- District: Gulripshi
- Time zone: UTC+3 (MSK)
  - Summer (DST): UTC+4

Chkhalta (Georgian: ჩხალთა; Abkhaz: Чҳалҭа; Russian: Чхалта) is a village in the upper part of the Kodori Valley, situated in Gulripshi District, Abkhazia, a breakaway republic from Georgia.

== History ==
Chkhalta is considered to be "Tsakhar" of the Byzantine sources by a considerable number of scholars. Here, in 556, the battle took place between the Byzantine army and rebellious Misimians, a local proto-Georgian tribe. The Missimians revolted during the Lazic War against the Byzantine rule and sided with the Sasanian Empire, but the Sasanians could offer no help as they were defeated by the Byzantine army at Phasis (Poti). Misimian rebels fortified themselves in the fortress of Tsakhar, but they were defeated by the Byzantine army. The Misimians continued to fight, but ultimately the revolt was suppressed.

Prior to August 2008, Chkhalta was part of 'Upper Abkhazia', and once housed the headquarters of a now defunct armed formation Monadire. It was the only part of the region controlled by the Georgian government after the 1992–1993 War in Abkhazia. During the August 2008 Russo-Georgian war, Abkhaz separatists gained control of Chkhalta and the rest of Upper Abkhazia. Most of Chkalta's inhabitants fled the advancing troops and have yet to return.

== See also ==
- 2007 Georgia helicopter incident
- Gulripshi District
