= 2001 Kodori crisis =

Confrontation in the Abkhaz–Georgian conflict

- Part of the Abkhaz–Georgian conflict, Second Chechen War and the Pankisi Gorge crisis
- Map of the Kodori Gorge within Abkhazia
Date	Initial phase: October 3/4–18/24, 2001; Low intensity phase: October 18/24–November 1, 2001
Location	Primary theater: Kodori Valley, Abkhazia / Secondary theaters: Sukhumi & Gulripshi
Result	See Aftermath

Belligerents
Abkhazia Russia: CIS	(Georgia (country)) Georgia Chechen Republic of Ichkeria	(United Nations) UNOMIG

Commanders and leaders
Vladislav Ardzinba; Valery Arshba; Anri Jergenia	Eduard Shevardnadze; Aslan Abashidze; Koba Kobaladze; Emzar Kvitsiani; Irakli Menagarishvili; Davit Tevzadze Ruslan Gelayev	Dieter Boden (Note: As head of UNOMIG); Anis Bajwa (Note: Major General, as Chief Military Observer)

Units involved
Abkhazian Armed Forces Russian Air Force	Monadire; Georgian guerrillas	Peacekeeping forces

Strength
Equipment; Alleged 5 helicopters of Russian origin	Personnel; ~250–500 (~1000 Gelayev aligned fighters); ~350 Georgian reinforcements; Equipment; 8 UH-1H Helicopters, 11 Т-55АМ2, 42 122 mm D-30 Towed Howitzers	Personnel; ~459

Casualties and losses
Unknown	~6-15 KIA, 3 POWs	1 accidental, 1 Mil Mi-8 shot down, ~10 KIA
- At least 40–60 killed,

The 2001 Kodori crisis was a military confrontation in the Kodori Valley region of Abkhazia in October 2001. The conflict involved ethnic Chechen fighters, supported by a local Georgian militia, against Abkhaz separatist forces. The fighting resulted in the deaths of at least 40–60 people and the aerial bombardment of three villages.

== Operational Timeline ==
=== Escalation and outbreak ===
On the evening of October 3, 2001, a joint Georgian-Chechen force of approximately 400–500 men (another source claims ~1000 men), led by commander Ruslan Gelayev, entered the gorge with Georgian trucks from the Georgian side in a covert operation; originating from the Pankisi Gorge [500 kilometers away] which had been a Chechen refugee/militant hub due to the concurrent Second Chechen War. They attacked and captured the village of Georgievskoe in the Gulripshi district of Abkhazia, which resulted in five casualties; and one Chechen POW which the Abkhaz forces had captured.

On October 8, at approximately 9:20 AM, a United Nations Observer Mission in Georgia (UNOMIG) helicopter was shot down over the Kodori Gorge near Lake Amtkeli. The aircraft was struck by grenade launchers or missile projectiles, resulting in the deaths of all nine or ten people on board.

Noteworthy is that, during the early period of October 2001, the Georgian state "had extradited 13 Chechen guerrillas to Russia", thus cooperating with Russia's efforts in the Caucasus region, in combating Chechen fighters and "foreign mujaheddin".

=== Intensification of combat ===
That same night, unidentified assailants launched an attack on the Armenian village of Naa (alternatively spelled Haa), supported by air cover. The assault resulted in the deaths of 14 people, including one Russian citizen. Concurrently, President Eduard Shevardnadze offered the use of Georgian airspace to the United States for operations in Afghanistan.

On October 9, at approximately 5:10AM alleged unidentified helicopters flew over village of Omarishara from the direction of Sakeni, then at 6:00AM, four SU-25 jets of unknown allegiance bombed Omarishara, during the rest of the day, nine unidentified aircraft bombed several villages in the Georgian-controlled portion of the gorge; including Lata and Chkhalta, with at least one confirmed casualty. Throughout this period, the Russian Air Force conducted strikes against Chechen fighters who had infiltrated the area. By October 10, Abkhaz forces reportedly surrounded roughly 200-500 combatants described as having Georgian, Chechen, Arab, and Azeri origins; engagement on that day left six fighters dead and two captured, while another source claim states 15 "guerrillas" KIA; thereafter, around 100 Gelayhev aligned fighters broke out of the encirclement on the 13th of October.

=== Political and military shifts ===
On October 11, Georgia deployed around ~350 troops as reinforcements to its positions in the gorge as a defensive measure. The following day, the Georgian Parliament voted 157–2 in favor of the withdrawal of CIS peacekeepers from Abkhazia.

Air strikes by Abkhaz helicopters against rebel positions continued on October 16. By October 17, Abkhaz defense officials claimed that the lower valley had returned to their control, while Georgian authorities reported ten Russian Su-25 jets violating their airspace near Mestia. Continued bombing allegedly took place on the 29th; On October 30, a political crisis emerged in Tbilisi following a raid on a television station Rustavi-2, which nearly resulted in a coup against the government.

== Aftermath ==
The 2001 crisis received limited international media coverage, as global attention was largely dominated by the concurrent U.S. invasion of Afghanistan. In the immediate wake of the fighting, the political landscape in Georgia shifted toward a harder stance against the presence of Russian forces. In November 2001, President Shevardnadze proposed replacing the CIS peacekeepers—primarily composed of Russian troops—with a Turkish contingent. This sentiment was echoed in December 2001 by large-scale public demonstrations in Tbilisi, where protesters demanded the total withdrawal of Russian military personnel from the conflict zone.

Tensions remained high in the following years. By August 2002, Shevardnadze reported that Abkhaz fighters and approximately 100 Russian soldiers had re-entered the demilitarized upper gorge, leading to further skirmishes and Russian forces allegedly firing upon Georgian helicopters. The human cost of the 2001 crisis continued to be felt as late as 2004; Valery Chkhetiani, a Georgian fighter captured during the original raid and sentenced to 15 years in prison, died in an Abkhaz hospital on August 7, 2004, after suffering a stroke while in custody.

In 2006, Estonian advisor Mart Laar alleged that the 2001 crisis had been a Russian-engineered provocation designed to destabilize the Georgian state. This period of instability served as a direct precursor to the Russo-Georgian War of 2008. In April 2008, Russia accused Georgia of massing 1,500 troops in the Kodori region for an imminent invasion, a claim Georgia denied, asserting the forces were necessary to maintain local order. Russia subsequently deployed its own paratroopers to the region, which would eventually become a key front during the full-scale conflict later that year.

== See also ==
- Pankisi gorge
  - Pankisi Gorge crisis
