= 2006 Kodori crisis =

2006 military conflict between Georgia and Abkhazia

2006 Kodori Crisis
- Part of Abkhaz–Georgian conflict
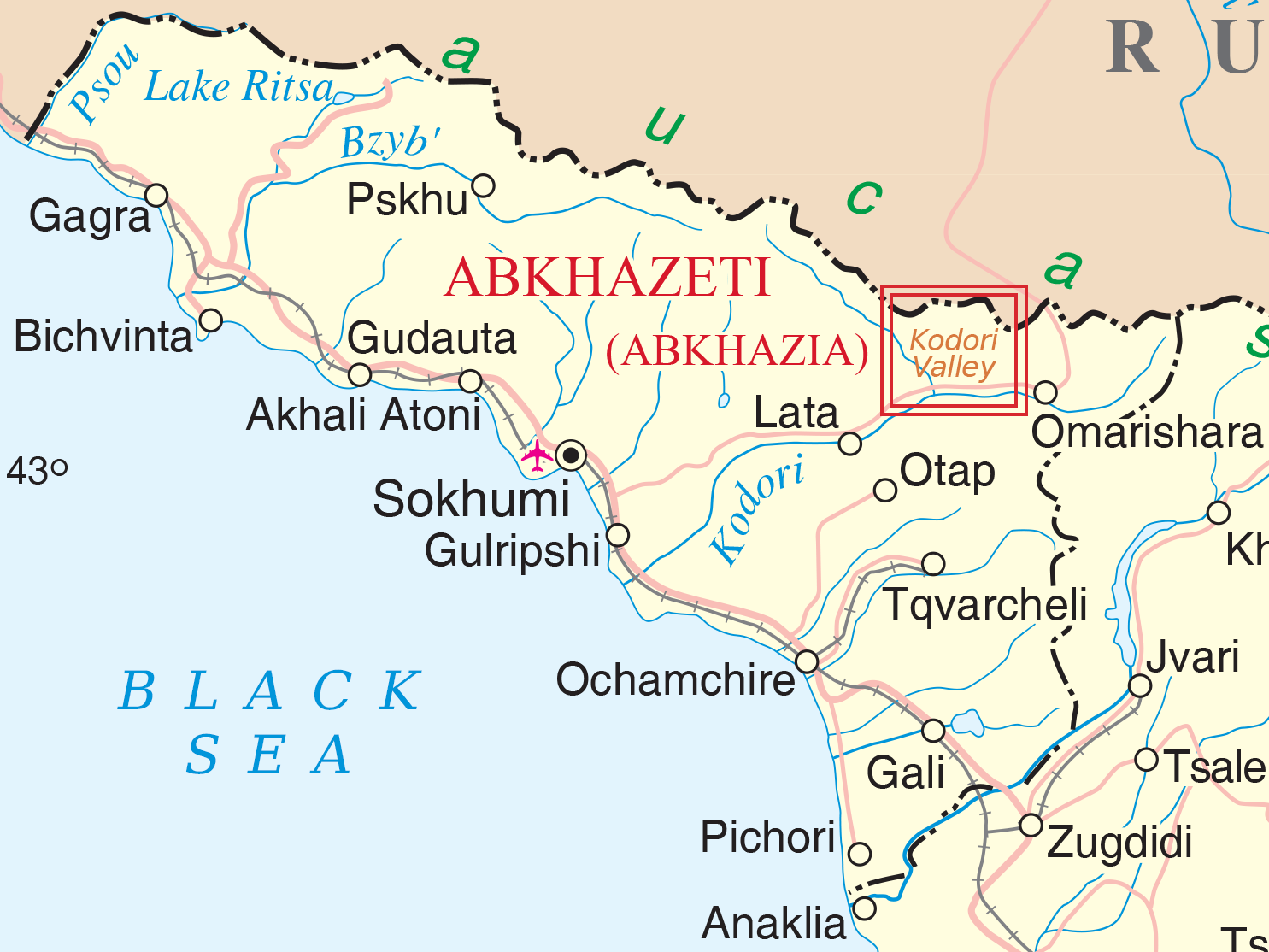
Date	July 22–28, 2006
Location	Kodori Gorge, Autonomous Republic of Abkhazia, Georgia
Result	Georgian Government Victory

Belligerents
(Georgia (country)) Georgia; Interior Ministry of Georgia; Police of Georgia	(Georgia (country)) Monadire

Commanders and leaders
Vano Merabishvili	Emzar Kvitsiani

Casualties and losses
- 1 civilian killed 2 MIA special forces officers wounded

The 2006 Kodori crisis erupted in late July 2006 in Abkhazia's Kodori Gorge, when a local militia leader declared his opposition to the Government of Georgia, which sent police forces to disarm the rebels. The upper part of the Kodori Gorge was at that time the only portion of Abkhazia, Georgia's breakaway republic, not controlled by the Abkhaz authorities.

== Background ==
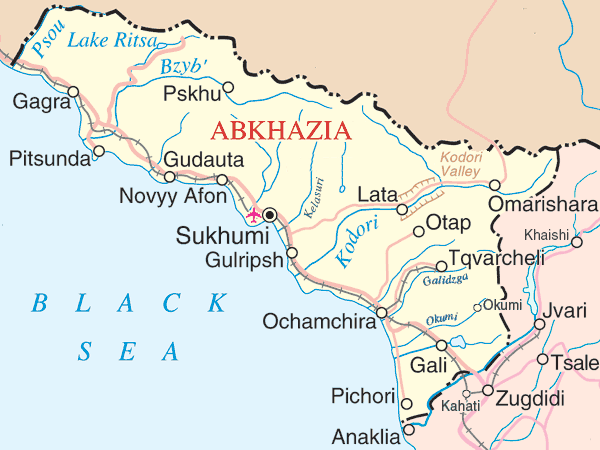
Map of Abkhazia showing the location of the Kodori Gorge

The Kodori Gorge, with its forested landscapes and rocky hills, lies in the Greater Caucasus mountains, in the northeastern corner of Abkhazia. In spite of several Abkhaz attempts to gain hold of this strategic gorge inhabited by the Svans, a local subgroup of the Georgian people, the upper part of the gorge had never been under the control of the secessionists since the Abkhazian war. It remained under precarious control of the central Georgian government, but the government of the area was effectively been run, until the 2006 crisis, by a local authority and warlord Emzar Kvitsiani, who previously led the defense of the gorge against the Abkhaz separatist forces in the capacity of the commander of the local Monadire (literally: "Hunter") militia force and an envoy of the former President of Georgia named Eduard Shevardnadze. After the ouster of Shevardnadze in the bloodless Rose Revolution in 2003, the new Georgian government disbanded the Monadire force and abolished Kvitsiani's post. There were also strong suspicions about Kvitsiani's involvement in smuggling and other criminal activities like providing shelter to several criminal authorities, wanted by Georgian police.

== July 2006 crisis ==
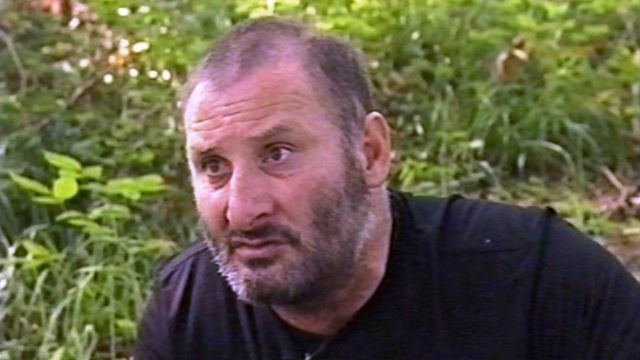
Emzar Kvitsiani, Georgian warlord

The crisis started on July 22, 2006, when Kvitsiani rearmed his former militiamen and said that he defied Georgia's central authorities and would resist any attempt by the authorities to disarm his militia groups. Attempts to negotiate a surrender went in vain and the militiamen declined an ultimatum sent by the Georgian Interior Minister Vano Merabishvili. On July 25, the government of Georgia dispatched a strong detachment of police and security forces to disarm the defiant paramilitary leader. Information coming from the gorge had largely been scarce and unconfirmed as the officials initially refused to make any comment. Later on July 25, Alexandre Lomaia, the Minister of Education and Science, confirmed that the planned police operation was underway with the aim to restore constitutional order in the Kodori area. According to Georgian television station Rustavi 2, the rebels were supplied with food and munitions by the Abkhazian military and the Russian peacekeeping forces stationed in Abkhazia. Rustavi 2 also reported that a helicopter of the Russian peacekeepers landed in the rebel-controlled area to provide the rebels with food, but failed to fly back as the Georgians threatened to down it.

According to official accounts, Georgian government forces controlled most of the gorge as of late July 26, forcing the surrender of a number of rebels. Others, including Kvitsiani, hide out in the surrounding forests. Several wounded and injured were reported on both sides. The death of a civilian in a shootout between the rebels and police was also confirmed. On July 27, Georgian Defense Minister Irakli Okruashvili said in a televised interview that the main phase of the operation had been successfully completed, as most of the rebels had either surrendered or been captured. He also said that the revolt "was a provocation planned in a foreign country."

By the end of July 28, all villages in the gorge were controlled by the government forces. A large number of weapons and munitions were also discovered in the gorge. Kvitsiani, according to Georgian claims, managed to escape to Sukhumi, the capital of Abkhazia.

== Reactions ==
With the start of the Georgian police operation, the Russian and de facto Abkhaz authorities expressed their concerns about the presence of the Georgian forces in the immediate neighbourhood of the conflict zone. The Abkhazian leadership assessed any infiltration of the Kodori Gorge by Georgia's armed units as a gross violation of the agreement on the ceasefire and disengagement of forces of May 14, 1994, and of the May protocol of 1998, according to which the Georgian side had assumed the obligation not to dispatch military forces in the gorge. Both Russian and Abkhaz officials warned on July 25 and July 26 that the use of force in Kodori could lead to a new conflict in the region. Sergei Bagapsh, the President of Abkhazia, made the following comments during the crisis in the Kodori Gorge: "If Georgian soldiers cross the border of Abkhazia, a new conflict may be launched, because Abkhazian soldiers will open fire in that case."

The Georgian authorities denied the accusations, saying that the only force operating in the gorge are police and security services, and therefore they were not a violation of the previous ceasefire protocols. They denied the allegations that the Georgian forces were planning to continue their way into the secessionist-controlled territories, reiterating that Georgia plans to resolve the separatist conflicts through peaceful means. On July 26, Jaap de Hoop Scheffer, Secretary General of NATO, on his meeting with the Georgian premier, Zurab Noghaideli, also expressed his support to Georgia's stance to the problems in Abkhazia and its fellow breakaway republic of South Ossetia.

== See also ==
- 2004 Adjara crisis
