= United Nations Observer Mission in Georgia =

United Nations peacekeeping operation in Georgia from 1993 to 2009

- Abbreviation: UNOMIG
- Formation: 24 August 1993
- Dissolved: 15 June 2009
- Type: Mission
- Legal status: Completed
- Parent organization: United Nations Security Council
- Website: "UNOMIG". peacekeeping.un.org. United Nations. 14 February 2026. Archived from the original on 14 February 2026.

The United Nations Observer Mission in Georgia (UNOMIG) was established by United Nations Security Council Resolution 858 on 24 August 1993 to verify compliance with a 27 July 1993 ceasefire agreement between the Republic of Georgia and forces in Abkhazia with special attention given to the situation in the city of Sukhumi, Georgia. It was also to investigate reports of ceasefire violations, attempt to resolve such incidents with the parties involved, and to report to the Secretary-General of the United Nations on the implementation of its mandate. 88 military advisors were authorized to be deployed to the region. It ended on 15 June 2009, when Russia vetoed an extension of the mission. The last observers left the region on 15 July 2009.

The mission's original mandate was invalidated after renewed fighting broke out in the area in September 1993.

UNOMIG was subsequently given an interim mandate by Security Council in November 1993 to maintain contacts with the parties involved and to monitor and report on the situation. It aimed to work towards achieving a comprehensive political settlement.

In May 1994, both sides signed the Agreement on a Cease-fire and Separation of Forces. in July 1994 the Security Council authorized an increase in observers (to a total of 136) and an expanded mission.

The new mission was considerably more broad than the original. UNOMIG's original responsibilities in verifying the implementation of the ceasefire were retained. However, UNOMIG was now responsible for observing the operation of the new peacekeeping force that had been deployed by the Commonwealth of Independent States. They were also to verify, through observation and patrolling, that troops from either side did not remain in or re-enter the security zone, and that heavy military equipment did not remain or be re-introduced.

UNOMIG was to oversee the withdrawal of Georgian troops from the Kodori Valley and thus, out of Abkhaz territory. Their patrols replaced those of Georgia in the valley. They were responsible for investigating, at the request of either party or the peacekeeping force, or on their own initiative, violations of the ceasefire agreement, and for attempting to resolve resulting disputes. Finally, they were to work towards making conditions safe for the orderly return of refugees and displaced persons.

On 10 December 1996, a United Nations office for the protection of human rights in Abkhazia was established in Tbilisi, Georgia, in accordance with Security Council Resolution 1077 of 22 October. It is jointly staffed by the Office of the High Commissioner for Human Rights (OHCHR) and the Organization for Security and Cooperation in Europe (OSCE). The office forms part of UNOMIG and reports to the United Nations High Commissioner for Human Rights, through the Head of the UNOMIG Mission. Though they maintain a political office in Tbilisi, their military headquarters are in Sukhumi, Abkhazia.

On 8 October 2001 a UNOMIG helicopter was shot down in Abkhazia. All nine passengers were killed. The perpetrators have never been found, despite repeated demands from the Security Council.

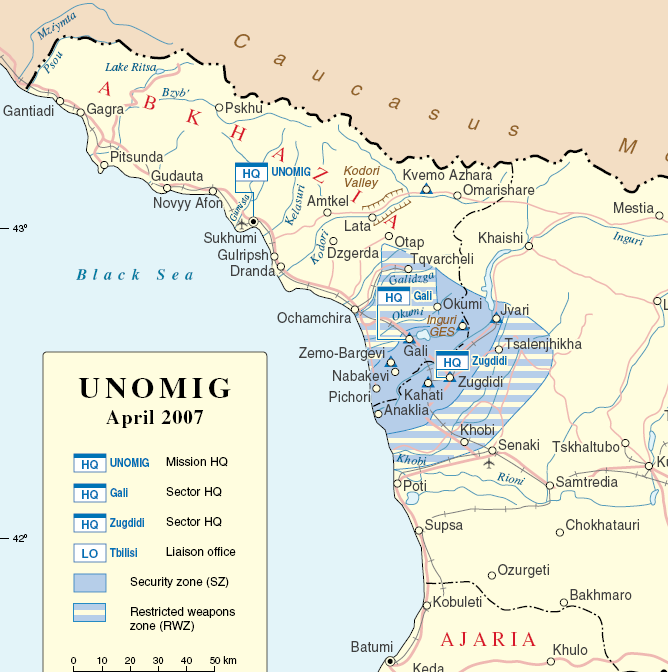
Map showing security zone

The Security Council passed another resolution on 30 July 2003, on the recommendation of Secretary-General Kofi Annan, authorizing for a civilian police component of 20 officers be added to UNOMIG, in order to strengthen its capacity to carry out its mandate and assist in the return of refugees and internally displaced persons.

On 30 January 2004, again at the request of Secretary-General Annan, Security Council Resolution 1524 was passed, which extended UNOMIG's mandate until 31 July 2004.

UNOMIG was concerned with security, assisting the return of the displaced and repairs of key infrastructure, such as roads and bridges. As of January 2003, 21 projects were at an advanced or intermediate stage and 10 others were awaiting the release of funds by donors. They also continued to push for a political settlement to the conflict, though Secretary-General Annan complained about the slow rate of progress. In late 2003, UNOMIG became concerned about an increase in kidnappings, murders and robberies, particularly in the Gori region.

The last chief military observer was Major General Anwar Hussain from Bangladesh. The strength of UNOMIG on 20 September 2008 stood at 134 military observers (including 12 medical personnel) and 17 police advisers.

In the mission the next vehicles were used during the patrols by the unarmed military observes: Toyota 4Runner, Nissan Patrol (now instead of the Toyota 4Runner), NYALA RG-31 [mine protected vehicle, along the cease-fire line (CFL) and at the training areas]. The Nissan Patrol was used mainly in the Restricted Weapon Zone (RWZ) and in the Security Zone (SZ) of the mission. In every patrol there were 2 vehicles with 4 unarmed military observers and one interpreter. The patrols were always in radio connection with the sector [Gali Sector HQ (in Abkhazia) or Zugdidi Sector HQ (in Georgia); and Sukhumi HQ (in Abkhazia)]. There were radio devices for every observers and in the vehicles because of the safety. Along the cease-fire line (CFL) there were a lot of Security Posts (SP) and Observing Posts (OP) both of the sides.

In the patrolling team only one person could be from one nation during the patrol. For example: 4 unarmed military observers were on the patrol from the next nations: Hungary, Indonesia, Germany, Argentina.

Following the Russian invasion of Georgia, the mission concluded in 2009 because of a Russian veto in the United Nations Security Council. As a result of the Russian veto, UNOMIG which had been active in the region since 1993, and had 150 personnel on the ground at the time of the veto, made up of 131 military observers and 20 police officers, saw its mandate expire on 16 June 2009 at 4 am GMT.
