= Kodori Valley =

Valley in Abkhasia

- Georgian: კოდორის ხეობა, Abkhaz: Кәыдырҭа
- Location within Caucasus Mountains Location within Georgia Location within Abkhazia

Geography
- Internationally recognised country: Georgia
- Partially recognised state: Abkhazia
- Coordinates: 43.1°N 41.8°E
- Interactive map of Kodori Valley

The Kodori Valley, also known as the Kodori Gorge (Georgian: კოდორის ხეობა, Abkhaz: Кәыдырҭа, romanized: Kwydyrta), is a river valley in Abkhazia, a partially recognised state in the South Caucasus. The valley's upper part, populated by Svans, was the only corner of the post-1993 Abkhazia directly controlled by the central Georgian government, which since 2006 officially styles the area as Upper Abkhazia (Geo. ზემო აფხაზეთი, Zemo Apkhazeti). On August 12, 2008, Russo–Abkhazian forces gained control of the Upper Kodori Valley, previously controlled by Georgia.

== Description ==
Map of Upper Abkhazia including Kodori Valley

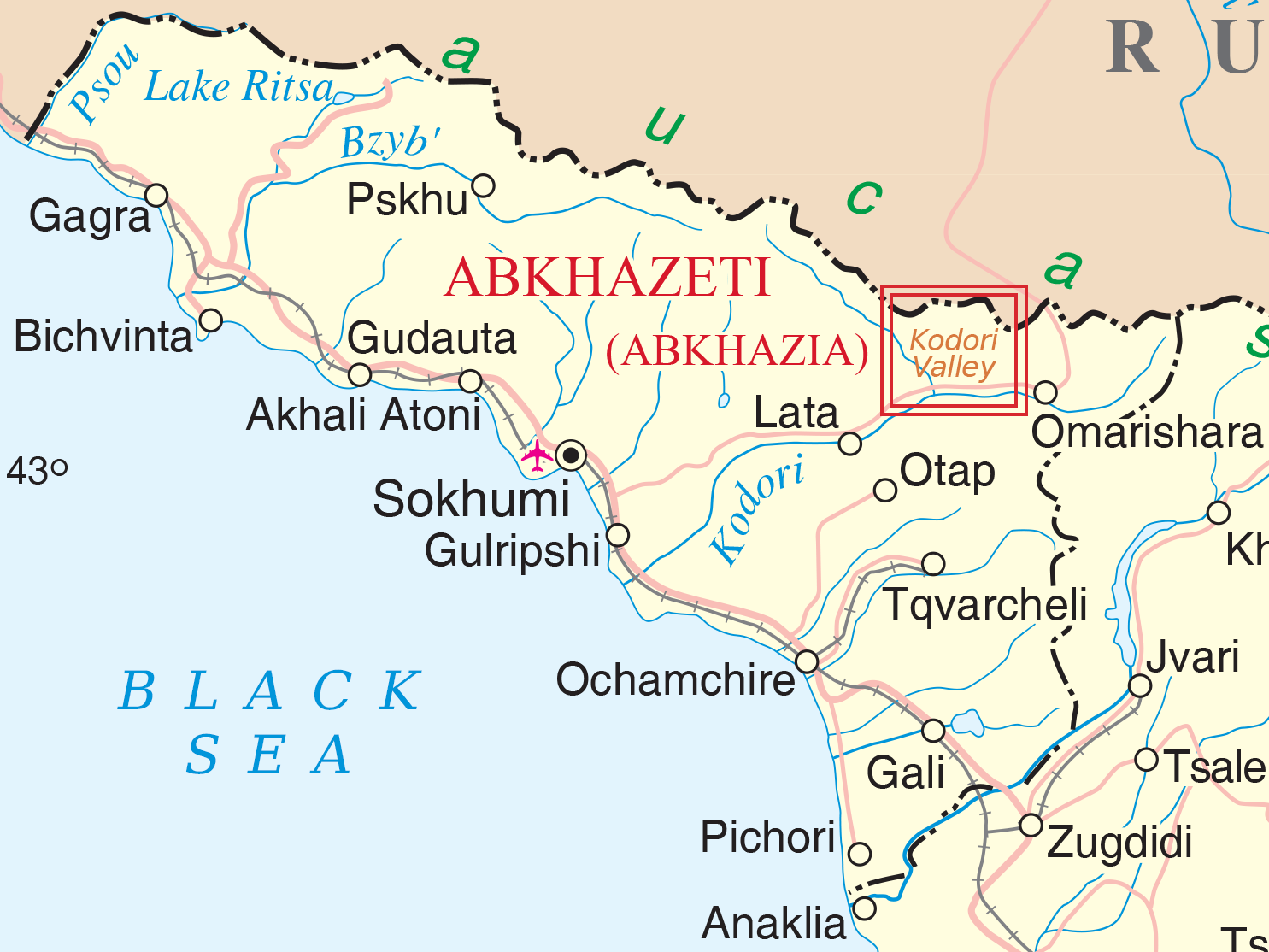
Map of Abkhazia showing the location of the Upper Kodori Valley

The Upper Kodori Valley lies in the upper reaches of the Kodori River in northeastern Abkhazia, about 65 km (40 miles) inside an official administrative boundary of the region with the rest of Georgia. It is about 30 km (20 miles) down the coast from Abkhazia's capital Sukhumi. At an elevation of 1,300 to 3,984 m (4,265 to 13,071 ft), the area covers a range of landscapes from coniferous mountain forest to intermittent snow cover.

The climate is alpine and winters are snowy. Annual precipitation 1,600 to over 2,000 mm (120 mm in January, 160 mm in April, 180 mm in July and 160 mm in October). Over 30 days with heavy rains per year. Around 180 days with snow cover. Mean temperature: January: -3 C, April: 3 C, July: 14 C and October: 5 C. Mean maximum temperature in July: 28 C.

The valley is populated by several upland villages; these are Lata, Omarishara, Shkhara and Zemo Azhara. Administratively, it was de facto and de jure a part of Upper Abkhazia (prior to August 2008), but the Republic of Abkhazia claims it as part of the Gulripshi District. According to the last Georgian census (2002), the population of the former Georgian-controlled part of the valley was 1,956, of which were 1,912 ethnic Georgians (Svans).

The population of the Upper Kodori Valley in 2011 was 196, mostly ethnic Georgians (Svans).

== History ==
The Abkhazian historic regions of Dal and Tsebelda occupied most of the Kodori Valley before the incorporation of Abkhazia into Russian Empire from 1810 to 1864. Its highland communities were independent of the central authority of Shervashidze-Chachba princes. In the 1840s, Imperial Russian soldiers started a series of massacres and ethnic cleansing. In January 1841, Russian troops massacred the Svan and Georgian populations in Kodori valley, specifically in the village of Dali. It is estimated that 90 Svan surnames went extinct as families were killed and few deported. As a result, the ethnic cleansing continued until the late 19th century, in 1866 the uprising of almost all the Abkhaz of these lands became muhajirs and the now depopulated territory of the former District of Tsebelda was placed under a special "settlement curator." Armenians, Georgians (Megrelians) and Russians populated the lower part of the valley, while Svans settled in its upper part (beyond the village of Lata).

== Recent history ==
Despite the war in Abkhazia ending by September 1993, the battles continued in the Kodori region up to the late March 1994. The village of Lata was taken by Abkhazian forces on March 24 and 25, 1994. According to the Moscow Agreement, signed in May 1994, the ceasefire line was drawn to the north-east of it so, so that the Upper Kodori Valley would remain outside of the control of Abkhazian authorities. Together with the Gali district, it is one of the two areas that remain populated by Georgians in the post-war Abkhazia.

Under UMOMIG's (United Nations Observer Mission in Georgia) expanded mandate laid out in Resolution 937 (1994), the mission was given two tasks in the Kodori Valley:

1. Monitor the withdrawal of troops of Georgia from the Kodori Valley to places beyond the boundaries of Abkhazia.
2. Patrol the Kodori Valley regularly.

Despite no subsequent real military activity in the Kodori corridor, several dangerous incidents occurred:

- Hostages: Three hostage-taking incidents involving UNMOs have occurred in the Kodori Valley: In October 1999, June 2000 and December 2000. In each case the hostages were released.
- Kodori Valley helicopter attack: On October 8, 2001, a UNOMIG helicopter was shot down by unknown attackers, killing all nine aboard.
- 2001 Kodori crisis: In the fall of 2001 a group of Chechen fighters, led by the commander Ruslan Gelayev, entered the gorge from the Georgian side, causing a major flare-up in Georgian-Abkhazian relations. The Russian air force carried out air strikes on the fighters. A group of fighters was intercepted by Abkhaz forces near Ilori and by October 18 the lower part of the valley was under the control of Abkhazia according to its Defence Minister. According to the local authorities, around 15% of the population fled their homes and sought refugee status in Tbilisi. Georgia responded by moving troops into the area, a step condemned by Abkhazia and the UN.
- Russian military incident: On April 2, 2002, Georgian and Abkhazian sides signed a demilitarization agreement for Kodori Gorge. UNOMIG-monitored withdrawal of 350 Georgian troops ended on April 10, however, 100 Russian ground forces entered the Kodori Gorge, without having any peacekeeping mandate, on the morning of April 12. They were soon surrounded by the Georgian Defence Ministry forces. A likely armed conflict was prevented by President Eduard Shevardnadze, going to Kodori to bring the situation under control. The UN representatives in the Georgian-Abkhaz conflict theater also condemned the Russian action. On April 14, a Russian military unit left the gorge.
- In 2003 UNOMIG ceased the monitoring operation following a hostage-taking incident.
- 2006 Kodori crisis: In July 2006, Georgia sent the Interior Ministry special forces to disarm the local paramilitary leader, Emzar Kvitsiani. With the restoration of the Georgian jurisdiction in the area, the President of Georgia ordered the Tbilisi-based Government of Abkhazia-in-exile to relocate to the gorge which would function as a temporary administrative center of breakaway Abkhazia. For this purpose, a major rehabilitation project was launched by the Georgian government, to adjust the valley's infrastructure to its new political function. Georgia offered the UNOMIG to monitor the upper part of the gorge simultaneously with the Separatist-controlled Lower Kodori Valley, but refused to allow the Russian peacekeeping forces to participate in the monitoring operation. Later Georgia allowed Russian peacekeepers to take part in the process.
- In 2006 the UNOMIG issued 13 violation notices to Georgia for moving troops and arms into the security zone as well as for obstructing the movement of UN observers contrary to the stipulations of the 1994 Moscow Agreement. In the same period the Abkhazian side received two violation notices for obstructing the movement of UN observers.
- A joint patrol of the UN observers and Russian peacekeepers found the presence of 550 personnel from the Upper Kodori Gorge as a result of monitoring, carried out on October 12, 2006. They agreed that the presence of police forces in Upper Kodori Gorge is technically not a violation of the 1994 Moscow ceasefire agreement which bans the deployment of army troops in the area. The UN Observer Mission in Georgia (UNOMIG) said on October 13 that monitoring had also revealed the presence of mortars and an anti-aircraft gun in the gorge which, according to the Georgian side, was seized from the local militia group in an operation carried out in late July.
- 2007 Georgia helicopter incident: On the night of March 11, 2007, three MI-24 attack helicopters bombarded the village of Chkhalta which served as the temporary headquarters of the Government of the Abkhazian Autonomous Republic. The government headquarters were damaged, but there were no injuries. Georgia accused Russia of carrying out the attack. Russia has officially denied carrying out the attack, however, a Russian official had stated that this was a "very clear signal" for Georgia.
- September 20, 2007, incident – The Georgian Ministry of Interior reported an armed clash with an Abkhaz subversive group which attempted to penetrate the Georgian-controlled area where the construction of a new road was underway. Two Abkhaz militiamen were killed, one wounded and six detained by the Georgian police unit. The Abkhaz leader, Sergei Bagapsh, had earlier warned that the de facto authorities reserved to themselves the right, to undertake measures at any time, to gain control of the Upper Kodori Valley. The same day, an armed clash between Russian peacekeepers and Abkhaz border guards left two dead.
- 2008 South Ossetia war – Soon after the start of the conflict, Abkhaz forces began the artillery bombardment of the Upper Kodori Gorge with the declared goal of pushing Georgian forces out of it. Georgian sources claimed Russian aircraft attacked Georgian-controlled villages in the valley. UNOMIG observers withdrew from the valley after Abkhazian authorities asked them to do so "for security reasons." On August 12, 2008, Abkhazian forces gained control of most of the Kodori Valley, previously controlled by Georgia.
