= 2008 Russo-Georgian diplomatic crisis =

2008 diplomatic crisis between Georgia and Russia

Though tensions had existed between Georgia and Russia for years and more intensively since the Rose Revolution, an international diplomatic crisis escalated in the spring of 2008, namely after Russia announced in response to the Western recognition of the independence of Kosovo that it would no longer participate in the Commonwealth of Independent States economic sanctions imposed on Abkhazia in 1996 and established direct relations with the separatist authorities in Abkhazia and South Ossetia. The crisis was also linked to the Georgian attempts to gain a NATO Membership Action Plan at the 2008 Bucharest Summit.

Until the end of June much of the conflict between Russia and Georgia was concentrated in Abkhazia, as were both Georgian and international efforts to negotiate a peace settlement. In early July the theater had moved to South Ossetia, where skirmishes between Ossetian militias and Georgian troops turned deadly on 3 July following the attempted assassination of pro-Georgian president of South Ossetia Dmitry Sanakoyev. The conflict led to a full-scale invasion of Georgia by Russia.

== Prelude to war: escalation and incidents ==
=== Increased involvement of Russia with breakaway republics in Georgia ===
On 14 February 2008, President of Russia Vladimir Putin declared that Russia had "homework" prepared in case of Kosovo's declaration of independence and would respond accordingly.

Chairman of the State Duma Boris Gryzlov declared during a meeting with the presidents of Abkhazia and South Ossetia in February 2008 that Russia should "reshape its relations with self-proclaimed republics". A session was called by Russia's Duma for 13 March to discuss the issue of recognition of the unrecognized republics in the former Soviet Union. Abkhazia and South Ossetia both submitted formal requests for recognition of their independence to Russia, and international community. Both cited the precedent of the recognition of Kosovo.

On 26 February 2008, Belgium and Germany asked at NATO Individual Partnership Action Plan summit if Georgia was acting in "conciliatory" manner towards the separatists in contrast to Eastern Europe's full support for granting Membership Action Plan to Georgia.

On 26 February 2008, the Georgian Foreign Ministry issued a note to Vyacheslav Kovalenko, Russian ambassador to Georgia, because the 2008 Russian presidential election would be held in Abkhazia and South Ossetia without Georgia's consent. The Russian presidential election was held in Abkhazia and South Ossetia in February 2008, long before the elections in Russia would be held, and the polling stations were opened in almost all settlements of South Ossetia. According to Shota Malashkhia, the member of the Georgian parliament, ethnic Georgian population in Abkhazia's Gali District was coerced to vote in the Russian elections.

On 1 March 2008, Russian General Vasily Lunev, former Deputy Commander of Siberian Military District, was appointed as defence minister of South Ossetia. After the August war, he suggested in an interview that he, as a military serviceman, obeyed the initiative of his superior to become the commander of the South Ossetian army.

On 6 March 2008, Russia cancelled Commonwealth of Independent States (CIS) sanctions imposed on Abkhazia in 1996, and declared them outdated. Georgia's central government in Tbilisi protested the Russian decision. The other CIS countries did not embrace cancellation of sanctions. Shalva Natelashvili, leader of the Georgian Labour Party, warned this Russian action would lead to the loss of Abkhazia for Georgia. Minister of Foreign Affairs of Slovenia Dimitrij Rupel said foreign ministers of the European Union were concerned by this development, while Swedish Foreign Minister Carl Bildt stated that Russian economic ties with Abkhazia could lead to de facto annexation which was alarming. European Commissioner for External Relations Benita Ferrero-Waldner said that there was "a growing preoccupation and anxiety that Russia may be paving the way for recognition of Abkhazia," and declared the EU's support for Georgia's territorial integrity.

On 10 March 2008, first deputy head of the Committee on International Affairs of the Russian State Duma Leonid Slutsky said that Abkhazia "must be encouraged, including by the lifting of restrictions" for the fulfillment of obligations for solving the conflict. On 11 March 2008, Georgian MPs were considering to demand 20 billion United States dollars from Moscow for damages incurred in Abkhazia.

Dmitry Rogozin, Russian ambassador to NATO, threatened that a move by Georgia to accede to NATO could increase the support for the recognition of the independence of Abkhazia and South Ossetia, arguing that exclusion of the separatist-controlled territories from the NATO referendum held in Georgia showed Georgia's intention to join NATO without them. Vice-speaker of Russian parliament Leonid Slutsky said that "no decisions will be taken" in the parliament hearings on 13 March 2008, since Russia supported Georgia's territorial integrity and "will not suddenly change its position and announce the opposite." Rogozin also said that Ukraine would also lose the eastern territories if it continued the pursuit of NATO membership. Vladimir Socor observed: "At worst, no MAP decision could tempt Russia into testing whether Georgia had become fair game."

On 13 March 2008, Deputy Speaker of the Parliament of South Ossetia Tarzan Kokoity declared that Abkhazia and South Ossetia would become independent in 2008. He stressed that Russia had already unofficially recognized Abkhazia and South Ossetia since long. On 13 March, the Duma Committee for CIS, following a hearing on the unrecognized republics, recommended on a deepening of links with Abkhazia, South Ossetia and Transnistria. Other recommendations included the establishment of diplomatic missions in the regions (with the foreign ministry to choose whether they would be consulates or another type of mission), a removal of import duties on goods created by businesses with Russian co-owners in the regions, and increased humanitarian and economic aid for the residents owning Russian passports. The Nezavisimaya Gazeta daily described the hearing as "the launch of a procedure of recognition."

On 21 March 2008, Russian State Duma adopted a resolution, in which it called on the President of Russia and the government to consider the recognition of Abkhazia and South Ossetia. Alexey Ostrovsky, Chairman of the State Duma Committee for CIS Affairs and Relations with Compatriots, said that NATO could not accept Georgia until Georgia settled its territorial disputes. Ostrovsky suggested in April that the Russian government had the right to recognize Abkhazia and South Ossetia if Georgia's NATO membership was "forced".

On 1 April 2008, during his visit to Kyiv, President of the United States George W. Bush expressed his support for Georgia's and Ukraine's accession to NATO. Bush planned to meet Russian president Putin on 6 April in Sochi. On 3 April 2008, the heads of state of Abkhazia and South Ossetia received a letter from Russian president Putin at the same time when the NATO summit was being held in Bucharest. The letter called separatist leaders "presidents" and assured them of "practical, not declaratory" assistance from Russia. On 8 April, the Russian Ministry of Justice informed its Georgian colleagues in a letter that Russian links with the two breakaway regions would be bolstered. Journalist Petru Bogatu later wrote that after the Bucharest summit announced that the membership would be considered in December 2008, Russian diplomats and journalists attending the summit suggested that the war in the Caucasus before December was inevitable. Russian Foreign Minister Sergey Lavrov announced that Russia would "do everything" to prevent Georgia's and Ukraine's NATO membership. Chief of the General Staff of the Russian Armed Forces Yuri Baluyevsky said on 11 April that Russia would carry out "steps of a different nature" in addition to military action to block NATO membership of former Soviet republics. Baluyevsky's statement was not seen as accidental by Russian media because he had never been known for making unsanctioned statements. Members of the Georgian parliament saw Baluyevsky's statement as a threat of Russian military incursion into Georgia. Secretary-General of the Collective Security Treaty Organization (ODKB) Nikolay Bordyuzha said that ODKB would respond to NATO's enlargement. First Deputy Prime Minister of Russia Sergei Ivanov suggested that Russian industrial enterprises and the economy of Russia could be refocused on the needs of the war. On 15 May, Yuri Baluyevsky urged the NATO at a session of NATO–Russia Council to stop arming Georgia. He said: "I do not exclude the possibility of a military conflict in Georgia."

Nezavisimaya Gazeta reported on 14 April that soon-to-be announced steps against NATO expansion included the establishment of direct official contacts with separatist authorities and a presidential decree had been prepared to this effect. Konstantin Zatulin, Deputy Chairman of the State Duma Committee on CIS Affairs and Relations with Russian Compatriots, said that the recognition should be postponed to December 2008 to avoid the sharp escalation with the West in the beginning of the presidential term of Dmitry Medvedev. However, he also said, "Now our steps towards the unrecognized republics will meet with understanding in the world as a response to the US recognition of Kosovo. If we do not solve the problem now, then it will remind of itself closer to the Olympics." Russian expert on the Caucasus was concerned by the possible failure of the Georgian opposition: "If the decree is issued before the parliamentary elections in Georgia, this will have an extremely negative impact on the chances of the opposition to win." Anonymous Russian diplomat, who had worked in Georgia, said that direct Russian military presence in Abkhazia and South Ossetia would prevent Georgia's NATO membership. An anonymous Russian diplomat's words were interpreted as suggesting that de facto annexation was intended by the draft decree.

On 15 April 2008, the embassy of South Ossetia was opened in Sukhumi, Abkhazia.

On 16 April 2008, Vladimir Putin announced that some separatist-authored documents would be accepted by Russia. He said there would be partnership between Russia and separatists in some areas, also ordering his government to recognise entities registered under Abkhaz and South Ossetian laws. The possibility of consular assistance for the populations of Abkhazia and South Ossetia would be considered. This decision was linked to the push for Georgia to receive a NATO Membership Action Plan and, indirectly, the unilateral declaration of independence by Kosovo. United States Department of State official Sean McCormack said the US were studying Putin's order and the statements of the Russian Foreign Ministry. Minister for Foreign Affairs of Abkhazia Sergei Shamba said that Abkhazia was very close to the recognition. Minister of Foreign Affairs of South Ossetia Murat Jioev commented: "This is the actual implementation of all methods that the President of the Russian Federation mentioned, saying that they would not repeat the Kosovo option, and Russia has its own preparations." Russian ambassador to Georgia Vyacheslav Kovalenko said that there was no conflict between Georgia and Russia regarding Abkhazia and South Ossetia. President of South Ossetia Eduard Kokoity approved Putin's decision, saying that it was "the only right solution to save the lives of Russian citizens." Rallies were held in Abkhazia on 6 May to thank Vladimir Putin for his support for Abkhazia.

Minister of Foreign Affairs of Georgia David Bakradze said Russian decree to establish ties with the separatis regions was a "legalisation of the de facto annexation process" and Secretary General of NATO Jaap de Hoop Scheffer urged Russia to annul the move. Swedish foreign minister Carl Bildt said: "Georgia's territorial integrity contributes to the stability of the wider Caucasus region." He also noted that Putin's decree followed Georgian's announcement of a new peace plan on Abkhazia. 25 members of the Parliamentary Assembly of the Council of Europe issued a declaration stating that Russian peacekeepers were "not neutral but are a party to the conflicts" and the United Nations forces should be deployed in their stead. The European Union issued a statement expressing concern and calling on Russia "not to implement" the decision to establish ties with the breakaway regions. On 18 April 2008, United States Secretary of State Condoleezza Rice expressed her concerns over Putin's decree with her Russian counterpart Sergey Lavrov during their phone talk held at her initiative. US presidential candidate John McCain said that Russia's aim was "de facto annexation". Ukraine, President of Lithuania Valdas Adamkus, Chairman of the OSCE Alexander Stubb, US envoy to the OSCE Julie Finley, Special Representative of the United Kingdom Brian Fall and members of the European Parliament also condemned the Russian move. Direct contacts between Russia and Abkhazia on the relocation of Russian citizens from Abkhaz jails raised concern from Secretary General of the Council of Europe Terry Davis since the dealings were done without seeking the permission of the Georgian government.

On 22 April 2008, Vadim Gustov, member of the Federation Council of Russia, said that the Federation Council would not adopt a resolution recognizing Abkhazia and South Ossetia because the Russian peacekeeping mandate would be terminated. The next day, the Federation Council postponed the consideration of the recognition.

The 110th United States Congress passed a resolution on 6 May that said the recent Russian actions were "provocative" and Russia "impedes reconciliation between those regions and the government of the Republic of Georgia". On 8 May 2008, Assistant Secretary of State for European and Eurasian Affairs Daniel Fried stated at the Congress: "While we have urged restraint on Georgia, there is a difference between a very small vulnerable country and a very large country that we have to keep in mind." In May 2008, Deputy Assistant Secretary of State for European and Eurasian Affairs Matthew Bryza said that Russia's "provocative actions" was seen "as working against cause of peaceful settlement" of the Georgian-Abkhaz issue. On 12 May, the Russian Foreign Ministry denounced Bryza's statement. Robert Parsons suggested on 13 May that Russia was provoking Georgia "into hasty action." He concluded, "a war between Georgia and Russia would be a disaster. Yet it is a measure of Russia's ambition, and of western diffidence, that such an outcome is becoming conceivable."

Russia's state-owned Gazprom was reported to be planning oil and gas survey in Abkhazia beginning 1 July 2008. In addition, Abkhazia said international airline flights from Russia could use Sukhumi airport though the International Civil Aviation Organization had said such flights would be inadmissible. Officials from Gazprom said Gazprom did not plan oil exploration in Abkhazia, but did say there was a proposal being considered to build a gas pipeline to Abkhazia. Responding to Russian media reports that sea links between Sochi in Russia and Gagra in Abkhazia would be resumed, Georgia threatened to complain to international marine organizations over the use of "illegal" routes.

=== Georgia drone-downing incidents ===
On 20 April 2008, a Georgian unarmed unmanned aerial vehicle (UAV) was shot down over the Abkhaz conflict zone. Georgia alleged that a MiG-29 Fulcrum fighter, from the Gudauta military base, was responsible for the attack; however, this allegation was dismissed by Russian Air Force. Georgia had earlier denied Abkhaz separatist claim of having shot down the drone at 06:00 GMT. Abkhazia said that they were guarding their airspace and the downed drone was Hermes 450 from Israel. According to deputy defence minister of the Republic of Abkhazia Garry Kupalba, an "L-39 aircraft of the Abkhaz Air Force" destroyed the drone. Furthermore, the Russian Ministry of Foreign Affairs issued a statement accusing Georgia of violating the 1994 Moscow agreement and United Nations resolutions on Abkhazia by deploying without authorisation a UAV which also can be used for adjusting of fire.

However, the Ministry of Defense of Georgia made video footage captured by the drone public the next day. The video demonstrated the unarmed Georgian drone being attacked by supposedly Russian MiG-29 supposedly over the Black Sea. Russia denied that any Russian planes were flying in the area during the time of attack. On 21 April 2008, President of Georgia Mikheil Saakashvili called Russian president Putin by a phone and discussed recent developments in Russian-Georgian relations.

On 23 April 2008, a closed meeting of the United Nations Security Council was held in New York. Georgia had requested the meeting to be convened. Georgian foreign minister Davit Bakradze also attended the meeting. After the United Nations Security Council session, the United States, the United Kingdom, France, and Germany expressed their concern over Russia's actions in Abkhazia in a statement and urged Moscow not to enforce its decision to deepen ties with Abkhazia and South Ossetia. However, this was labeled as "a tall order" by Vitaly Churkin, Permanent Representative of Russia to the United Nations to the UN, who stressed that Russia would not annul its decision. NATO's Special Representative for the Caucasus and Central Asia Robert Simmons said that the NATO supported the statement of the US, UK, France and Germany on Russia and that NATO questioned "the role of Russia as a mediator in the settlement of the Abkhazian and South Ossetian conflicts".

An allegation of an attack by a NATO MiG-29 was made by the Russian Ambassador to NATO, Dmitry Rogozin. NATO Secretary General Jaap de Hoop Scheffer reportedly commented that "he'd eat his tie if it turned out that a NATO MiG-29 had magically appeared in Abkhazia and shot down a Georgian drone."

Early in May 2008, Russian and Abkhaz allegations that two more Georgian reconnaissance drones had been shot over Abkhazia were refuted by Georgia as "a provocation" intended to create "information-propagandistic support of Russia's military intervention." On 12 May 2008, the Abkhaz authorities reported to have shot down 7th Georgian drone, but Georgia rejected this.

On 26 May 2008, the United Nations Observer Mission in Georgia released the conclusion of its independent investigation into the 20 April incident. It confirmed that the Georgian video footage and radar data were authentic and the jet which destroyed the drone was indeed Russian. The conclusion report said that the jet flew towards the Russian territory after the incident, but it was unclear where the attacker took off, naming the Gudauta base as a possible locality. Georgia hailed the report, but Russia dismissed it.

Georgian drone overflights over Abkhazia had been officially halted in early June, but Abkhazia accused Georgia of continuing to fly drones in the region.

=== Military buildup in Abkhazia ===
On 17 April 2008, President of Abkhazia Sergei Bagapsh warned that Abkhazia would deploy its armed forces in Gali District, Abkhazia and the Kodori Valley if Georgia did not withdraw its armed forces from Zugdidi Municipality and the upper Kodori Valley.

On 26 April 2008, Valery Kenyaikin, Special Representative of the Russian Ministry of Foreign Affairs for the development of relations with the CIS countries, said that the conflict between Georgia and Russia could escalate into a military confrontation because Russia was ready to defend the interests of the Russian citizens in the breakaway regions. High-ranking European source told Nezavisimaya Gazeta that Russian escalation could force some European countries to change their position and support Georgia's accelerated membership of NATO. In response to Kenyaikin's statement, Georgian foreign minister David Bakradze was planning to appeal to NATO for help. Russian foreign ministry official said that Russian peacekeepers would not leave Abkhazia without Abkhazia's consent and they would only leave Georgia proper on the other side of Enguri river.

On 29 April, the Russian government said that Georgia was assembling 1,500 military troops and police in the upper Kodori Gorge area and was planning to attack Abkhazia. President Saakashvili, in his televised address, pledged to pursue only a peaceful line in the conflict areas and called upon the Abkhaz and Ossetians to unite with Georgia in defying attempts by "outrageous and irresponsible" external actor to provoke bloodshed. Russia announced it would boost its military in the region and Russian foreign minister Lavrov threatened to "retaliate" militarily against Georgia. Prime Minister of Georgia Lado Gurgenidze said Georgia would treat any additional troops in Abkhazia as aggressors. The European Union called on Russia to refrain from taking rash measures. Carl Bildt commented on the developments in Abkhazia that Russia was provoking the war in Georgia. The Georgian Foreign Ministry stated on 30 April that Russian armored vehicles, heavy artillery and additional military force had crossed the state border on the Psou River without Georgia's consent. NATO official James Appathurai said Russia "increased tensions and undermined Georgia's territorial integrity."

Russia's admission to the World Trade Organization (WTO) was suspended by Georgia on April 29.

On 29 April 2008, residents of Moscow noticed that new Russian tanks marched on Leningradsky Avenue and one of the tanks had the inscription "On Tbilisi". Russian blogger commented: "The war between Russia and Georgia is more real than ever." Russian Cossacks and North Caucasian volunteers declared their readiness to fight Georgia in the case of a renewed confrontation in Abkhazia. Ataman of Don Cossacks Viktor Vodolatsky declared on 30 April that Cossacks were ready to defend the population of Abkhazia, South Ossetia and Crimea. Movladi Udugov stated on 3 May that Emir of the Imarat Kavkaz Dokka Umarov had authorized the establishment of the special group for monitoring the Russo-Georgian tensions and the Russian military deployments in the North Caucasus and gathering of intelligence in Abkhazia and South Ossetia 2 months ago.

In early May, anonymous Russian official stated that Georgia had prepared a plan of the war against Abkhazia with help from foreign advisors and the foreign embassies were preparing to evacuate from Tbilisi. The Georgian foreign ministry ridiculed this assertion. Minister for Defence of Abkhazia said, "If they [Georgians] invade us, we need two days to defend ourselves, and after two days we will reach Kutaisi (West Georgia) ourselves, we have enough troops and equipment." On 6 May 2008, Georgian State Minister for Reintegration Temur Iakobashvili said Georgia was on the verge of war with Russia. Iakobashvili also said, "We know what the signals are when you see propaganda waged against Georgia." Abkhaz foreign minister Sergei Shamba said that Abkhazia was ready to grant military control of the territory between the Psou and the Enguri rivers to Russia. Alexey Ostrovsky, Chairman of the State Duma Committee for CIS Affairs and Relations with Compatriots, responded to Shamba's statement that Russia would not consider building the military bases in Abkhazia until the settlement of Abkhazia's status. The United States Department of State spokesman said that Russia's recent actions "have significantly and unnecessarily heightened tensions in the region, and run counter to Russia's status as a facilitator of the U.N. Friends process on Abkhazia." The United States Department of State demanded from Russia "to reconsider" "some provocative steps". The United States House of Representatives denounced Russia's "provocative and dangerous statements and actions". Georgian media was reporting in early May that Russia would aid its citizens in Abkhazia. Newspaper Rezonansi reported that Russia and Abkhaz separatists would launch an offensive against the Kodori Gorge.

According to the statement of the Russian Ministry of Defense issued on 8 May, the number of Russian peacekeepers deployed in Abkhazia was boosted to 2,542. But Russian troop levels remained under the cap of 3,000 troops imposed by a 1994 decision of CIS heads of state. UN Observer Mission in Georgia (UNOMIG) said that its monitors had not detected any buildup either at the administrative border of Abkhazia or in Kodori Gorge. Russian Ministry of Defense claimed that the chief UN observer "agreed that actions by the Russian side do not contradict basic agreements on the conduct of the peacekeeping operation". But the mission later countered that it "has no authority to pronounce on the conformity between the CIS peacekeeping operation in the Zone of the Georgian-Abkhaz Conflict and CIS rules." Sources in the Staff of the Russian Airborne Forces stated that a regular non-peacekeeping battalion of 400 heavily armed troops was sent to Abkhazia without Georgia's consent. On 12 May, Deputy Assistant Secretary of State for European and Eurasian Affairs Matthew Bryza, during his visit to Tbilisi, criticized Russian military deployment to Abkhazia: "In my entire career, I have never heard of artillery being used to keep the peace." On 18 May, Georgia demonstrated video footage captured by a drone to the BBC allegedly proving that Russian forces used heavy weaponry in Abkhazia and were combat troops, rather than peacekeepers; Russia denied the accusations.

On 11 May 2008, the pro-Georgian government of Abkhazia in-exile said that a detachment of paratroopers had arrived in Tkvarcheli in preparation for the storm of the Kodori Gorge and that they were commanded by the former chief of the staff of the CIS Collective Peacekeeping Forces. Georgian media reported that high-ranking Russian officers arrived in Sukhumi to "coordinate the actions of the Russian military in Abkhazia." It emerged on the internet that the Abkhaz forces and Russian generals had created a plan of the war with Georgia codenamed "Double Dbar - Double Attack", which intended not only the capture of the Kodori Gorge, but annexation of parts of western Georgia including Kutaisi. Russian forces would kill the Georgian residents of Gali district. However, if Georgia did not respond to this provocation militarily, then the Abkhaz post would be attacked by a group wearing NATO uniforms. This attack would be blamed on Georgia and Abkhazia would be recognized by Russia.

Russian military expert Alexander Golts wrote in early May 2008, "Nobody wants war, but both sides are doing everything to spark a military conflict." Georgian president Saakashvili said, "we were close to an armed conflict a few days ago, but now the tension has released a bit". Saakashvili asserted that he had been told by many Russian officials that it "has been decided not give up Abkhazia". Later, Russian military expert Pavel Felgenhauer wrote that Sergei Shamba's statement on the plan to carve out a "buffer zone" from Georgia probably suggested that Abkhazia intended to deport the residents of this area. According to Felgenhauer, although Georgia was being accused of preparing for the war, "there are no signs of combat arrangements in Georgia."

Separatist leader Sergei Bagapsh said he was in favor of Russia establishing a military base in Abkhazia and called for the signing of a military treaty with Russia similar to the Taiwan Relations Act. Alexander Zelin, commander of the Russian Air Forces, said if such a decision was made it would "promote the implementation of air defense tasks" and observed Russia had similar cooperation with Armenia. On 16 May 2008, Yuri Baluyevsky, chief of the Russian General Staff denied Russia had any plans to build a military base in Abkhazia.

On 15 May 2008, the Russian Defense Ministry published the information on military armaments given to Georgia by the West and claimed that "strengthening [Georgia’s] military capabilities serves as destabilizing role in military-political situation in the South Caucasus region." Georgian authorities said the information on the military equipment was "outdated".

On 18 May 2008, five Russian peacekeepers were arrested along the administrative border with Abkhazia; however, they were later freed. According to Georgia, their armoured personnel carrier hit a Georgian car in the town of Zugdidi; however, Alexander Diordiev, a Russian peacekeeping official, said there was no crash and instead that Georgians provoked the peacekeepers in an attempt to discredit the Russians. According to Diordiev, on the night of 17–18 May, the road near the village of Urta was closed for the peacekeepers who were moving hardware and then an already damaged car arrived. The Georgian police blamed car damage on the Russian peacekeepers and used the force against them. Diordiev stated that the Georgians knew in advance about the redeployment of the hardware. A statement by the Russian Foreign Ministry, issued on 19 May 2008, said the Georgians' actions were of "true street bandits", saying the Georgians used "crude physical force" against the peacekeepers. The Russian peacekeepers were freed due to the efforts of the Collective Forces for the Support of Peace command and the UN mission.

Nezavisimaya Gazeta reported on 19 May that Russian peacekeepers had recently been allowed to undertake military actions independently if necessary and Abkhaz foreign minister Sergei Shamba said this report was "credible."

On 21 May 2008, heavy gunfire was reported near the Abkhaz administrative border, with a Georgian interior ministry official saying two buses of passengers going to vote in the Georgian elections were attacked. Some reports said the bridge, connecting Abkhazia and Georgian region of Mingrelia, was closed by Abkhaz separatists during the elections in Georgia. Georgian officials accused Abkhazia of the attacks and preventing Georgians from voting in the legislative elections. Abkhaz president Sergei Bagapsh denied these allegations, instead saying that the attack occurred on the Georgian territory and Georgians living in Abkhazia were not interested in voting. According to Abkhazia, in order to avert tensions, Russian peacekeepers were deployed along the border.

The Georgian Foreign Ministry wrote a protest note to the CIS secretariat on May 21. Georgia requested illegal Russian troops and weaponry to be removed from Abkhazia, saying that the recent deployment of troops and military hardware (an airborne battalion, 50 BMD-2 airborne combat vehicles, and two artillery batteries) contradicted a 1995 resolution adopted by the CIS presidents' council.

On 9 June 2008, Georgian interior minister Vano Merabishvili commented on the statement of the Abkhaz authorities on the Kodori Gorge: "We do not want war, we are putting things in order on our territory." He explained that the Kodori Gorge was a criminal haven and Georgian authorities were forced to reestablish the control. He also said that Russia was ready to start the war in Abkhazia to prevent Georgia's NATO membership.

On 12 June 2008, American political scientist Zbigniew Brzezinski said that Russia was trying to gain control of the Baku–Tbilisi–Ceyhan pipeline by destabilizing the situation in Georgia.

On 15 June 2008, media reports said that a Russian military base had been established near the village of Agubedia in Abkhazia's Ochamchira District. According to reports, heavy weaponry had been sent there. The reports were denied by the Russian Defense Ministry. The Georgian-backed Abkhaz government-in-exile said on 17 June that Russia refused to allow UN monitors in the area.

On 17 June 2008, a Russian Foreign Ministry spokesman warned that Georgian attempt to revise the peacekeeping operation in the Georgian-Abkhaz conflict zone could "unfreeze" the conflict. According to him, due to this, the situation could "slip out of control" in the wider region.

On 17 June 2008, four Russian peacekeepers and a military truck were captured near the border between Georgia proper and Abkhazia. Georgia's Interior Ministry said that the peacekeepers were moving 35 crates of ammunition, thus violating the existing agreements, while the Russian Defense Ministry said the detention was "in violation of all regulatory norms in the buffer zone." According to the Georgian police, after nine hours of interrogation, the peacekeepers were released. Russian President Dmitry Medvedev told Georgian President Saakashvili by phone on 18 June that Russia would not tolerate "provocations" against Russian peacekeepers. Georgian Deputy Interior Minister Eka Zguladze said that seized armaments would not be returned to the peacekeepers since they "didn't present any legal documents related to the weapons, and the Georgian side wasn't informed about this." Lieutenant General Alexander Burutin, a deputy head of the Russian General Staff, compared the arrest to "a bandit attack" on 19 June, saying Russian peacekeepers had every right to use their weapons. Russian President Dmitry Medvedev said on June 21 that Russia would not tolerate such actions against peacekeepers.

A Russian military expert, Pavel Felgenhauer, commenting on the situation in the conflict zone on 19 June, predicted the war between Georgia and Abkhazia. Felgenhauer said on 20 June that Vladimir Putin had already decided to start a war against Georgia in Abkhazia and South Ossetia supposedly in late August 2008. Provocations against Georgia would begin in Upper Abkhazia and South Ossetia, then the war would spread to the rest of Georgia.

On 23 June 2008, Sergei Bagapsh said that he was going to close off the sea for Georgia.

On 24 June 2008, Russian peacekeepers established a curfew in the Gali district of Abkhazia and were in complete control of the car roads. Russian and Abkhaz forces were conducting a joint exercise near the Kodori Gorge.

On 26 June 2008, Russian president Dmitry Medvedev officially received Sergei Bagapsh as president of Abkhazia in Moscow. Georgian deputy foreign minister Grigol Vashadze expressed his concern over the meeting, saying that such actions were contrary to the resolutions of the UN Security Council. The Russian Foreign Ministry said they were surprised at the Georgian reaction.

On 29 June, there were two blasts in Gagra and six people were wounded. Abkhaz president Bagapsh accused Georgia of pursuing "a policy of state terrorism." According to the source of Gruziya Online, one Russian vacationer from Ural was killed in Gagra, but this was being covered up. On 30 June, there were two blasts in Sukhumi which wounded 6 people. Abkhaz authorities declared that similar explosive devices had been used in both Gagra and Sukhumi. Abkhaz president visited the location of the blasts in Sukhumi and announced closing of the border with Georgia.

=== May and June events in South Ossetia ===
Georgian foreign minister Eka Tkeshelashvili said on 15 May 2008 that deployment of additional Russian peacekeepers to South Ossetia would be seen by Georgia as a "gross encroachment on Georgia's sovereignty and territorial integrity". In late May 2008, there were about 1,000 Russian peacekeepers present in South Ossetia.

Three blasts were reported to have occurred in South Ossetia. In one of the blasts, there was a bomb explosion near Georgian police vehicle and one serviceman was wounded. The South Ossetian authorities were accused by Georgian Deputy Defense Minister Batu Kutelia of resorting to "tactics of terrorism."

On 20 May 2008, foreign ambassadors were asked by Taymuraz Mamsurov, president of the Russian Republic of North Ossetia, to help North Ossetia to unite with South Ossetia. Georgian Ambassador Erosi Kitsmarishvili said that international law would be violated by such merger. South Ossetian leader Eduard Kokoity approved Mamsurov's proposal, saying "South Ossetia's main goal is unification with North Ossetia in the Russian Federation." Kokoity and Dmitry Medoyev suggested an interim period where South Ossetia would be recognized as independent and then formally integrated into Russia through a referendum.

On the night of 14–15 June 2008, mortar fire and an exchange of fire broke out between South Ossetian and Georgian forces. One person was killed and four injured in the clashes, and several Georgian houses were reportedly damaged. South Ossetia's interior minister Mikhail Mindzaev claimed that their forces were responding to mortar fire launched from Georgian-controlled villages. He said that the crossfire lasted for about four hours while the commander of the Joint Peacekeeping Forces said that it lasted for about an hour and a half. Georgia refuted acting first and said that the Georgian-controlled villages of Ergneti, Nikozi and Prisi had been attacked by South Ossetia. A land mine wounded 14-year-old boy near Ergneti in another incident; he later died. According to South Ossetia, five people were injured during the violence and one of them died later.

The area of the clashes was visited by Russian, Georgian, and North Ossetian peacekeepers and Organization for Security and Co-operation in Europe observers. They came under fire near Ergneti, with no injuries. The fire exchange began on the night of 15 June at 11:38 PM and lasted for half an hour. Automatic firearms and grenade launchers were used.

Aleksandr Dugin, who was known for his strong ties with the Russian military and intelligence, visited South Ossetia in late June 2008. On 30 June, he said at a press conference:

"Russia has practically decided to recognize [Abkhazia and South Ossetia], and you have perfectly prepared everything for this. [...] The last formal hook of opponents of the recognition of South Ossetia is, perhaps, the lack of a project for the integration of Georgian enclaves inside South Ossetia. This card will be played many times, pressurizing and attacking Putin and Medvedev, that the unresolvedness of problem is a fundamental obstacle to the recognition of South Ossetia. [...] this is a pretext that can not be ignored. [...] If Russia recognizes independence of South Ossetia and deploys there not peacemaking but Russian border troops, the issue of Georgia joining NATO either will be removed from the agenda for a long time, or this will mean direct conflict with the United States. [...] So, we must recognize Abkhazia and South Ossetia before December."

The Eurasian Youth Union held a session in Tskhinvali on 30 June. The assembly adopted a resolution promising to send thousands of armed volunteers to South Ossetia and Abkhazia to defend the local population from genocide. The resolution supported the recognition of Abkhazia and South Ossetia and their accession to the Russian Federation.

On 30 June 2008, South Ossetian authorities accused Georgia of kidnapping a Russian citizen from Tskhinvali, who had arrived from Vladikavkaz to visit his relatives.

=== Russian spy accusation ===
On 16 May 2008, it was reported that Russia's Federal Security Service (FSB) claimed to have captured a Chechen spy. The spy had been operating in Georgia's interests and was aiding rebels in Southern Russia. The alleged agent was identified as Ramzan Turkoshvili, a Georgian-born Russian citizen. According to the unnamed FSB official, Georgian intelligence working with Zelimkhan Khangoshvili were responsible for drafting Turkoshvili. The detention was cast as proof that confirmed that Georgia was "participating in disruptive terrorist activities in the North Caucasus." The accusations were dismissed by Shota Utiashvili, the spokesman for Georgian Interior Ministry. Utiashvili labeled the claims as "a continuation of Russia's policy of provocation toward Georgia, which has taken a particularly acute form recently."

=== Russian railway troops in Abkhazia ===
On 31 May 2008, Russia deployed railroad troops to repair a rail line in Abkhazia. According to the Russian defence ministry, railroad troops were not armed. Georgia stated that the development was an "aggressive" act. Georgian deputy foreign minister Grigol Vashadze said, "Nobody needs to bring Railway Forces to the territory of another country, if a military intervention is not being prepared." The US Department of State also said that the Russian move "dismayed" them. Temur Mzhavia, chairman of the Supreme Council of Abkhazia in exile, said that Russia planned to recognize Abkhazia on 27 September, an "independence day" of Abkhazia, but Vyacheslav Kovalenko, Russian ambassador to Georgia, dismissed such claims as "fabrications".

The new Russian troops' arrival in Abkhazia preceded by a few days a planned meeting between the presidents Mikheil Saakashvili of Georgia and Dmitry Medvedev of Russia during a CIS summit in Saint Petersburg scheduled on 6–7 June. It was reported that Saakashvili would speak about this issue with Medvedev on 3 June by phone. On 3 June, NATO secretary general Jaap de Hoop Scheffer said that Russia violated sovereignty of Georgia and called for the removal of railway troops.

On 7 June 2008, the Russian defense minister Anatoliy Serdyukov said the railway troops would withdraw after they would have finished work on the railroad in two months. Russia claimed to have found an anti-tank mine on 13 June on the railway section which was being rehabilitated. Russia claimed that a "subversive-terrorist act" was attempted against the Russian Railway Forces.

On 18 June 2008, a Russian military official announced two explosions on the railroad near Sukhumi caused the security to be increased and Abkhaz police suspected the Russian railway forces were intended target of the bombings. Malkhaz Akishbaya, chairman of the Georgian-backed Abkhaz government in exile, claimed the explosion was a provocation to discredit Georgia and also aimed at legitimizing the presence of Russian railway troops.

On 23 June 2008, Sergei Bagapsh said construction material for a sports complex to be used in the 2014 Winter Olympics in Sochi, Russia, would be moved by the railroad rehabilitated by the Russian railway troops.

In early July 2008, Georgian political expert Mamuka Areshidze noted that the line between Sochi and Sukhumi was operational and the repair works mainly centered on the line leading to Ochamchira, where the former Soviet border base, very well-suited for the movement of troops into the Kodori Gorge, was located. Areshidze suggested that Abkhazia closed the border with Georgia to cover up the military preparations. On 21 July 2008, it was reported that repair of the 54 km (34 mi) railroad line between Sukhumi and Ochamchira had been finished. Earlier, Russian military official had said that the repair job was planned to be finished on August 6.

On 24 July 2008, the Russian Defense Ministry said renovation of the Abkhaz railway had been almost completed and there would be an opening ceremony at the end of July. After participating in the ceremony, the railway forces would return to Russia in early August. Russian railroad troops attended the inauguration ceremony of the railroad on 30 July 2008. Russian railroad forces began withdrawal from Abkhazia on 30 July 2008. Historically, when the Soviet Union was planning a new military offensive, railway troops were deployed to the future combat area in advance. Previous instance of the deployment of the railway troops was in Chechnya in 1999. The fixed railroad (Sukhumi-Ochamchira line) was used to transport military equipment by at least a part of the 9,000 Russian soldiers who entered Georgia from Abkhazia during the invasion in August 2008.

=== July 2008 events ===
==== July 1–2 ====
On 1 July 2008, the maritime traffic between Sochi and Gagra resumed.

On 2 July 2008, Russian peacekeepers in Abkhazia claimed that a car came up to the Russian checkpoint on the border with Georgia and threw an unidentified object which detonated, then the car turned back to Georgia and Georgian servicemen did not detain the car. There was a blast between the Georgian interior ministry post and the Russian peacekeeping post in South Ossetia at 20:00 MSK.

==== July 3–4 ====
On 3 July 2008, bombing killed a South Ossetian police official Nodar Bibilov in the village Dmenisi in the early morning. After several hours, a remote bomb targeted the car of Dmitry Sanakoyev, the leader of the pro-Georgian South Ossetian government. After the blast, fire was opened from the villages of Sarabuki and Kokhati and Sanakoev's bodyguards responded. Three bodyguards were wounded. Deputy defense minister of South Ossetia Ibrahim Gazseev claimed that the Georgian interior ministry units had taken the 300 meter height near the village Sarabuki. Around 20:10, the South Ossetian post in the village of Kokhati was fired upon. South Ossetia reported that interior ministry post near the village Ubiat was attacked from the Georgian-controlled Nuli. The attack killed one South Ossetian militiaman and wounded another. South Ossetia reported that Georgia started shelling Tskhinvali at around 23:40. Shelling of Tskhinvali resulted in the death of one man and the wounding of seven. By the morning of 4 July, the South Ossetians reported that Georgia's special military operation had resulted in the death of 3 people and wounding of 11. Georgian authorities said that South Ossetians were shelling Georgian-controlled villages Tamarasheni and Nikozi for 6 hours and this forced the Georgians to respond. Georgian chief of peacekeepers Mamuka Kurashvili said that at 6:00 in the morning of 4 July, South Ossetian separatists attempted to attack the Georgian post on the bypass road between Little Liakhvi and Great Liakhvi valleys.

South Ossetian military were mobilized in the morning of 4 July and peacekeeping forces were put on alert. South Ossetia warned its heavy weaponry would enter the conflict zone if attacks did not cease. Russian peacekeepers declared that 7 unidentified planes overflew Tskhinvali during the night. The chief of the Russian peacekeepers was quoted as saying that additional forces could be sent to South Ossetia in case of further deterioration. The Abkhazian Armed Forces were put on combat alert. Abkhaz leader Bagapsh threatened if Georgia did not stop attacking Tskhinvali, Abkhazia would not abandon South Ossetia in time of need and the war would spill to the entire Caucasus region. South Ossetian leader Eduard Kokoity called on the President of Russia to deploy the Russian forces to South Ossetia to defend the citizens of Russia. Kokoity said that Georgian peacekeepers were equal to the aggressors. Russia's NATO envoy Dmitry Rogozin declared that Russia could not contain the volunteers from the North Caucasus from participation in the war against Georgia. By late afternoon, Kokoity canceled total mobilization. The Russian Foreign Ministry said that the assault on "the pro-Georgian puppet" Sanakoev was "obviously staged" and accused Georgia of "open act of aggression" against South Ossetia. Russian deputy foreign minister Grigory Karasin arrived in Tbilisi. Kommersant confirmed that Georgians had taken control of the Sarabuki height after the attack on Sanakoev and observed, "Since the loss of a key height for Tskhinvali is unacceptable, large-scale hostilities may begin around the village of Sarabuk."

Igor Smirnov, president of self-proclaimed Transnistria, arrived in Tskhinvali on July 3. One South Ossetian politician, commenting on the shelling of Tskhinvali during this visit, said on July 4 that Georgians were the "accidental people" in the Caucasus because their disrespect of the guest from Transnistria contradicted the customs of the Caucasus region.

The Kavkaz Center reported on 4 July that Chechen separatists had intelligence data that Russia was preparing a military operation against Georgia in August–September 2008 which mainly aimed to expel Georgian forces from the Kodori Gorge; this would be followed by the expulsion of Georgian units and population from South Ossetia. The decision to attack Georgia had been made by Putin before Medvedev became president and the preparations had been ongoing for the several months. Provocations would antecede the start of the war.

==== July 5–7 ====
On 5 July 2008, the article was published by the Russian online paper Forum.msk.ru with the headline "Russia is on the verge of a great Caucasian war", stating that the war with Georgia had never been so close. The chief editor of the paper, Anatoly Baranov, just returning from the North Caucasus where he had spoken with Russian officers stationed in Rostov-on-Don, stated that "the army wants to fight" as the officers were seeing the war as the only solution to Russia's internal problems.

Abkhaz leader Sergei Bagapsh claimed that Abkhaz military counterintelligence became aware of the Georgian plans to attack Abkhazia in April–May 2008.

According to South Ossetian authorities, the Georgian side began firing on the South Ossetian post in Ubiat at 23:20 on July 5 with automatic firearms and then began using grenade launchers. During the night of 6 July, the Georgians opened fire on the posts near Tskhinvali and wounded one man. South Ossetians said that they didn't return fire. Later, Georgian authorities reported that fire was opened on the Georgian villages of Nuli and Kekhvi, but the Georgian forces did not return fire. South Ossetian interior minister Mikhail Mindzaev accused Georgia of a military build-up near South Ossetia's borders.

On 6 July 2008, Georgian interior ministry reported that there were explosions near the villages of Rukhi and Ganmukhuri near the Abkhaz border. A bomb in Gali in Abkhazia killed four people and wounded six. Abkhaz authorities claimed that Georgian "state terrorism" was responsible for the blasts and severed all communication with Georgia in response to the bombing. The travel documents of the Georgian citizens, who had the right to enter Gali, were seized and they could not leave Abkhazia. Georgia decried the bombings and blamed them on Russia, claiming the attacks were being done for a continued Russian military deployment in Georgia. South Ossetian leader Eduard Kokoity blamed the "provocations" on Georgia, and said, "Therefore, we must exercise wisdom, calmness, restraint, thus we will aid fastest collapse of the regime of Saakashvili." The French Foreign Ministry called to resume negotiations in a statement. Secretary General of the Council of Europe Terry Davis expressed his concern over the recent blasts in Abkhazia and said that "the situation may spin out of control." President of the United States George W. Bush discussed Georgia with his Russian counterpart Medvedev at the 34th G8 summit.

Gruziya Online reported on 7 July that Bagapsh, the leader of the breakaway Abkhazia, planned to attack Upper Abkhazia, with the start of operation being scheduled for August 11–12 and Bagapsh reportedly planned to visit Moscow for the final consent for this operation.

The Ministry of Defense of Georgia said on 7 July that when the Georgian side spotted about ten militants trying to sabotage a Georgian-controlled by-pass road in South Ossetia, the Georgians fired upon the group and the Ossetians withdrew to the nearest village. On 8 July 2008, South Ossetia reported that four Georgian Defense Ministry spies were arrested near to the village of Okona in the Znauri district the night before. Georgian peacekeeping commander Mamuka Kurashvili said that four Georgian soldiers were kidnapped on the previous night from the Georgian territory near Kareli, Georgia outside of the South Ossetian conflict zone. South Ossetia accused Georgian secret services of kidnapping a 14-year old resident of Tskhinvali. The Georgian law enforcement was ordered by Georgian President Mikheil Saakashvili to arrange the liberation of soldiers. South Ossetian interior minister Mikhail Mindzaev ruled out the release of Georgian soldiers until Georgia returned 14-year-old boy. Later, it became known that the soldiers were released after Saakashvili's order to carry out a police operation.

==== July 8–9 ====
On 8 July 2008, South Ossetian envoy Dmitry Medoev accused Georgia of preparations for the war and claimed that the Georgian military had evacuated around 300 children from Georgian enclaves in Tamarasheni, Nuli, Eredvi and Kurta since July 5. Medoyev said: "we are not opening fire yet, as there was an order."

Russian military jets had an overflight over South Ossetia on 8 July 2008. On 9 July, Colonel Zurab Pochkhua, the deputy commander of Georgian Air Force, said that 4 Russian jets were flying for nearly 40 minutes close to Tskhinvali, while Russia accused Georgia of committing "a serious breach" by flying two Georgian Sukhoi Su-25 fighter jets over South Ossetia. On 10 July, the Russian authorities acknowledged the flight. Russia said in an official statement the fighters were sent to "let hot heads in Tbilisi cool down." Four captured Georgian servicemen had already been released by the time of the overflight. The overflight violated the 2002 resolution of the Joint Control Commission requiring pre-approval for the overflights over the conflict zones. Georgian authorities acknowledged that they knew about the release of the Georgian officers by midday and special operation in South Ossetia was no longer being considered by 20:10 when the overflight began. This was the first time in the 2000s that Russia had confessed to an overflight of Georgian territory. A scheduled visit of Condoleezza Rice, the US Secretary of State, to Georgia on the next day nearly coincided with the timing of the flight. In response, Georgia summoned back its ambassador to Russia "for consultations", stating that it was "outraged by Russia's aggressive policies." Saakashvili noted the close proximity of the Russian overflight to Tbilisi and commented, "Maybe that's how they welcomed Condoleezza Rice." The Georgian foreign ministry called the overflights open "military aggression" by Russia.

On 8 July 2008, the statement was made by U.S. Secretary of State Condoleezza Rice that Abkhaz and South Ossetian conflicts would be settled by Georgian NATO Membership Action Plan. The statement caused a negative outcry in Moscow: Russian foreign minister Sergey Lavrov responded, during his meeting with the de facto Abkhaz president Sergei Bagapsh, that Georgia's accession to NATO "may undermine the conflict resolution". Rice arrived in Georgia on 9 July. She put the blame for the escalation on Russian inflammatory actions over the past months and said that Georgia "has to be treated like" an independent country. Rice stated on July 10 in Tbilisi that Russia "needs to be a part of resolving the problem and solving the problems and not contributing to it." Saakashvili said at a joint conference that Georgia and Russia should work together to ensure the safety of the Sochi Olympics.

On 9 July 2008, an incident took place in the buffer zone between Abkhaz-controlled area and the Georgian-controlled Kodori Gorge, which left 3 Georgian policemen injured. Georgian Interior Ministry said that the UN monitors were denied access to the area by the Abkhaz side. Abkhaz authorities claimed that 2 Abkhaz militiamen were wounded on Mount Achamkhara after an attack by 10 Georgian saboteurs. According to the Georgian Ministry, a separate incident took place near Abkhazia-Georgia proper border when Georgian police post was attacked. Georgian foreign minister Eka Tkeshelashvili and state minister for reintegration Temur Iakobashvili accused Russia of orchestrating provocations and sabotaging peace process. Abkhaz State Security Service accused Georgia of staging the incident in the Zugdidi District ahead of Condoleezza Rices' visit. According to the source of Gruziya Online, the incident in Kodori was a preparatory action carried out by the Russian paratroopers before the capture of the Georgian-controlled Kodori gorge and they were wearing the uniforms of the Abkhaz forces for camouflaging.

==== July 10–12 ====
On 10 July 2008, Colonel General Sergey Makarov, the commander of the North Caucasus Military District (SKVO), said SKVO had to help both the peacekeeping forces and civilian residents in the separatist regions. Dmitry Medoyev, South Ossetian presidential envoy to Russia, declared on 11 July that South Ossetia "has all the necessary forces and means to repel" Georgia without resorting to Russia's aid, adding that more Russian peacekeepers should be deployed to the conflict zone. That day a statement of the Russian Ministry of Defense said that they had "to increase the combat readiness" of the Russian peacekeepers present in Abkhazia, adding that security had been increased at the military installations, and "additional training" had been given "to explain regulations governing the use of firearms while on duty." Nika Rurua, Deputy Head of the Georgian Parliament's Security and Defense Committee, warned Georgia would shoot down Russia's military aircraft should they appear in its airspace again. The proposal was discussed to this effect, but Georgian lawmakers decided instead to appeal to the international community on the matter. In response to Georgian organization of a special UNSC meeting, the sources in the Russian Foreign Ministry claimed that Russia would reveal the details of a planned Georgian military operation in South Ossetia to release the Georgian officers.

Gruziya Online reported that Abkhaz leader Sergei Bagapsh visited Moscow to finalize plans of attack on Upper Abkhazia. Russia reportedly was preparing to deploy 76th Guards Air Assault Division from Pskov to Abkhazia and Russian airborne brigades were already present in Abkhazia in violation of the existing agreements without the consent of Tbilisi. According to anonymous source, 45 wagons of Russian armament had arrived during the past week. According to another anonymous source, Russian military was redeploying in South Ossetia and a Russian military plan to wage war against Georgia in both Abkhazia and South Ossetia did exist. Another news report by abkhazeti.ru alleged that according to the source, the Russian special services were sending over a hundred Chechens from Vostok Battaliion, loyal to the GRU, to Abkhazia. It was alleged that the Chechens would stage an attack on the Russian peacekeepers and after casualties would happen, the attack would be blamed on Georgia and a full-scale offensive to occupy the Kodori Gorge, Zugdidi and Kutaisi would be launched. Abkhaz foreign minister Sergei Shamba declared that Bagapsh planned to negotiate the opening of the office of the Russian Foreign Ministry in Abkhazia.

On 11 July 2008, Georgian Deputy Foreign Minister Grigol Vashadze called for an immediate UN Security Council session on the conflict zones. A closed meeting was held on 21 July by the U.N. Security Council to review the overflights; however, no resolution was adopted. The "pro-Georgian bias" of some Security Council members was condemned by Russian representative Vitaliy Churkin.

On 11 July 2008, Aleksandr Khramchikhin wrote for Nezavisimaya Gazeta that Georgia's only chance at winning the war was "swift decapitating blow" to neutralize the separatist leadership, which required complete surprise, "so it should be carried out not during the next aggravation of the situation, but, on the contrary, when tension is minimal." Saakashvili knew well that Georgia would finally lose the territories if the war with separatists was lost for the second time.

Former Prime Minister of South Ossetia Oleg Teziev said that South Ossetia refrained from cleansing the Georgian enclaves in the past and now they were "headache", further stating: "South Ossetia set a precedent in the international practice of resolving ethnic conflicts by ending the war without expelling the national minority that participated in the conflict from the opposite side." He claimed that Georgian advance in the previous war was stopped by the South Ossetian threat to detonate the portable nuclear devices in Tskhinvali and Tbilisi.

On 12 July 2008, Javier Solana, the High Representative of the Union for Foreign Affairs and Security Policy, condemned the Russian overflights and stated that the EU would closely follow the developments. Georgian Foreign Minister Eka Tkeshelashvili said in Riga that the deployment of additional Russian troops into Georgia would be viewed as "direct aggression" and would automatically transform Russian peacekeepers into occupiers.

==== July 14–15 ====
On 14 July 2008, Georgian deputy defense minister Batu Kutelia said more than 15 percent increase of Georgian army to 37,000 troops was intended to protect Georgian airspace and the Black Sea coast against the Russian aggression.

On 14 July 2008, Nezavisimaya Gazeta (NG) reported that NG had gained a possession of the secret report which was read at a closed session of the State Duma's security committee in the Spring of 2008 and contained an analysis of the situation in Georgia. The report stated that Russia had several options, among them to "passively wait as the process of aggravation of the situation takes place, and to take decisive action by intervening at the stage of armed conflict." Russian political scientist Sergey Markedonov wrote that several journalists had called specific dates of alleged hostilities between Russia and Georgia.

Head of the Government of South Ossetia Yury Morozov told Komsomolskaya Pravda that "we have an excellent aviation" against Georgians, adding that he meant "our, Russian planes". The journalist observed that columns of the Infantry fighting vehicles and tanks were deployed near the Russo-Georgian border, from which march Towards Tskhinvali required half a day.

On 15 July, a spokesman for the Union of Russia and Belarus said Abkhazia and South Ossetia had talked about joining the Union, but that they would need to be recognized as independent and become observers before they could join the Union as members.

==== July 18–20 ====
On 18 July, Komsomolskaya Pravda reported that the construction of the gas pipeline from Vladikavkaz to Tskhinvali would be completed by the year's end and Georgia was finally losing Tskhinvali.

Source in Sukhumi told Gruziya-Online that the investigation of the Gagra bomb blast was almost finished and 4 suspects were arrested in Abkhazia. 3 of suspects were ethnic Abkhaz and 1 was ethnic Armenian. Two of the suspects were participants of the 1992-1993 war in Abkhazia and were recipients of the Abkhaz awards.

Russian journalist Maxim Kalashnikov wrote that Georgian military attack on Abkhazia and South Ossetia could lead to Russia losing the North Caucasus and the only solution to this problem was the recognition of Abkhazia and South Ossetia. Kalashnikov stated that Russia's 1991 borders "do not correspond to the interests of security and development of the Russian civilization" and Russia had to begin "reformatting" of the post-Soviet space by solving of the "Georgian question" first. Kalashnikov admitted that Russia was involved in the overthrow of Zviad Gamsakhurdia. Kalashnikov wrote that after the annexation of Abkhazia and South Ossetia, Russia had to aid the self-determination of Mingrelians and Adjarians. He noted that pro-western Ossetian activists had emerged who were seeking to separate North Ossetia from Russia and Russia had to act quickly.

According to media reports, Abkhaz militias attacked a Georgian police post using grenades on 19 July 2008; one Abkhaz militiaman died from an accidental explosion of a grenade. Abkhaz officials denied the attack. Georgian media reported on 19 July that a battalion of Russian troops had moved into the lower Kodori Gorge. Source in the Abkhaz armed structure of Gali District, Abkhazia said that Russian troops in the lower Kodori gorge, coordinated by Emzar Kvitsiani, were preparing to launch an attack on the Georgian-controlled part of the gorge. Commenting on alleged Russian deployment to the Kodori Gorge, Abkhazia's Foreign Minister said no new troops entered Abkhazia over the quota.

On 20 July 2008, South Ossetian official media concluded its news report by saying, "But the fact that events in the Georgian-Ossetian conflict zone continue to be one of the most interesting topics for discussion even at the international level, is a good sign that allows us to hope for a positive solution of the issue of freedom and independence of the Republic of South Ossetia in the near future."

==== July 21–27 ====
Georgian Defense Ministry claimed Russian troops occupied strategic passes of the Main Caucasus Ridge and were battle-ready.

A U.N. report issued on 23 July 2008, describing the period between April and July 2008, noted discrepancies with the Georgian account of a shooting in Khurcha on the day of Georgian elections. In particular the report noted "the fact that the incident was filmed in such a way as to suggest that events were anticipated." The report said Georgian reconnaissance flights violated the ceasefire, but the shooting down of those fights also constituted a breach of the ceasefire. Concerning a military buildup in Abkhazia by Georgia, the UN report said it found no evidence of a buildup, but noted observers were denied access to certain areas, including the Kvabchara Valley.

Russian newspaper Trud reported that if Georgia attacked Tskhinvali, the Russian intervention would most likely come in the form of aerial and artillery support. Anonymous Russian officers were quoted as saying that the scale and nature of the response would be determined by the politicians.

On 25 July 2008, Pavel Felgenhauer wrote that Georgian defense capabilities would be increased in 2009, "therefore today's Tbilisi has no objective interest in initiating a war right now." Felgenhauer stated that Abkhazians and Ossetians would not be able to independently fight in the possible full-scale conflict expected in the near future. Felgenhauer further wrote that Russian military "will have to actually fight and suffer losses almost from the first day, otherwise the self-proclaimed republics will crumble to dust very quickly."

On 25 July 2008, bombing killed one person in Tskhinvali. On 27 July, blast killed one man in Gali District, Abkhazia.

On 27 July 2008, US presidential candidate John McCain said that Vladimir Putin still ruled Russia and Russia was "putting enormous pressure on Georgia in many ways".

==== July 28–31 ====
Anatoly Barankevich, Secretary of the South Ossetian Security Council, told Nezavisimaya Gazeta that the Russian exercises in the North Caucasus were connected with the situation in the Caucasus. He accused Georgia of financing the Chechen insurgents and of waging an undeclared war against Russia.

On 28 July 2008, the Georgian flag was hoisted on the strategic Sarabuki height by the Georgian Defense Ministry. Later, the Russian command of the Joint Peacekeeping Forces (JPKF) said peacekeepers and OSCE monitors had been barred by South Ossetians from entering the village of Cholibauri which was close to where Georgia said South Ossetia was building fortifications. South Ossetian armed militias fired at the peacekeepers and OSCE observers. Georgian media reported that Georgian posts on the Sarabuki heights were assaulted by South Ossetian forces overnight and early on 29 July, with no woundings reported. The Georgian village of Sveri was shelled with small arms and rocket-propelled grenades by the South Ossetians on the morning of 29 July. South Ossetian official accused Georgia of opening fire first. The peacekeepers and OSCE observers visited the area near Sveri to investigate an exchange of fire; however, they were fired upon at 10:00. On the late evening of the same day, South Ossetia said due to South Ossetian positions being fortified on the frontier of the conflict zone, two South Ossetian villages had been fired on by Georgian forces in the morning. Georgia reported that Ossetians fired on the Sarabuki height at around 22:00. The South Ossetian Press and Information Committee reported one man as wounded as a result from Georgian attack from Sarabuki height.

On 29 July 2008, South Ossetian leader Eduard Kokoity declared that the Army of Nagorno-Karabakh was stronger than the Georgian Army. He said that although the South Ossetian army was not equipped according to NATO standards, it was still a force to be reckoned with for the Georgians.

On 29 July 2008, RBK Daily reported that Russia toughened its rhetoric against the United States and a source in the Russian Foreign Ministry threatened that Russia would halt negotiations on "substantial issues of interest to the American side." The source said that Russia was sick of the US "telling us how to behave, with whom to be friends, with whom to fight." American support of Georgia's push to restore its territorial integrity and NATO membership of the former Soviet states were quoted as major reasons behind Russia's escalation.

On 31 July 2008, South Ossetian interior minister Mikhail Mindzaev admitted to building military fortifications in the conflict zone which violated previous agreements. Mindzaev claimed it was in response to similar actions by Georgia. Mindzaev accused Georgia of "creeping annexation". Vladimir Ivanov, Assistant Commander of the JPKF, reported that South Ossetian servicemen hindered the monitoring mission by the JPKF and OSCE observers.

=== Military exercises ===
On 3 July, the Russian Federal Security Service border troops staged an exercise near the Georgian border in North Ossetia in which they repelled an armed attack on the Nizhny Zaramag border crossing. Russian Defense and Interior Ministry troops also participated in the simulation. This kind of training was staged for the first time since the 90s.

On 5 July 2008, the Russians began military training, named Caucasus Frontier 2008, in the North Caucasus.

In early July 2008, OSInform Information Agency published several articles where the participation of the Russian army in the future "peace enforcement" operation in Georgia was discussed. One of the articles said that the planned Russian exercises were not accidental and this suggested a military operation on the foreign soil.

On 15 July, the United States and Russia began two parallel military trainings in the Caucasus, though Russia denied that the identical timing was intentional. The Russian exercise was named Caucasus 2008 and units of the North Caucasus Military District, including the 58th Army, took part. The exercise included training to aid peacekeeping forces stationed in Abkhazia and South Ossetia. The Black Sea Fleet and Caspian Flotilla also participated in the exercises. A Russian military spokesman Igor Konashenkov said that the exercise would use around 700 military hardware. He also said, "In connection with the aggravated situation of the Georgian-Abkhazian and Georgian-Ossetian conflicts... we will also work on participation in special operations to bring peace to zones of armed conflicts." The paratroopers from 76th Airborne Division arrived in the North Caucasus on 16 July. Russian Airborne Troops emphasized the fact that the paratroopers were not sent to Abkhazia. Russian Airborne troop detachments arrived in the area near the Roki pass. Posts of logistical and medical supplies were established along the routes of the deployment. The participants in the exercises had an air support. Georgia called the exercises a demonstration of Russian aggression against it. The Georgian Foreign Ministry said in a statement: "Not a single document on conflict resolution authorises Russian armed forces to carry out any kind of activity on the territory of Georgia."

On 18 July, the Roki and Mamisoni Passes on the border with Georgia were taken by 76th Guards Air Assault Division from Pskov and 7th Guards Airborne Division from Novorossiysk. According to Nezavisimaya Gazeta, the fact that the exercises were spread across 11 regions of Russia was an evidence that the number of participating troops were higher than officially declared number. Russian General Yuri Netkachev said that the number of participating soldiers in the Russian exercises was "officially underestimated" to avoid attention of international monitors. The second stage of the Russian exercises, which were a response to US-Georgian exercises, began on 22 July. The Russian fleet would also participate in the exercises. Igor Konashenkov, assistant commander of the North Caucasus Military District, said on 23 July that the exercises gave the Mechanized infantry regiment of the Vladikavkaz division the task of securing the state border near the Roki Pass and all units of the division were deployed to the designated area and replaced the Air Assault battalion of the Pskov division. During exercises, a pamphlet named "Soldier! Know your probable enemy!" was circulated among the Russian soldiers. The pamphlet described the Georgian Armed Forces. The Russian exercises ended on 2 August. Russian troops stayed near the border with Georgia after the end of their exercise on 2 August, instead of going back to their barracks. Later, Dale Herspring, an expert on Russian military affairs at Kansas State University, described the Russian exercise as "exactly what they executed in Georgia just a few weeks later [...] a complete dress rehearsal."

The US exercises were called "Immediate Response 2008" and included servicemen from the United States, Georgia, Ukraine, Azerbaijan, and Armenia. According to the officials, the exercises had been planned months in advance. The exercises were held at the former Russian military base in Vaziani. 127 American participating troops served as trainers in the exercises. Counter-insurgency action was the focal point of the joint exercise. The Georgian brigade was trained to serve in Iraq. A total of 1,630 servicemen, including 1,000 American troops, took part in the exercise, which concluded on 31 July. American troops had already left Georgia when the Russian invasion of Georgia began in August 2008.

== New peace efforts ==
=== Spring 2008 ===
On 5 March 2008, Georgia left the Joint Control Commission for Georgian–Ossetian Conflict Resolution and suggested a new negotiation scheme which would include the EU, OSCE and the Sanakoyev government.

On 28 March 2008, the Office of the Georgian State Minister for Reintegration summmoned an international conference "The Role of Non-Governmental Organisations in the Processes of Reintegration in Georgia". The conference was attended by the President of Georgia Mikheil Saakashvili. Saakashvili announced new initiatives on the Abkhaz conflict, which were a joint free economic zone, Abkhaz representation in the central government and an Abkhaz vice-president, the right to veto all Abkhaz-related decisions, limitless autonomy and various security guarantees. However, the initiatives were dismissed by Abkhaz separatists.

On 17 April 2008, Georgian minister for Euro-Atlantic Integration Giorgi Baramidze said if Abkhazia allowed the return of refugees, then Georgia would sign the treaty on non-use of force.

Deputy Assistant Secretary of State for European and Eurasian Affairs Matthew Bryza declared at the Central Asia-Caucasus Institute: "Nobody wants such a development of the situation, when Georgian and Russian soldiers will face each other." He said that he did not have an "impression that Georgia is 100 percent right" and added: "Leaders of Georgia also need to work a lot more on peace proposals so that Abkhazians stop feeling fears." Bryza also said that the existing peace formats for Georgia's breakaway regions no longer worked and "we need to rejuvenate [friends'] process." Georgian foreign minister Davit Bakradze said that NATO's promise to consider Georgia's possible accession in December 2008 contributed to Russia's aggressiveness: "this is the window of opportunity: to blow up Georgia in order not to make MAP in December possible."

On 24 April 2008, Georgian president Saakashvili announced that Georgia would discuss with allies how to revise the peacekeeping format and increased involvement of other countries in the peace process because "the presence of the Russian [peacekeeping] contingent there [in Abkhazia and South Ossetia], as well as [Russia’s] recent actions, is a risk factor in the conflict zone."

US Senators Joe Biden and Richard Lugar wrote that NATO's attempt to appease Russia by denying MAP to Georgia and Ukraine failed because in several days Moscow began to establish close ties with Abkhazia and South Ossetia in order to sabotage Saakashvili's peace plan on Abkhazia.

On 30 April 2008, Member of the European Parliament Marie Anne Isler Béguin said that Russian peacekeepers were ineffective and the peacekeeping format should be changed. The EU was asked by Georgia to consider the deployment of European peacekeepers to the Georgian-Abkhazian conflict zone.

Georgian president Saakashvili and President of Ukraine Viktor Yushchenko issued a joint statement criticizing recent Russian actions. Ukraine announced willingness to participate in the peacekeeping operation in Georgia and approved Saakashvili's new peace plan on Abkhazia.

Members of the Abkhaz parliament adopted a declaration to halt peace negotiations with the US, the UK, France and Germany because the "Group of Friends of the Secretary-General" was biased towards Georgia. In early May, Abkhaz foreign minister Sergei Shamba said that Abkhazia was disappointed in the West and approved the parliament's stance.

On 1 May 2008, United States Secretary of State Condoleezza Rice said that increase in Russian peacekeeping contingent in Abkhazia was unnecessary. On 3 May 2008, Russian foreign minister Sergey Lavrov said that "plans to pull Georgia into NATO" were to blame for Georgia's "inability to negotiate" on Abkhazia with Russia. He expressed hope that Georgia and "those capitals, which are pulling Georgia in the North Atlantic alliance" would not make "artificial problems in this very sensitive region."

On 1 May 2008, Georgian Finance Minister Nika Gilauri announced that $150 million from the sale of Georgian-issued Eurobonds would be transferred to the Fund of Future Generations, which was intended to finance the development of the former breakaway regions after the restoration of Georgia's territorial integrity.

Georgian and Abkhaz sides were talking about deescalation of tensions in early May. However, each side had different vision, with Georgians focusing on recent peace plan proposed by Saakashvili and the Abkhaz demanding the Georgian withdrawal from the Kodori Gorge and abolition of Georgian sanctions.

On 10 May 2008, Matthew Bryza and the US ambassador to Georgia John F. Tefft met with the Abkhaz leadership. According to Bryza, Georgian drone overflights over Abkhazia were justified.

On 12 May 2008, the Foreign Ministers of Lithuania, Latvia, Poland, Sweden and Slovenia visited Georgia. Saakashvili spoke alongside the ministers and presented a Russian leaflet promoting the Sochi Olympics as a proof of Russia's design on Abkhazia. Saakashvili said that Russia's escalation was "a prelude to the act of annexation and act of occupation". Saakashvili said that when Georgia was occupied in 1921, Russia then attacked other European countries; Saakashvili expressed hope that "Europe will never again makes the similar mistake".

On 12 May 2008, President of Ukraine Viktor Yushchenko and President of Lithuania Valdas Adamkus issued a joint statement supporting the territorial integrity of states, including Georgia.

On 12 May 2008, Georgia's UN envoy Irakli Alasania visited Sukhumi to discuss peace plan with Abkhaz leader Sergei Bagapsh. The peace plan included proposals on the Georgian commitment not to use force and Abkhaz commitment to allow the return of Georgian refugees. Abkhaz foreign minister Sergei Shamba commented that Abkhazia was not completely against this plan. Bagapsh planned to visit Moscow on 19 May to get approval for the Abkhaz-Georgian peace plan.

On 15 May 2008, the United Nations General Assembly passed a resolution underlining the right of return of all refugees and internally displaced persons (IDPs) to Abkhazia in addition to their property rights. Russia voted against the Georgian-sponsored resolution. The Russian Foreign Ministry said that Georgian proposal was "a counterproductive step".

On 16 May 2008, Georgian minister for reintegration Temur Iakobashvili arrived in Moscow and proposed to hold an international conference on the settlement of the conflicts. Russian foreign minister Sergey Lavrov said that the US and the EU involvement indicated that Georgia did not want the real solution to the conflicts.

On 23 May 2008, Temur Iakobashvili said after his visit to Moscow for the discussion of Saakashvili's peace plan that Georgia wanted to revise military peacekeeping formats not because "we are expelling the Russians." He added that "Russia should be one of the parties to the settlement, and not have the exclusive right to peacekeeping." He said that additional Russian troops in Abkhazia were not peacekeepers, but "illegal armed formations." Sources in the administration of the Russian president said that Russian peacekeepers would not leave Abkhazia even if Georgia demanded their withdrawal; instead Russian troops would remain as allied forces per future military agreement with Abkhazia.

In late May 2008, Vladimir Putin said that Saakashvili's peace plan regarding Abkhazia was acceptable. Putin said the plan was "correct", but it needed an approval of Sukhumi. Putin stated that Russia had asked the Abkhaz authorities to allow the return of 55 thousand Georgian refugees.

=== Summer 2008 ===
On 5 June 2008, the European Parliament adopted a resolution which condemned the deployment of Russian forces to Abkhazia and endorsed Georgia's territorial integrity. The resolution called on Russia to pull out those additional forces and stated that the peacekeeping structure should be changed because Russia was no longer an unbiased player. A "deeper European involvement in these frozen conflicts in order to move the peace processes forward" was advised. Russian officials did not comment on the resolution.

On 7 June 2008, Abkhaz president Sergei Bagapsh said after meeting with EU High Representative for the Common Foreign and Security Javier Solana that Abkhazia would never consider the replacement of the Russian peacekeepers because "there is no alternative" and Abkhazia would insist on the continued presence of the Russian peacekeepers in Abkhazia. Solana said that Russia had a significant role and there would be no conflict resolution without Russia. A two-day visit to Abkhazia by fifteen EU ambassadors was finished that day. Giorgi Baramidze, the Georgian deputy prime minister and minister on European and Euro-Atlantic integration, said: "Georgia is ready to sign a ceasefire agreement with Abkhazia if it is guaranteed by the European Union." Baramidze said that the loss of Gagra, Sukhumi and most of Abkhazia for Georgia was caused by absence of an effective guarantor of earlier agreements. He added, "We want to carry out our peace plan."

Pro-Russian authorities of South Ossetia announced to have expelled 12 European ambassadors from South Ossetia due to their meeting with pro-Georgian government of South Ossetia on June 22.

On 23 June 2008, Georgian deputy foreign minister Grigol Vashadze visited Moscow in order to organize a meeting between Georgian and Russian presidents. The Speaker of the Georgian Parliament Davit Bakradze said that Georgian president would discuss the situation in Abkhazia. Bakradze hoped that the situation would improve. Vashadze met with Russian Deputy Foreign Minister Grigory Karasin and talked about the situation in Abkhazia. On 27 June 2008, Russian newspaper Kommersant reported that Georgia had proposed Russia to divide Abkhazia into Georgian and Russian spheres of influence. Georgian refugees would return to Gali and Ochamchira District and the line of contact would be moved from Enguri river to Kodori river in the north. Russia would win by Georgia's cancelation of bid for the NATO membership. When Abkhazia's leader Sergei Bagapsh arrived in Moscow on June 26, he also met with Grigory Karasin to discuss this plan. Abkhaz authorities rejected the proposal on Abkhazia's division. Abkhaz official Ruslan Kishmaria suggested that Abkhazia might demand the return of Abkhazia's historical medieval capital Kutaisi. Russian Foreign Minister Sergey Lavrov denied that Russia was considering the plan to divide Abkhazia. However, an anonymous source in the Russian Foreign Ministry confirmed the existence of such plan. Later, the Ministry called the report as "deliberate leak of information." The Georgian Foreign Ministry denied the report on proposed spheres of influence in Abkhazia.

On 25 June 2008, Saakashvili met with high-ranking German officials in Berlin to discuss a new peace plan. Chancellor of Germany Angela Merkel met with Saakashvili. She said that Georgia would become a member of the NATO, but NATO membership depended on the settlement of the conflict in Abkhazia. She said that "the Russian peacekeeping mission should continue until new variants can be found in talks" and Germany would also be involved in the peace process. Saakashvili was planning to visit a summit of the leaders of the member parties of the International Democrat Union in Paris.

Patricia Flor, German ambassador to Georgia, was planning to meet with Sergei Bagapsh and other high-ranking officials in Sukhumi on June 27.

On 28 June 2008, the Parliamentary Assembly of the OSCE supported Georgia's territorial integrity, with OSCE PA President Göran Lennmarker saying: "We want to find a compromise and a peaceful resolution of this issue." On 30 June, American representative said that the OSCE Parliamentary Assembly urged Russia to respect Georgia's sovereignty by refraining from relations with the governments of the separatist territories.

On 30 June 2008, U.N. Secretary-General's Group of Friends discussed the Abkhaz conflict in Berlin. A three-part peace plan was announced by German Foreign Minister Frank-Walter Steinmeier, according to which a trust-building and the repatriation of around 250,000 refugees to Abkhazia would be followed first by the rebuilding of the infrastructure and then by a settlement of the conflict. Russian foreign minister Sergey Lavrov, along with U.S. Secretary of State Condoleezza Rice, endorsed the German plan. Georgian president Saakashvili also accepted the plan.

On 7 July 2008, the United States Department of State called on the central Georgian government and the Abkhaz de facto authorities to resume negotiations. The Department of State also called on Russia to stop "provocative" actions and proposed the deployment of International Police Force to Abkhazia. However, Abkhaz leader Sergei Bagapsh denied the possibility of removal of the Russian peacekeepers. The State Department spokesman also said that Condoleezza Rice would visit Georgia to support a peaceful settlement to the Abkhaz and South Ossetian conflicts.

The visit of OSCE ambassadors and the Danish foreign minister to Georgia began on 7 July, which would last until 9 July and separatists would also be visited.

On 8 July 2008, David Bakradze, chairman of Georgia's parliament, said that he raised the issue of changing the peacekeeping format in Abkhazia with UN envoy Bertrand Ramcharan. He added that if the peacekeeping format did not change, then Georgia would make a unilateral decision regarding the Russian peacekeepers. Ramcharan arrived in Abkhazia on 11 July to negotiate resumption of Abkhaz-Georgian talks.

On 9 July 2008, European diplomats stated 2 criteria for the European Union to become involved in the peacekeeping operation in Abkhazia. These criteria were: security for the foreign personnel and mutual consent from the conflict sides.

On 11 July 2008, the Parliament of Georgia adopted a resolution urging the international community to back Georgian peace proposals. The resolution said, "Otherwise, the Georgian side will be forced to undertake appropriate legal measures in the nearest future for the de-legitimization and for the prompt withdrawal of the armed forces of the Russian Federation from the conflict zones." The Western officials earlier had told Georgian authorities to pause the demand for the removal of the Russian peacekeepers.

On 14 July 2008, Sergei Bagapsh met with special envoy of the German Foreign Ministry for Eastern Europe, Central Asia and the Caucasus, Hans-Dieter Lucas. Peace plan was discussed. On the same day EU Special Representative for the South Caucasus Peter Semneby met with Abkhaz leader Sergei Bagapsh in Sukhumi. Bagapsh said that he studied a draft plan on the settlement of the Georgian-Abkhaz conflict that was worked out by the U.N. Secretary-General's Group of Friends, but he suggested that it was unacceptable for Abkhazia in its current form. Bagapsh stressed that the main condition for resuming the dialogue with Georgia was "the withdrawal of all armed units from the Kodori gorge and the signing of an agreement on non-use of force". He also said that he was "not going to discuss Abkhazia’s status with anyone" because Abkhazia was "an independent, democratic state." Peter Semneby also met with Prime Minister of Abkhazia Alexander Ankvab and foreign minister Sergei Shamba. Sergei Shamba said that "more preparation" was required.

On 14 July, the U.S. Department of State said in a statement it was "deeply troubled" by Russia's acknowledgement that Russian military plane flew over South Ossetia because "Such actions raise questions about Russia's role as peacekeeper and facilitator of the negotiations and threaten stability throughout the entire region." That day, a special session was held by the OSCE Permanent Council. The need for the resumption of talks regarding peace between Georgian and South Ossetian authorities was hightlighted. On 15 July 2008, NATO said it was concerned by Russian military flights. Russia's peacekeeping and mediating duty was questioned.

German Foreign Minister Frank-Walter Steinmeier met with Secretary-General of the United Nations Ban Ki-moon. Then Steinmeier had a phone conversation with Russian Foreign Minister Sergey Lavrov, who said Russia wanted both Georgia and Abkhazia "to accept obligations not to use force," and the withdrawal of the Georgian forces from the Kodori Gorge.

Georgian president Saakashvili told The Times, "situation is precarious and the things they [Russia] are doing are outrageous. Unfortunately, they are not opposed by the Europeans and other players." When asked about the possibility of war, Saakashvili responded: "The point is that every day we are waking up with some surprises and when sometimes I think it can’t get any worse, then it does get worse." Ronald Asmus wrote that Russia was trying "to provoke Tbilisi into actions that could lead to further Russian military intervention." He also wrote, "In the short term, we need to prevent a conflict from starting this summer." Asmus suggested that Russia would then focus on Crimea.

On 16 July 2008, Georgian National Security Council Secretary Alexander Lomaia said that "polishing" of the new German plan was still needed despite "positive elements" being present there. Lomaia also said that the return of IDPs could not start until the Russian peacekeeping force was pulled out. David Bakradze said that if a German plan for resolving the conflict did not get large support, Georgia would be forced to "unilaterally bring an influence to bear on the deployment of armed forces in Abkhazia."

Russian human rights activists began collecting signatures against the escalation of the Russian-Georgian tensions. They were of the opinion that the conflict was looming to transform into war between the two countries.

On 17 July 2008, the Georgian Foreign Ministry said in a statement that France supported the active involvement of the EU in the process of peaceful settlement of the conflicts in Georgia.

On 17 July 2008, Russian Foreign Minister Sergey Lavrov said that the repatriation of refugees to Abkhazia was "entirely unrealistic at this stage", adding "the situation first needs to be improved and trust restored." German Foreign Minister Steinmeier met with his Georgian counterpart Eka Tkeshelashvili in Tbilisi. Steinmeier said in Tbilisi that due to recent multiple incidents, the international community had "growing anxiety" and there were no more "frozen conflicts." Abkhaz foreign minister Sergei Shamba said that Georgia first had to withdraw its troops from Kodori Gorge before Abkhazia would begin negotiations. On the evening of the same day, Saakashvili said at a briefing that there were no plans in Tbilisi to use force to restore control over Abkhazia. Saakashvili called Lavrov's statement on the refugees "shameful" and said that blocking the return of refugees would be "inhumane and barbaric decision." Steinmeier met with Georgian president Mikheil Saakashvili in Batumi. Saakashvili said at a joint briefing that the conflicts of the 20th century must be solved with "modern European methods". Steinmeier said that Germany viewed Abkhazia to be Georgia's inalienable part. Steinmeier said that he wanted "a peaceful resolution based on the territorial integrity of Georgia". Sources from the German delegation called the talks with Saakashvili "difficult". The Georgian Foreign Ministry stated on 18 July that Russia was seeking to legalize the results of the Russian-sponsored ethnic cleansing.

On 18 July, Steinmeier met with Abkhaz leader Sergei Bagapsh in Gali. After his meeting with Steinmeier, Bagapsh said that Abkhazia still would not consider German peace proposal and he intended to present his own plan. Chairman of the Georgian Parliament, Davit Bakradze, called the Abkhaz refusal "just a political game" and said that the Russian position would be "decisive". On the same day, Frank-Walter Steinmeier met with Russian foreign minister Sergey Lavrov. Lavrov suggested an international "road map" on Abkhazia, however, he resisted the German plan since Georgian refugees would return to Abkhazia at the beginning of conflict resolution. Russian President Dmitry Medvedev also received Steinmeier. Medvedev insisted that Georgia must withdraw its forces from the Kodori Gorge otherwise there would be no peace between Georgia and Abkhazia. According to the source of the Russian newspaper Kommersant, Lavrov admitted to Steinmeier that the Georgian withdrawal from the Kodori Gorge was less likely in the near future. American diplomat Matthew Bryza said that Russian and Abkhaz rejection of the German peace plan was alarming.

On 21 July 2008, Russian Newsweek published an article where a source with close links with the Kremlin was quoted as saying that the territorial problems of Georgia could be settled if pro-Russian government came to power in Georgia. Russia viewed the tensions with Georgia as a part of Russia-America confrontation. Sources told Newsweek that the Russian overflight over South Ossetia in early July was sanctioned by Russian president Dmitry Medvedev after consultation with Vladimir Putin. There were indications that Georgia would receive the status of NATO associate member in December 2008, and Russia understood that it was forced to settle the Georgian problem quickly. The Russian Foreign Ministry source said that Irakli Alasania negotiated the meeting between Georgian and Abkhaz presidents in May 2008; however, the interested parties organized the blasts in Abkhazia, which caused this meeting to be cancelled.

On 21 July 2008, REGNUM News Agency reported that the western mediators were proposing to replace Georgian troops in the Kodori gorge with international police force. This force would exclude Russia. Matthew Bryza said that currently there was no need to deploy international force in Abkhazia and the United States was working to establish direct dialogue between Georgian and Abkhaz sides. Abkhaz foreign minister Sergei Shamba said that the replacement of Georgian troops with international force was his initiative.

By 22 July 2008, Georgian intelligence had given the West some proof of Russian military build-up in Abkhazia. The Georgian government stated on 22 July that "the German plan in its present form does not address the proximate cause of the recent, dangerous escalation in the conflict zones: the role and actions of Russia, a central player in degrading security in Georgia." Carl Bildt, Swedish Minister of Foreign Affairs, said that Russia's 16 April decision was the culmination of annexation of Abkhazia. On 23 July, Daniel Fried, Assistant Secretary of State, stressed that Georgia's territorial integrity and the return of refugees to Abkhazia were the key principles, and promised that the removal of Russian peacekeepers would be discussed. Russian foreign minister Lavrov told Condoleezza Rice that the return of the refugees to Abkhazia must be postponed to the later phase of the peace settlement. On 24 July, analyst Vladimir Socor criticized the German plan and stated that Germany was more sympathetic towards Russia's position on Georgia's territorial integrity.

On 23 July 2008, the meeting of the EU foreign ministers, after hearing German Foreign Minister Steinmeier's report on Abkhazia, recognized that Russia was a party to the conflict in Georgia.

On 24 July 2008, Matthew Bryza said that Russia "has taken steps that are deeply provocative and have led to some people in Georgia calculating that their only way forward is through escalation, and that is a path that cannot succeed." Bryza arrived in Georgia on July 25 and was planning to visit Sukhumi together with Patricia Flor, German Ambassador to Georgia.

On 25 July 2008, the South Ossetian separatists rejected proposal by the OSCE chairman-in-office Alexander Stubb to hold Georgia-South Ossetia meeting in Helsinki. The separatists had previously refused to participate in talks in Brussels arranged by the EU on 22 July. According to Kommersant, the South Ossetian decision to refuse participation in Brussels talks was coordinated with Moscow.

On 25 July, the Abkhaz separatists met with Matthew Bryza. Bryza declared in Sukhumi that Russia was "more or less" in favor of the German plan approved by the Group of the Friends of the UN Secretary General. Lack of progress in peace settlement alarmed Bryza. Abkhaz officials suggested that the German project was irrelevant to Abkhazia regardless of which country supported it. Bryza tried to persuade the Abkhaz authorities to unanimously agree to talks in Berlin the following week, but Abkhaz officials refused. Later that day, Abkhaz president Sergei Bagapsh hinted that the Abkhaz could meet with the Group of Friends in Berlin. Abkhaz foreign minister Sergei Shamba also said that the Abkhaz "in principle" did not oppose talks in Berlin. However, according to Shamba, Abkhazia would not resume direct negotiations with Georgia's central government. Russian ambassador to UN Vitaly Churkin said that Russia objected to urgent meeting of the UN Secretary General's Group of Friends on Georgia. According to the Jamestown Foundation, the Western involvement "may help steer the process away from the Russian-controlled formats. This is why Moscow encouraged Sukhumi to thwart the German-proposed consultations." Russian editorial opined that the Western initiatives contradicted Russia's interests and the placement of American bases in Abkhazia could lead to the loss of the North Caucasus for Russia.

On 26 July, Matthew Bryza, U.S. Deputy Assistant Secretary of State, left Sukhumi and arrived in Tbilisi. He said that Georgian and Abkhaz separatist officials must start direct unconditional talks. Georgian Security Council Secretary Alexander Lomaia said after meeting with Bryza that the United States proposed a new peace plan combining elements from Saakashvili, Steinmeier and Rice plans. Bryza denied media reports that he had demanded the Georgian withdrawal from the Kodori Gorge.

On 28 July 2008, UN Secretary-General Ban Ki-moon expressed his concern over the escalation in Abkhazia, which could have "unpredictable consequences for a fragile peace process", and increasing hostility between Russia and Georgia.

On 29 July 2008, Bagapsh said that Abkhazia would never agree to the deployment of the international police force to Abkhazia.

On 30 July 2008, a German Foreign Ministry spokesman said that efforts were made by Germany to organize a meeting between the Georgian and Abkhaz officials. Abkhaz separatists had earlier rejected to attend talks in Berlin scheduled on July 30–31.

On 31 July 2008, Abkhaz president Sergei Bagapsh said there would be a separate meeting between Abkhazia and the Group of UN Secretary General's Friends on Georgia (the U.K., Germany, Russia, U.S. and France). Bagapsh said that Georgia would hold a separate meeting with the Group. Bagapsh also said, "The meeting was initially planned for July 28–29. However, this didn't suit us. We have settled on August 15–20 for the meeting."

== August 2008: War ==
South Ossetian attacks on Georgian positions caused incidents in South Ossetia in early August 2008.

The crisis gave rise on 7 August 2008, when the Georgian villages were shelled several hours after a cease-fire announced by Georgian president Saakashvili. The Georgian army began a military operation against South Ossetian separatists.

On 26 August 2008, Russia recognised Abkhazia and South Ossetia as independent republics. The United States, United Kingdom, France, Germany, Italy and Sweden did not approve this decision. In response to Russia's recognition of Abkhazia and South Ossetia, the Georgian government announced that the country severed all diplomatic relations with Russia.

== Aftermath of the war ==
After the war, a number of incidents occurred in both conflict zones, and tensions between the belligerents remained high.

== See also ==
- Prelude to the 2022 Russian invasion of Ukraine
- Frozen conflict
- Georgia–Russia relations
- Georgia–European Union relations
- Georgia–United States relations
- Russia–United States relations
- NATO–Russia relations
