= 2008 Abkhazia bombings =

In June and July 2008 a series of bombings took place in Abkhazia

- Location: railway outside Sukhumi, Gagra, Sukhumi, Inguri River border crossing, Gali
- Date: June 18, 29, 30, July 2, 6 2008
- Attack type: bombings
- Deaths: 4
- Injuries: 18
- Perpetrators: Georgian Security Service (suspected); Abkhazian criminal groups (suspected)

In June and July 2008 a series of bombings took place in Georgia's breakaway republic of Abkhazia, killing 4 and injuring 18 people.

== The bombings ==
=== June 18 Sukhumi railway bombings ===
On June 18, two bombs exploded within 5 minutes of each other on the railway tracks outside Sukhumi. No one was injured as a result, though the tracks sustained minor damage.

=== June 29 Gagra bombings ===
On June 29, two bombs exploded within 5 minutes of each other in the centre of Gagra, injuring 6. The first explosion happened close to Gagra's market, the second explosion took place near a supermarket. One 38-year-old woman received shrapnel wounds to her eye and had to be treated in a Sochi hospital. One other woman had to be taken to Gagra hospital with shrapnel wounds.

=== June 30 Sukhumi bombings ===
On June 30, two bombs exploded within 5 minutes of each other in the centre of Sukhumi, injuring 6. Both explosions happened close to Sukhumi's market. According to Abkhazian law enforcement officers, the explosive devices did not contain shrapnel-generating objects, suggesting that the aim of the explosions was terrorising the population. Four of the six injured had to be taken to the Sukhumi City Clinical Hospital.

=== July 2 Inguri river border crossing bombing ===
On July 2, an unidentified vehicle passed the Georgian interior ministry post and approached Russian peacekeepers' post 301. At approximately 300 meter distance, an object was thrown out of the car which subsequently exploded. The vehicle then turned and drove back unhindered past the Georgian interior ministry post. No one was injured as a result of the explosion.

=== July 6 Gali bombing ===
On July 6, at 10.58 pm, a bomb exploded in a cafe in Gali, killing 4 and injuring 6. The four people killed were Jansukh Muratia, acting chief of the Abkhazian security service's Gali department, Sukhran Gumba, employee of the border department of the Abkhazian security service, Anzor Lagvilava, interpreter of the UN Mission in Georgia in the Gali district and Iveta Toria, local resident. The six injured were taken to hospitals in Gali and Sukhumi.

== Aftermath ==
In response to the June 29 and 30 bombings, Abkhazia closed its border with Georgia on July 1. Residents of the Gali district who were in Georgia at that moment received three days to return.

== Reactions ==
=== Abkhazia ===
The Abkhazian side accused Georgia of being behind all 7 bombings. It described the June 18 bombings as a terrorist attack against the Russian Railway Forces in Abkhazia, who had recently started repairing the Sukhumi-Ochamchire section of the Abkhazian railway, to the detriment of Georgia. The June 29 and 30 bombings were likewise described as terrorist attacks, perpetrated with the aim of destroying the tourism season in Abkhazia. According to Ruslan Kishmaria, special representative of Abkhazian president Sergei Bagapsh to the Gali district:

I believe the person who ordered these terrorist acts paid well for them and we should look for this person in the security services of Georgia. When Tbilisi pretends to be insulted that the Abkhaz should falsely accuse it, it's just a game.

In response to the July 6 Gali bombing, President Bagapsh accused Georgia of having chosen the way of state terrorism.

=== Georgia ===
The Georgian side has vehemently denied the Abkhazian accusations, with Defence Minister David Kezerashvili stating that they were "not serious". Officials in Tbilisi and Georgian media offered as alternative explanation that the bombings were the result of a power struggle among different criminal groups in Abkhazia. Georgian MP Nika Rurua, a deputy chairman of the parliamentary committee for defense and security, said that the blasts were aimed at “terrorizing the local population” in order to increase anti-Georgian sentiment in the region.

On July 7, the Georgian government released a statement in which it condemned the bombings and said:

Those acts of violence are in the interests of forces hoping to prolong the presence of illegally deployed Russian military forces in Georgia; of forces resisting demilitarization and peace in the region and of those who want to derail Georgia's European and Euro-Atlantic aspirations.

=== Russian peacekeepers ===
In reaction to the July 2 bombing near the Russian peacekeepers' post, Aleksander Diordiev, aide to the commander of the peacekeeping troops, accused the Georgian side, saying:

The actions of the Georgian secret services are of a provocative nature, which aim at destabilizing the situation in the southern part of the Georgian-Abkhaz conflict zone and also at provoking the peacekeepers

=== Independent observers ===
In response to the Gagra bombings, Tbilisi based political analyst Paata Zakareishvili stated that she thought it unlikely that they were the result of a struggle between criminal groups. According to Zakareishvili it is plausible that the bombings were aimed to disrupt the tourist season:

This aim was basically achieved. I think that the tourist season in Abkhazia has been wrecked. I don't subscribe to the theory that it was some kind of business feud. If one businessman blows up another's business, his own business also suffers, because the tourist season is the main source of revenue there.

At the same time, Zakareishvili considered the Abkhazian decision to close their border with Georgia unwise, because it would only serve to alienate the Gali district population.

=== Georgian call for an international police force ===
In its statement made on July 7 after the Gali bombing, the Georgian government renewed its call for an international police force in the Gali and Ochamchire districts. This call found support with the United States Department of State, but was immediately rejected by the Abkhazian side.
