= Khurcha =

Khurcha (Georgian: ხურჩა) is a village in Georgia. It is located in the Odishi Lowland, on the left bank of the Enguri river, at an altitude of 8 meters above sea level in the Zugdidi Municipality of the Samegrelo-Zemo Svaneti region. The village is 18 km from the regional center, Zugdidi. Across the Togi river, on the right bank, lies the village of Nabakevi in the Gali District, which is connected to Khurcha by a bridge. On the other side, across the Enguri river, lies the village of Anaklia.

According to the 2014 census, 535 people lived in the village.

The majority of the population are Georgians (specifically, Mingrelians). They practice Orthodoxy and are parishioners of the Zugdidi and Tsaishi Eparchy of the Georgian Orthodox Church.

The village has a secondary school that is also attended by students from the village of Nabakevi, due to the suppression of the Georgian language in the Gali district and the ban on teaching it in the district's schools.

The population's primary source of income is agriculture, especially nuts.

== See also ==
- 2008 Khurcha incident
