= Six Days: Three Activists, Three Wars, One Dream =

- Film poster
- Directed by: Nikolina Gillgren
- Produced by: Johan Sandstrom, Thelma and Louise Production Company
- Starring: Lanja Abdullah, Nelly S. Cooper, Maia Kvaratskhelia
- Cinematography: Ivan Blanco
- Edited by: Lars Gustafson, Hanna Lejonqvist
- Music by: Andreas Unge, Jacob Gurevitsch
- Distributed by: Women Make Movies
- Release date: 22 October 2013
- Running time: 56 minutes
- Country: Sweden
- Languages: English, Kurdish, Georgian

Six Days: Three Activists, Three Wars, One Dream is a documentary film by director Nikolina Gillgren, which follows three human rights activists in Liberia, Iraq and Georgia over six days. It provides insight into the everyday struggle of making women's lives better, worldwide.

== Synopsis ==
The documentary follows three women who were witness to war in their respective countries and who used that experience to work on women's rights and women's issues.

Lanja Abdullah is a journalist in Iraq, who works with women's issues. She is the head of Warvin, a women's rights organization founded in 2009, and is also an editor for Warvin magazine. She is part of the historically oppressed Kurdish population in Iraq and therefore, explores the honor related Violence against women in the Kurdish region of Iraq. She interacts with the police in Iraq to get in touch with women who are abused in their homes or are attempted to kill and tries to rescue them.

Nelly S. Cooper, in Liberia, is the leader for West Point Women's Health and Development Organization, a community-based organization that helps women in Monrovia. Cooper interacts with traumatized women and attempts to help them, while also educating them about the myriad benefits education can have for them. She also runs a women's cooperative where women work on tailoring. They sew uniforms and household materials. Cooper was witness to the civil war in Liberia, coming from which she decided she wanted to help people.

Maia Kvaratskhelia is a 33-year-old woman who runs Avangard, an organization in Gali District, Abkhazia. Avangard consists of a group of doctors – gynecologists, pediatricians, and psychologists – who travel to villages to consult people, mostly girls and women. The organization travels to schools as well to educate young girls and boys about Human sexuality and women's issues which includes Bride kidnapping, a prominent issue in the region. Avangard also works with other pressing issues such as access to passports, early marriages, Sex-selective abortion and Reproductive health among many more.

== Additional information ==
The documentary explores the lives and journeys of three women in the aftermath of several years of war and strife in Iraq, Liberia and Georgia.

=== Experiences of Women in Iraqi Kurdistan ===
Lanja Abdullah, in the documentary, refers to the collective experience of people of Kurdistan, which is the homeland of Kurdish people and which was forcibly divided. As a result of this division, it lies mostly within the present-day borders of Turkey, Iraq and Iran, with smaller parts in Syria, Armenia and Azerbaijan. The documentary follows the violence perpetrated on Kurdish women in Erbil, Iraq. Kurds in Iraq exist in more than 4 million as a population, and comprise about 23 percent of the population. Under the Ba’ath regime of Saddam Hussein, the people of Iraq endured 35 years of repression and widespread human rights violations, of which the Kurdish population possibly experienced the worst. Additionally, after this there was the war between Iran and Iraq which further made things worse for the Kurdish population. The women in this population often face all kinds of physical abuses that either result in or force them to resort to self-immolation or hanging. According to a statement released by the Free Women's Organization of Kurdistan (FWOK), in 2014 alone there were 6,082 women killed or who committed suicide in Iraqi Kurdistan.

=== Women’s Education in Post Civil-War Liberia ===
Liberia has experienced two Civil Wars – The First Liberian Civil War was in 1989 and the Second Liberian Civil War was in 1999. Nelly Cooper in the documentary was witness to the wars and even had a 6-month-old baby during the evacuation of homes. Owing to the Civil War, many communities in Liberia have been subjected to extreme poverty. In 2010, more than 80% Liberians were surviving on less than $1.25 per day. Nelly relates in the documentary, that “many of the women’s husbands don’t work in Liberia. So the households are run by women.” Education of these women and other young girls is meant to be a “cornerstone” in the development of Liberia.

=== Women’s Healthcare and Bridal Kidnapping in Abkhazia ===
Gali, in Abkhazia, is a neglected region of Georgia and is sparsely populated compared to pre-war times. As a result of this, women's healthcare is also a neglected issue where one out of every five women has never had a routine health checkup of her child or herself. Many of these women have not seen a gynecologist for 15–20 years. There are also many instances of bride kidnapping that although not widespread, are still not condoned due to strong cultural beliefs and tradition. There seems to be two major types of bride kidnapping. First, where the girl is actually kidnapped against her will. Second, where the youth elope together to release the girl's family from any responsibility over her. Young women in many rural areas cannot protect themselves by relying on law enforcement officials because prosecutors reportedly habitually declined to indict the perpetrators for the kidnap, and instead told the victim or her parents to reconcile themselves to the fait accompli.

== Festivals ==
Nine libraries around the world own the documentary, according to WorldCat.

1. 20th Annual NAME Multicultural Film Festival–2014, Tucson AZ
2. London Feminist Film Festival
3. International Human Rights Film Festival, Albania
