= Temur Mzhavia =

Georgian politician

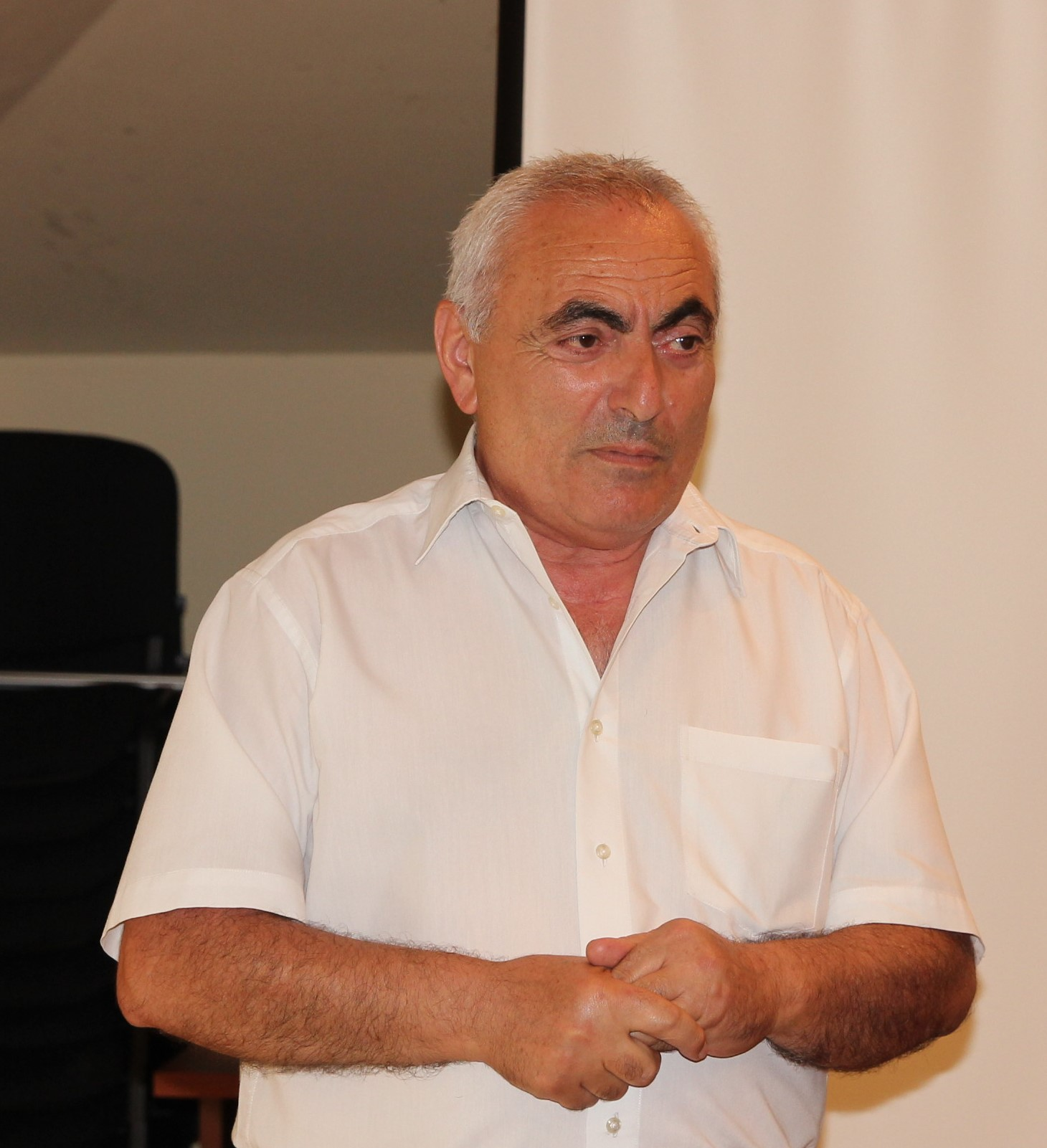

Temur Mzhavia was the Chairman of the Supreme Council of the de jure Government of the Autonomous Republic of Abkhazia. He left the position in 2009.

== See also ==
- 2006 Kodori crisis
- Battle of the Kodori Valley
