= 2004 Abkhazian local elections =

- 13 March 2004
- District, city, and settlement assemblies (3rd convocation)
| Party | Leader | Vote % | Seats | +/– |
|---|---|---|---|---|
| Independents / Local Candidates | | | | |
This lists parties that won seats. See the complete results below.

On 13 March 2004, Abkhazia held local elections for the 3rd convocations of its local assemblies, coinciding with early voting for the Russian presidential election of the following day. On 18 February, the People's Assembly rejected a proposal by President Vladislav Ardzinba to postpone the elections to coincide with the October 2004 presidential election, because all the necessary preparations had already been made.

In total, 243 candidates competed for 173 seats. In Sukhumi, 40 candidates competed for sixteen seats, most of whom were under thirty years old. In the Gagra district, 42 candidates were nominated, of whom 32 were registered, including six women, contesting 25 seats. In the Ochamchira District, 38 candidates were registered, including five women and sixteen incumbents. In the Gudauta District, 40 candidates were registered, including four women, contesting 29 seats. In the Gali District, 41 candidates were nominated.

158 out of 173 elections were decided in the first round. In Sukhumi, only six out of sixteen candidates were elected in the first round. Five elections required a second round while four elections had to be repeated. In Gudauta District, all but one of the 29 elections were decided in the first round. In Sukhumi District, all thirteen elections were decided in the first round.
