= Sergey Markedonov =

Sergey Miroslavovich Markedonov (Russian: Серге́й Мирославович Маркедонов; born 18 December 1972 in Rostov-on-Don) is Director of the Department for Problems of Ethnic Relations at the Institute for Political and Military Analysis in Moscow. He has received degrees in history and education from Rostov-on-Don State University and Rostov-on-Don State Pedagogical University, and has a Ph.D. in history.

Markedonov has written extensively on the Caucasus, Russia's Caucasian republics, and post-soviet conflicts in academic journals such as Central Asia and The Caucasus Journal of Social and Political Studies and Russia in Foreign Affairs. He has also given many interviews and published expert opinions on the subject in global media publications, including The New York Times, The Washington Post Russia Today, The Washington Times and RIA Novosti.
