= Ruslan Kishmaria =

Abkhazian politician

Ruslan Kishmaria is a politician from Abkhazia. Between May 1994 and 1997, and again from 1998 to March 2004, he was head of the Gali District. Between 1997 and 1998, Kishmaria was a deputy of the People's Assembly of Abkhazia. In 2004, Kishmaria unsuccessfully ran for Vice President alongside Anri Jergenia, finishing in fourth place with 2.63% of the vote.

On 4 May 2016, Kishmaria was awarded the Order of Leon by President Raul Khajimba.
