= Gali (town) =

Gali Abkhaz: Гал Mingrelian, Georgian: გალი
- Town
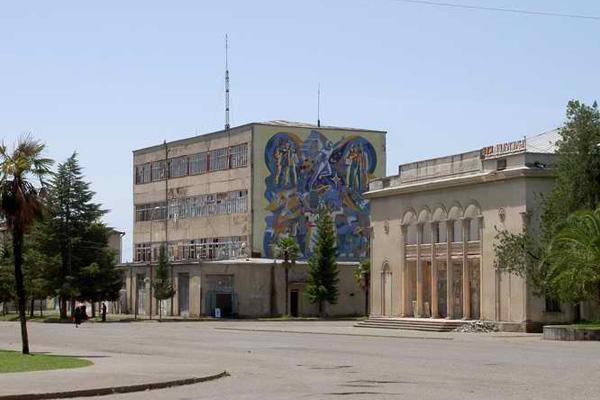
- Gali Centre

- Gali Gali (Abkhazia)
- Coordinates: 42°38′N 41°44′E
- Country (de facto): Abkhazia (Note: The political status of Abkhazia is disputed. Having unilaterally declared independence from Georgia in 1992, Abkhazia is formally recognised as an independent state by 4 UN member states (three other states previously recognised it but then withdrew their recognition), while the remainder of the international community recognizes it as de jure Georgian territory. Georgia continues to claim the area as its own territory, designating it as Russian-occupied territory.)
- Country (de jure): Georgia
- District: Gali

Population (2011)
  - Total: 7,605
- Time zone: UTC+3 (MSK)
  - Summer (DST): UTC+4
- Website: https://www.abkhazia.gov.ge/cities/GALI

Gali (Mingrelian and Georgian: გალი [ɡali]; Abkhaz: Гал, Gal) is a town in Abkhazia, Georgia, 77 km southeast of Sukhumi. It is the center of Gali District and was in the United Nations security zone prior to the Russian veto of the UNOMIG Mission in 2009. As of 2011 the town has a population of 7,605 inhabitants.

== History ==
Gali was granted town status in 1932.

On 15 April 1953, the newspaper Izvestia reported that the residents of Gali were celebrating the 132nd birthday of its oldest resident, Tlabgan Ketsba, and that he had founded the town in the 19th century.

== See also ==
- Gali Municipality
- Gali District
