= Gali District, Abkhazia =

Gali District გალის რაიონი (Georgian) Гал араион (Abkhaz) Гальский район (Russian)
- District
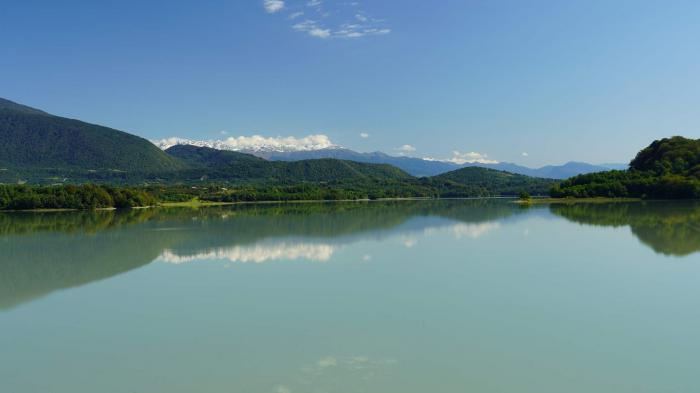
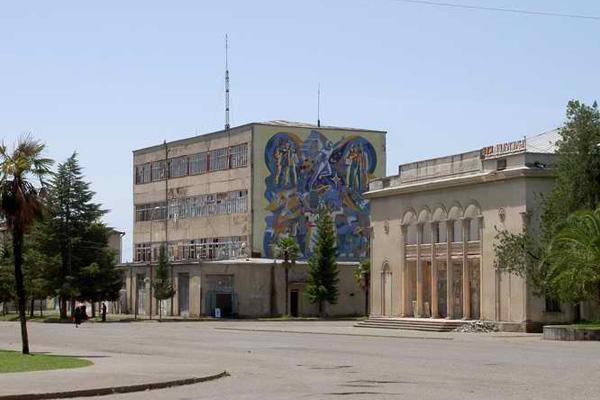
- Gali Reservoir and a view of Gali

- Coat of arms
- Location of Gali district in Abkhazia
- Country: Abkhazia (Note: The political status of Abkhazia is disputed. Having unilaterally declared independence from Georgia in 1992, Abkhazia is formally recognised as an independent state by 4 UN member states (three other states previously recognised it but then withdrew their recognition), while the remainder of the international community recognizes it as de jure Georgian territory. Georgia continues to claim the area as its own territory, designating it as Russian-occupied territory.)
- Capital: Gali

Government
  - Head of Administration: Konstatin Pilia

Area
  - Total: 518 km^{2} (200 sq mi)

Population (2022)
  - Total: 30,273 ▼: 98.20% Georgians; 2.8% Others
  - Density: 58.4/km^{2} (151/sq mi)
- Time zone: UTC+3 (MSK)
- Area differs from the administrative division of Georgia

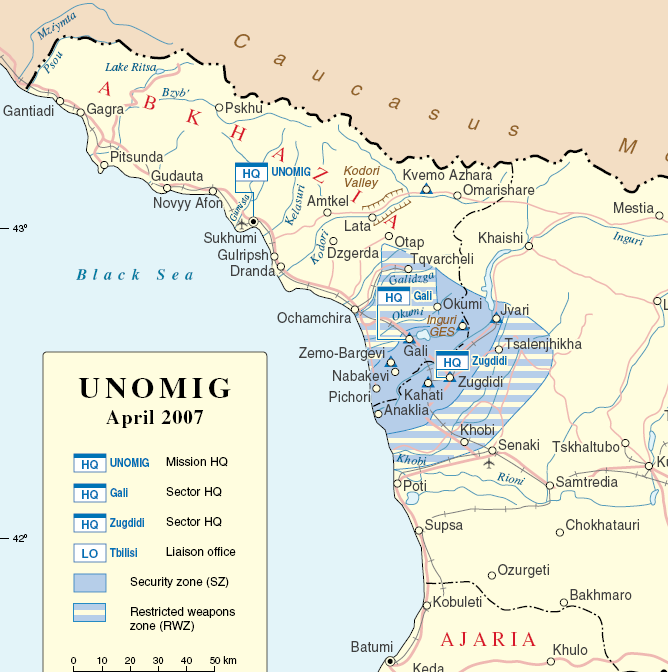
Gali District was largely in the UN security zone

Gali District is one of the districts of Abkhazia. (Note: The political status of Abkhazia is disputed. Having unilaterally declared independence from Georgia in 1992, Abkhazia is formally recognised as an independent state by 4 UN member states (three other states previously recognised it but then withdrew their recognition), while the remainder of the international community recognizes it as de jure Georgian territory. Georgia continues to claim the area as its own territory, designating it as Russian-occupied territory.) Its capital is Gali, the town by the same name. The district is smaller than the eponymous one in the de jure subdivision of Georgia, as some of its former territory is now part of Tkvarcheli District, formed by de facto Abkhaz authorities in 1995.

Gali District was populated almost entirely by Mingrelians, sub-group of ethnic Georgians, in the pre-war Abkhazia. The majority of Mingrelians fled the district following the inter-ethnic clashes in 1993–1994 and again in 1998. From 40,000 to 60,000 refugees have returned to Gali District since 1998, including persons commuting daily across the ceasefire line and those migrating seasonally in accordance with agricultural cycles. Gali District is now the only district of Abkhazia with ethnic Georgians constituting clear majority.

The population of the district was 29,287 according to the 2003 census conducted in Abkhazia but that figure is questioned by many international observers; it was estimated at 45 thousand in 2006 although Abkhazian authorities contested this number claiming that at least 65,000 refugees had returned.

Together with the Kodori Valley, Gali District is one of the two real troublespots while the situation is relatively peaceful in the rest of Abkhazia. It was a battlefield of the 1998 escalation of the Georgian-Abkhaz conflict.

== Etymology ==
The name "Gali" is a Russified form of the Kartvelian (Mingrelian) word "Ghali"(ღალი), which translates as "brook" or "gully"

== History ==
Historically, the present-day Gali District constituted the borderland between the principalities of Abkhazia and Samegrelo, the two breakaway feudal domains of the Kingdom of Georgia, and frequently changed its masters as the borders of these princedoms fluctuated during the dynastic feuds between the Shervashidze and Dadiani clans. In the second half of the 17th century, the Shervashidze princes of Abkhazia succeeded in conquering the territories up the Inguri River including the Gali District. With the dissolution of the Principality of Abkhazia c. 1700, the district between the Galidzga to the Inguri came to be ruled by a branch of the Shervashidze family whose one member, Murzakan, gave to his new fiefdom the name "Samurzakano" (i.e., "land of Murzakan"). The upper class of this new principality was composed chiefly of the Georgian-speaking Abkhaz nobility, whereas the peasants were of both Abkhaz and Georgian (Mingrelian) background. In contrast to the rest of Abkhazia largely Islamized under the Ottoman Empire, Samurzakano remained adherent to the Georgian Orthodox Christianity. Eventually the princedom came under the Mingrelian possession, but retained a degree of autonomy even after the expanding Imperial Russia established its protectorate over Mingrelia in 1804. In 1840, however, Russia outrightly annexed Samurzakano. In the 1860s–70s, the Abkhaz revolts and the systematic persecution of Muslim population at the hands of Russian authorities forced many Abkhaz to become Muhajirs to the Ottoman possessions. The Orthodox Christian population of Samurzakano remained relatively unaffected though. The decline in Abkhaz population left Mingrelian a dominant culture in the area. Furthermore, some Georgian peasants from the left bank of the Inguri River also emigrated to the right bank into Abkhazia where weaker practices of serfdom prevailed.

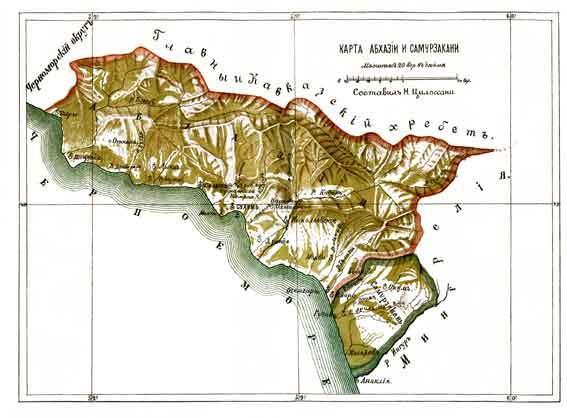
Samurzakan in 1899

The rate of intermarriages between the Georgians and Abkhaz was high that resulted in the mixed heritage of the district's population and the introduction of the special category "Samurzakanians" in the 1897 Imperial Russian census. This group was made up chiefly by the Mingrelians with a minority of Abkhaz. 38% and 35% of the district's population identified themselves as Mingrelian and Georgian respectively during the first Soviet census of 1926, with another 26% identifying themselves as Abkhaz. The latter group in Gali District declined greatly so that they formed only a few percent of its population. As the Soviet censuses carried out after 1926 didn't distinguish Georgians and Mingrelians as separate nationalities they together constituted the overwhelming majority in the district.

At the height of the secessionist war in Abkhazia in 1993, the Georgians of Gali were subjected to systematic ethnic cleansing at the hands of the Abkhaz militias and their allies from Russia's North Caucasian republics. By November 1993, most of the Gali District had been controlled by the secessionist with the exception of a few isolated enclaves evacuated by the Georgian forces according to the Russian-brokered ceasefire accord in 1994. Since then, some 40,000–60,000 Georgians have sporadically returned to the Gali District, but the process was significantly thwarted by the outbreak of hostilities in May 1998. In response to the attempt by the Georgian guerrillas to recover the area, the Abkhaz forces launched a large sweep into the district. Despite the criticism from opposition, Eduard Shevardnadze, President of Georgia, refused to deploy troops against Abkhazia. A ceasefire was negotiated on May 20, 1998. The hostilities resulted in hundreds of casualties on both sides and displaced an additional 30,000 – 40,000 Georgians. Although many families soon came back, the clashes left some 1,500 homes and infrastructure, including some that had been recently rehabilitated with international funding, in ruins. The United Nations Joint Assessment Mission to the Gali District confirmed, in 2000, that homes and infrastructure were deliberately burned and looted during the Abkhaz offensive.

== Demographics ==
According to 2003 census, the population of the district included:

- Georgians — 28.919 (98.7%)
- Russians — 159 (0.5%)
- Abkhaz — 121 (0.4%)
- other — 55 (0.4%)

According to 2011 census, the population of the district included:

- Georgians — 29.813 (98.2%)
- Abkhaz — 208 (0.7%)
- Russians — 188 (0.6%)
- other — 58 (0.3%)

== Human rights ==
In the Georgian-populated areas in Gali District, where local authorities are almost exclusively made up of ethnic Abkhaz, the human rights situation remains precarious. The United Nations and other international organizations have been fruitlessly urging the Abkhaz de facto authorities "to refrain from adopting measures incompatible with the right to return and with international human rights standards, such as discriminatory legislation… [and] to cooperate in the establishment of a permanent international human rights office in Gali and to admit United Nations civilian police without further delay."

The security situation in the district improved since February, 2006 and was generally calm in 2006. However, both Abkhaz and Georgian criminal networks continue to harass the locals. Georgia regularly criticizes the Abkhaz authorities and the Russian peacekeeping forces for failing to assure the local population's safety and prevent human rights abuses. It proposed, on February 3, 2003, to create a joint Georgian-Abkhaz administration in Gali, but the Abkhaz side rejected the proposal. The UNOMIG and Georgian side have proposed the deployment of a U.N. civilian police mission on both sides of the ceasefire line. Since 2003 U.N. police have been present on the Georgian-controlled side, but de facto Abkhaz authorities oppose their deployment in Gali, because it would undermine their own political authority.

Georgia has also reported several cases of forcible recruitment of Georgian returnees into the Abkhaz military, but the Sukhumi-based authorities categorically deny this, claiming that all citizens are obliged to serve, but no one is forcibly recruited. Threats made by Georgian security services (aimed at the prevention of the participation of the district's residents in the elections and against the inhabitants of the district working in its administration) were also reported.

After the Russian-Georgian war of August 2008, the situation in Gali significantly deteriorated with the Russian and Abkhaz military buildup and increased pressure on local Georgians from the Abkhaz authorities. In April 2009, the OSCE High Commissioner on National Minorities called om "the de facto authorities to put an end to the pressure being exercised on the Georgian population in the Gali District through the limitation of their education rights, compulsory "passportization", forced conscription into the Abkhaz military forces and restrictions on their freedom of movement."

On July 31, 2009, the breakaway region's Parliament passed amendment to the law making ethnic Georgians living in Gali District eligible for the Abkhaz citizenship. The move triggered wave of protest among opposition groups forcing the Parliament to revoke its decision on August 6.

In 2016, murder of ethnic Georgian Giga Otkhozoria by Abkhaz border guards caused international resonance and raised question about human rights situation of ethnic Georgians remaining in Abkhazia, particularly Gali district, where 98% is ethnic Georgian and is often subject to ethnic discrimination, denial of political and civil rights, police misconduct etc.

== Administration ==
On 11 February 1991, the Presidium of the Supreme Soviet of Georgia dismissed Rabo Shonia as District Soviet Chairman and appointed Edisher Janjulia as Prefect. The Supreme Soviet and the Soviet of Ministers of the Abkhazian ASSR subsequently condemned this decision as a violation of their authority and appealed to the Georgian Supreme Soviet to reconsider.

Ruslan Kishmaria was reappointed as Administration Head on 10 May 2001 following the March 2001 local elections.

After the March 2004 Assembly elections, Yuri Kvekveskiri was appointed Administration Head, while Kishmaria became Chairman of the Assembly. Kvekveskiri did not participate in the March 2007 elections, but remained acting Administration Head until Beslan Arshba was appointed as his successor on 23 May 2007.

On 2 June 2014, following the 2014 Abkhazian political crisis, acting President Valeri Bganba dismissed Beslan Arshba, as had been demanded by protesters, and appointed his Deputy Vakhtang Maan as acting District Head. After the election of Raul Khajimba as President, he on 11 November appointed Temur Nadaraia as Acting Head in Maan's stead.

=== List of district governors ===
| # | Name | From | Until | President | Comments |
|---|---|---|---|---|---|
Chairmen of the District Soviet:
| | Vakhtang Kolbaia | 1984 | 1990 | | |
| | Rabo Shonia | ? | 11 February 1991 | | |
Prefects:
| | Edisher Janjulia | 11 February 1991 | ? | | |
Heads of the District Administration:
| | Vazha Zarandia | December 1993 | April 1994 | | |
| | Ruslan Kishmaria | May 1994 | 26 November 1994 | | |
| | Ruslan Kishmaria | 26 November 1994 | 1997 | Vladislav Ardzinba | |
| | Valeri Lomia | 1997 | 1998 | Vladislav Ardzinba | |
| | Ruslan Kishmaria | 1998 | March 2004 | Vladislav Ardzinba | |
| | Yuri Kvekveskiri | March 2004 | 2005 | Vladislav Ardzinba | |
| | Yuri Kvekveskiri | 2005 | 23 May 2007 | Sergei Bagapsh | |
| | Beslan Arshba | 23 May 2007 | 26 September 2011 | Sergei Bagapsh | |
| | Beslan Arshba | 26 September 2011 | 2 June 2014 | Alexander Ankvab | |
| | Vakhtang Maan | 2 June 2014 | 11 November 2014 | Valeri Bganba | Acting |
| | Temur Nadaraia | 11 November 2014 | | Raul Khajimba | Acting |
| | Konstatin Pilia[ru] | July 2020 | 19 November 2024 | Aslan Bzhania | |
| | Konstatin Pilia[ru] | 19 November 2024 | Present | Badra Gunba | |

== Economy ==
External images
- Gali district countryside
- Street in Gali District

The Gali District is a rich agricultural area for tea, citrus, hazelnuts and vegetables. The Inguri hydroelectric station, a major supplier to Abkhazia and part of Georgia proper, is located on the Abkhaz-Georgian ceasefire line and is operated jointly.

Gali's residents are allowed to relatively freely cross into the neighboring Georgian districts, but must pay 50 Russian roubles. Customs fees are also levied upon any goods they are carrying into/out of Georgia proper. However, after the 2008 Russo-Georgian War, the cease-fire line has become more difficult to cross, with long delays at the checkpoint. As a result, the economic and trade links between the two sides of the cease-fire line, which formed the backbone of the resident's coping economies, became more strained.

The district's 2006 budget was 7.5 million Russian roubles ($300,000) but 30 per cent is tax revenue forwarded to Sukhumi. The remaining 70 per cent is spent on salaries, pensions and administration expenses. However, the district's budget does not include allocations from the central budget, which tend to be ad hoc, dependent on particular needs. The infrastructure remains in the state of collapse and, in spite of the limited international humanitarian aid, the majority of returnees continue to live in damaged houses or temporary shelters.
