= List of monuments in Gulripshi Municipality =

The monuments in the Gulripshi Municipality is a group of cultural heritage sites registered by the government of Georgia on the territory of a de jure territorial unit, which corresponds to the Gulripshi District in Abkhazia. (Note: The political status of Abkhazia is disputed. Having unilaterally declared independence from Georgia in 1992, Abkhazia is formally recognised as an independent state by 5 UN member states (two other states previously recognised it but then withdrew their recognition), while the remainder of the international community recognizes it as de jure Georgian territory. Georgia continues to claim the area as its own territory, designating it as Russian-occupied territory.)

The table lists a monument, its location and dating as well as the status attached to it by the Georgian authorities and the number assigned in the registry by the National Agency for Cultural Heritage Preservation of Georgia, which is available online as a GIS portal. The Agency broadly classifies the heritage sites into three groups: 1) the objects without a status, 2) immovable monuments of cultural heritage, and 3) immovable monuments of national significance.

Object	National Registry number	Date of construction	Location	Status	Image
Greek church of Azanta	7671	19th century	Azanta	Cultural Monument	
Azanta dolmen	7669	4th millennium BC-3rd millennium BC	Azanta	Cultural Monument	
Second dolmen of Azanta	7670	4th millennium BC-3rd millennium BC	Azanta	Cultural Monument	
Azanta Castle		Middle ages	Azanta		
Aleksandrovka church		12th-13th centuries	Aleksandrovka		
Aleksandrovka fortress	7668	16th-17th centuries	Aleksandrovka	Cultural Monument	
Azhara Castle		Middle ages	Azhara		
Achandara church	7684	19th century	Achandara	Cultural Monument	
Babushara church	3590	Middle ages	Babushara	Cultural Monument	
Babushara tower	7672	15th-16th centuries	Babushara	Cultural Monument	
Babushara Tskaba tower		16th-17th centuries	Babushara		
Baghmarani wall	7676	16th-18th centuries	Baghmarani	Cultural Monument	
Baghmarani cave			Baghmarani		
Domed church of Baghmarani	7675	1898	Baghmarani	Cultural Monument	
Hall church of Baghmarani	7674	Middle ages	Baghmarani	Cultural Monument	
Baghmarani church	7673	Middle ages	Baghmarani	Cultural Monument	
Second hall church of Baghmarani	7678	Middle ages	Baghmarani	Cultural Monument	
Baghmarani fortress	7677	16th-18th centuries	Baghmarani	Cultural Monument	
Greek Cemetery			Oktomberi		
The Greeks' Spring		19th century	Azanta		
Gulripshi garden	3589		Gulripshi	Cultural Monument	
Gulripshi church	7680		Gulripshi	Cultural Monument	
Dranda Cathedral	3591	6th-7th centuries	Dranda	Cultural Monument of National Significance	
Dranda church	7679	Middle ages	Dranda	Cultural Monument	
Church of the Archangel in Zemo Pshapi	7686	19th century	Zemo Pshapi	Cultural Monument	
Kelasuri Wall		6th century			
Kelasuri tower	7682	Middle ages		Cultural Monument	
Lata cemetery			Lata		
Lata Palace	7681	10th-15th centuries	Lata	Cultural Monument	
Lata Castle		Middle ages	Lata		
Marani church		Middle ages	Marani		
Ancient settlement of Machari		Brzonze age	Machara		
Machara Castle		Middle ages	Machara		
Merkheuli ancient cemetery		Iron age	Merkheuli		
Merkheuli Castle	7683	10th-15th centuries	Merkheuli	Cultural Monument	
Oktomberi wall		Middle ages	Oktomberi		
Oktomberi church		Middle ages	Oktomberi		
Church of Poltava-Aleksandrovskoye		1915	Poltava-Aleksandrovskoye		
Chernogovka fortress			Chernogovka		
Chkhalta church		Middle ages	Chkhalta		
Chkhalta fortress		Middle ages	Chkhalta		
Tsebelda fortress	7685	Middle ages	Tsebelda	Cultural Monument	
Church of St. Andrew the First-Called in Tsebelda		11th century	Tsebelda		
Church of St. George in Tsebelda		11th-12th centuries	Tsebelda		
Church of St. Catherine in Tsebelda		11th century	Tsebelda		
Church of St. Theodore in Tsebelda		11th century	Tsebelda		

== See also ==
- List of Cultural Heritage Monuments of Georgia
