= Lata (Abkhazia) =

Lata Лаҭ(a) (Abkhaz) ლათა (Georgian)
- Village
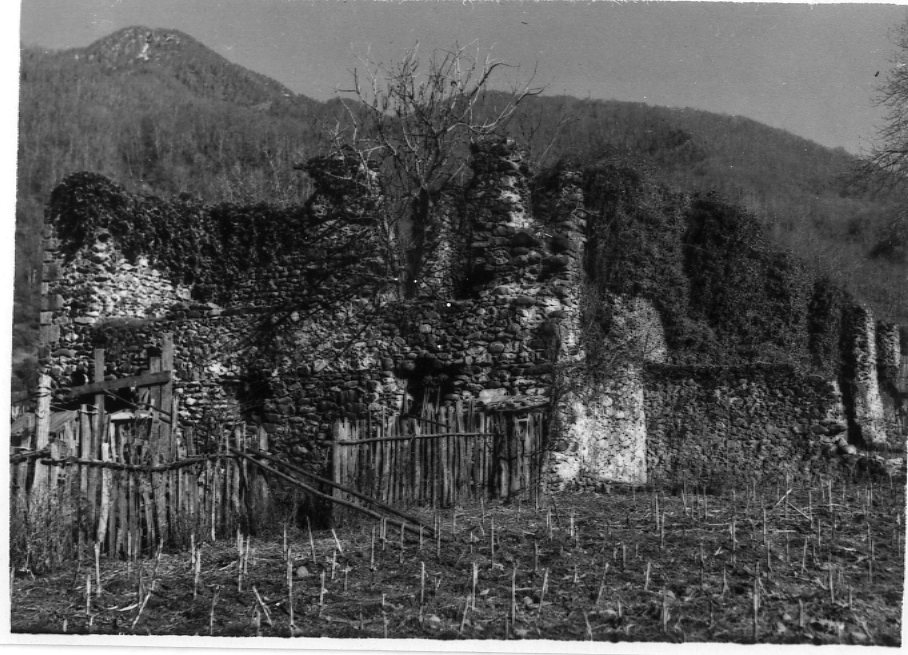
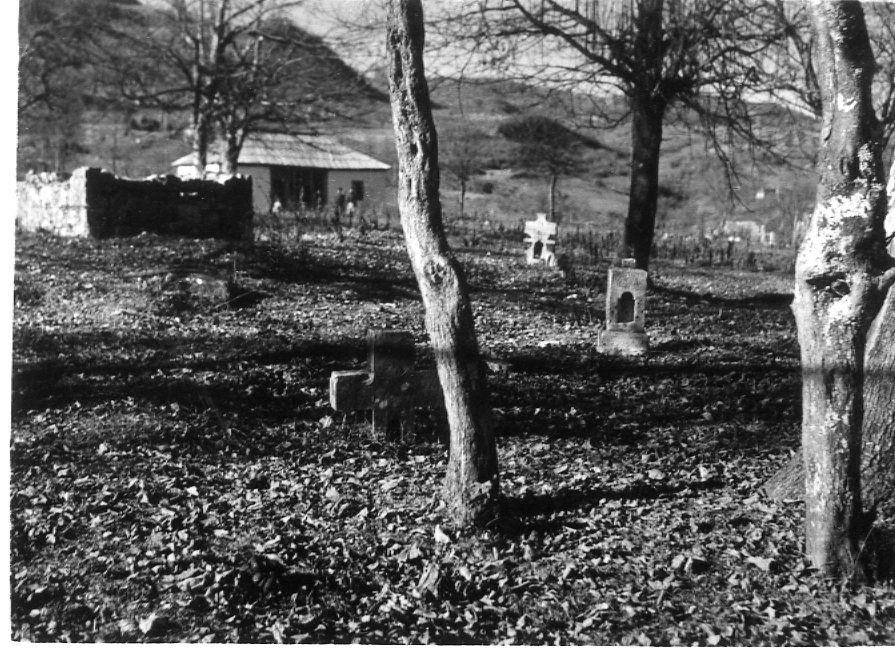
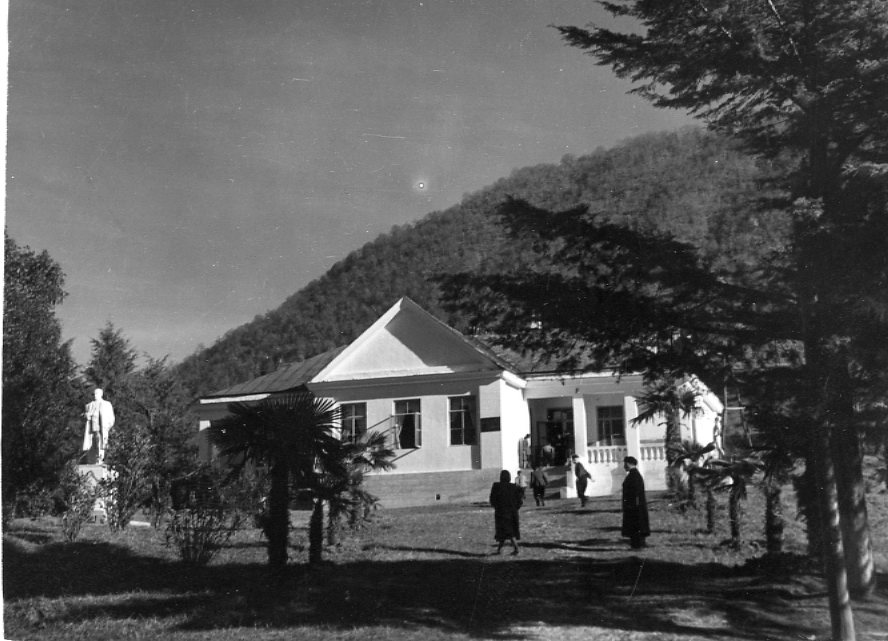
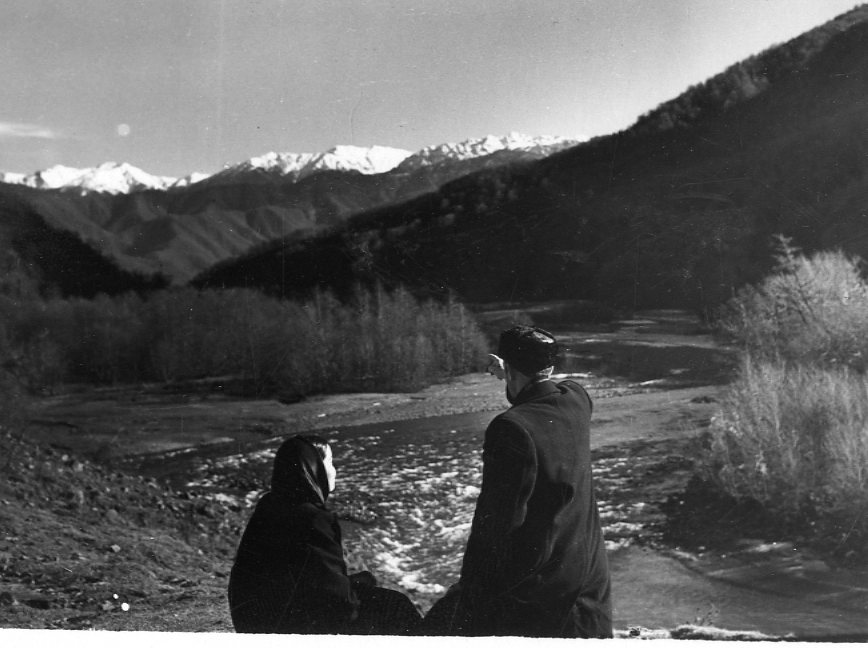
- Top left: the Lata Palace; top right: the village cemetery; bottom left: an unidentified building in the village; bottom right: two inhabitants atop a hill, overlooking a forest.

- Location in Abkhazia
- Coordinates: 43°01′58″N 41°28′48″E
- Country: Abkhazia/Georgia
- District: Gulripshi
- Elevation: 304 m (997 ft)

Lata (Georgian: ლათა, Abkhaz: Лаҭа/Лаҭ) is a village in the Gulripshi District of Abkhazia, a region with disputed status in Georgia. The village is located on the right bank of the Kodori River along the Sukhumi–Ochamchira road.

== Geography ==
Lata is situated in the Kodori Valley, or Upper Abkhazia, as the Georgian government refers to it. The village lies on the southern bank of the Kodori River and is approximately 52 km from Gulripshi, the district center.

The village has a humid subtropical climate typical of coastal Abkhazia, with mild winters and warm summers. Nearby Gulripshi averages 6°C in January and 23°C in July, with approximately 1,400 mm of annual rainfall.

== Administrative status ==
De jure, Lata is part of Georgia's Gulripshi Municipality in the Autonomous Republic of Abkhazia. De facto, it is controlled by the self-declared Republic of Abkhazia and administered as part of its Gulripshi District. The international community mostly recognizes Lata as part of Georgia, with only a few countries recognizing Abkhazia's independence.

== History ==
=== Early history ===
Lata appears on 19th-century maps and was noted in 1864 among Abkhaz muhajir settlements. In early Soviet records, it was part of the "Atara-Lata" community. In 1943, the Gulripshi District was created, including Lata.

=== Post-Soviet conflict ===
During the 1992–1993 War in Abkhazia, Lata came under Abkhaz control. On 14 December 1992, a Russian Mi-8 helicopter evacuating civilians was shot down over Lata, killing 85–87 people, mostly women and children. Georgian and Abkhaz sources differ on responsibility. It was also a site of the 1994 Kodori clashes in the War in Abkhazia (1992-1993).

== Demographics ==
No reliable post-war census exists. Pre-1992, the village was majority ethnic Georgian, possibly with small numbers of Abkhazians and Armenians.

== Culture and landmarks ==
The village of Lata and its immediate surroundings are home to several significant historical sites dating back to the Middle Ages. Notable among these is the Lata Palace, a medieval stone and brick complex featuring seven interconnected sections and an early water reservoir system. In the same vicinity lies the Lata Castle, a ruined fortification situated on a cliff overlooking a local waterfall. Architectural analysis of limestone slabs and pottery fragments at the castle site suggest it was active between the 11th and 14th centuries. Additionally, the village maintains an old cemetery characterized by historic grave markers that reflect the region's long-standing funerary traditions.
