= Lata operation =

- Part of the War in Abkhazia (1992–1993)
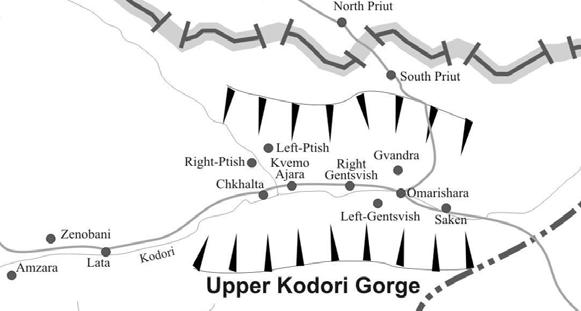
- A map of Upper Kodori, showing the location of Lata
Date	24–29 March 1994 (Note: The war had officially ended by then, but clashes continued.)
Location	Lata, Kodori Gorge 43.1064°N 41.7356°E
Result	Abkhazian victory, see Aftermath
Territorial changes	Ceasefire line set under Lata; Tsebelda, Kvabchara, and two "additional villages" under Abkhaz control Georgian forces withdraw to the Upper Kodori Gorge

Belligerents
Abkhazia; CMPC	(Georgia (country)) Georgia

Commanders and leaders
Sultan Sosnaliyev (Note: Overall commander of the operation) (Abkhazia) Ruslan Dzheliya (WIA) (Note: Field commander of the operation) (Abkhazia) Sergei Matosyan (WIA)	Unknown

Units involved
Abkhazian Armed Forces: 3rd Regiment of the Eastern Front; Bagramyan Battalion	Local Svan formations

Strength
238 fighters assembled for the operation: 107 fighters participated in the assault on Lata	2 battalions, a tank, and 2 armored vehicles

Casualties and losses
Abkhazians: "Almost none"; Bagramyan Battalion: At least 6 killed and 11 wounded	1 armored vehicle with a Shilka captured
- At least 10 killed and 22 injured
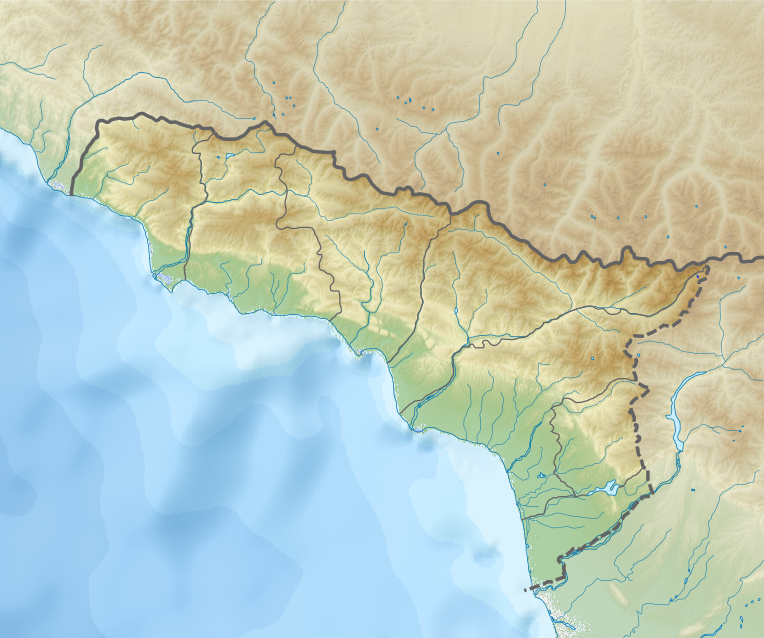
- Location within Abkhazia

The Lata operation (as it is known in Abkhazian sources) was a military engagement that took place on 25 March 1994 during the period of continued instability following the War in Abkhazia. Abkhaz and allied forces successfully expelled Georgian troops from the village of Lata, a strategic point located east of Sukhumi in the Kodori Valley.

== Background ==
After the 1993 September Offensive, the war had mostly ended. However, several clashes still occurred in the region. Although a formal ceasefire had been signed in December 1993, localized fighting continued throughout early 1994 as Abkhaz forces sought to consolidate control over the remaining Georgian-held enclaves in the Gulripshi District.

The strategic situation remained volatile as the village of Lata served as the primary "gateway" to the Kodori Valley, the final region of Abkhazia remaining under the contested control of the Georgian government. Throughout February and early March 1994, regional tensions escalated as Abkhaz forces conducted operations to secure perceived borders and neutralize remaining Georgian paramilitary groups. The village also held symbolic weight due to the 1992 Lata tragedy, where a humanitarian helicopter was shot down by a surface-to-air missile, killing around 80 refugees, many of whom were women evacuated from the besieged city (of which 8 were pregnant) and 35 children.

== Military operations ==
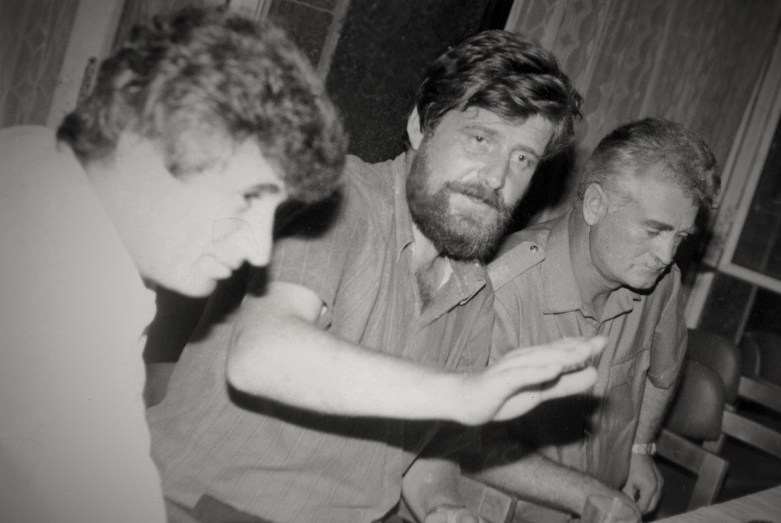
(Left to right) Sergei Matosyan, Ruslan Kishmaria, and Sultan Sosnaliyev in 1993

The Abkhazians, having taken Sukhumi months prior, were stationed in and around the city. Heading from the heights captured in previous offensives, Abkhaz forces launched an offensive that aimed to drive the Georgian troops out of the village of Lata.

On 17 March 1994, the commander of the "Groza" (Thunderstorm) group, Ruslan Dzheliya, was appointed commander of the 3rd Regiment of the Eastern Front. Two days later, Eastern Front commander V. Anua ordered him to capture the village of Lata. Abkhaz fighters travelled by vehicle to the area, where the participating detachments—numbering 238 fighters—were assembled and Dzheliya was formally appointed field commander of the operation. The same evening, the combined force moved toward Lata with the help of a local guide, though the order to begin the assault did not arrive until 24 March.

According to participant accounts, the Abkhaz detachments endured severe conditions while waiting in the mountains. Snow covered the heights, strong winds blew through the Kodori Gorge, and food supplies were limited. On 22 March, prior to the start of the offensive, Dzheliya and seven fighters reportedly infiltrated the Georgian rear positions for reconnaissance.

The operation to capture Lata began on 24 March 1994 under the overall leadership of Minister of Defense Sultan Sosnaliyev. The Abkhazian command employed a two-pronged simultaneous attack to bypass the heavily defended road tunnels. The main force, which included the Bagramyan Battalion, launched a frontal assault from the direction of Tsebelda along the right bank of the Kodori River. Simultaneously, a second Abkhazian detachment moved from Ochamchira, advancing from the village of Aimara and crossing the high Panai Range to strike from the rear.

On 24 March, 107 Abkhaz fighters advanced on Lata, leading to intense fighting inside the village. Under Georgian fire, Dzheliya and his fighters crossed a suspension bridge over the Kodori River. During the crossing, he reportedly removed three anti-tank grenades while under fire. By evening, Abkhaz forces had captured the school and central section of Lata, as well as an armored vehicle equipped with a Shilka anti-aircraft system. Fighting continued deeper into the village, during which Dzheliya was wounded in the knee. Georgian forces were eventually pushed back toward Upper Lata.

One participant in the operation, Tuyba Daur Shalikovich, later recalled that the fighters operated in freezing conditions with little food and constant wind throughout the battle, while Dzheliya personally advanced at the front of his detachment during the fighting.

On 25 March, Abkhaz forces successfully drove Georgian troops out of Nizhnaya Lata, east of Sukhumi. Following the retreat, the Abkhazian side issued an ultimatum to Georgian troops elsewhere in Abkhazia to surrender immediately. Despite the ongoing military movement, on the same day the UN Security Council extended the mandate of its observer mission until 30 June, calling for a resumption of deadlocked negotiations.

The offensive continued through 26–27 March, with Abkhaz forces moving further into Svaneti, occupying two additional villages and shelling Georgian villages in the Gali district, where the Georgians had about 100 soldiers.

On 24–25 May 1994, Georgian and local Svan formations attempted a counter-offensive. The Georgian units attempted a flanking maneuver over the mountain ranges through the village of Kvabchara. The movement was detected by the Bagramyan Battalion, leading to a close-contact battle. The Georgian forces were eventually repelled back into the mountains. The Armenian battalion suffered 6 killed and 11 wounded during this engagement.

== Aftermath ==
The engagement at Lata in late March 1994 was one of the final significant military actions of the conflict's active phase. The capture of the village by Abkhaz forces effectively consolidated their control over the lower Kodori Valley and pressured the Georgian side back to the negotiating table. Following this escalation, international mediation intensified. On 4 April 1994, the parties signed the Agreement on a Cease-fire and Separation of Forces in Moscow, which outlined steps for the return of refugees and a permanent end to hostilities. This was followed by the formal Moscow Agreement on 14 May 1994, which established a security zone and deployed CIS peacekeeping forces to the region.

Despite Abkhaz advances, the Georgian side continued to contest control over Abkhazia, asserting that the territory was part of newly independent Georgia and that the outcome of the war had compromised its territorial integrity. Abkhaz forces did not fully control the Gali district, where guerrilla activity persisted, and Georgia retained authority over the upper Kodori Valley. These areas became the main entry points for continued post-war fighting.

Under the 1994 agreements, heavy weaponry was withdrawn from Gali, but low-level violence continued. Abkhaz police carried out border guard duties, supported by army regulars and reservists, while Abkhaz positions were regularly targeted from across the Inguri River, leading to intermittent clashes and casualties. Landmines and obstructions along the river hampered the return of displaced Georgians. Georgian troops and equipment were withdrawn from the upper Kodori Valley, while Abkhaz forces maintained a post in the lower valley near Lata. Local Svan populations opposed the withdrawal, fearing it "would leave them vulnerable to an Abkhaz attack" and considering the small peacekeeping presence insufficient. Some residents refused to submit to Georgian authority and formed militias, prompting joint Georgian army and police operations as late as July 2006.
