= Irakli Geperidze =

Georgian footballer

Irakliy Geperidze Ираклий Геперидзе
Personal information
- Date of birth: 14 February 1987 (age 39)
- Place of birth: Merkheul, Gulripshi District, Georgian SSR
- Height: 1.75 m (5 ft 9 in)
- Positions: Midfielder; forward

Senior career*
Years	Team	Apps	(Gls)
2002–2003	FC Torpedo-Metallurg Moscow	0	(0)
2004–2005	FC Saturn Moscow Oblast (reserves)		
2006	FC Spartak Nizhny Novgorod	4	(0)
2006	PFC Spartak Nalchik	2	(0)
2007	FC Torpedo Moscow	8	(0)
2008	Maccabi Petah Tikva F.C.	12	(0)
2008–2009	Hapoel Haifa F.C.	32	(11)
2009	AEP Paphos FC	4	(0)
2010–2011	Maccabi Herzliya F.C.	29	(4)
2011	FC Lokomotiv-2 Moscow	13	(2)
2014–2015	Ulisses FC	12	(2)
2015	FC Torpedo Armavir	15	(0)
- * Club domestic league appearances and goals

Irakliy Geperidze (Russian: Ираклий Геннадович Геперидзе; born 14 February 1987) is a Georgian former professional football player. He also holds Russian citizenship.
