= Khutia =

Khutia Georgian: ხუტია, Abkhaz: Хутия
- Village
- Location within Georgia Location within Abkhazia
- Coordinates: 43°06′45″N 41°49′06″E
- Country: Georgia
- Partially recognized independent country: Abkhazia
- District: Gulripshi
- Time zone: UTC+4 (GST)

Khutia (Georgian: ხუტია; Abkhaz: Хутия) is a village in Gulripshi District of Abkhazia, a breakaway region of Georgia. In 2002 the population was 101 (96% Georgians). Before 2008 it was occupied by Russia.

== Literature ==
- Georgian Soviet Encyclopedia
