= 1992 Russian Air Force Mil Mi-8 shootdown =

Lata tragedy 1992 Russian Air Force Mi-8 shootdown
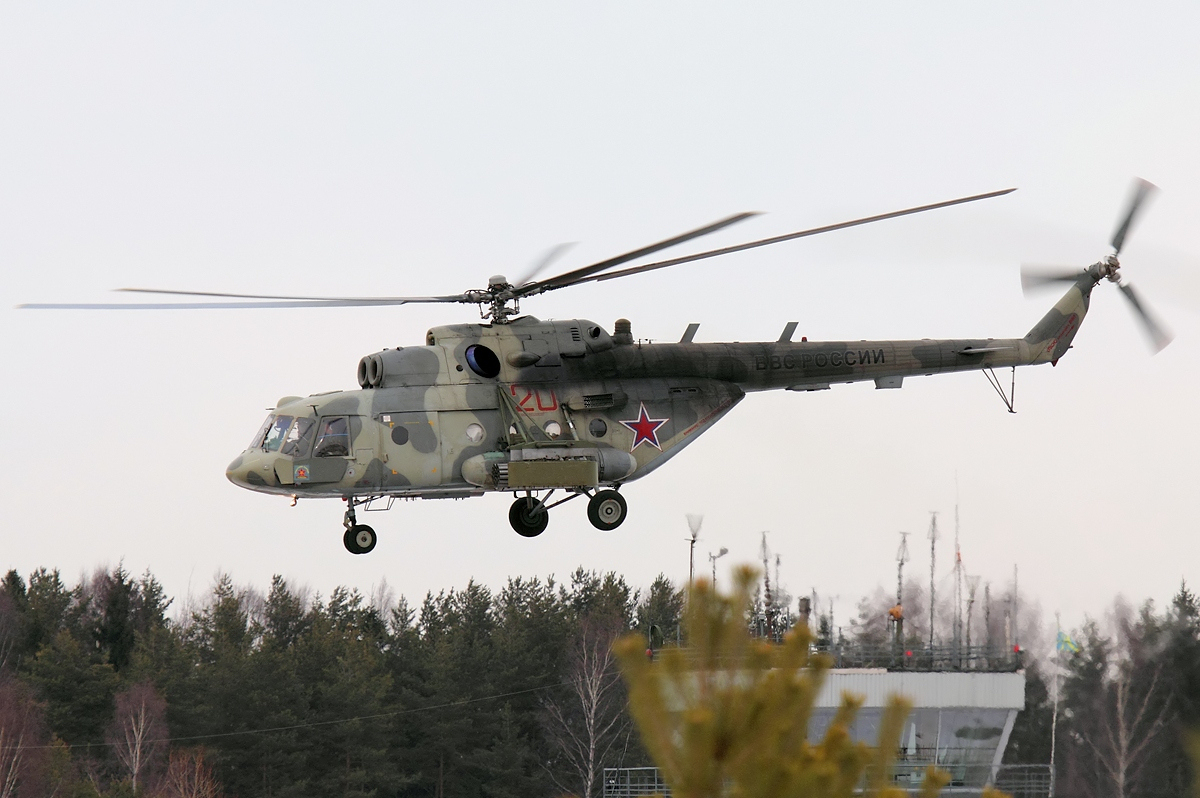
- A Russian Air Force Mil Mi-8, similar to the aircraft involved.

Shootdown
- Date: 14 December 1992
- Summary: Russian Air Force Mi-8 shot down
- Site: Lata, Abkhazia

Aircraft
- Aircraft type: Mil Mi-8
- Operator: Russian Armed Forces
- Flight origin: Tkvarcheli
- Destination: Gudauta
- Occupants: 81-87
- Fatalities: 81-87
- Survivors: 0

A Russian Air Force Mil Mi-8 helicopter operated by the Russian Armed Forces was performing a civilian flight from Tkvarcheli to Gudauta when on December 14, 1992 it was shot down over the village of Lata, in Gulripshi District of Abkhazia, during the War in Abkhazia. All those in the military helicopter died: according to various media reports, around 80 people, many of whom were women evacuated from the besieged city (of which 8 were pregnant) and 35 children. This incident is often called the Lata tragedy. The dead are buried in Gudauta.
