= Merkheuli Palace =

Ruined mansion in the village of Merkheuli, Abkhazia

The Palace of Merkheuli
- მერხეულის მარღანიების სასახლე (Georgian)
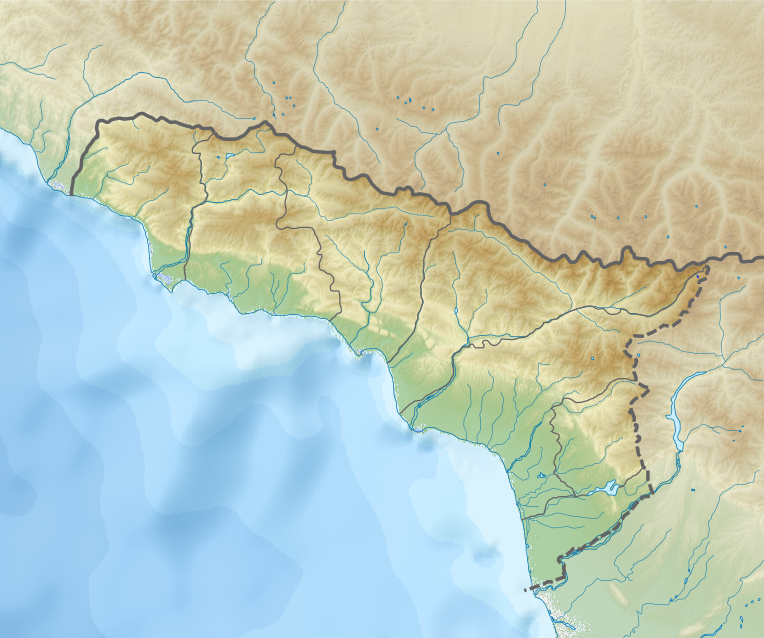
- Location within Abkhazia Location within Georgia
- 42°59′30″N 41°10′10″E
- Location: (Georgia (country)) Gulripshi Municipality, Autonomous Republic of Abkhazia, Georgia

Site notes
- Area: Gulripshi Municipality

The Palace of Merkheuli (Georgian: მერხეულის მარღანიების სასახლე) is a ruined mansion in the village of Merkheuli in the Gulripshi municipality, Abkhazia, an entity in the South Caucasus with a disputed political status. It is commonly attributed to the Marghania (also known as Maan, Marghan), a clan of local nobles.

== History ==
The ruins stand at the north-east outskirts of Merkheuli. It consists of a stone building on a small plateau — remains of a nobleman's "palace" — and a set of fortified walls and a small tower dominating a small stream defile leading to the building. The entire complex can roughly be dated to the 15th century.
