= Machara =

Machara მაჭარა, Мачара, Մաճարա
- Village
- Location within Georgia Location within Abkhazia Location within Gulripshi District
- Coordinates: 42°56′39″N 41°5′21″E
- Country: Georgia
- Partially recognized independent country: Abkhazia
- District: Gulripshi

Population (2011)
  - Total: 2,640
- Time zone: UTC+3 (MSK)
  - Summer (DST): UTC+4

Machara (Georgian: მაჭარა; Abkhaz: Мачара Armenian: Մաճարա) is a village in the Gulripshi District of Abkhazia. It is located on the Black Sea coast on the Machara River around 8km east from the capital Sukhum and around 2km from the district centre of Gulrypsh.

== Demographics ==
At the time of the 2011 census, the village of Machara had a population of 2,640. Of these, 66.8% were Armenian, 23.7% Abkhaz, 6.5% Russian, 1.0% Georgian, 0.8% Greek and 0.3% Ukrainian. Due to the efforts on the State Committee of Repatriation of the Abkhazian Government, the Abkhaz population in the village has been increasing in recent years due to the resettlement of repatriate families of the Abkhazian Diaspora (Usually from Turkey and Syria). In 2024 and 2025, 48 Repatriated members of the Abkhaz Diaspora received keys to new apartments in the village of Machara. In the village of Machara this has been occurring since at least 2012, with on the 30 May 2012, 37 repatriated members of the Abkhaz diaspora and their families received restored apartments in Machara. Most of these apartments went to repatriates from Turkey, Syria as well as small numbers from Karachay-Cherkessia and Adjara.

== Armenian Community of Abkhazia ==
The village of Machara held the republican congress of the Armenian Community of Abkhazia on February the 19th 2026, this congress was attended by 249 delegates from all over Abkhazia as well as President Badra Gunba, Members of Parliament and the Head of the Gulripsh district. During this congress, Alik Minosyan was unanimously re-elected as head of the Armenian Community of Abkhazia, which he has been in the position since 2023.

== See also ==
- Machara Castle
- Gulripshi District
