= Dranda =

Dranda დრანდა (Georgian) Дранда (Abkhaz) Դրանդա (Armenian) Дранда (Russian)
- Village
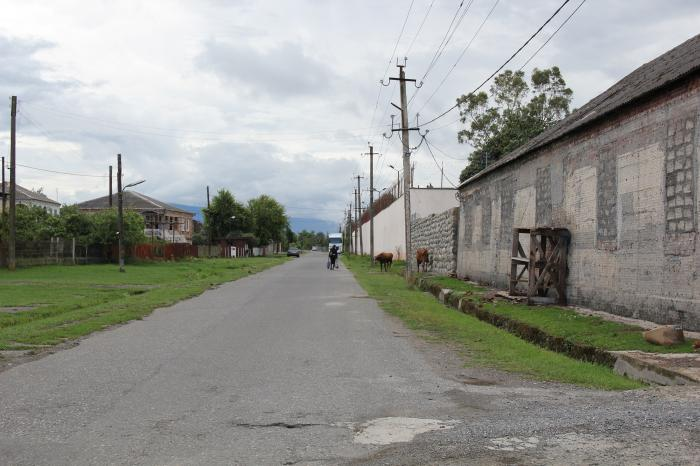
- Dranda

- Location of Dranda in Abkhazia Location of Dranda in Georgia
- Coordinates: 42°52′27″N 41°09′44″E
- Country (de jure): Georgia
- Country (de facto): Abkhazia (Note: The political status of Abkhazia is disputed. Having unilaterally declared independence from Georgia in 1992, Abkhazia is formally recognised as an independent state by 4 UN member states (three other states previously recognised it but then withdrew their recognition), while the remainder of the international community recognizes it as de jure Georgian territory. Georgia continues to claim the area as its own territory, designating it as Russian-occupied territory.)
- Settled: 6th century BC

Population (2011)
  - Total: 3,205
- Time zone: UTC+4 (MSK)
- Postal code: 384900
- Area code: +7 840 22x-xx-xx
- Vehicle registration: ABH

Dranda (Georgian: დრანდა; Abkhaz: Дранда; Armenian: Դրանդա; Russian: Дранда) is a town located in Gulripshi District near the Black Sea, about 20 km (12 mi) from the capital Sukhumi and about 7 kilometers from Gulripshi. The town is near Sukhumi-Babushara Airport, which was reopened in 2008. In Dranda itself there is an Orthodox cathedral from the 6th century.

== Dranda Cathedral ==
Built around 551 by emperor Justinian I In the Georgian Orthodox Catholicate of Abkhazia, during the Middle Ages Dranda served as the seat of bishops. During the Turkish occupation, the temple suffered great damage, but was later restored. In 1880, a monastery was established at the cathedral. After the Red Army invasion of Georgia in 1921, the Georgian Orthodox Church was subjected to intense harassment.

== Population ==
In 1830, Dranda was believed to be home to 100 households. By 1877, the population numbered 455 households and a total of 2,147 people. The entire population fled to the Ottoman Empire following the conclusion of the Russo-Turkish War (1877-1878). By 1886, village was home to only 276 residents, mostly Mingrelian and Moldovan settlers. The community would not regain a significant Abkhaz population until after the war. In 1989 Dranda had 2,673 inhabitants, this number rose to over 3,200 by 2011. This makes Dranda one of the few places in Abkhazia whose population is higher than the figure from the last Soviet census. The majority of the population consists of Armenians (51.0%) and Abkhazians (36.3%), as well as Russians (7.1%) and Georgians (3.7%). Smaller minorities include Greeks (0.7%) and Ukrainians (0.5%).

== Notable people ==
- Yuri Vardimiadi (1925–1956), footballer
