= Machara Castle =

- მაჭარა, Мачара
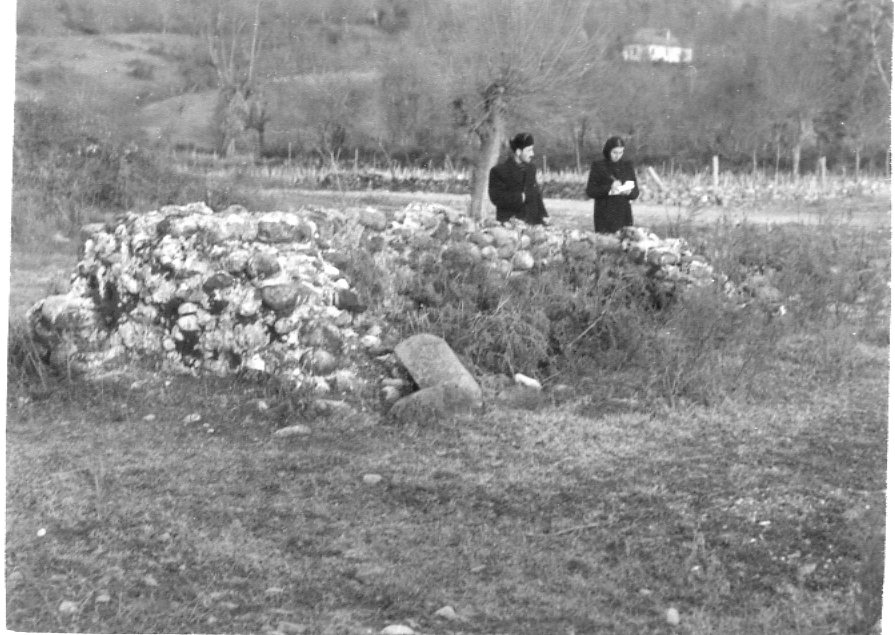

- Location within Gulripshi District Machara Castle (Abkhazia) Machara Castle (Georgia)

General information
- Coordinates: 42°57′8.81″N 41°6′4.61″E

Machara Castle (Georgian: მაჭარის ციხესიმაგრე) is a castle in the village of Machara, Gulripshi Municipality, Autonomous Republic of Abkhazia, Georgia. The castle was built in the Middle Ages. The castle walls are in a poor physical condition and need an urgent conservation.

== See also ==
- Machara
