= Dranda Cathedral =

Georgian Orthodox Cathedral in Abkhazia

Dranda Cathedral დრანდის ტაძარი (in Georgian) Нанҳәа иазку (in Abkhaz)
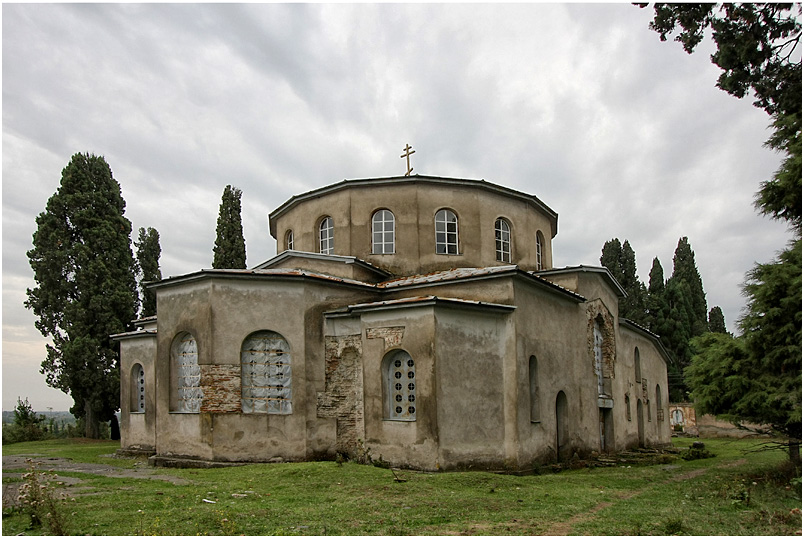
- Dranda Cathedral, before its reconstruction September 2008

- Location within Abkhazia Location within Georgia

Religion
- Affiliation: Georgian Orthodox
- Province: Abkhazia
- Rite: Eastern
- Ecclesiastical or organisational status: Cathedral
- Year consecrated: 2002 (reconsecration)

Location
- Location: (Georgia (country)) Dranda (De jure); Dranda (De facto) Gulripshi District Abkhazia, Georgia
- Coordinates: 42°52′27″N 41°09′44″E

Architecture
- Type: Byzantine, Georgian; Cathedral
- Style: Georgian cross-dome
- Founder: Possibly Justinian I
- Groundbreaking: Possibly early-mid 6th century.
- Completed: Possibly 551
- Construction cost: Unknown
- Immovable Cultural Monument of National Significance of Georgia
- Designated: November 7, 2006; 19 years ago
- Reference no.: 3591
- Item Number in Cultural Heritage Portal: 9296
- Date of entry in the registry: October 3, 2007; 18 years ago

Dranda Cathedral (Georgian: დრანდის ტაძარი; Abkhaz: Нанҳәа иазку Дранда-ныха) is a Georgian Orthodox Cathedral located in Dranda, in the Gulripshi District of the de facto independent Republic of Abkhazia, internationally recognized to constitute a part of Georgia.

== History ==
According to the Roman historian Procopius of Caesarea, in 551 emperor Justinian I built a temple in these environs; this is believed by some to have been what is now the cathedral in Dranda. In the Georgian Orthodox Catholicate of Abkhazia, during the Middle Ages Dranda served as the seat of bishops. During the Turkish occupation, the temple suffered great damage, but was later restored.

Russian and Georgian historian, archaeologist and ethnographer Dmitry Bakradze, visiting the Dranda Cathedral in 1860, reported that the temple was painted with frescoes. However, over time they completely collapsed and were not restored during the restoration of the temple.

In 1880, a monastery was established at the cathedral After the Red Army invasion of Georgia in 1921, the Georgian Orthodox Church was subjected to intense harassment. Hundreds of churches were closed by the Soviet government and hundreds of monks were imprisoned and killed during Joseph Stalin's purges.

There has been some restoration on the exterior walls of the structure and roof, covering with stucco much of the original brick architecture that was once visible. Small portions may still be seen in what was intentionally left untouched.

== Architectural features ==
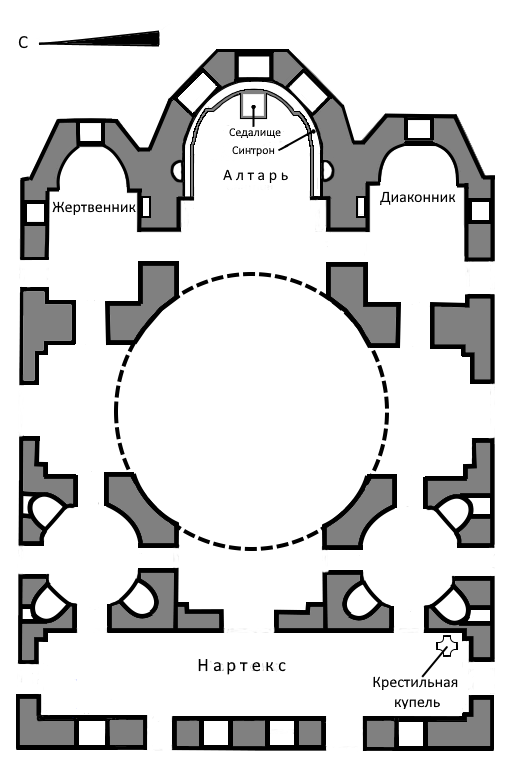
A reconstruction plan of the cross-domed church

The cathedral belongs to the cross-domed type, which was formed in Byzantine architecture in the 5th - 8th centuries. The three pentagonal apses adjacent to the east include an altar, a deacon and an altar, which in the western part of the temple correspond to two semi-circular rooms with niches. On the west, the temple ends with a vestibule. The dome of the temple is erected on a low sixteen-sided drum.

In the early 20th century, the building was rebuilt. During the reconstruction of the church, the "onion head" characteristic of Russian monuments of wooden construction was erected on the dome, the windows were expanded, a wooden patronymic was placed in the west, the inside and outside were whitewashed with lime, etc. The interior and exterior decoration of the monument changed its original architectural appearance, with the addition of a bell tower. A tunnel (length 260–280 m) started near the western wall of the church, which went down to the Kodori River. In this tunnel, at the end of the 19th century, a marble slab with a relief image of the Savior was discovered, and another slab with the image of the Savior and the Mother of God was also recovered (photos were published by P. Uvarova).

In 1917, a hospital and a hotel were located on the territory of the monastery; There was also an orchard and a large garden. After the establishment of the Soviet government in Georgia, and the strengthening of the anti-religious campaign, Drandi Monastery was closed in 1924. A prison was opened in the monastic buildings, which is still functioning today, and the administration of Gulrifshi district and a boarding school were placed in a part of it.

On 10 February 2011, the Government of Abkhazia transferred the cathedral to the Abkhaz Orthodox Church for free and for indefinite use. The result of this was the loss of some original elements of ancient architecture, including the destruction of the remains of one of the few surviving baptismal churches of the 6th-7th centuries, on the site of which a new concrete font was built.

== Gallery ==
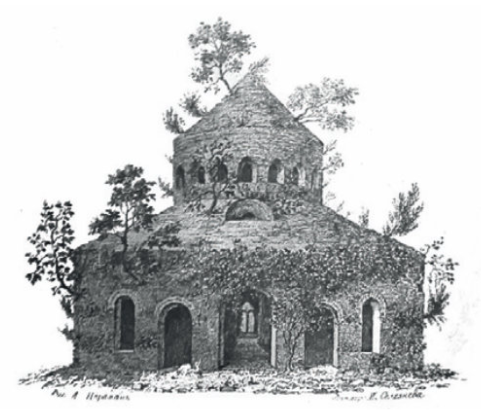
Assumption Cathedral Lithograph from a drawing by A.D. Nordman, c.1835.

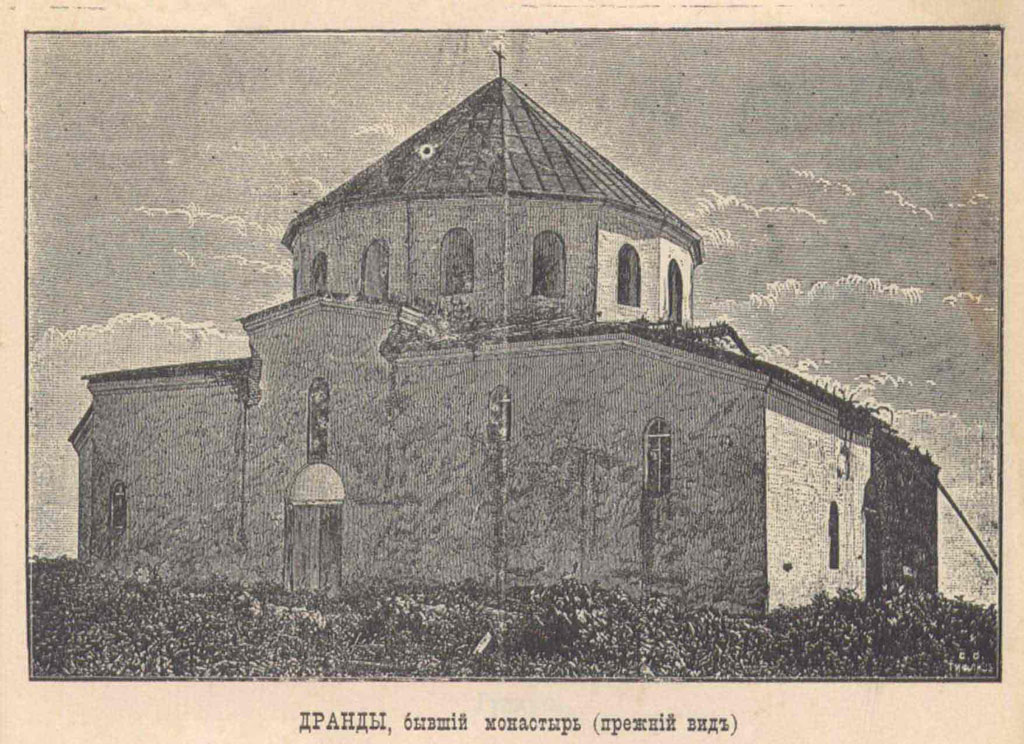
Cathedral with its original roof ca. 1900

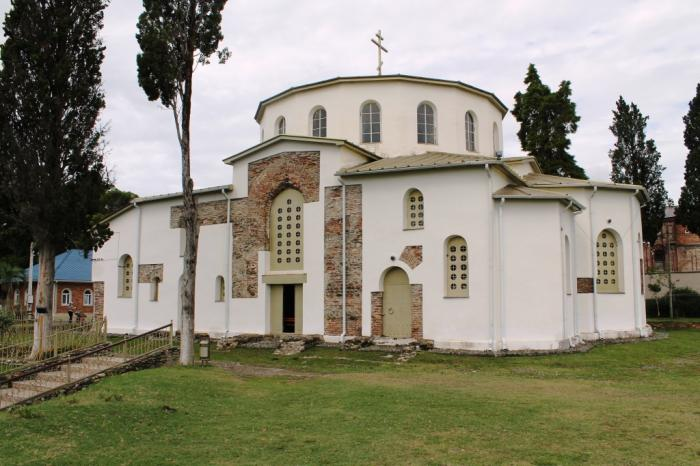
The exterior walls, 2010

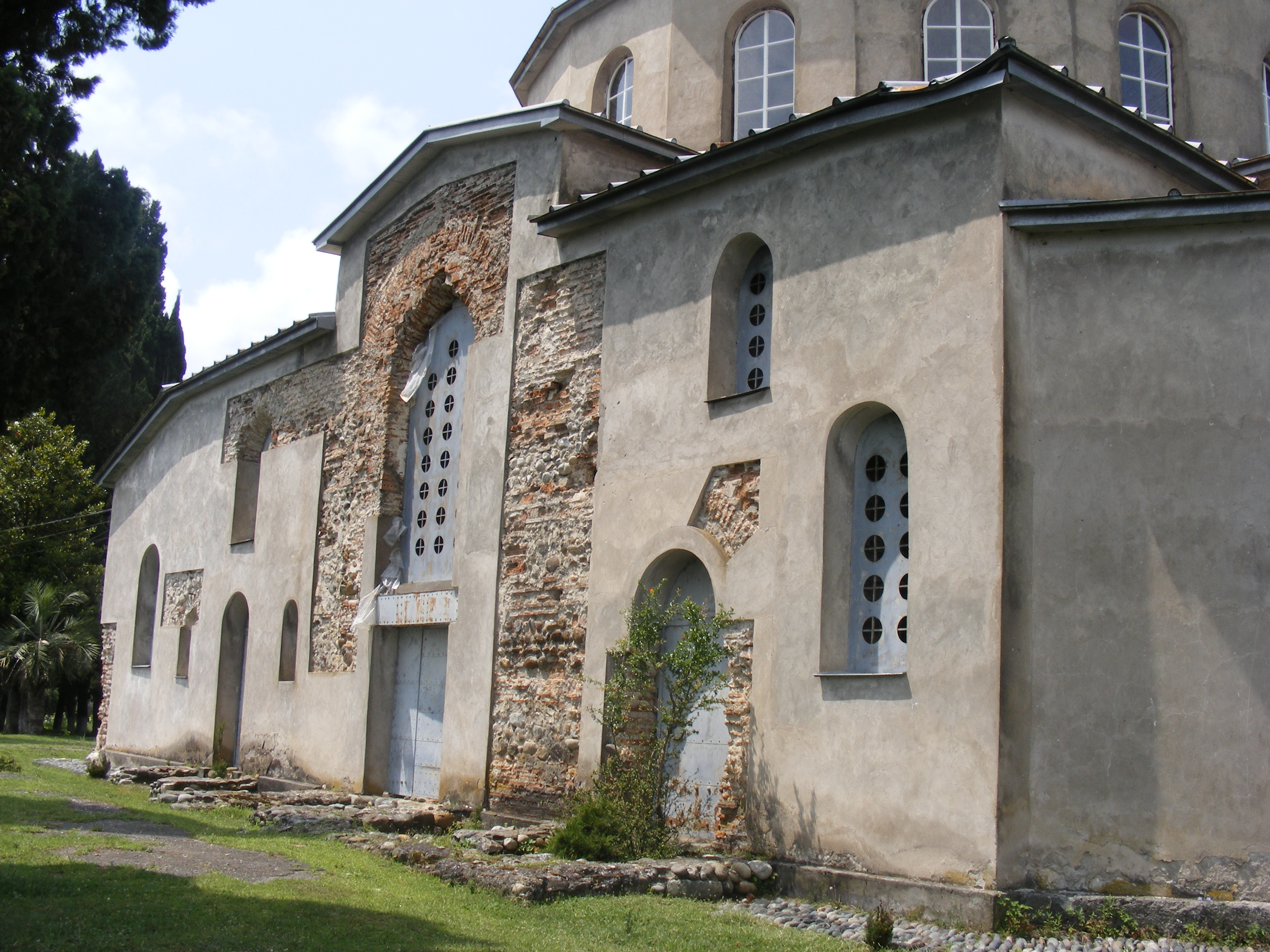
Close-up of the exterior wall.

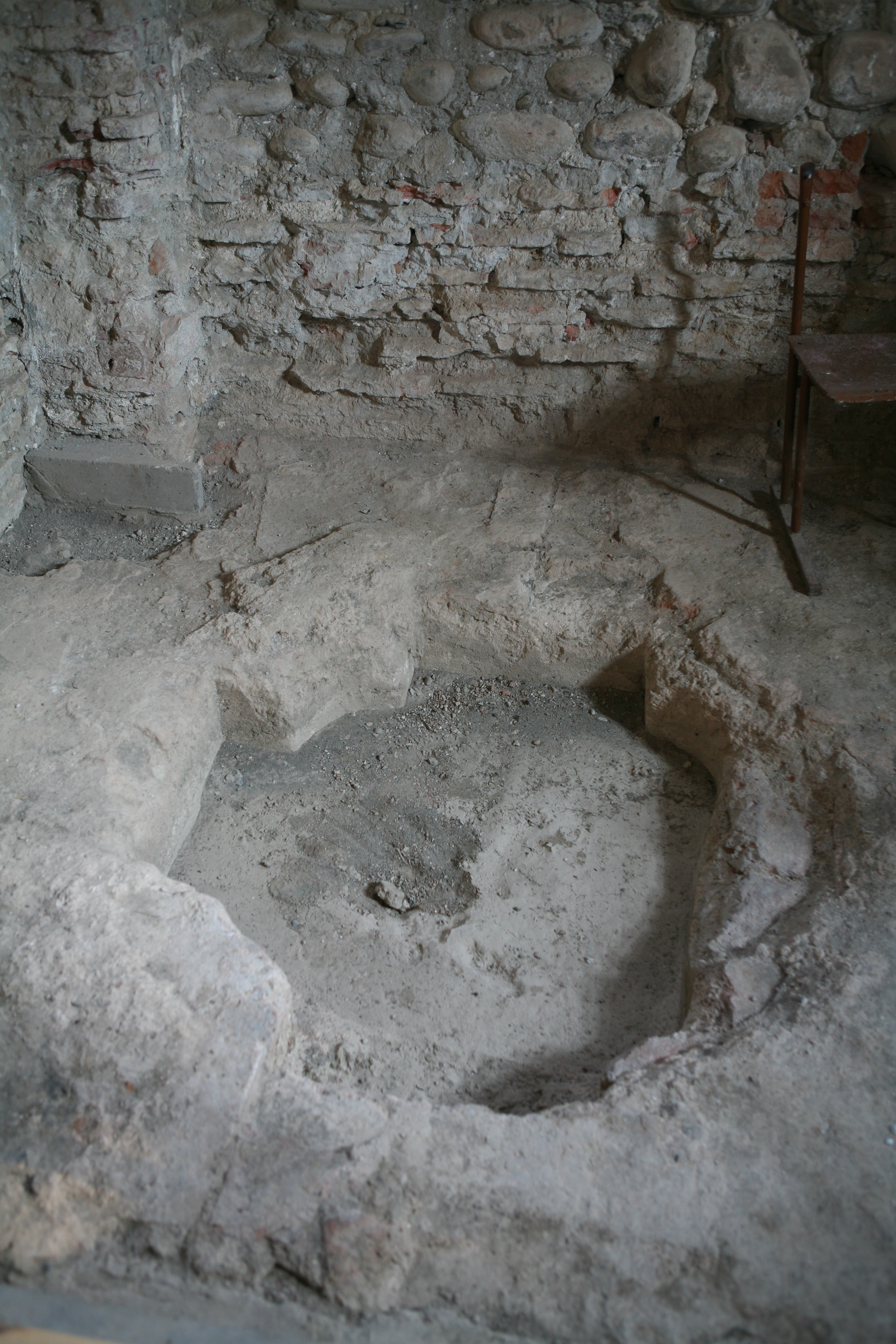
Baptismal font before the reconstruction

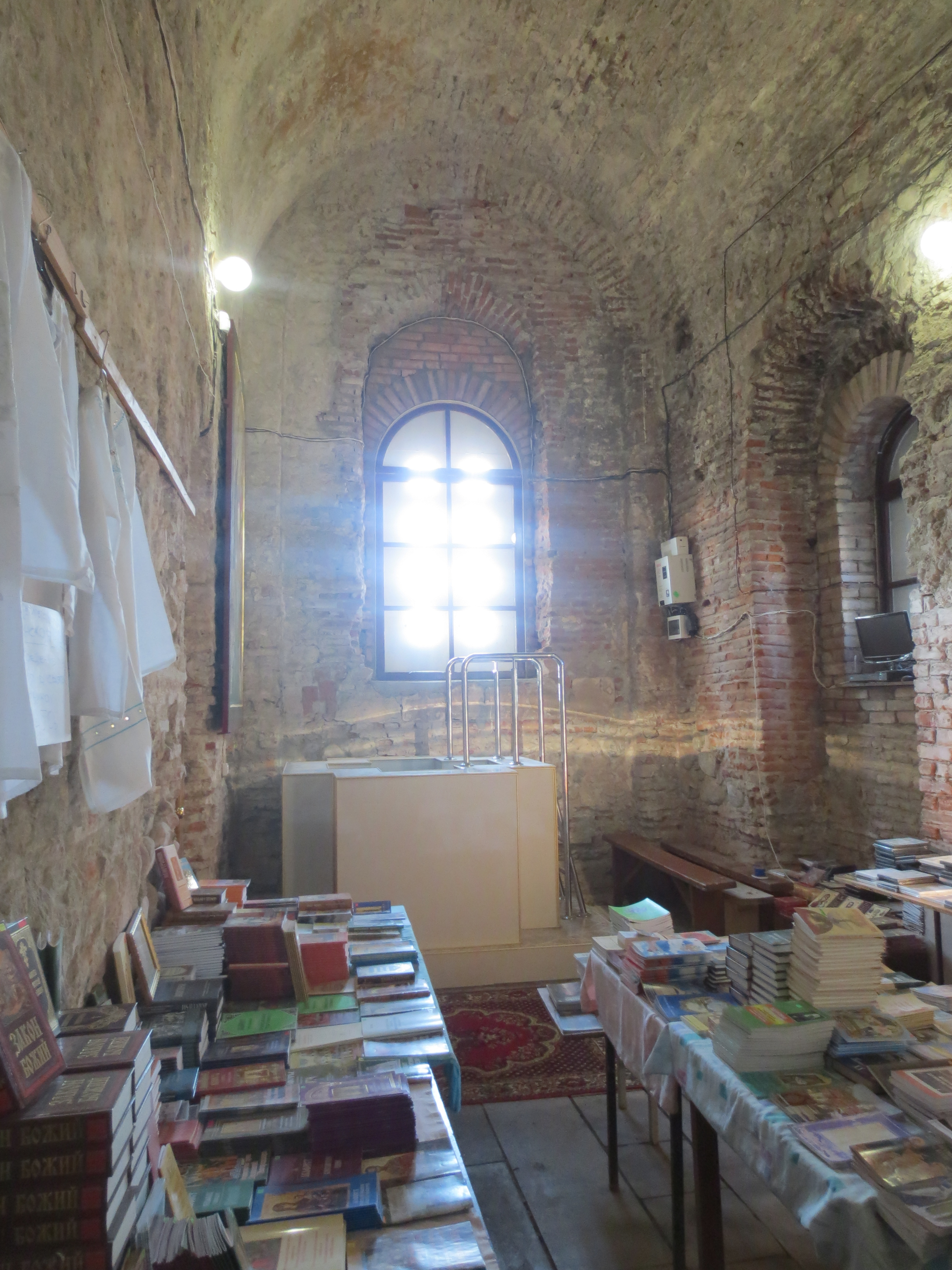
Interior with the font (after reconstruction) in the background

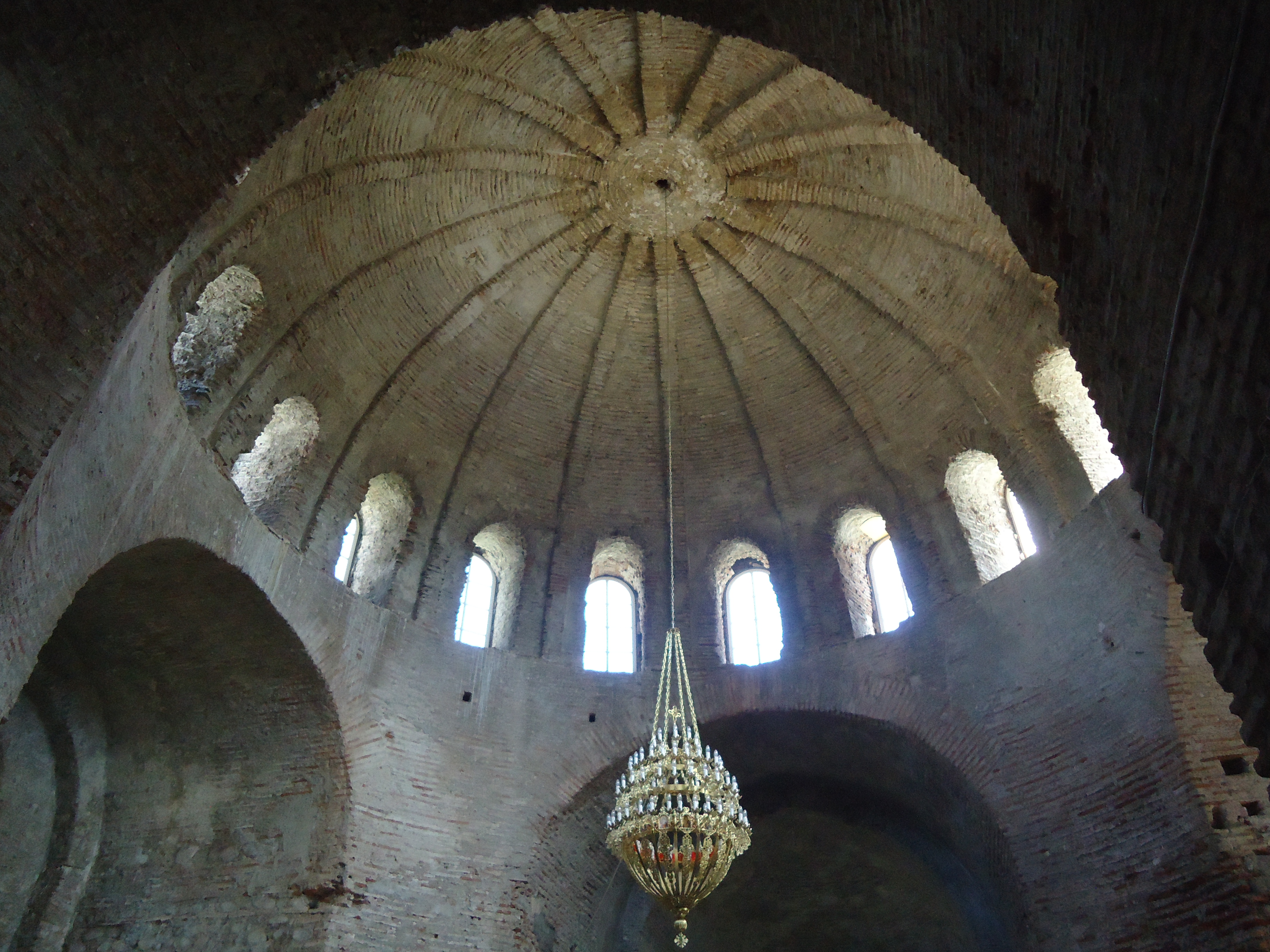
Interior of the dome

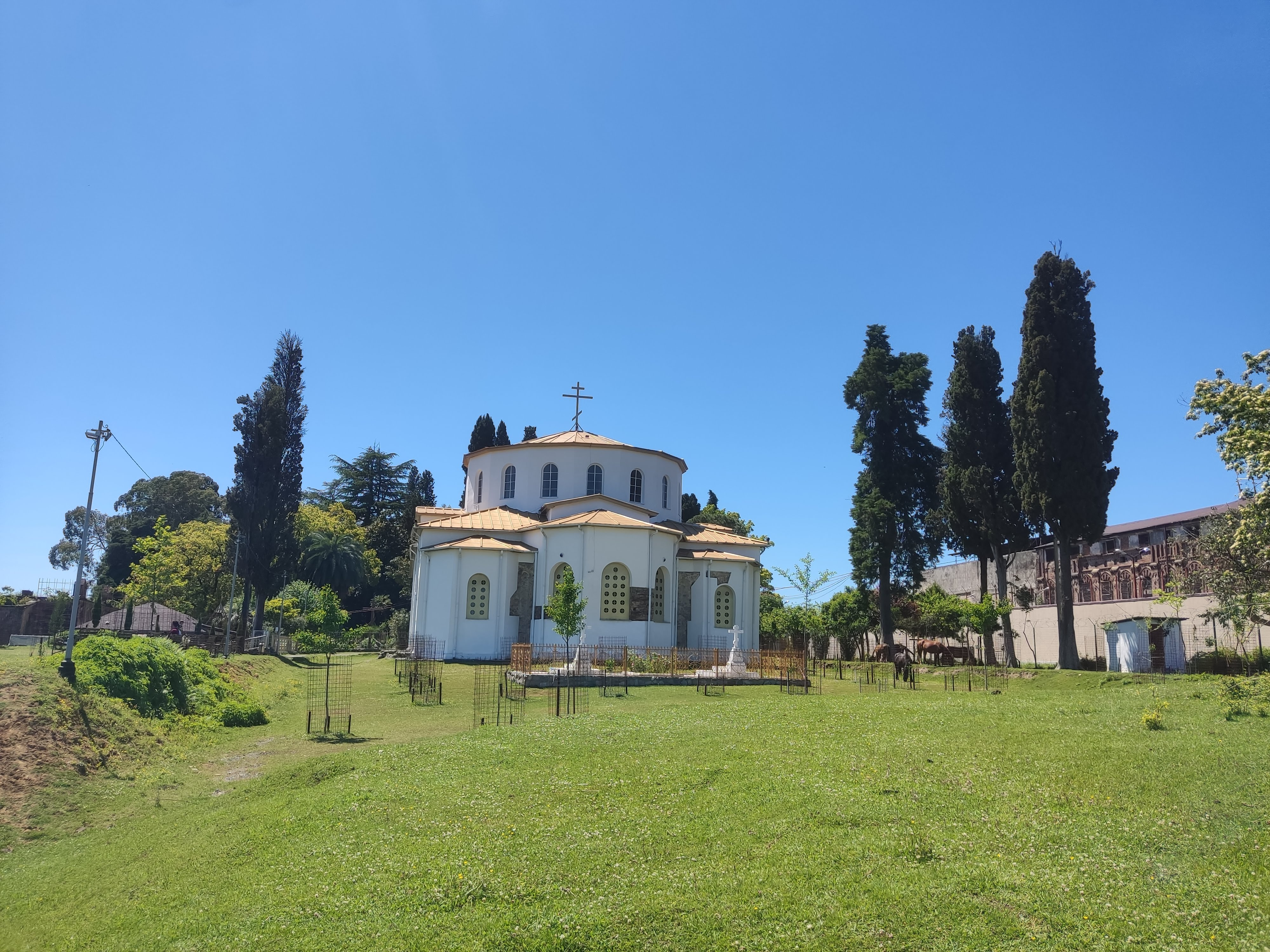
Cathedral after reconstruction

== Works cited ==
- Rapp, Stephen H. Jr (2007). "Georgian Christianity". The Blackwell Companion to Eastern Christianity. John Wiley & Sons. pp. 137–155. ISBN 978-1-4443-3361-9.
- Grdzelidze, Tamara (2011). "Georgia, Patriarchal Orthodox Church of". In John Anthony McGuckin (ed.). The Encyclopedia of Eastern Orthodox Christianity. John Wiley & Sons. pp. 264–275. ISBN 978-1-4051-8539-4.
- Mgaloblishvili, Tamila (1998). Ancient Christianity In The Caucasus. Psychology Press. ISBN 978-0-7007-0633-4.
- Toumanoff, Cyril (1963). "Iberia between Chosroid and Bagratid Rule". Studies in Christian Caucasian History. Georgetown UP.
