= September Offensive (War in Abkhazia) =

1993 offensive during the Abkhazia war

- Part of the War in Abkhazia
Date	16–30 September 1993
Location	Sukhumi, Ochamchire, and Gali rayons
Result	Abkhazian victory

Belligerents
Abkhazia; CMPC; Russia	Georgia

Commanders and leaders
Sultan Sosnaliyev; Sergei Dbar; Shamil Basayev; Sergei Matosyan (WIA)	Eduard Shevardnadze; Zhiuli Shartava †; Giorgi Karkarashvili; Geno Adamia †

The September Offensive was an offensive by the Abkhaz separatists, along with their Russian and North Caucasian backers, against the Georgian forces, during the final stage of the War in Abkhazia in September 1993.

The offensive began on 16 September, when the separatists, aided by the local Russian military base, launched their assault on Sukhumi, the capital city of the region, amidst the escalation of the Georgian Civil War. Georgians were caught by surprise, outgunned and outnumbered, which allowed the separatists to almost encircle and besiege the city and to cut its vital communication lines with the rest of Georgia. Although the warring sides in the Georgian Civil War made a deal to unify their forces to break the siege, they were still unable to coordinate effectively and on time, and thus on 27 September, the city fell to the separatists.

The disorganized Georgian forces were unable to mount a proper defence and chaotically retreated, which resulted in the separatists capturing most of the region by 30 September, thus ending the 13-month long war. On 29 September night, Georgian troops abandoned Sukhumi airport. On 30 September, Abkhazians pushed into Ochamchire. Georgian troops fled to Gali. However, It was also captured by separatists.

Following the offensive, the Abkhazian troops organized the Ethnic cleansing of Georgians in Abkhazia.

== Sources ==
- Papaskiri, Zurab (2007). ნარკვევები თანამედროვე აფხაზეთის ისტორიული წარსულიდან [Findings from the Historical Past of Modern Abkhazia] (in Georgian). Vol. 2. Tbilisi: Sukhumi Branch of Tbilisi State University.
