= Merkheuli =

Merkheuli მერხეული, Мархьаул
- Village
- Location within Georgia Location within Abkhazia Location within Gulripshi District
- Coordinates: 42.991825°N 41.164296°E
- Country: Georgia
- Partially recognized independent country: Abkhazia
- District: Gulripshi

Population (2011)
  - Total: 839
- Time zone: UTC+3 (MSK)
  - Summer (DST): UTC+4

Merkheuli (Georgian: მერხეული [meɾχeuli]; Abkhaz: Мархьаул; Armenian: Մերխեուլ) is a village in Abkhazia, Georgia. (Note: The political status of Abkhazia is disputed. Having unilaterally declared independence from Georgia in 1992, Abkhazia is formally recognised as an independent state by 4 UN member states (three other states previously recognised it but then withdrew their recognition), while the remainder of the international community recognizes it as de jure Georgian territory. Georgia continues to claim the area as its own territory, designating it as Russian-occupied territory.) A 2011 census recorded a population of 839 people.

== History ==
Fragments of Greek pottery dating back to the 6th century BC have been found in the village.

Merkheuli was established in 1879.

Following the Armenian genocide, many Armenians resettled in Merkheuli, eventually becoming the majority ethnicity in the town.

== Notable people ==
Lavrentiy Beria, chief of the NKVD from 1938 to 1945, was born in Merkheuli in 1899.

== Population ==
Year of census	Population	Ethnic composition
1886	466	Russians (61.4%), Georgians (32.2%), Abkhazians (4.3%)
1926	3,827	Georgians (47.3%), Armenians (15.8%), Russians and Ukrainians (9.2%), Abkhazians (4.3%)
1959	3,076	Georgians, Armenians, Russians, Abkhazians (no specified percentages)
1989	3,939	Georgians, Armenians, Abkhazians (no specified percentages)
2011	839	Armenians (76.3%), Georgians (9.4%), Abkhazians (8.6%), Russians (4.4%)

== Climate ==
Merkheuli has a humid subtropical climate (Cfa.)

Climate data for Merkheuli
Month	Jan	Feb	Mar	Apr	May	Jun	Jul	Aug	Sep	Oct	Nov	Dec	Year
Daily mean °C (°F)	5.1 (41.2)	5.9 (42.6)	8.8 (47.8)	12.4 (54.3)	16.9 (62.4)	20.5 (68.9)	23.3 (73.9)	23.6 (74.5)	20.3 (68.5)	16.2 (61.2)	11.5 (52.7)	7.6 (45.7)	14.3 (57.8)
Average precipitation mm (inches)	119 (4.7)	104 (4.1)	114 (4.5)	122 (4.8)	97 (3.8)	123 (4.8)	117 (4.6)	131 (5.2)	132 (5.2)	131 (5.2)	134 (5.3)	143 (5.6)	1,467 (57.8)
Source: Climate-Data.org

== See also ==
- Gulripshi District
- Merkheuli Palace
