= Lata Palace =

Medieval palace in Lata, Abkhazia, Georgia

- ლათის სასახლე (Georgian)
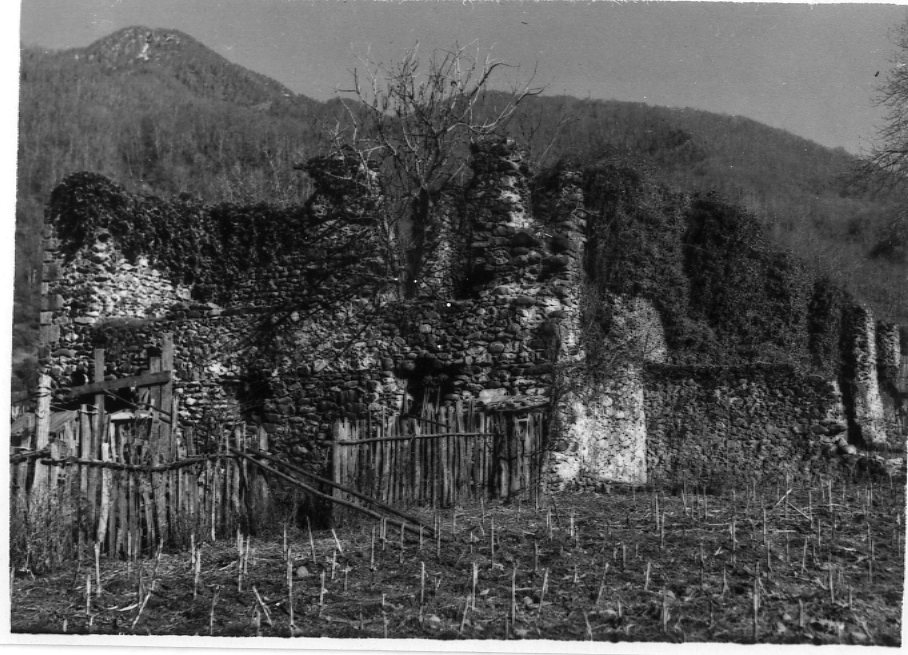

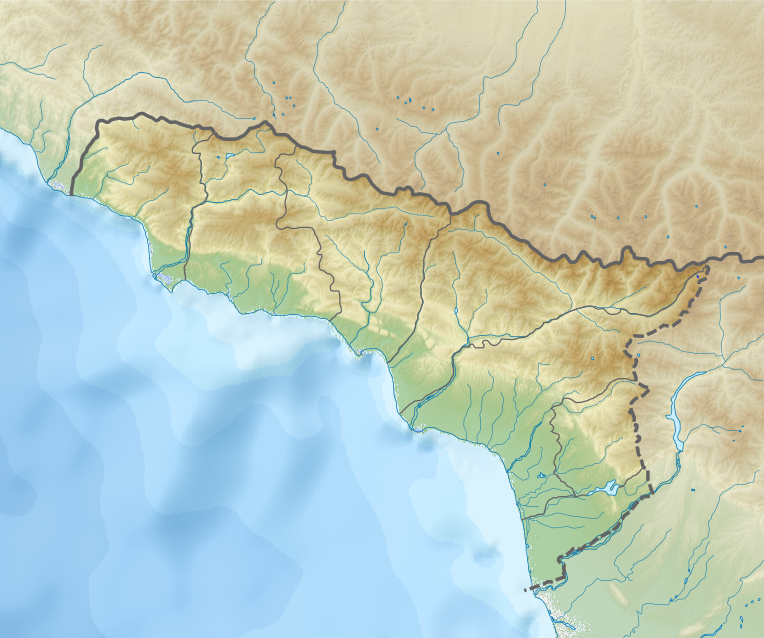
- Location within Abkhazia Location within Georgia
- 43°01′58″N 41°28′53″E
- Location: Lata, Abkhazia

Site notes
- Area: Gulripshi Municipality

Lata Palace (Georgian: ლათის სასახლე) is a palace in the village of Lata, in the Gulripshi municipality of Abkhazia.

== History ==
The palace was built in the middle ages. The construction was built with the stone and brick blocks. The entrance doors are located in the eastern and northern walls. The palace consists of seven sections that are connected to each other with the doors. All sections have large windows. The seventh section is currently most well preserved. It is built with stone blocks and has a stone roofing too. Apparently, this section was a water reservoir. The palace had a stone floor, which is currently more or less preserved. The roofing is already crumbled. The walls are 6 meters high and 1 meter thick.
