= Lata Castle =

- ლათის ციხესიმაგრე (Georgian)
- Location within Abkhazia Location within Georgia
- 43°02′25″N 41°28′10″E
- Location: (Georgia (country)) Gulripshi Municipality, Autonomous Republic of Abkhazia, Georgia

Site notes
- Area: Gulripshi Municipality

The Lata Castle (Georgian: ლათის ციხესიმაგრე) is a ruined medieval castle in the village of Lata in the Gulripshi municipality, Abkhazia, a breakaway region of Georgia.

== History ==
The castle sits on a cliff overlooking a waterfall in the depth of a small river valley. Its walls stand in ruins, built of coarsely processed limestone slabs. There no towers or other accessory structures. Based on the type of fragments of pottery found at the site, the castle is roughly dated to the period from the 11th to the 14th centuries.
