= Gulripshi =

Settlement in Abkhazia, Georgia

Gulripshi გულრიფში, Гәылрыԥшь
- Urban Type Settlement
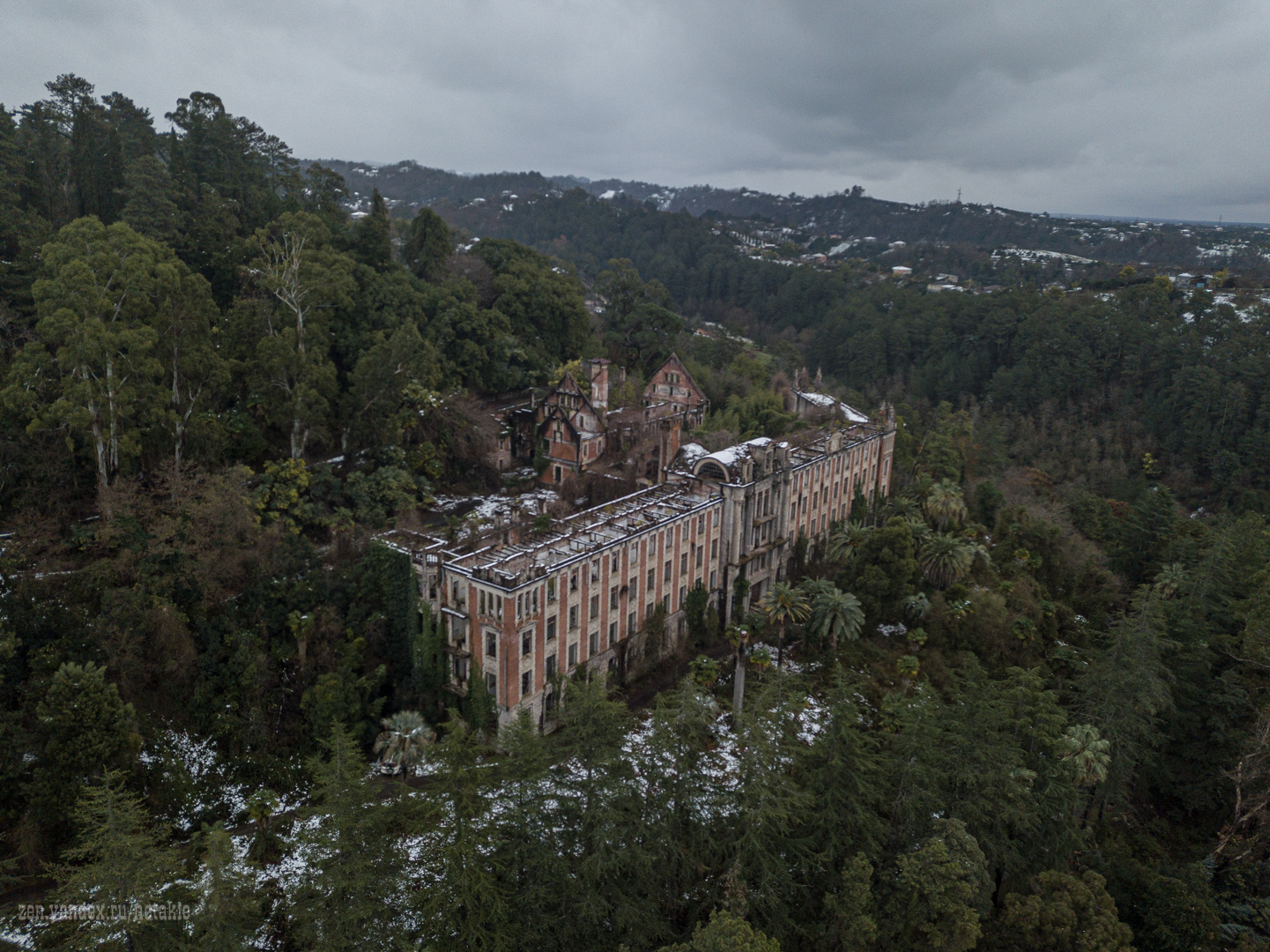
- The abandoned Lower Building of Gulripshi's Smetskoy Sanatorium, built by Nikolay Smetskoy.

- Location within Georgia Location within Abkhazia Location within Gulripshi District
- Coordinates: 42.931418°N 41.106128°E
- Country (de jure): Georgia
- Country (de facto): Abkhazia (Note: The political status of Abkhazia is disputed. Having unilaterally declared independence from Georgia in 1992, Abkhazia is formally recognised as an independent state by 4 UN member states (three other states previously recognised it but then withdrew their recognition), while the remainder of the international community recognizes it as de jure Georgian territory. Georgia continues to claim the area as its own territory, designating it as Russian-occupied territory.)
- District: Gulripshi
- Elevation: 20 m (66 ft)

Population (2011)
  - Total: 3,910
- Time zone: UTC+3 (MSK)
  - Summer (DST): UTC+4

Gulripshi (Georgian: გულრიფში, [ˈɡuɫɾipʰʃi]; Abkhaz: Гәылрыԥшь, Gwylryphsh; Russian: Гульрыпш, Gulrypsh) is an urban settlement in Abkhazia, a breakaway region of Georgia. It is located 12 km from Sokhumi, and is the capital of Gulripshi District.

== History ==
Nikolay Smetskoy built three sanatoria in Gulripshi between 1902 and 1913 for patients with pulmonary diseases and founded several parks with subtropical plants. After the Russian Revolution, the sanatoria were nationalised.

In 1991, Gulripshi contained several educational and research facilities, including kindergartens, secondary general education schools, and a music school. It also hosted the Sokhumi Experimental Station of Subtropical Cultures and the Abkhazian Plant Protection Experimental Station.

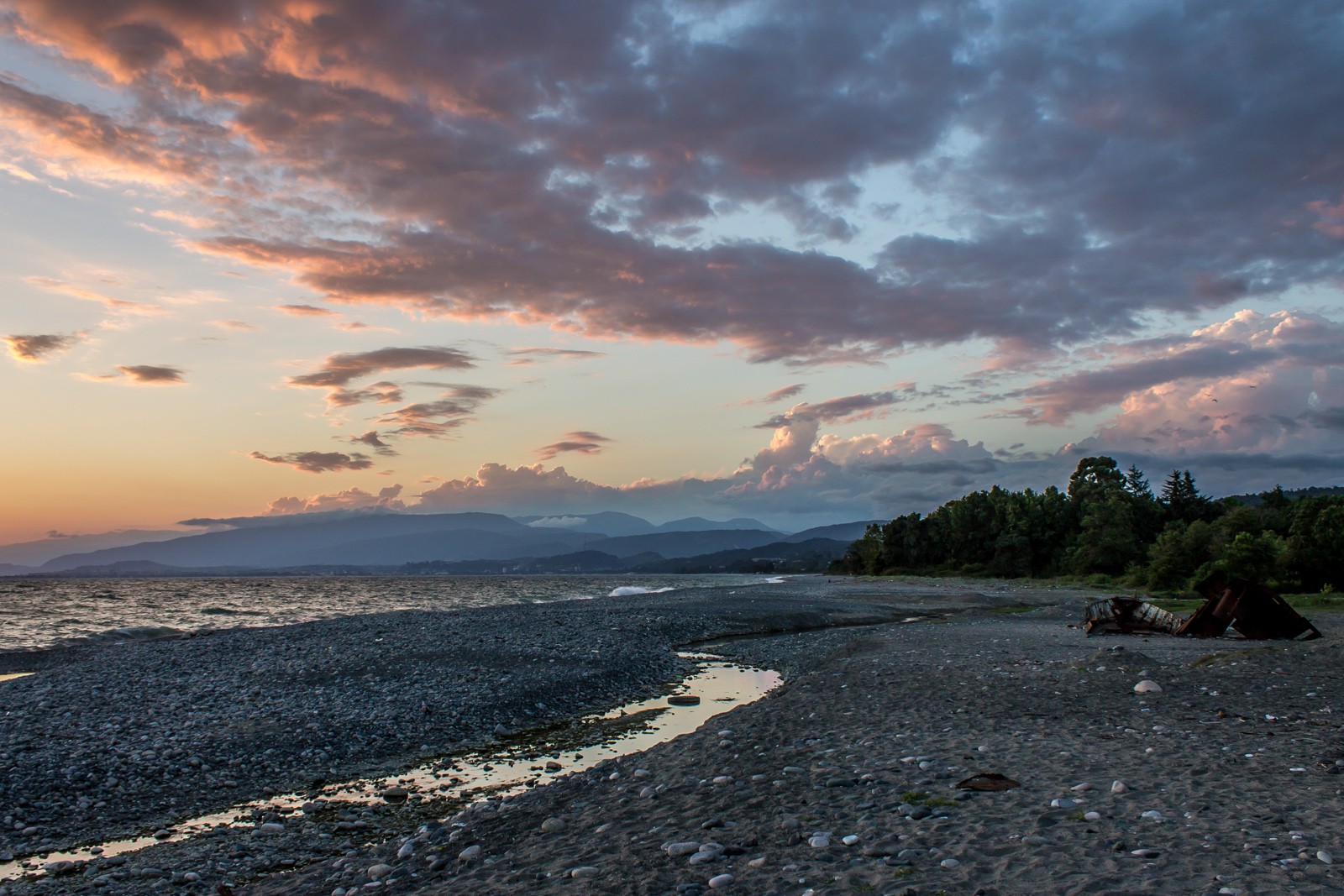
Beach in Gulripshi.

== Climate ==
Gulripshi has a humid subtropical climate (Köppen: Cfa), characterized by warm winters and hot summers. The town averages 2,100 hours of sunlight annually. Sea breezes typically soften the summer heat, though temperature extremes of 41°C and −12°C have been recorded.

Climate data for Gulripshi
Month	Jan	Feb	Mar	Apr	May	Jun	Jul	Aug	Sep	Oct	Nov	Dec	Year
Daily mean °C (°F)	5.7 (42.3)	6.3 (43.3)	9.3 (48.7)	12.6 (54.7)	17.1 (62.8)	20.7 (69.3)	23.4 (74.1)	23.9 (75.0)	20.6 (69.1)	16.7 (62.1)	11.9 (53.4)	8.2 (46.8)	14.7 (58.5)
Average precipitation mm (inches)	126 (5.0)	107 (4.2)	118 (4.6)	124 (4.9)	97 (3.8)	122 (4.8)	117 (4.6)	132 (5.2)	136 (5.4)	137 (5.4)	140 (5.5)	151 (5.9)	1,507 (59.3)
Source: Climate-Data.org

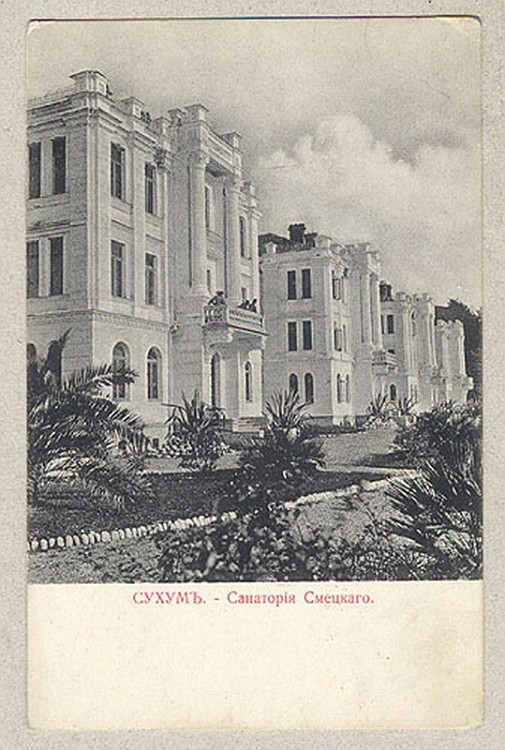
Smetskoy's sanatorium (postcard)

== See also ==
- Gulripshi District
