= Gulripshi District =

Gulripshi District გულრიფშის რაიონი Гәылрыҧшь араион
- District
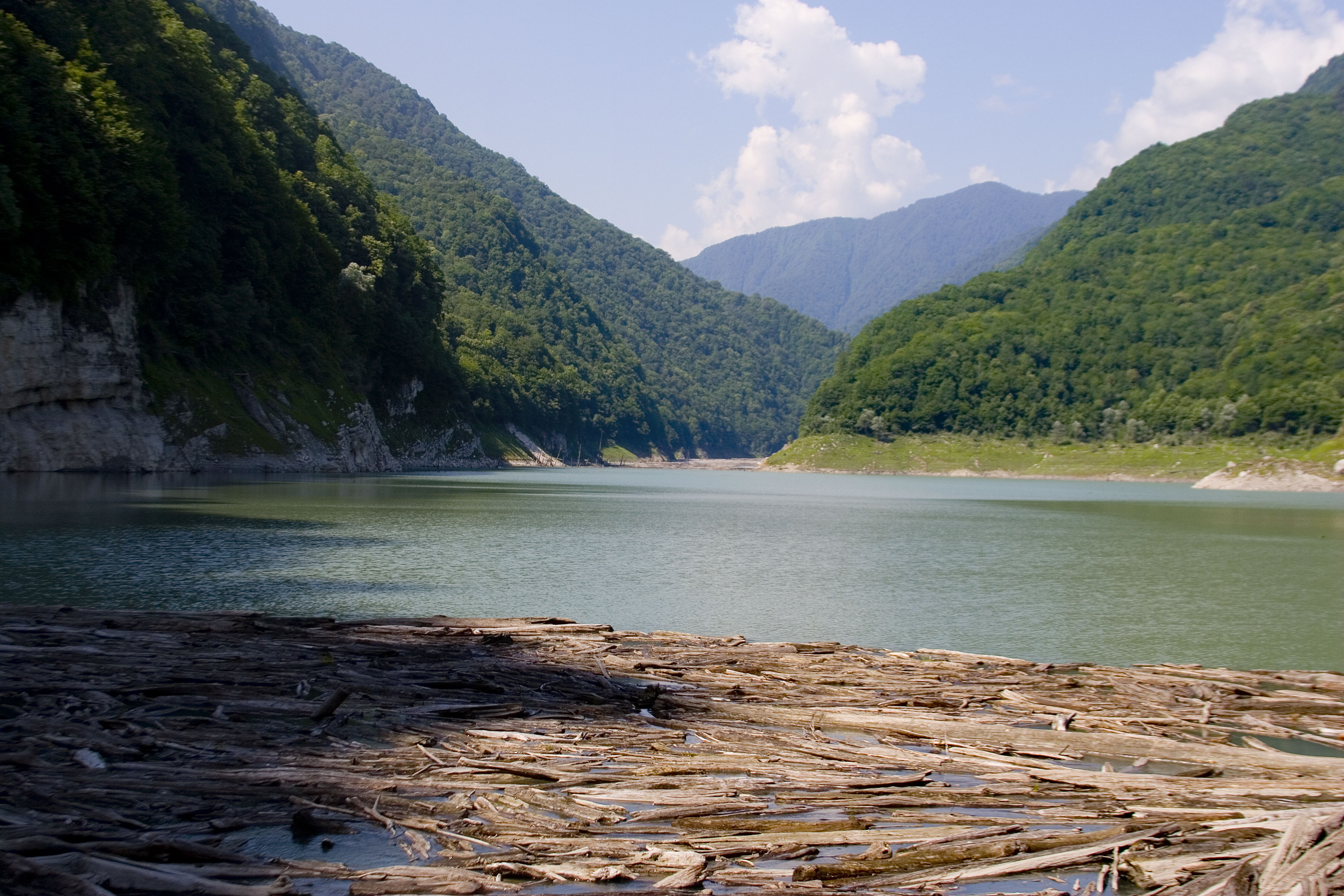
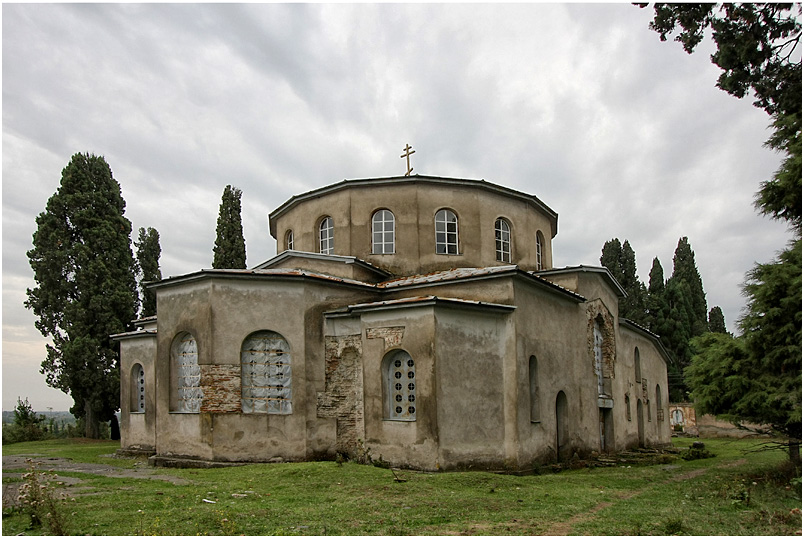
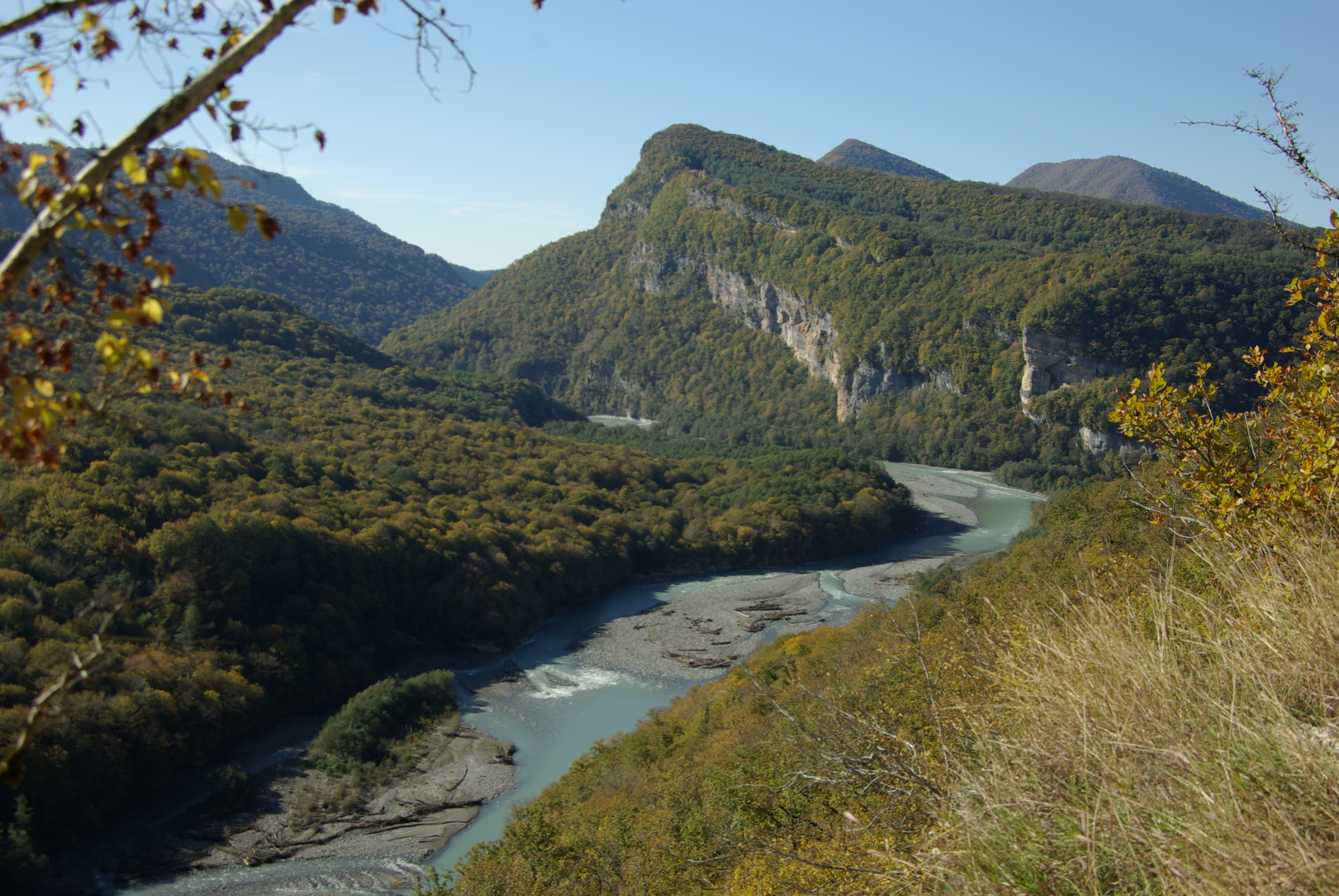
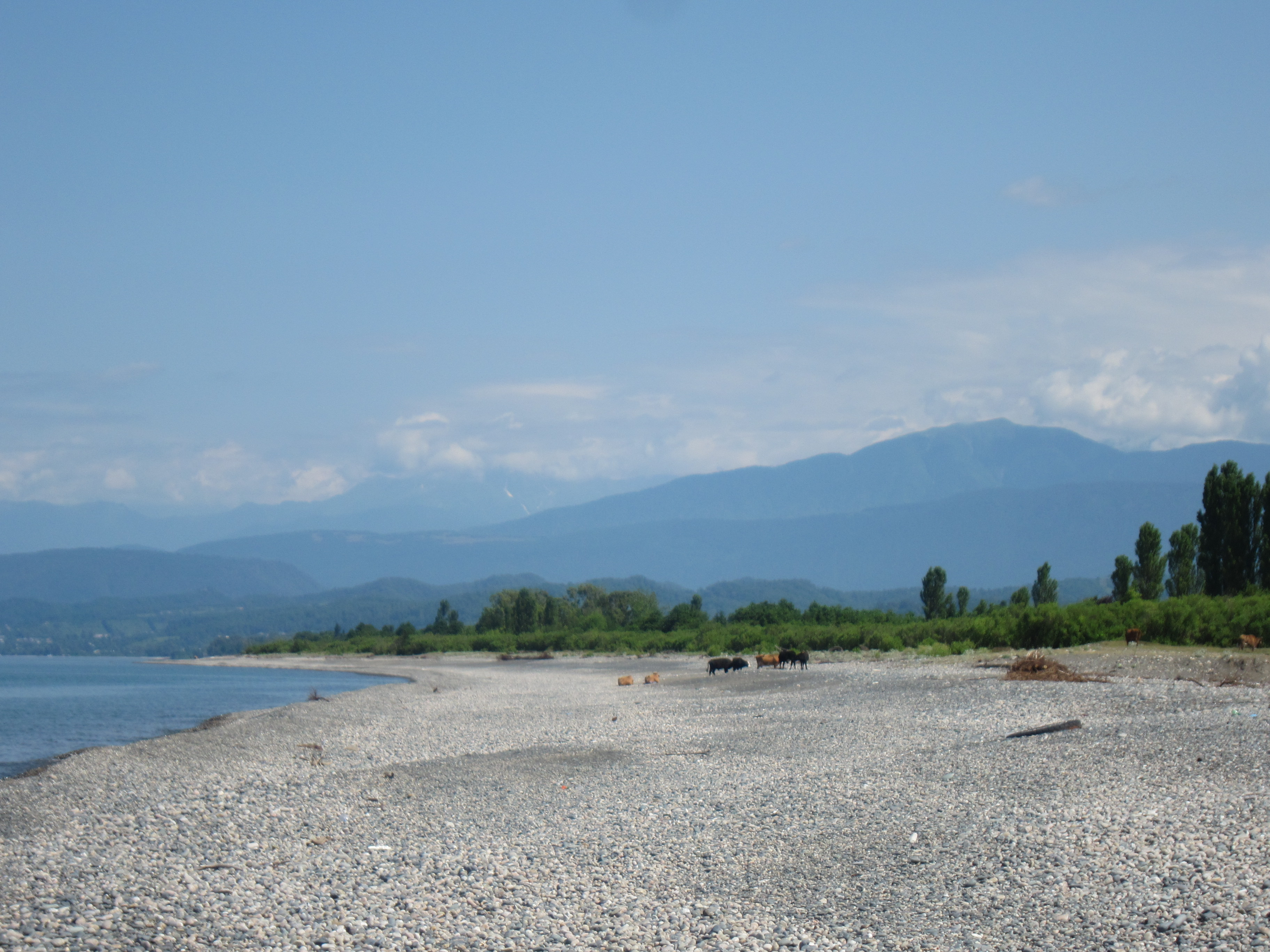
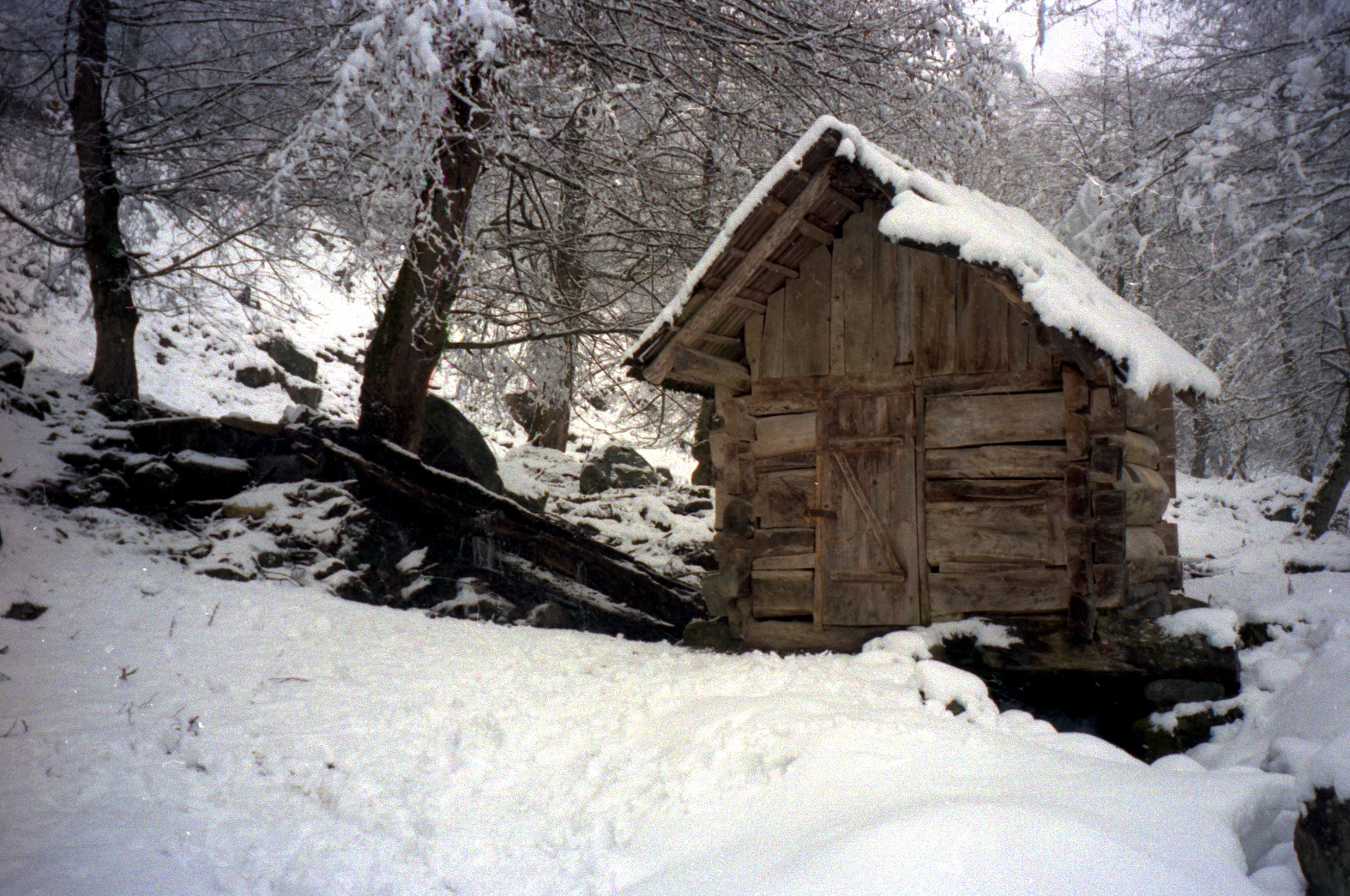
- From the top to bottom-right, Lake Amtkeli, Dranda Cathedral, Kodori River, Babushara Beach, Upper Abkhazia

- Coat of arms
- Location of Gulripshi district in Abkhazia
- Coordinates: 43.1000°N 41.4170°E
- Country: Georgia
- De Facto state: Abkhazia
- Capital: Gulripshi

Government
  - Governor: Aslan Baratelia

Area
  - Total: 1,835 km^{2} (708 sq mi)

Population (2011)
  - Total: 18,032
  - Density: 9.827/km^{2} (25.45/sq mi)
- Time zone: UTC+3 (MSK)

Gulripshi District (Georgian: გულრიფშის რაიონი, Abkhaz: Гәылрыҧшь араион) is a district of Abkhazia, one of Georgia's breakaway republics. It corresponds to the eponymous Georgian district. Its capital is Gulripshi, the town by the same name. Until the August 2008 Battle of the Kodori Valley, the north-eastern part of Gulripshi district was part of Upper Abkhazia, the corner of Abkhazia controlled by Georgia until the Battle of the Kodori Valley during the August 2008 South Ossetia War. Upper Abkhazia was home to 1,956 of the district's 19,918 inhabitants, most of whom were ethnic Svans (a subgroup of the Georgian people). Most of these fled before the battle and have not yet returned.

Of note is the Dranda Cathedral sitting over a shrine built by Justinian in 551. The medieval principality of Dal-Tsabal was centered in the district. Abkhazia's main airport, Sukhumi Dranda Airport, is also located in Gulripshi district.

== Administration ==
Adgur Kharazia was reappointed as Administration Head on 10 May 2001 following the March 2001 local elections.

On 18 December 2002, President Ardzinba released Kharazia as Administration Head and appointed him as Minister for Agriculture and Food.

On 16 June 2003, President Ardzinba appointed Tamaz Gogia as Administration Head. In the beginning of 2004, district officials stayed away from work in protest of what they perceived as rudeness from Gogia. In response, Gogia applied for resignation which President Ardzinba granted on 9 February, appointing First Deputy Head Aslan Baratelia as acting Head.

On 24 March 2005, newly elected President Sergei Bagapsh replaced Administration Head Aslan Baratelia with Mikhail Logua. In the 2011 Presidential election, Logua successfully ran for Vice President alongside Alexander Ankvab. He was succeeded on 14 December by Timur Eshba, who had previously been Deputy Head.

Following the May 2014 Revolution and the election of Raul Khajimba as President, on 23 September 2014 he replaced Eshba with Aslan Baratelia.

=== List of Administration Heads ===
#	Name	From	Until	President	Comments
	Adgur Kharazia	1993	26 November 1994		
	Adgur Kharazia	26 November 1994	18 December 2002	Vladislav Ardzinba	
	Tamaz Gogia	16 June 2003	9 February 2004	Vladislav Ardzinba	
	Aslan Baratelia	9 February 2004	24 March 2005	Vladislav Ardzinba	First time
	Mikhail Logua	24 March 2005	29 May 2011	Sergei Bagapsh	
	Mikhail Logua	29 May 2011	26 September 2011	Alexander Ankvab	
	Timur Eshba	14 December 2011	1 June 2014	Alexander Ankvab	
	Timur Eshba	1 June 2014	23 October 2014	Valeri Bganba	
	Aslan Baratelia	23 October 2014	Present	Raul Khajimba	Second time

== Demographics ==
At the time of the 2011 census, the population of the district was 18 032 people, consisting of:

- Armenians (46.8%)
- Abkhazians (33.6%)
- Russians (11.4%)
- Georgians (4.6%)
- Ukrainians (0.9%)
- Greeks (0.7%)

== Settlements ==
The district's main settlements are:

- Gulripshi
- Tsebelda
- Dranda
- Babushera
- Chkhalta (the main village of what used to be Upper Abkhazia)
- Machara

== See also ==
- Kodori Valley
