= Index of Abkhazia-related articles =

This is an alphabetical list of Abkhazia-related articles.

== 0-9 ==
2012 in Abkhazia; 4th convocation of the People's Assembly of Abkhazia

== A ==
Abazgi languages; Abkhazia; Abkhaz–Georgian conflict; Abkhazia national football team; Abkhazians; Abkhazians of African descent; Abkhazian parliamentary election, 2007; Abkhazian Revolution; Abkhazia–Russia border; Abkhaz language; Abkhaz neopaganism; Adarnase of Abkhazia; Aitaira; Alexander Stranichkin; Armenians in Abkhazia; Apsny (political party);

== B ==
Bibliography of Abkhazia;

== C ==
Catholicate of Abkhazia; Chamber of Commerce and Industry of the Republic of Abkhazia; Constantine III of Abkhazia; Constitution of Abkhazia; Communist Party of Abkhazia; Community for Democracy and Rights of Nations; Constitutional Court of Abkhazia; Council of Priests of Abkhazia; Culture of Abkhazia

== D ==
Demographics of Abkhazia; Districts of Abkhazia; Dmitry, Prince of Abkhazia; Dolmens of Abkhazia;

== E ==
Economy of Abkhazia; Elections in Abkhazia; Emblem of Abkhazia; Emblem of the Socialist Soviet Republic of Abkhazia; Ethnic cleansing of Georgians in Abkhazia;

== F ==
People's Front of Abkhazia for Development and Justice; Flag of Abkhazia; Football Federation of Abkhazia; Foreign relations of Abkhazia; Forum for the National Unity of Abkhazia; Foundations of Geopolitics;

== G ==
Gali District, Abkhazia; German involvement in Georgian–Abkhaz conflict; Georgian sea blockade of Abkhazia; Government of President Ankvab; Government of President Bagapsh; Government of the Autonomous Republic of Abkhazia; Gurandukht of Abkhazia;

== H ==
History of the Jews in Abkhazia;

== I ==
International recognition of Abkhazia and South Ossetia;

== J ==
John of Abkhazia;

== K ==
Kamani massacre; Kelesh Ahmed-Bey Shervashidze; Kingdom of Abkhazia; Konstantin Ozgan;

== L ==
Law enforcement in Abkhazia; Leon III of Abkhazia; List of airports in Abkhazia; List of cities and towns in Georgia (country); List of companies of Abkhazia; List of diplomatic missions in Abkhazia; List of diplomatic missions of Abkhazia; List of political parties in Abkhazia; List of speakers of the People's Assembly of Abkhazia;

== M ==
Media in Abkhazia; Mikhail, Prince of Abkhazia; Military of Abkhazia; Minister for Culture and the Preservation of Historical and Cultural Heritage of Abkhazia; Minister for Defence of Abkhazia;

== N ==
Natella Akaba;

== O ==
Occupied territories of Georgia; Outline of Abkhazia;

== P ==
Politics of Abkhazia; President of Abkhazia; Principality of Abkhazia; Public Chamber of Abkhazia

== R ==
Raul Khajimba;

== S ==
Sergei Matosyan; Sergei Shamba; Seven Shrines of Abkhazia; Social-Democratic Party of Abkhazia; Socialist Soviet Republic of Abkhazia; Sport in Abkhazia; State Security Service of Abkhazia; Subdivisions of Abkhazia;

== T ==
Telephone numbers in Abkhazia; Theodosius II of Abkhazia; Timeline of the War in Abkhazia (1992–93); Tourism in Abkhazia; Turks in Abkhazia;

== U ==
Upper Abkhazia;

== V ==
Valter Sanaya; Vehicle registration plates of Abkhazia; Viacheslav Chirikba; Vice President of Abkhazia; Visa requirements for Abkhaz citizens;

== W ==
Women in Abkhazia;

== See also ==
Lists of country-related topics
