= Outline of Abkhazia =

De facto independent state in Eurasia

The Flag of Abkhazia

The Emblem of Abkhazia

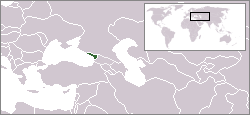
The location of Abkhazia

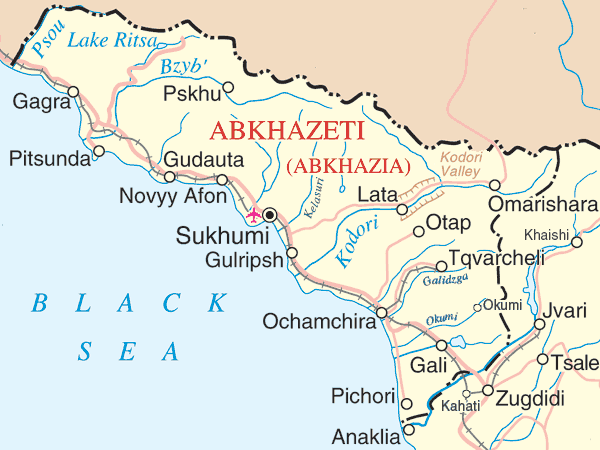
An enlargeable map of Abkhazia

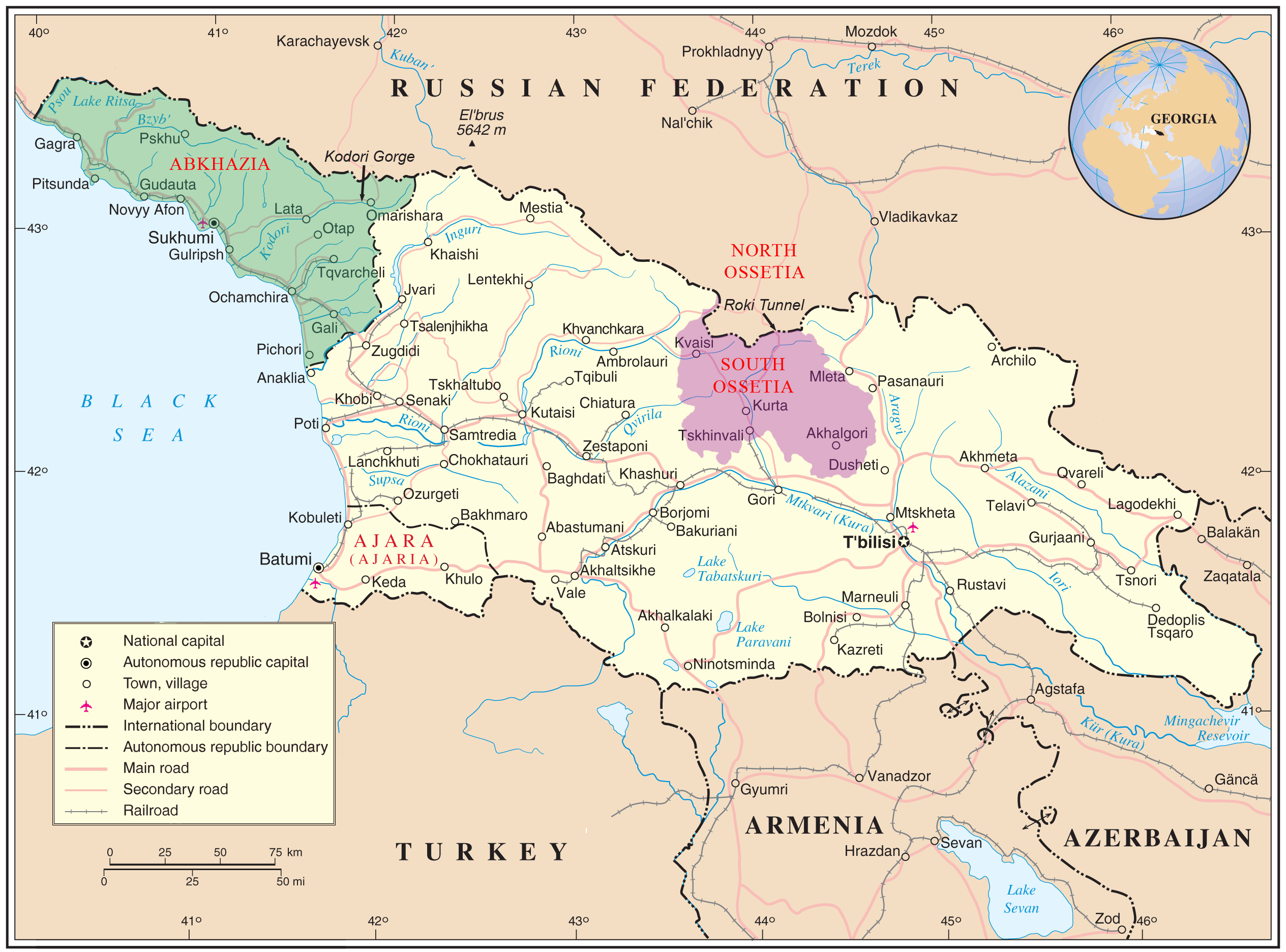
An enlargeable map of Georgia

The following outline is provided as an overview of and topical guide to Abkhazia:

Abkhazia is a de facto independent state located in Eurasia whose de jure sovereignty is only recognized by Russia, Nicaragua, Venezuela, Syria and the disputed states of South Ossetia and Transnistria. The rest of the world's states consider Abkhazia to be de jure part of Georgia.

Abkhazia is located in the western Caucasus, on the eastern coast of the Black Sea. On the north, it borders the Russian Federation, on the east Georgia's Samegrelo-Zemo Svaneti region.

== General reference ==
- Pronunciation
- Common English country name: Abkhazia
- Official English country name: disputed between the Republic of Abkhazia and the Autonomous Republic of Abkhazia
- Official English country name used by UN and international community: Autonomous Republic of Abkhazia
- Common endonym(s):
- Official endonym(s):
- Adjectival(s): Abkhaz, Abkhazian
- Demonym(s):
- Etymology: Name of Abkhazia
- ISO country codes: See the Outline of Georgia (country)
- ISO region codes: See the Outline of Georgia (country)
- Internet country code top-level domain: See the Outline of Georgia

== Geography of Abkhazia ==
An enlargeable topographic map of Abkhazia

Geography of Abkhazia

- Abkhazia is: a de facto independent state, its de jure independence is only recognised by Russia, Nicaragua and South Ossetia, the rest of the world's states recognise it as part of Georgia.
- Location:
  - Northern Hemisphere and Eastern Hemisphere
    - Eurasia
      - Asia
        - Southwest Asia
          - Caucasus
            - Georgia
      - Europe
        - Eastern Europe
          - Caucasus
            - Georgia
  - Time zone: MSK (UTC+3)
- Extreme Points:
  - Northernmost Point: The Psou River near the Russian village of Aibga in Krasnodar Krai
  - Southernmost Point: A beach near Bchara
  - Easternmost Point: Near the source of the Sakeni River in the Caucasus
  - Westernmost Point: Leselidze
  - Highest Point: Summit of Dombay-Ulgen
  - Lowest Point: Sea level
- Population of Abkhazia: 216,000 (2003 and disputed)
- Area of Abkhazia: 8,432 square kilometres (3,256 sq mi)
- Atlas of Abkhazia

=== Environment of Abkhazia ===
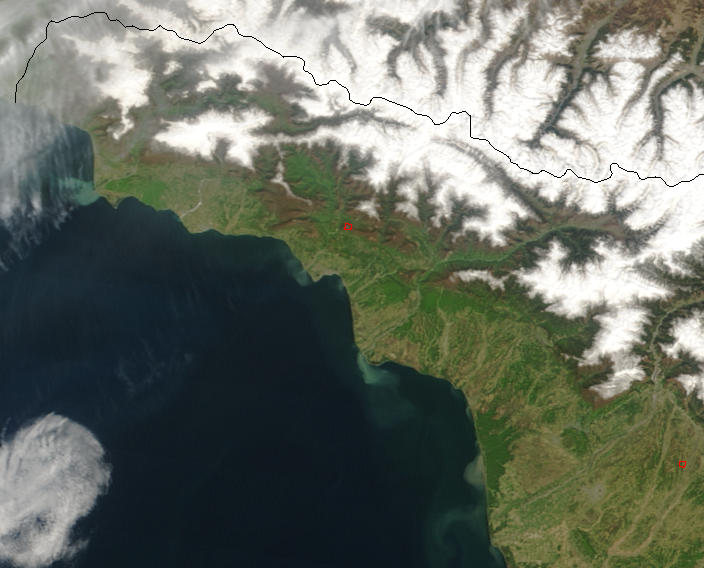
An enlargeable satellite image of Abkhazia

- Climate of Abkhazia
- World Heritage Sites in Abkhazia: None

=== Regions of Abkhazia ===
==== Administrative divisions of Abkhazia ====
Administrative divisions of Abkhazia

- Districts of Abkhazia
  - Municipalities of Abkhazia

===== Districts of Abkhazia =====
Districts of Abkhazia

- Gagra
- Gali
- Gudauta
- Gulripshi
- Ochamchire
- Sukhumi
- Tkvarcheli

===== Municipalities of Abkhazia =====
Municipalities of Abkhazia

====== Cities of Abkhazia ======
- Capital of Abkhazia: Sukhumi

====== Towns of Abkhazia ======
- Gagra
- Gali
- Gudauta
- New Athos
- Ochamchire
- Pitsunda
- Tkvarcheli

====== Other settlements (villages) ======
- Bzyb
- Gulripshi
- Leselidze
- Ilori
- Lykhny
- Miusera
- Pskhu
- Gantiadi

=== Demography of Abkhazia ===
Demographics of Abkhazia

== Government and politics of Abkhazia ==
Politics of Abkhazia Abkhazia is de facto independent, but most of the world's governments consider Abkhazia to be a de jure part of Georgia, and not an independent country.

- Form of government: presidential representative democratic republic
- Capital of Abkhazia: Sukhumi
- Elections in Abkhazia
- Political parties in Abkhazia

=== Branches of government ===
Government of the Republic of Abkhazia

==== Executive branch of the government of Abkhazia ====
- Head of state: President of Abkhazia, Raul Khajimba
- Head of government: Prime Minister of Abkhazia, Alexander Ankvab
- Cabinet of Abkhazia
  - Prime Minister – Alexander Ankvab
  - First Vice Premier – Indira Awardan
  - Vice Premier – Alexander Stranichkin
  - Vice Premier – Vladimir Delba
  - Chief of the Cabinet Staff – Marina Ladaria
  - Minister of Defence – Mirab Kishmaria
  - Minister of Finance – Vladimir Delba
  - Minister for Foreign Affairs – Viacheslav Chirikba
  - Minister of Internal Affairs – Otar Khetsia
  - Minister of Justice – Yekaterina Onishchenko
  - Minister of Economy – David Iradyan
  - Minister for Taxes and Fees – Rauf Tsimtsba
  - Minister of Agriculture – Beslan Jopua
  - Minister of Labour and Social Security – Olga Koltukova
  - Minister of Health – Zurab Marshan
  - Minister of Education – Daur Nachkebia
  - Minister of Culture – Badr Gunba
  - Chairman of the State Customs Committee – Said Tarkil
  - Chairman of the State Committee for Management of State Property and Privatization – Konstantin Katsia
  - Chairman of the State Committee for Resorts and Tourism – Tengiz Lakerbaia
  - Chairman of the State Committee on Youth and Sport – Shazina Avidzba
  - Chairman of the State Committee for Repatriation – Zurab Adleiba
  - Chairman of the State Committee for Ecology and Nature – Roman Dbar

==== Legislative branch of the government of Abkhazia ====
- People's Assembly of Abkhazia (unicameral)

==== Judicial branch of the government of Abkhazia ====
Court system of Abkhazia

- Supreme Court of Abkhazia – highest judicial body in Abkhazia
- Military Court (Abkhazia)
- Arbitrary Court (Abkhazia)
- Council of Justice (Abkhazia)

=== Foreign relations of Abkhazia ===
Foreign relations of Abkhazia

- Diplomatic missions in Abkhazia
- Diplomatic missions of Abkhazia
- Abkhazia-Russia relations
- Abkhazia-Nicaragua relations
- Abkhazia-South Ossetia relations

==== International organization membership ====
- none

=== Law and order in Abkhazia ===
Law of Abkhazia

- Constitution of Abkhazia
- Crime in Abkhazia
- Human rights in Abkhazia
  - LGBT rights in Abkhazia
  - Freedom of religion in Abkhazia
- Law enforcement in Abkhazia

=== Military of Abkhazia ===
Military of Abkhazia

- Command
  - Commander-in-chief:
    - Ministry of Defence of Abkhazia
- Forces
  - Army of Abkhazia
  - Navy of Abkhazia
  - Air Force of Abkhazia
  - Special forces of Abkhazia
- Military history of Abkhazia
- Military ranks of Abkhazia

=== Local government in Abkhazia ===
Local government in Abkhazia

== History of Abkhazia ==
History of Abkhazia

- Timeline of the history of Abkhazia
- Current events of Abkhazia
- Military history of Abkhazia

== Culture of Abkhazia ==
Culture of Abkhazia

- Architecture of Abkhazia
- Cuisine of Abkhazia
- Festivals in Abkhazia
- Languages of Abkhazia
- Media in Abkhazia
- National symbols of Abkhazia
  - Emblem of Abkhazia
  - Flag of Abkhazia
  - National anthem of Abkhazia: Aiaaira
- People of Abkhazia
  - Macropogones
- Public holidays in Abkhazia
- Records of Abkhazia
- Religion in Abkhazia
  - Christianity in Abkhazia
  - Hinduism in Abkhazia
  - Islam in Abkhazia
  - Judaism in Abkhazia
  - Sikhism in Abkhazia
- World Heritage Sites in Abkhazia: None

=== Art in Abkhazia ===
- Art in Abkhazia
- Cinema of Abkhazia
- Literature of Abkhazia
  - Abkhaz literature
- Music of Abkhazia
- Television in Abkhazia
- Theatre in Abkhazia

=== Sports in Abkhazia ===
Sports in Abkhazia

- Football in Abkhazia
- Abkhazia in the Olympics

== Economy and infrastructure of Abkhazia ==
Economy of Abkhazia

- Economic rank, by nominal GDP (2007):
- Banking in Abkhazia
  - National Bank of Abkhazia
- Communications in Abkhazia
  - Internet in Abkhazia
- Companies of Abkhazia
- Currency of Abkhazia: Ruble
  - ISO 4217: RUB
- Energy in Abkhazia
- Health care in Abkhazia
- Transportation in Abkhazia
  - Airports in Abkhazia
  - Rail transport in Abkhazia
  - Roads in Abkhazia

== Education in Abkhazia ==
- Education in Abkhazia

== See also ==
Abkhazia

- Index of Abkhazia-related articles
- List of Abkhazia-related topics
- List of international rankings
- Outline of Georgia (country)
