= Outline of Georgia (country) =

Country in the Caucasus region of Eurasia

The following outline is provided as an overview of and topical guide to Georgia:

The Flag of Georgia

The Coat of arms of Georgia

Georgia (country) – country in the Caucasus region of Eurasia, located at the crossroads of Western Asia and Eastern Europe. After a brief period of independence following the Russian Revolution of 1917, Georgia was occupied by Soviet Russia in 1921, becoming the Georgian Soviet Socialist Republic and part of the Soviet Union. After independence in 1991, post-communist Georgia suffered from civil unrest and economic crisis for most of the 1990s. This lasted until the Rose Revolution of 2003, after which the new government introduced democratic and economic reforms.

== General reference ==
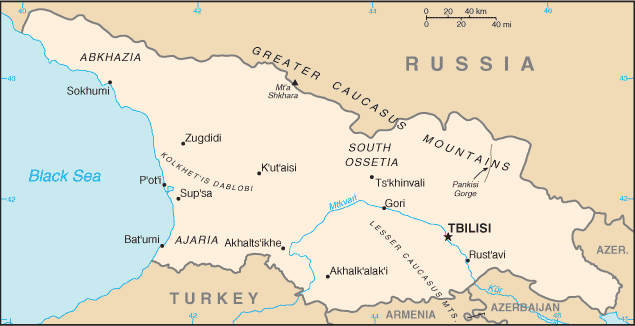
An enlargeable basic map of Georgia

- Pronunciation: /ˈdʒɔːrdʒə/ JOR-jə
- Common English country name: Georgia
- Official English country name: Georgia
- Common endonym: საქართველო (Sakartvelo)
- Official endonym: საქართველო (Sakartvelo)
- Adjectival: Georgian
- Demonym(s):
- Etymology: Name of Georgia (country)
- ISO country codes: GE, GEO, 268
- ISO region codes: See ISO 3166-2:GE
- Internet country code top-level domain: .ge

== Geography of Georgia ==
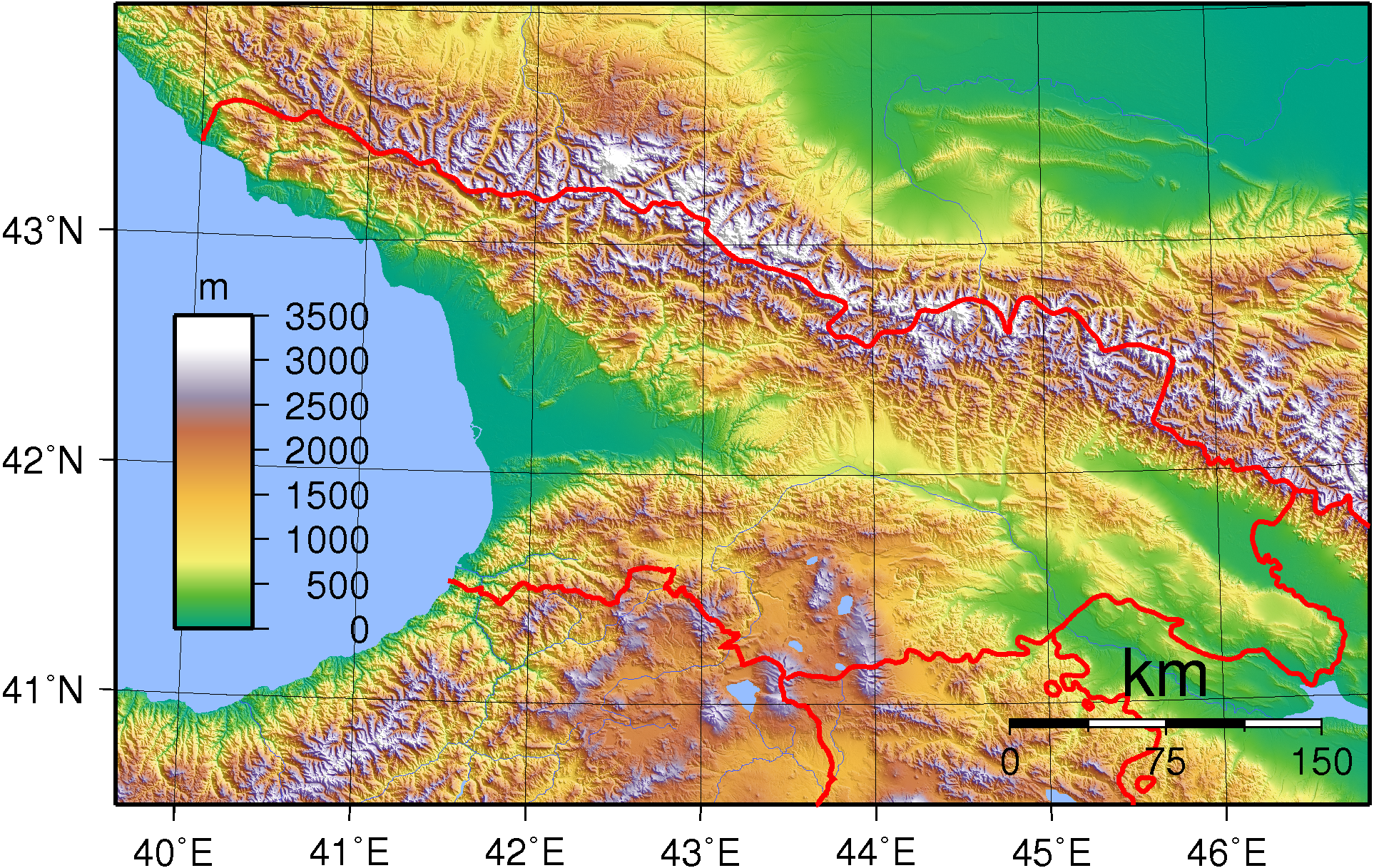
An enlargeable topographic map of Georgia

- Georgia is: a country
- Location:
  - Eurasia
    - Caucasus (between Europe and Asia)
      - South Caucasus
  - Time zone: UTC+04
  - Extreme points of Georgia
    - High: Shkhara 5,203 m (17,070 ft)
    - Low: Black Sea 0 m
  - Land boundaries: 1,461 km

Russia 723 km
Azerbaijan 322 km
Turkey 252 km
Armenia 164 km

- Coastline: Black Sea 310 km

- Area of Georgia (country): 69,700 km^{2}
- Atlas of Georgia

=== Environment of Georgia ===
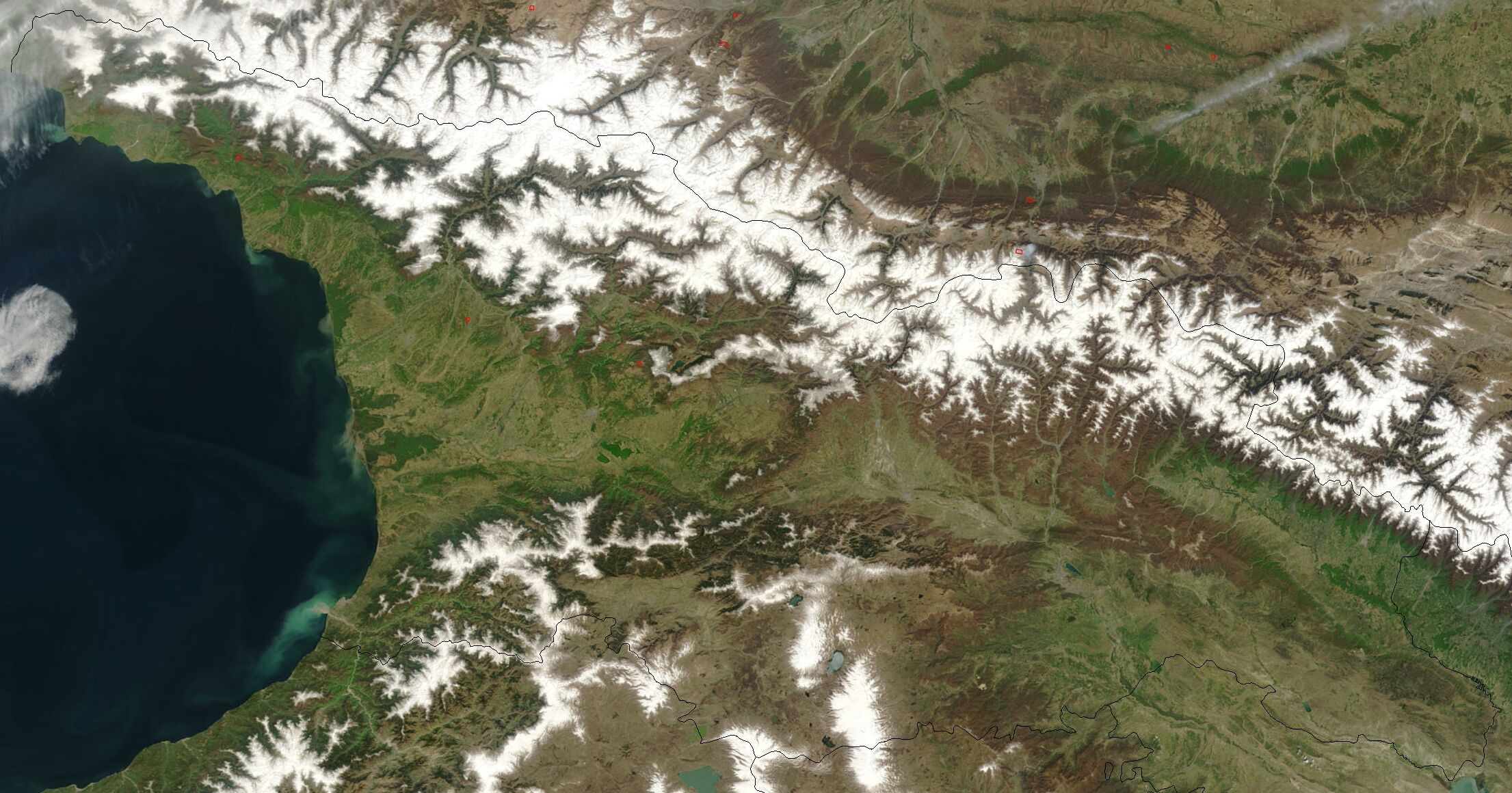
An enlargeable satellite image of Georgia

- Climate of Georgia
- Renewable energy in Georgia
- Geology of Georgia
- Protected areas of Georgia
  - Biosphere reserves in Georgia
  - National parks of Georgia
- Wildlife of Georgia
  - Fauna of Georgia
    - Birds of Georgia
    - Mammals of Georgia

==== Natural geographic features of Georgia ====
- Glaciers of Georgia
- Lakes of Georgia
- Mountains of Georgia
  - Volcanoes in Georgia
- Rivers of Georgia
  - Waterfalls of Georgia
- Valleys of Georgia
- World Heritage Sites in Georgia

=== Regions of Georgia ===
Regions of Georgia

==== Ecoregions of Georgia ====
List of ecoregions in Georgia

==== Administrative divisions of Georgia ====
- Occupied territories of Georgia
- Administrative divisions of Georgia (country)

===== Municipalities of Georgia =====
- Capital of Georgia: Tbilisi
- Cities of Georgia

== Government and politics of Georgia ==
- Form of government: semi-presidential representative democratic republic
- Capital of Georgia: Tbilisi
- Elections in Georgia
- Political parties in Georgia

=== Branches of the government of Georgia ===
==== Executive branch of the government of Georgia ====
- Head of state: President of Georgia,
- Head of government: Prime Minister of Georgia,
- Cabinet of Georgia

==== Legislative branch of the government of Georgia ====
- Parliament of Georgia (unicameral)

==== Judicial branch of the government of Georgia ====
Court system of Georgia

- Supreme Court of Georgia

=== Foreign relations of Georgia ===
Foreign relations of Georgia

- Diplomatic missions in Georgia
- Diplomatic missions of Georgia

==== International organization membership ====
Georgia is a member of:

- Asian Development Bank (ADB)
- Black Sea Economic Cooperation Zone (BSEC)
- Council of Europe (CE)
- Euro-Atlantic Partnership Council (EAPC)
- European Bank for Reconstruction and Development (EBRD)
- Food and Agriculture Organization (FAO)
- General Confederation of Trade Unions (GCTU)
- International Atomic Energy Agency (IAEA)
- International Bank for Reconstruction and Development (IBRD)
- International Chamber of Commerce (ICC)
- International Civil Aviation Organization (ICAO)
- International Criminal Court (ICCt)
- International Criminal Police Organization (Interpol)
- International Development Association (IDA)
- International Federation of Red Cross and Red Crescent Societies (IFRCS)
- International Finance Corporation (IFC)
- International Fund for Agricultural Development (IFAD)
- International Labour Organization (ILO)
- International Maritime Organization (IMO)
- International Monetary Fund (IMF)
- International Olympic Committee (IOC)
- International Organization for Migration (IOM)
- International Organization for Standardization (ISO) (correspondent)
- International Red Cross and Red Crescent Movement (ICRM)
- International Telecommunication Union (ITU)
- International Telecommunications Satellite Organization (ITSO)
- International Trade Union Confederation (ITUC)
- Inter-Parliamentary Union (IPU)
- Multilateral Investment Guarantee Agency (MIGA)
- Organisation internationale de la Francophonie (OIF) (observer)
- Organization for Democracy and Economic Development (GUAM)
- Organization for Security and Cooperation in Europe (OSCE)
- Organisation for the Prohibition of Chemical Weapons (OPCW)
- Organization of American States (OAS) (observer)
- Partnership for Peace (PFP)
- Southeast European Cooperative Initiative (SECI) (observer)
- United Nations (UN)
- United Nations Conference on Trade and Development (UNCTAD)
- United Nations Educational, Scientific, and Cultural Organization (UNESCO)
- United Nations Industrial Development Organization (UNIDO)
- Universal Postal Union (UPU)
- World Customs Organization (WCO)
- World Federation of Trade Unions (WFTU)
- World Health Organization (WHO)
- World Intellectual Property Organization (WIPO)
- World Meteorological Organization (WMO)
- World Tourism Organization (UNWTO)
- World Trade Organization (WTO)

=== Law and order in Georgia ===
Law of Georgia (country)

- Capital punishment in Georgia
- Constitution of Georgia
- Human rights in Georgia
  - LGBT rights in Georgia
  - Freedom of religion in Georgia
- Law enforcement in Georgia

=== Military of Georgia ===
Defense Forces of Georgia

- Command
  - Commander-in-chief:
    - Ministry of Defense of Georgia
- Forces
  - Georgian Land Forces
  - Coast Guard of Georgia
  - Georgian Air Force
  - Special forces of Georgia
- Military history of Georgia
- Military ranks of Georgia

== History of Georgia ==
- Military history of Georgia

== Culture of Georgia ==
- Architecture of Georgia
- Cuisine of Georgia
- Ethnic minorities in Georgia
- Festivals in Georgia
- Languages of Georgia
- Media in Georgia
- National symbols of Georgia
  - Coat of arms of Georgia
  - Flag of Georgia
  - National anthem of Georgia
- People of Georgia
- Public holidays in Georgia
- Records of Georgia
- Religion in Georgia
  - Christianity in Georgia
  - Islam in Georgia
  - Judaism in Georgia
  - Sikhism in Georgia
- World Heritage Sites in Georgia

=== Art in Georgia ===
- Art in Georgia
- Cinema of Georgia
- Literature of Georgia
- Music of Georgia
- Television in Georgia
- Theatre in Georgia

=== Sports in Georgia ===
- Football in Georgia
- Georgia at the Olympics

== Economy and infrastructure of Georgia ==
- Economic rank, by nominal GDP (2007): 116th (one hundred and sixteenth)
- Agriculture in Georgia
- Banking in Georgia
  - National Bank of Georgia
- Telecommunications in Georgia
- Companies of Georgia
- Currency of Georgia: Lari
  - ISO 4217: GEL
- Energy in Georgia (country)
  - Energy policy of Georgia
  - Oil industry in Georgia
- Healthcare in Georgia
- Mining in Georgia
- Georgia Stock Exchange
- Tourism in Georgia
- Transport in Georgia
  - Airports in Georgia
  - Rail transport in Georgia
  - Roads in Georgia

== See also ==
- List of international rankings
- Member state of the United Nations
- Outline of Abkhazia
- Outline of Asia
- Outline of Europe
- Outline of geography
- Outline of South Ossetia
