= List of country related articles in Asia =

This is an index of articles related to Asia. The transcontinental countries spanning Europe are also shown.

1. Index of Abkhazia-related articles
2. Index of Armenia-related articles
3. Index of Azerbaijan-related articles
4. Index of Bahrain-related articles
5. Index of Bangladesh-related articles
6. Index of Brunei-related articles
7. Index of Cambodia-related articles
8. Index of China (ROC)-related articles
9. Index of Cyprus-related articles
10. Index of East Timor-related articles
11. Index of Georgia-related articles
12. Index of India-related articles
13. Index of Indonesia-related articles
14. Index of Iran-related articles
15. Index of Israel-related articles
16. Index of Japan-related articles
17. Index of Jordan-related articles
18. Index of Kazakhstan-related articles
19. Index of Kuwait-related articles
20. Index of Kyrgyzstan-related articles
21. Index of Laos-related articles
22. Index of Malaysia-related articles
23. Index of Maldives-related articles
24. Index of Mongolia-related articles
25. Index of Nepal-related articles
26. Index of Oman-related articles
27. Index of Pakistan-related articles
28. Index of Philippines-related articles
29. Index of Qatar-related articles
30. Index of Saudi Arabia-related articles
31. Index of Singapore-related articles
32. Index of Turkey-related articles
33. Index of Turkmenistan-related articles
34. Index of United Arab Emirates-related articles
35. Index of Vietnam-related articles

== See also ==
- Lists of countries in Asia
