= Extreme points of Georgia =

Extreme points of Georgia may refer to:

- Extreme points of Georgia (country)
- Extreme points of Georgia (U.S. state)
