= Outline of Georgia =

Outline of Georgia may refer to:

- Outline of Georgia (country)
- Outline of Georgia (U.S. state)
