= Gennady Alamia =

Abkhazian politician

Gennady Shalikovich Alamia (Lomiya) (Russian: Геннадий Шаликович Аламиа (Ломия); born 24 June 1949 in Kutol, Abkhazia) is an Abkhazian politician, poet and playwright. He is the chairman of the Social-Democratic Party of Abkhazia and secretary-general of the World Congress of the Abkhaz-Abaza People.

He is also editor of Circassian World magazine. While studying at the Literary Institute of the Writer's Union of the Soviet Union, he met his future translator and co-author Denis Chachkhalia.

During Perestroika, Alamia led Aidgylara's eponymous newspaper and penned "Aiaaira", which became the national anthem of Abkhazia.

Alamia has written nine collections of poetry, six in Abkhaz and three in Russian, and has translated various works into Abkhaz.
