= Abkhazia–Nicaragua relations =

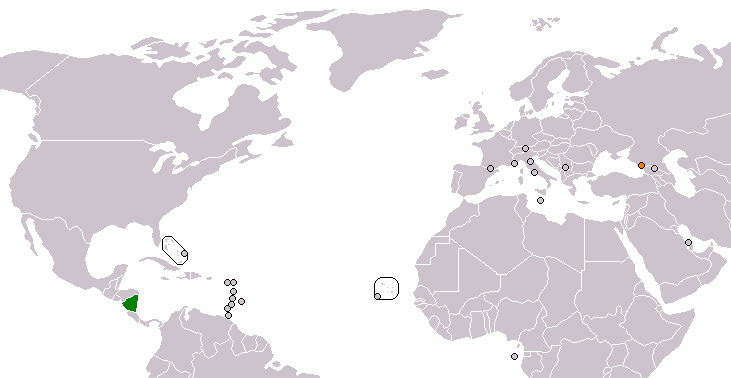

- Nicaragua: Abkhazia

Bilateral foreign relations between the Republic of Abkhazia and the Republic of Nicaragua were established on September 5, 2008, when Nicaragua extended diplomatic recognition to Abkhazia.

At a press conference in November 2008, Nicaraguan Foreign Minister Samuel Santos Lopez said, "Certainly, we think that the decision [to recognize independent Abkhazia and South Ossetia] was fair and appropriate. They [the republics] must be given time for inner formalities. We will coordinate the possibility and terms of direct diplomatic relations at a convenient moment. Obviously and logically, we will be acting via our friends, probably Russia, to establish closer contacts and diplomatic relations [with the republics]."

Abkhazia and Nicaragua formally established diplomatic relations on September 10, 2009, after an Abkhazian delegation visited with President Daniel Ortega in the Central American nation.

From 18 to 21 July 2010, a state delegation from Abkhazia visited Nicaragua headed by President Bagapsh. On 19 July, the delegation was joined by a delegation from South Ossetia headed by President Eduard Kokoity. On the same day, both Presidents attended the official events to the 31st birthday of the Sandinist Revolution. On 20 July, the Presidents of Abkhazia and Nicaragua signed agreements on friendship and cooperation, visa-free travel up to 90 days, trade-economic relations, commercial shipping, air services and cooperation between the National Bank of the Republic of Abkhazia and the Central Bank of Nicaragua. The Presidents also awarded each other the highest decorations of their countries.

On 16 April 2012, Abkhazia opened an embassy in Nicaragua when Zaur Gvajava (already ambassador to Venezuela) received his credentials from President Alexander Ankvab. On 27 June 2012, the Nicaraguan ambassador Luis Cuadra presented his credentials to Abkhazia's Foreign Minister Viacheslav Chirikba and to President Ankvab.

When inauguration of then-President of Abkhazia, Raul Khajimba in September 2014, the Nicaragua Delegation also represented and headed by Minister of Natural Resources Nicaragua attending inauguration of Raul Khajimba as the President of Abkhazia. The formal meeting was also held to strengthen bilateral ties between two countries as confirmed in the meeting with Chirikba in Sukhumi.

On 5 July 2016, Nicaragua's new ambassador Juan Ernesto Vasquez Araya presented his credentials to Chirikba and to President Raul Khajimba, and invited Khajimba to visit Nicaragua. Ambassador Araya appointed as Plenipotentiary Ambassador of Nicaragua to Russia and Abkhazia after Luis Cuadra was appointed as Vice Foreign Minister of Nicaragua. During the occasion, Chirikba expressed Abkhazia's intention to open a diplomatic mission in Managua.

During Daur Kove tenure as Minister of Foreign Affairs, several Official and Working Visit was held to strengthen bilateral relationship between Abkhazia and Nicaragua, in January 2017 for the re inauguration of Daniel Ortega, in July 2019, July 2020 and July 2021 respectively during Sandinistas Revolution celebration. In recent 2021, Daur Kove also signing Bilateral Cooperation Plan for 2022 and the Agreement on Sister Cities between Sukhumi and Managua with Minister Foreign Affairs of Nicaragua, Denis Moncada led Abkhazian delegation to be observer on the Presidential Election 2021 on 7 November 2021.

In 2019, both countries also delivered their credentials for ambassadors; from Abkhazia, non-resident ambassador, Zaur Gwajava as Plenipotentiary and Extraordinary Ambassador of Abkhazia to Venezuela and Nicaragua; and from Nicaragua, Alba Acusena Torres Meija as Plenipotentiary and Extraordinary Ambassador of Nicaragua to the Russian Federation and Abkhazia.

In 2020, an honorary consul was appointed by the Plenipotentiary Ambassador of the Republic of Nicaragua to the Russian Federation and the Republic of Abkhazia, Alba Acusena Torres Meija. Alias Khashba was appointed as the Nicaraguan honorary-counsel to Abkhazia.

By the Presidential Decree of the Abkhazia President, Aslan Bzhania, on 22 November 2021, the Embassy of the Abkhazia to the Nicaragua was established. It was upgraded after since 16 April 2012, the Embassy was approved with non-resident status that hold by Abkhazia Ambassador to Venezuela, Zaur Gwajava. Then, since 22 November 2021, the Embassy of Abkhazia to Nicaragua was formally launched by the Abkhazia Government.

== See also ==
- Foreign relations of Abkhazia
- Foreign relations of Nicaragua
- Nicaragua–South Ossetia relations
