= Daur Zantaria =

Abkhazia writer and journalist

- Born: 25 May 1953
- Died: 7 August 2001 (aged 48)
- Occupation: Short story writer
- Writing career
- Language: Russian

Daur Zantaria (Abkhaz: Даур Занҭариа) (25 May 1953 – 7 August 2001) was a writer and journalist from Abkhazia, publishing both in Abkhaz and Russian languages.

== Early life and education ==
Zantaria was born on 25 May 1953 in the village of Tamysh, Ochamchira District. He graduated with a gold medal from Tamysh high school in 1971 and with honours from the philological faculty of the Sukhum State Pedagogical Institute in 1975.

== Literary career ==
Zantaria published his first short story Kuasta in the magazine Alashara in 1976. In the following years, his short stories and poems appeared in Alashara, the children's magazine Amtsabz, the newspaper Apsny Kapsh and the almanac Literary Abkhazia. In 1984, Zantaria entered the Union of Soviet Writers. That same year, he participated in a workshop for script writers in Moscow by Valentin Yezhov and wrote the script for the film Souvenir, released in 1985.

On 19 January 1991, Zantaria presided over the founding congress of Abkhazia's first post-Soviet political party Democratic Party of Abkhazia. He had conceived of the idea of founding the party along with historian Guram Gumba and Russian poet Aleksandr Bardodym during a visit by the latter in 1990. The party was not revived following the 1992–1993 war with Georgia.

In the 1990s, Zantaria became a member of the Union of Abkhazian Writers and published stories, essays and articles for Novy Mir, Druzhba Narodov, Znamya, Expert, Obshchey Gazeta, as well as a number of novels and collections of short stories and poems.

== Death ==
Zantaria died on 7 August 2001. He lies buried in Tamysh.
