= Guram Gumba =

Abkhazian politician (born 1956)

Guram Gumba (born 22 July 1956) is a historian and politician from Abkhazia. At its founding congress On 19 January 1991, he became the first (and last) Chairman of the Democratic Party of Abkhazia, Abkhazia's first post-Soviet political party. Gumba had received the idea to found the party along with writer Daur Zantaria and Russian poet Aleksandr Bardodym during a visit by the latter in 1990. The party was not revived following the 1992–1993 war with Georgia.

In 2007, Gumba was elected to the 4th convocation of the People's Assembly of Abkhazia in constituency no. 14 (Duripsh), defeating Dmitri Ardzinba in the run-off with 1200 to 1126 votes. In Parliament, he was elected Chairman of the Committee for Inter-Parliamentary and Foreign Affairs. Gumba did not stand for re-election in 2012.
