= Tamara Shakryl =

Linguist; activist (c.1925–2004)

- Born: 1925 or 1926; November 12, 2004 (aged 78–79)
- Known for: Human rights
- Political party: Democratic Party of Abkhazia

Academic work
- Discipline: Linguistics
- Institutions: Abkhazian Academy of Sciences

Tamara Shakryl (Russian: Тамара Шакрыл; 1925 or 1926 – 12 November 2004) was a linguist, academic and human rights activist from Abkhazia.

Shakryl was a senior associate at the Institute for the Study of the Humanities at the Abkhazian Academy of Sciences. She was a strong supporter of Abkhaz independence, and had been sharply critical of major powers and international organizations for demanding that Abkhazia remain a province of Georgia.

in January 1991, Skakryl became a founding member of the Democratic Party of Abkhazia, Abkhazia's first, but short-lived, post-Soviet political party.

== Death ==
Shakryl was a prominent supporter of presidential candidate Raul Khadjimba. On 12 November 2004, she was among the supporters of Khadjimba who tried to resist the crowd of Khadjimba's rival candidate Sergei Bagapsh's supporters who stormed the parliament building as a drawn-out crisis over rigged elections neared its end. Reports of her death vary: some have claimed that guards fired into the air, others that Shakryl was hit by a ricochet. In any case, she was shot, and died in hospital later that day, at the age of 78.

== Aftermath ==
Shakryl's death caused outrage and marked a significant turning point in the political crisis. After her death, Bagapsh changed tactics, urging his supporters to leave the parliament building, but then to remain outside, in a similar tactic to that used successfully in the Orange Revolution in Ukraine several weeks later. Bagapsh's supporters then detained two presidential guards over Shakryl's death, and brought them to the prosecutor's office. Security forces loyal to outgoing president Vladislav Ardzinba (Khadjimba's mentor) subsequently launched a raid on the prosecutor's office and freed the two men. However, this only exacerbated tension, and resulted in the decision of 2,000 police members to refuse to follow government orders. In many ways as a result of this crisis, Khadjimba backed down several weeks later, agreeing to run as Bagapsh's deputy in a re-vote.

In January 2006, when the Abkhazian passport was introduced, Shakryl posthumously received the second passport to be issued, after Vladislav Ardzinba.
