= Democratic Party of Abkhazia =

- Leader: Guram Gumba
- Founded: 19 January 1991

The Democratic Party of Abkhazia was Abkhazia's first modern political party, existing around the time of the dissolution of the Soviet Union.

Historian Guram Gumba, writer Daur Zantaria and Russian poet Aleksandr Bardodym received the idea of creating the party when the latter visited Abkhazia in 1990. The founding congress was held on 19 January 1991 in the Abkhaz Drama Theatre in Sukhumi, and led by Zantaria, Gumba was elected the party's first (and last) Chairman. Among its other founding members were Natella Akaba, Georgi Gulia, Tamara Shakryl and Boris Kekhir-ipa. Another name suggested for the party was Democratic Union of Abkhazia.

Many of the party's leaders became active in Aidgylara and the Abkhazian government, and the party was not revived following the 1992–1993 war with Georgia.
