= List of airports in Abkhazia =

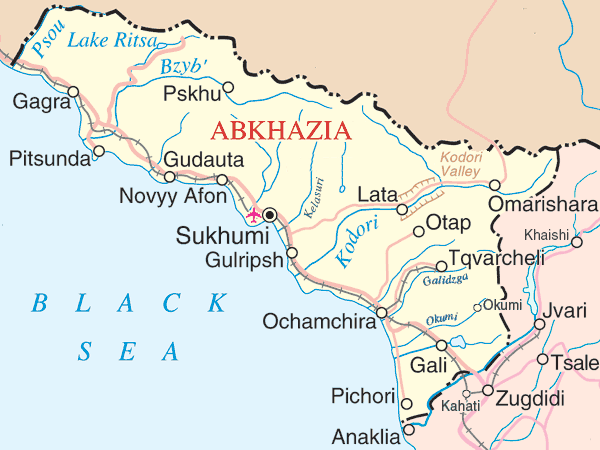
Map of Abkhazia

This is a list of airports in Abkhazia, grouped by type and sorted by location.^{[‡]}

== Airports ==
Airport names shown in bold indicate the airport has scheduled service on commercial airlines.

Location	Region	ICAO	IATA	Airport name	Coordinates
Public airports
Sukhumi	(capital)	UGSS / URAS	SUI	Sukhum International (Sukhumi Babushara Airport)	42°51′29″N 041°07′41″E
Military airports
Gudauta	Gudauta			Gudauta air base	43°06′14″N 040°34′45″E

^{‡} The status of Abkhazia is disputed, with Georgia claiming it as an autonomous republic (see: Abkhazia and International recognition of Abkhazia and South Ossetia).

== See also ==
- Georgian Air Force and Abkhazian Air Force
- List of airports by ICAO code: U#UG - Abkhazia
- Wikipedia: WikiProject Aviation/Airline destination lists: Asia#Abkhazia
