= Aiaaira =

National anthem of Abkhazia

English: Victory
- Аиааира
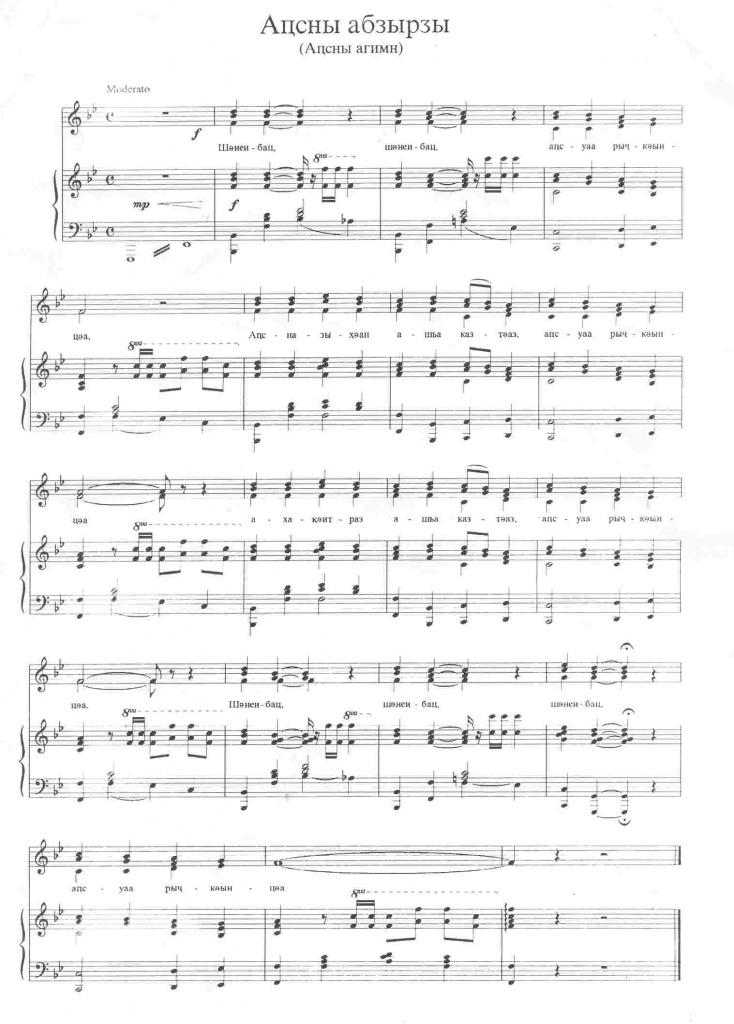
- Sheet music
- National anthem of Abkhazia
- Lyrics: Gennady Alamia
- Music: Valery Chkadua
- Adopted: October 2007, 24; 18 years ago

Audio sample
- Official orchestral and choral vocal recording: file; help

Other official recordings
Orchestral and choral vocal recording (short version)

Orchestral instrumental recording

Orchestral instrumental recording (short version)

Orchestral instrumental recording (short version) (version 2)

Piano and choral vocal recording

"Aiaaira" (Abkhaz: Аиааира; "Victory") is the national anthem of the partially recognized state of Abkhazia. (Note: The political status of Abkhazia is disputed. Having unilaterally declared independence from Georgia in 1992, Abkhazia is formally recognised as an independent state by 5 UN member states (two other states previously recognised it but then withdrew their recognition), while the remainder of the international community recognizes it as de jure Georgian territory. Georgia continues to claim the area as its own territory, designating it as Russian-occupied territory.) The lyrics were written by poet Gennady Alamia, and the music was composed by Valery Chkadua.

== History ==
The lyrics were written after Abkhazia's proclamation of independence in 1992. They used as inspiration the Abkhazian revolutionary song "Kiaraz" (Abkhaz: "Кьараз") that originated during the short-lived Democratic Republic of Georgia (1918–1921).

In 1994, after the war for independence with Georgia, Valery Chkadua composed the anthem at the personal request of the first Abkhazian President Vladislav Ardzinba. Chkadua, who studied under Sergei Prokofiev and Dmitry Shostakovich, included various folk motives in the anthem. Chkadua, who refused royalties for the work, had written the anthem in the winter in a freezing, unheated house, but received housing as a thank you from the president.

The anthem was officially adopted by the People's Assembly on 24 October 2007 in the constitutional law of the Republic of Abkhazia "On the State Anthem of the Republic of Abkhazia", No. 1873-s-IV, signed by President Sergei Bagapsh on 2 November 2007.

== Lyrics ==
Abkhaz lyrics

Шәнеибац, шәнеибац,
Аԥсуаа рыҷкәынцәа!
Аԥсны азыҳәан ашьа казҭәаз,
Аԥсуаа рыҷкәынцәа!
Ахақәиҭраз ашьа казҭәаз,
Аԥсуаа рыҷкәынцәа!

О-ҳо-ҳо-о-ҳо-о-Рада (Note: Sometimes written О-ҳо-ҳо-о ҳо-о-Рада (O-ho-ho-o ho-o-Rada).)
О-ҳо-ҳо-о-ҳо-Раида-ра! (Note: Sometimes written О-ҳо-ҳо-о ҳо-о-Рада-Ра! (O-ho-ho-o ho-o-Rada-Ra!).)
Ажәҩан мрадоуп, еҵәадоуп
Уара уда, Аԥсынра!
Еҵәа-бырлаш Аԥсынтәыла, (Note: Sometimes written Аԥсынтәла (Apsynṭwla).)
Улԥха згәаҵақәа ирҭыԥхо,
Геи-шьхеи рыԥшӡара зыԥшнылаз (Note: Sometimes written заԥшнылаз (zapšnylaz).)
Жәлар ламысла иҳаракхоит. (Note: Sometimes written иҳаракоит (iharaḳoiṭ).)

Рада, Раида, (Note: Sometimes written Реида (Reida).) Рарира!
Рада, Рерама, Рерашьа!
Нарҭаа риира-зиироу
Афырхацәа Ран-Гәашьа (Note: Sometimes written Ран-Гуашьа (Ran-Guasja).)
Аԥсынтәыла-иԥшьоу (Note: Sometimes written иԥшьоч (ipsjocj).) атәыла,
Ихы (Note: Sometimes written Зхы (Zxy).) здиныҳәалаз Анцәа!
Зқьышықәсала имҩасхьо гылан, (Note: Sometimes written Зқьышықәасала имҩасхьо гылоуп (Zkjyšykwasala imüasxjo gylouṗ).)
Рыжәҩа еибырҭоиҭ уԥацәа! (Note: Sometimes written Рыжәаҩа еибырҭоит уԥацәа (Ryžwaüa eibyrtoiṭ upacwa).)

Шәнеибац, Аԥсныжәлар!
Аишьцәа, шәнеибац!
Нхыҵ-аахыҵ ҳаицуп!
Ҳазшаз илаԥш
Ҳхыуп иаҳхымшәо (Note: Sometimes written иаҳхымәо (iahxymšwo).)
Ԥеиԥш лаша ҳзыԥшуп! (Note: Sometimes written Ԥеԥш лаша ҳзышуп (Pepš laša hzyšuṗ).)

Шәнеибац, Аԥсныжәлар,
Игылеит ҳамра,
Иақәым ҭашәара!
Урылагәырӷьа, (Note: Sometimes written Урылагәыргьа (Urylagwyrgja).)
Анра-ахшара, (Note: Sometimes written аҳшара (ahšara).)
Шьардаамҭа, Аԥсынра!

Romanization of Abkhaz

Šwneibac, šwneibac,
Apsuaa ryċjḳwyncwa.
Apsny azyhwan asja ḳaztwaz,
Apsuaa ryċjḳwyncwa.
Axakwitraz asja ḳaztwaz,
Apsuaa ryċjḳwyncwa.

O-ho-ho-o-ho-o-Rada
O-ho-ho-o-ho-Raida-ra!
Ažwüan mradouṗ, eċwadouṗ
Uara uda, Apsynra!
Eċwa-byrlaš Apsynṭwyla,
Ulpxa zgwaċakwa irtypxo,
Gei-sjxei rypšdzara zypšnylaz
Žwlar lamysla iharaḳxoiṭ.

Rada, Raida, Rarira
Rada, Rerama, Rerasja.
Nartaa riira-ziirou
Afyrxacwa Ran-Gwasja
Apsynṭwyla-ipsjou aṭwyla
Ixy zdinyhwalaz Ancwa!
Zkjyšykwsala imüasxjo gylan,
Ryžwüa eibyrtoit upacwa!

Šwneibac, Apsnyžwlar!
Aisjcwa, šwneibac!
Nxyċ-aaxyċ haicuṗ!
Hazšaz ilapš
Hxyuṗ iahxymšwo
Peipš laša hzypšuṗ!

Šwneibac, Apsnyžwlar!
Igyleiṭ hamra,
Iakwym tašwara!
Urylagwyrġja,
Anra-axšara,
Sjardaamta, Apsynra!

IPA transcription (Note: See Help:IPA/Abkhaz and Abkhaz alphabet.)

[ʃʷnejbɑt͡sʰ ʃʷnejbɑt͡sʰ]
[ɑpʰswɑː ɾət͡ʃʼkʷʼənt͡ɕʰʷɑ]
[ɑpʰsnə‿ɑzəħʷɑn ɑʃɑ kʼɑztʰʷɑz]
[ɑpʰswɑː ɾət͡ʃʼkʷʼənt͡ɕʰʷɑ]
[ɑχɑkʷitʰɾɑz ɑʃɑ kʼɑztʰʷɑz]
[ɑpʰswɑː ɾət͡ʃʼkʷʼənt͡ɕʰʷɑ]

[o.ħo.ħo.o.ħo.o.ɾɑdɑ]
[o.ħo.ħo.o.ħo.ɾɑjdɑ.ɾɑ]
[ɑʒʷɥɑn mɾɑdowpʼ et͡ɕʷʼɑdowpʼ]
[wɑɾɑ udɑ ɑpʰsənrɑ]
[et͡ɕʷʼɑ.bəɾɫɑʂ ɑpʰsəntʷʼəɫɑ]
[uɫpʰχɑ zɡʷɑt͡sʼɑkʷɑ‿iɾtʰəpʰχo]
[gejʃ.χej ɾəpʰʂd͡zɑɾɑ zəpʰʂnəɫɑz]
[ʒʷɫɑɾ ɫɑməsɫɑ‿iħɑɾɑkʼχojtʼ]

[ɾɑdɑ ɾɑjdɑ ɾɑɾiɾɑ]
[ɾɑdɑ ɾeɾɑmɑ ɾeɾɑʃɑ]
[nɑɾtʰɑː ɾiːɾɑ.ziːɾow]
[ɑfəɾχɑt͡ɕʰʷɑ ɾɑn.ɡʷɑʃɑ]
[ɑpʰsəntʷʼəɫɑ.ipʰʃow ɑtʷʼəɫɑ‿]
[‿iχə zdinəħʷɑɫɑz ɑnt͡ɕʰʷɑ]
[zcəʂəkʷsɑɫɑ‿imɥɑsço gəɫɑn]
[ɾəʒʷɥ(ɑ)‿ejbəɾtʰojtʰ upʰɑt͡ɕʰʷɑ]

[ʃʷnejbɑt͡sʰ ɑpʰsnəʒʷɫɑɾ]
[ɑjʃt͡ɕʰʷɑ ʃʷnejbɑt͡sʰ]
[nχət͡sʼ.ɑːχət͡sʼ ħɑjt͡sʰupʼ]
[ħɑzʂɑz iɫɑpʰʂ]
[ħχəwpʼ jɑħχəmʃʷo]
[pʰejpʰʂ ɫɑʂɑ ħzəpʰʂupʼ]

[ʃʷnejbɑt͡sʰ ɑpʰsnəʒʷɫɑɾ]
[(i)gəɫejtʼ ħɑmɾɑ]
[jɑkʷəm tʰɑʃʷɑɾɑ]
[(u)ɾəɫɑɡʷərʝɑ]
[ɑnɾɑ.ɑħʂɑɾɑ]
[ʃɑɾdɑːmtʰɑ ɑpʰsənɾɑː]

English translation

March on, march on,
sons of Abkhazia!
Shed blood for Abkhazia,
sons of Abkhazia!
Shed blood for independence,
sons of Abkhazia!

O-ho-ho-o-ho-o-rada!
O-ho-ho-o-ho-radara!
Like the sun in the sky, starry
you are always Abkhazia!
Heavenly pearl Abkhazia
Your love has warmed countless hearts,
with mountains and seas put on you.
People conscience also puts on you.

Rada, Reyda, Rarira!
Rada, Rerama, Rerasha!
where Nart is born – how sacred!
Mother of the hero
Abkhazia, may the world bless you
for thousands more years to come.
Children unite as one people,
Brothers shoulder to shoulder!

March on, People of Abkhazia!
Brothers, march on!
Living on both sides of the Caucasian ridge.
Under the gaze of the One who created us
we're always here,
for a better future!

March on, People of Abkhazia!
Our sun is rising
What a bright future!
Until sunset love shall grow,
Mother who gave birth to us
Eternal Abkhazia!

== See also ==
- List of national anthems
