= List of companies of Abkhazia =

Location of Abkhazia

Abkhazia is a partially recognised state on the eastern coast of the Black Sea and the south-western flank of the Caucasus, south of Russia and northwest of Georgia proper. Its capital is Sukhumi. The separatist Abkhazian polity, formally the Republic of Abkhazia or Apsny, is recognised only by Russia and a small number of other countries. While Georgia lacks control over Abkhazia, the Georgian government, the United Nations and the majority of the world's governments consider Abkhazia part of Georgia, whose constitution designates the area the Autonomous Republic of Abkhazia.

The economy of Abkhazia is heavily integrated with Russia and uses the Russian ruble as its currency. Abkhazia has experienced a modest economic upswing since the 2008 South Ossetia war and Russia's subsequent recognition of Abkhazia's independence. About half of Abkhazia's state budget is financed with aid money from Russia.

Tourism is a key industry and, according to Abkhazia's authorities, almost a million tourists (mainly from Russia) came to Abkhazia in 2007. Abkhazia also enjoys fertile lands and an abundance of agricultural products, including tea, tobacco, wine and fruits (especially tangerines and hazelnuts). Electricity is largely supplied by the Inguri hydroelectric power station located on the Inguri River between Abkhazia and Georgia (proper) and operated jointly by both parties.

== Notable firms ==
This list includes notable companies with primary headquarters located in the country. The industry and sector follow the Industry Classification Benchmark taxonomy. Organizations which have ceased operations are included and noted as defunct.

Notable companies Status: P=Private, S=State; A=Active, D=Defunct
Name	Industry	Sector	Headquarters	Founded	Notes	Status	
A-Mobile	Telecommunications	Mobile telecommunications	Sukhumi	2006	Mobile network	P	A
Abkhazian State Television and Radio Broadcasting Company	Consumer services	Broadcasting & entertainment	Sukhumi	1976	State owned media	S	A
Aquafon	Telecommunications	Fixed line telecommunications	Sukhumi	2003	Telecom	P	A
Chernomorenergo	Utilities	Electricity	Sukhumi	1993	State power and distribution	S	A
National Bank of the Republic of Abkhazia	Financials	Banks	Sukhumi	1991	Central bank	P	A

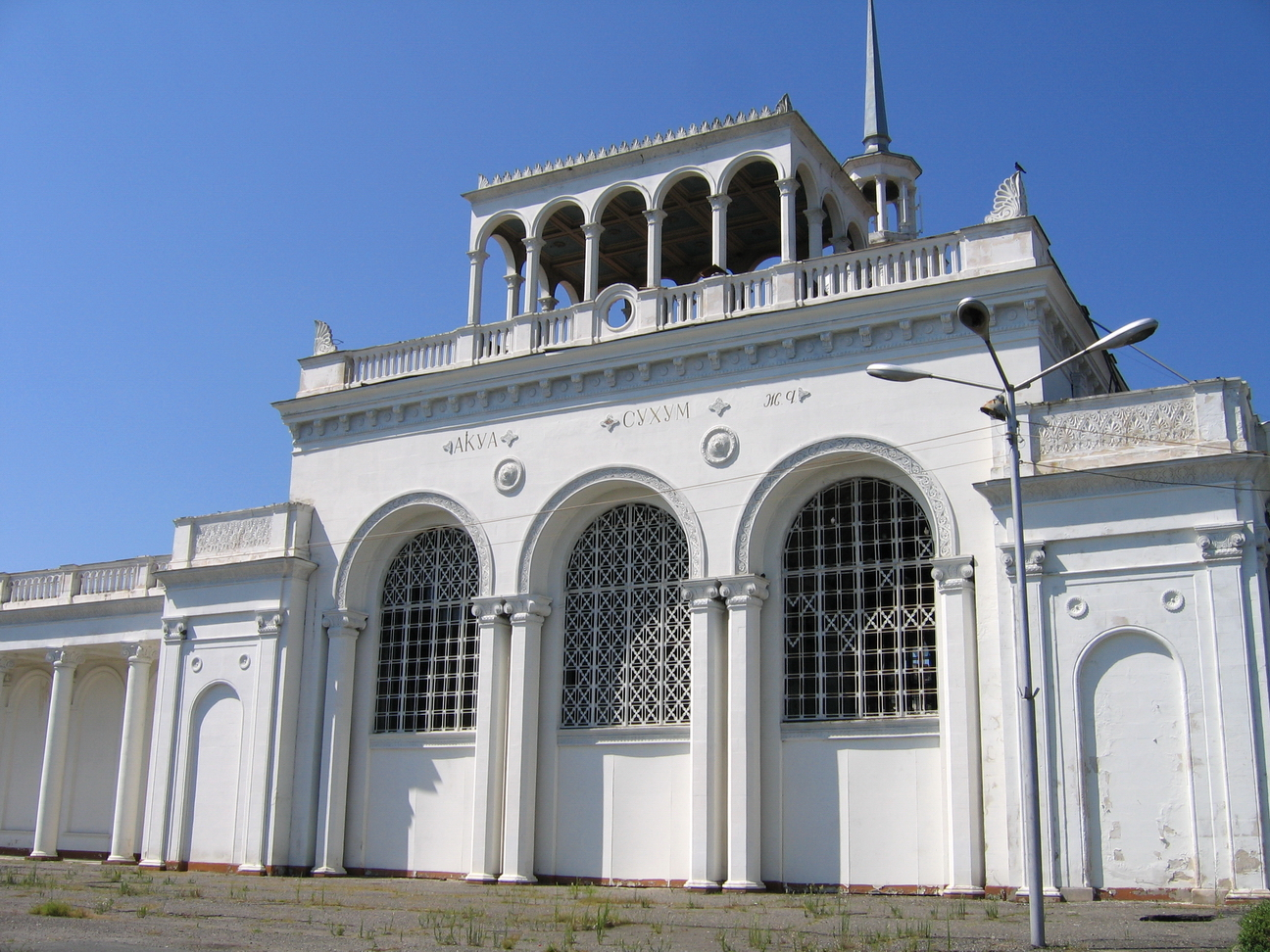
Sukhumi railway station.

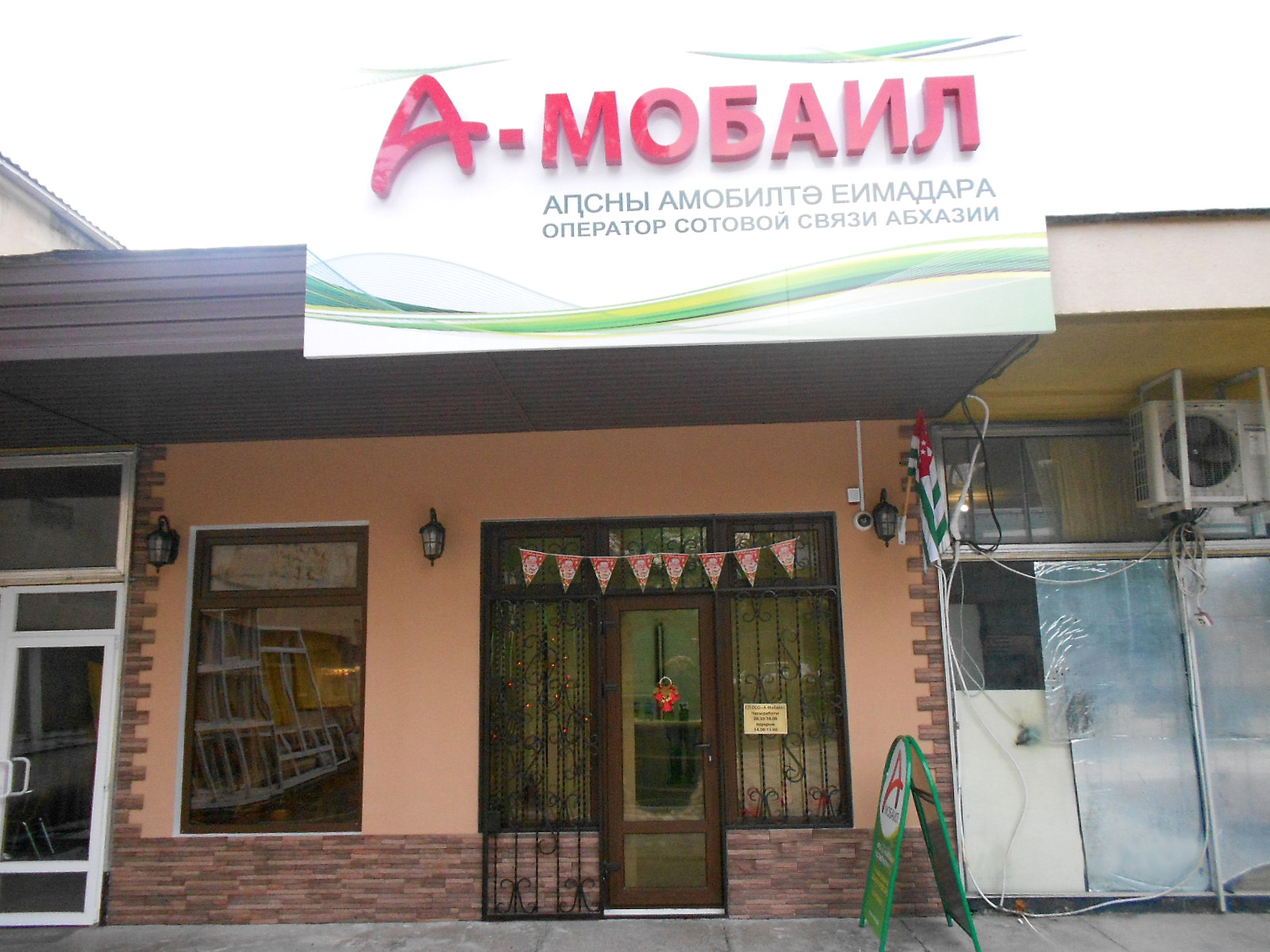
A-Mobile storefront.

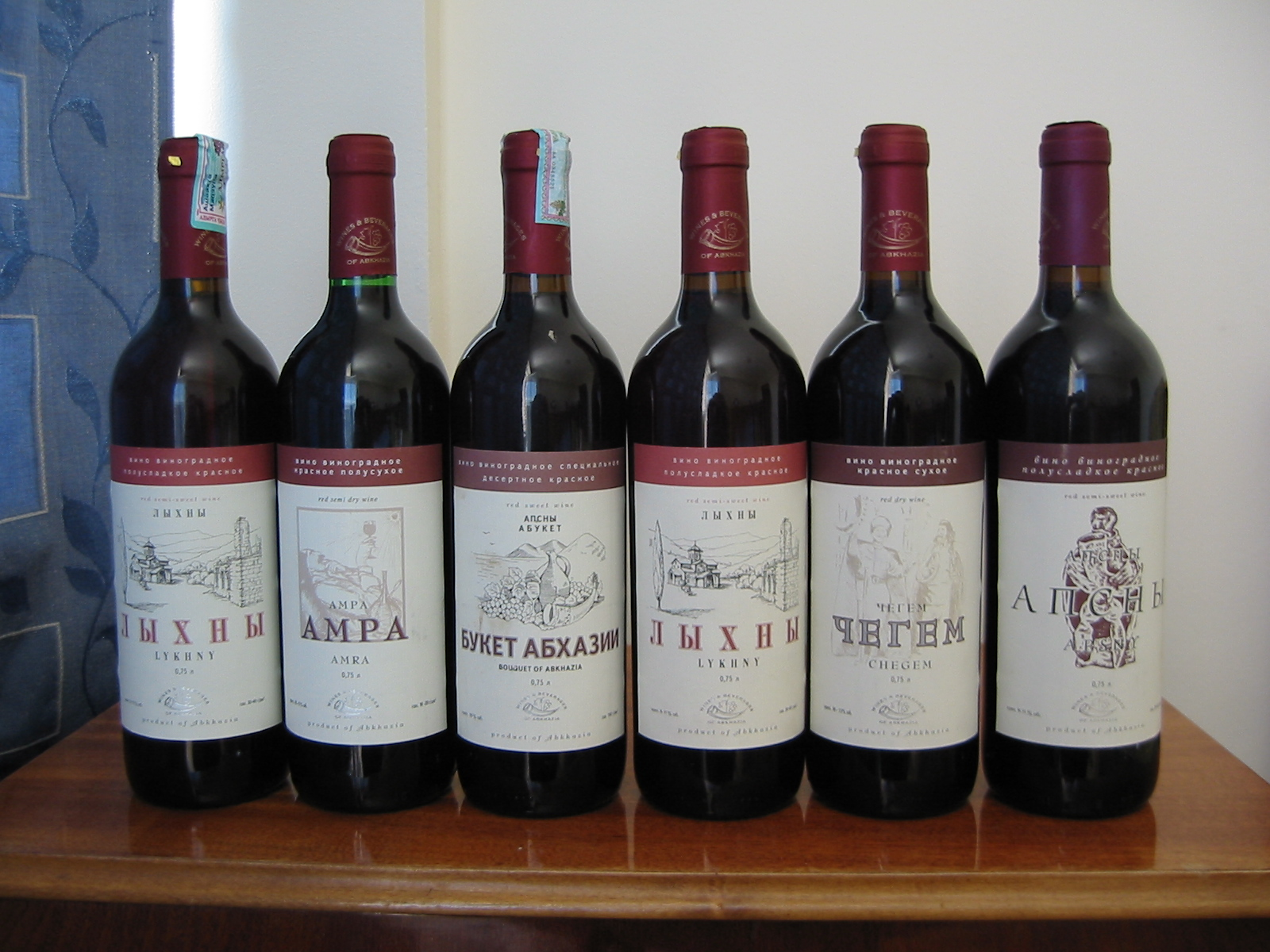
Abkhazia wine selections.
