= Natella Akaba =

Abkhazian historian

Natella Nurievna Akaba (Abkhaz: Нателла Нури-иҧҳа Акаба; Russian: Нателла Нуриевна Акаба; born 14 March 1945) is a historian, politician and civil society leader from Abkhazia.

== Early life and career in academia ==
Akaba was born on 14 March 1945 in Moscow. In 1955, her family moved back to Sukhumi. In 1962, Akaba graduated from high school no. 10 (Nestor Lakoba) in Sukhumi. From 1962 to 1967, she studied ethnography at the History faculty of the Moscow State University. In the following years, she was a literary assistant at the newspaper Soviet Abkhazia.

In 1976, Akaba graduated from the Institute of Oriental Studies of the USSR Academy of Sciences in Moscow. She subsequently moved to Yerevan where in 1979 she started teaching history at the Yerevan State University and the Yerevan Politechnic Institute. In 1981, Akaba defended her thesis entitled "The Colonial Policy of English Imperialism in Qatar" at the Institute of Oriental Studies.

In 1989, Akaba became associate professor and moved back to Sukhumi, to work in the department of general history at the Abkhazian State University.

== Career in politics and civil society ==
In 1990, Akaba became a member of the presidium of the People's Forum Aidgylara. In January 1991, she became a founding member of the Democratic Party of Abkhazia, Abkhazia's first, but short-lived, post-Soviet political party.

In 1991, Akaba was elected to the Supreme Soviet of Abkhazia where she became Deputy Chairman of the committee for human rights and interethnic relations. From 1994 to 1995 Akaba was Minister for Information and Press. She remained a member of Parliament until the next election in 1996.

Akaba has also headed the Centre for Democracy and Human Rights and the Association of Women of Abkhazia.

In 2007, Akaba became the first Secretary of the Public Chamber of Abkhazia upon its establishment. She was re-elected to the position in 2010, on 29 October 2013 and on 2 November 2016. She stepped down in 2019.
