= Public Chamber of Abkhazia =

The Public Chamber of Abkhazia is an advisory body to the President of the internationally partially recognised Republic of Abkhazia.

== Creation of the Public Chamber ==
The Law on the Public Chamber of Abkhazia took effect on January 1, 2007, and the first session of the Public Chamber was opened by President Bagapsh on July 20. The purposes of the Public Chamber are to:

- Facilitate public participation in politics
- Carry out consultations amongst the public
- Formulate recommendations on draft laws
- Advise the president on matters of civil society development
- Act as a public watchdog over the activities of executive government institutions and freedom of expression in Abkhazia

== Composition ==
The Public Chamber is composed of 35 members drawn from civil society, 13 of whom are nominated by the president, 11 by local administrations; and 11 by political parties and social movements.

The Chamber is headed by a secretary, who is currently Natella Akaba. Other members include the rector of the Abkhazian State University, Aleko Gvaramia; the writers Alexei Gogoi and Daur Nachkebia; and former Prime Minister Sokrat Jinjolia.

On 29 October 2013, Natella Akaba was reelected Secretary, while former Prime Minister Viacheslav Tsugba and Valeri Ardzinba were elected Deputy Chairmen.

On 2 November 2016, Akaba was again reelected as Secretary, and Danil Ubiria and Valeri Ardzinba as deputy secretaries.
