= 2012 in Abkhazia =

- Decades: 1990s; 2000s; 2010s; 2020s
- See also: Other events of 2012; Timeline of Abkhaz history

Events in the year 2012 in Abkhazia.

== Incumbents ==
- President: Alexander Ankvab
- Vice President: Mikhail Logua
- Prime Minister: Leonid Lakerbaia
- Speaker of Parliament: Nugzar Ashuba to April 3 Valeri Bganba

== Events ==
=== February ===
- February 22 – Alexander Ankvab, president of Abkhazia, survives the sixth assassination attempt as his motorcade is ambushed on the road from Gudauta to Sukhumi.

=== May ===
- May 24 — In Chuburkhinji a settlement is opened for the families of Russian border guards.
- May 28 — Two policemen and one local resident sitting are shot dead in a cafe in Gali.
- May 30 — 37 repatriated members of the Abkhaz diaspora and their families receive restored apartments in Machara.

=== June ===
- June 4 — Valeri Kvarchia defeats Aida Ashuba in the second round of the rerun of the parliamentary election in constituency no. 21.
- June 4 — The Psyrtskha power plant in New Athos is reopened after repairs that started in September 2008.
- June 9 — Three prisoners escape from Dranda prison — two brothers from Shashikvara, Gali District, convicted for armed robberies and kidnapping, and one man from Grigolishi in Georgia's Zugdidi District convicted for the smuggling of weapons and drugs.
- June 11 — Two of the three prisoners who escaped on 9 June are captured in Ganachleba, Gulripshi District.
- June 21 — The last of the prisoners who escaped on 9 June is found dead in the Kodori river bed in Adziubzha, Ochamchira District.
- June 25 — Former Interior Minister Leonid Dzapshba is indicted for the abuse of funds at his disposal as the head of the Abkhazian Football Federation.

== Deaths ==
- May 25 – Timur Logua, Deputy of the People's Assembly (born 1972).

== See also ==
- 2012 in Georgia
