= Social-Democratic Party of Abkhazia =

Social-Democratic Party of Abkhazia Социал-демократическая партия Абхазии აფხაზეთის სოციალ–დემოკრატიული პარტია
- Leader: Gennady Alamia
- Founded: October 15, 2004
- Ideology: Social democracy

The Social-Democratic Party of Abkhazia (Russian: Социал-демократическая партия Абхазии; Georgian: სოციალურ დემოკრატიული პარტიის აფხაზეთის, romanized: sotsialur demok'rat'iuli p'art'iis apkhazetis) is an oppositional political party in Abkhazia. It was founded during the crisis that followed the October 2004 presidential election by people from the presidential campaign of Sergei Shamba, who had come third in the election. Besides Shamba himself, initial members included his vice presidential candidate Vladimir Arshba, chief of staff Gennady Alamia and former vice premier Albert Topolian. The foundational congress of the Social-Democratic Party took place on 15 October 2005 in the State Drama Theatre of Abkhazia, where Gennadi Alamia was elected its first chairman. The Union of Social-Democratic Youth was founded as the party's youth wing, headed by Abkhazian State University student Astamur Logua.

The Social-Democratic Party called on voters to boycott the new presidential election on 12 January 2005 held as a result of the power-sharing agreement reached between Sergei Bagapsh and Raul Khajimba.

The Social-Democratic Party and the Union of Social-Democratic Youth were two of the 12 organisations that stood at the basis of the Forum of Abkhaz People's Unity founded on 8 February 2005 and Gennadi Alamia became its first chairman.

The new election was won by the joint Bagapsh-Khajimba ticket and Sergei Shamba became the new Minister for Foreign Affairs, but the Social-Democratic Party stayed in opposition.

On 20 May 2009 the Social-Democratic Party was one of a number of opposition parties that during a press conference strongly criticised the government's foreign policy. The criticism was rejected by Shamba two days later, dismissing it as "biased".
