= Human rights in Abkhazia =

Overview of human rights in the breakaway region of Abkhazia

Human rights in Abkhazia are granted by Chapter II of its Constitution which makes reference to adherence of Abkhazia to UDHR, ICCPR and ICESCR (Article 11). However, Abkhazia is not a UN member state and is not a party of UN human rights treaties, unlike Georgia, whose sovereignty over Abkhazia is recognized by a bigger part of the international community.

Abkhazia is classified as partly free by Freedom House. In its 2024 report, the organization highlighted ongoing issues including a flawed criminal justice system, systemic discrimination against ethnic Georgians, and extensive official corruption. Independent assessments have noted that while de facto legislation generally incorporates international standards, implementation is often hampered by corruption, political interference, and a lack of professionalism in law enforcement. The United States Department of State characterizes Abkhazia as a Russian-occupied region where de facto authorities are supported by Russian forces, noting significant human rights issues including unlawful detentions and restrictions on property rights for ethnic Georgians.

Legal scholars often analyze the human rights situation through the lens of "remedial secession"—the theory that a group has a right to independence if it is subjected to "gross and systematic" violations by a parent state. Supporters point to the 1990s conflict as a period of extreme persecution, while critics argue that the threshold for remedial secession was not legally met, noting that ethnic Abkhaz held significant political representation in the Georgian legislature prior to the 1992 secession.

In the 1990s, ethnic cleansing of Georgians took place in Abkhazia; many ethnic Georgians remain displaced persons to this day.

== Domestic and international institutions ==
A post of Human Rights Commissioner exists under the President of Abkhazia. The local human rights commissioner's office has highlighted cases of alleged torture and mistreatment of detainees in prisons and detention centers, which are reported to be in poor condition.

The UN Human Rights Office Abkhazia, Georgia (HROAG), was established in 1996 to protect and promote human rights in the region. The OSCE Mission to Georgia supported these efforts by contributing seconded Human Rights Officers to the HROAG and funding various local projects. However, the mission—which has been characterized as a failure by analysts for its inability to prevent the 2008 escalation despite nearly two decades of mediation—was officially concluded in June 2009 after its mandate expired without a consensus for renewal.

The mission's 2009 closure effectively negated years of OSCE efforts to develop civil society and build confidence between the conflict parties. These now-defunct initiatives included human rights education for approximately 3,000 children in schools in the Ochamchire District and providing management training and grants to civil society organizations in the Gali district. According to the International Committee of the Red Cross (ICRC), more than 2,300 individuals remain missing following the 1992–93 war and the 2008 conflict.

== Judiciary and law enforcement ==
The judicial system in Abkhazia faces systemic challenges related to independence and enforcement. While the court system has been described by international observers as having a degree of professional competence, the practical enforcement of judicial decisions—particularly in civil disputes and property cases—remains notably low. Domestic legal experts have noted that political pressures and "clan" ties frequently undermine the impartiality of legal proceedings, while law enforcement agencies are often perceived as lacking the necessary training to meet international human rights standards regarding the treatment of suspects and detainees. Scholarly analysis indicates that the rule of law is frequently undermined when judicial action is subject to "political whim" or personal relationships rather than strict constitutional adherence.

Significant human rights concerns include credible reports of torture and cruel, inhuman, or degrading treatment in detention facilities. Facilities such as the one in Dranda have been reported as having poor physical conditions, and de facto authorities have been criticized for a lack of transparency regarding internal investigations into law enforcement abuses.

== Media ==
The media sector is dominated by the state, which operates the Abkhaz State Television and Radio Company (AGTRK), though private outlets and social media discussions are vibrant. However, criminal libel statutes remain in place, and self-censorship is common regarding sensitive topics such as relations with Tbilisi.

Historically, international missions worked to improve media freedom through journalist exchanges across the conflict divide and by engaging local commercial TV stations in Sukhumi to produce human rights awareness programming. However, in December 2023, the Ministry of Foreign Affairs banned international financing of media projects covering Abkhazia’s domestic and foreign policies, a move seen by observers as a threat to the survival of independent news sources.

== Constitution and ethnicity ==
The Constitution allows only persons of Abkhaz ethnicity who speak the Abkhaz language to be President of Abkhazia (Article 49). While the translation "Abkhazian nationality" is sometimes used, the Russian text uses the term национальность (natsionalnost), clearly indicating ethnicity. Ethnic Abkhaz exercise disproportionate control over the political sphere; as of 2023, 32 of the 35 members of the People's Assembly have Abkhaz surnames, with the remainder being of Armenian descent.

Scholars at Lewis & Clark Law School highlight that although the Constitution incorporates Western standards like "checks and balances," the systematic disenfranchisement of ethnic Georgians—who are largely barred from voting or parliamentary membership—means the de facto state lacks the "consent of the governed" for a large segment of its population.

== Civil society and international organizations ==
Civil society groups historically exerted significant influence, but have faced increasing state pressure. In November 2023, a presidential decree required all international organizations to disclose their budgets and local partners to the Ministry of Foreign Affairs.

Legal scholars note that Abkhazia's de facto sovereignty is compromised by its heavy institutional dependence on Russia. This relationship, often described as "outsourcing" statehood, includes military base agreements signed for 49 years and substantial financial subsidies, including higher pensions paid by the Russian government compared to those offered by Georgia. By December 2023, the government implemented a full ban on projects financed by USAID and prohibited any projects aimed at establishing "contacts between Abkhazian and Georgian citizens." The regional director of USAID was subsequently declared persona non grata. U.S. State Department reports have highlighted a growing rhetoric from de facto authorities targeting NGOs as "foreign agents"—a trend that parallels legislation in Russia.

== Discrimination of ethnic Georgians ==
Ethnic Georgians, particularly in the Gali district where they comprise approximately 98% of the population, face systemic discrimination and barriers to basic civil rights.

=== Documentation and legal status ===
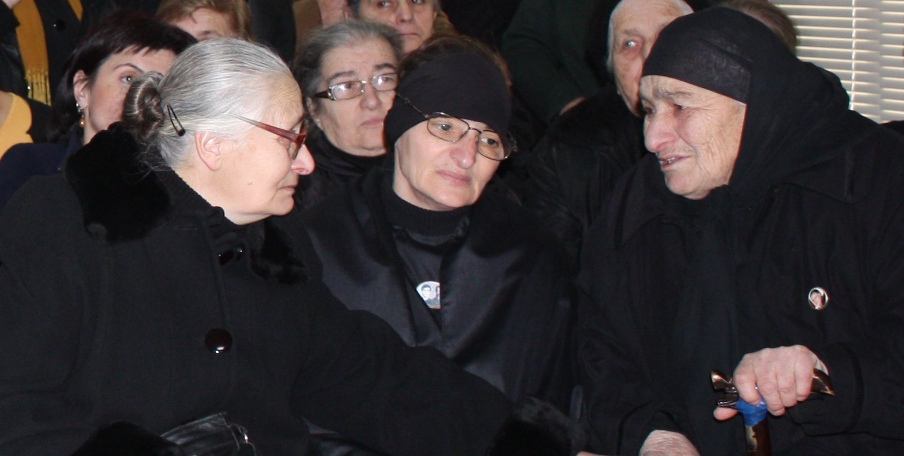
Georgian mothers whose sons hadn't returned since the 2008 Russo-Georgian War.

A primary human rights concern is the "documentation gap" affecting ethnic Georgians. Since 2014, when the de facto authorities invalidated thousands of Abkhazian passports held by Gali residents, many have been left without legal status. Residents are frequently required to apply for residency permits as "foreigners," a status that many residents reject as it classifies them as aliens in their ancestral homes. These residency permits do not grant the holders the right to vote in de facto elections or to officially own or inherit property. Human rights monitors emphasize that property rights are frequently ignored in practice, even when Georgian returnees hold favorable court rulings.

=== Security and movement ===
Personal security is a persistent concern due to mutual distrust between the local population and Abkhaz security forces. The 2016 murder of Giga Otkhozoria by Abkhaz border guards highlighted the precarious safety of residents who remain subject to police misconduct.

Crossing points along the Inguri River have been severely restricted since the 2008 war. Russian "borderization" of the administrative boundary lines continues to restrict movement, separating residents from their communities and livelihoods. The closure of the Nabakevi and Otobaia crossing points in 2017 significantly increased humanitarian pressure, complicating access to healthcare and education for residents.

=== Educational rights ===
The transition from Georgian to Russian-language instruction in Gali district schools is a major point of contention. Although ethnic Georgians comprise the vast majority of the student body, the curricula have been shifted toward Russian-language instruction, which observers argue undermines the quality of education and the maintenance of Georgian cultural identity.

In 2022, de facto authorities continued to restrict the ability of ethnic Georgians to receive an education in their native language across the district.

== Personal freedoms and social issues ==
The territory lacks robust legal protections against discrimination for LGBT+ people, and "nontraditional" sexual orientations face significant societal disapproval.

In terms of social legislation, a 2016 law bans abortion in all circumstances, including cases of rape, incest, or maternal health risks, allowing the procedure only in the event of prior fetal death. This ban has been identified by human rights experts as a significant rollback of women's reproductive rights and has led to concerns regarding the health risks associated with clandestine procedures. Additionally, in June 2023, the parliament amended the administrative code to impose fines for wearing swimsuits or appearing with a bare torso in public spaces outside of designated swimming areas.

== See also ==
- LGBT rights in Abkhazia
- Human rights in Georgia (country)
