= Sikhism in Georgia (country) =

Sikhism in Georgia სიქიზმი საქართველოში

Total population
- 200

Regions with significant populations
- Tbilisi

Religions
- Sikhism

Languages
- Georgian; Punjabi; Hindi; Urdu

Sikhs in Georgia are a religious minority in Georgia. There is estimated to be 200 Sikhs living in the country.

== History ==
Since the early 2000s, Sikh farmers from Punjab, India have been moving to Georgia due to the availability of fertile farmland and its affordability. Additionally, the Government of Georgia had made it easier for immigration from those with a farming background as the country had not utilized its agricultural resources.

Many Punjabi farmers believed that Georgia would soon be a part of European Union therefore making it easier for them to migrate to Canada and the US.

== Demographics ==
There is currently no official census of Sikhs in Georgia but at its peak there were estimated to be close to 1,800-3,000 Sikhs living there. However, since backlash from locals, immigration rules have become stricter with permanent residency and visitation. A large number of Sikh farmers left Georgia as a result of this.

- In 2012, it was reported there were 100 Sikhs in Tbilisi and 45 Sikhs living in Tsnori. The remainder living in other small communities across the country in Gardabani, Gurjaani, Rustavi and Mingrelia region.
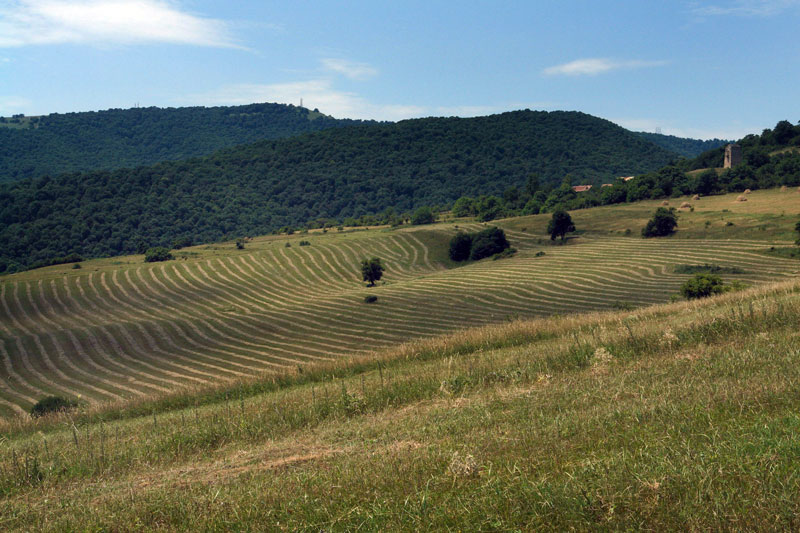
  The Algeti Valley, Georgia is a one area where Sikh farmers are working.

=== Language ===
Some of the Sikh farmers have learnt the Kartuli dialect of the Georgian language, which is known to be extremely hard to master.

== Gurdwara ==
In 2013, a Sikh businessman donated 2 acres of land for a Sikh Gurdwara in Tbilisi.

- Rustavi Sikh Gurdwara
- Tbilisi Sikh Gurdwara
