= Denis Chachkhalia =

Abkhazian writer, historian, and translator

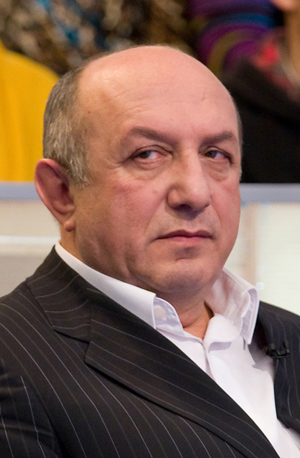
Chachkhalia in c. 2009

Denis Kirshalovich Chachkhalia (Abkhaz: Денис Кьыршьал-ипа Чачхалиа; Russian: Денис Киршалович Чачхалиа; born 21 August 1950) is an Abkhaz writer, historian, and translator.

Chachkhalia was born in the family of Abkhaz poet Kirshal Chachkhalia in Tkvarcheli. In 1973 he graduated from the Literary Institute at the Writer’s Union of the USSR in Moscow. He was working as a correspondent in the newspaper "Soviet Abkhazia", literary consultant of the writers union of Abkhazia. In the 1970s he published his collected poems: "Behind the Horizon Line", "Two Heavens", and "Relationship Extent". In the beginning of the 1980s, his work was included in the collected stories and drama "The Lonely Alder's Ford". Several stories were published in foreign languages. There are translations of Russian (Alexander Pushkin, Sergei Yesenin, Alexander Blok, Anna Akhmatova, Marina Tsvetaeva) and German (Heine, Goethe, Schiller) poetry into Abkhazian. The poems of Abkhaz poets Dmitry Gulia, Iyua Kogonia, Bagrat Shinkuba, Kirshal Chachkhalia, Anatoly Adzhindzhal, Taif Adzhba, Gennady Alamia, Rushbey Smir, translated into Russian, were published in Moscow, Leningrad, Sukhumi. From 1984 to 1989, he lectured at the Literary Institute in Moscow, leading the seminar on translation of Abkhaz poetry and prose. Then he established and headed Literary fond of writers union of Republic of Abkhazia in Sukhumi.

Chachkhalia later served as vice-chairman of the board of the Writers Union of Republic of Abkhazia for foreign affairs. Since the 1990s he lived and worked in Moscow, where he published the books "Abkhaz Orthodox Church. Chronicle. Additions" and "Chronicle of Abkhaz Tsars". He also edited several books, including: Karla Serena "Traveling along Abkhazia" (1997), F. Bodenshtedt "Along major and minor Abkhazia. About Cherkessia" (2002).

== Sources ==
- "The Adyghe (Cherkess) Encyclopedia". M., 2006.
