= List of diplomatic missions in Abkhazia =

Map of diplomatic missions in Abkhazia Abkhazia States with embassy in Abkhazia States with representative office in Abkhazia States with non-resident embassy to Abkhazia

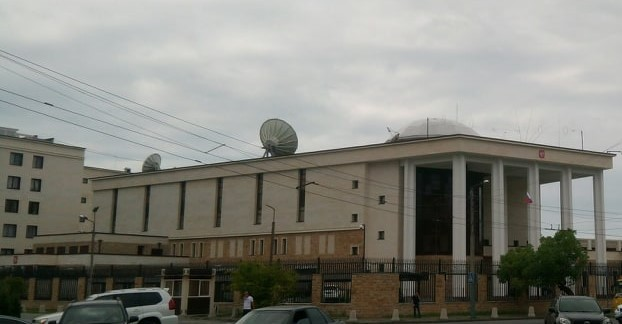
Russian Embassy in Sukhumi

This article lists the diplomatic missions in Abkhazia. Abkhazia broke away from Georgia after a war that lasted from August 1992 to September 1993. After the 2008 South Ossetia war Abkhazia was further recognised by Russia, Nicaragua, Venezuela, Nauru, Donetsk People's Republic (Note: Annexed by Russia on 30 September 2022.), Luhansk People's Republic, and Syria. Of these, South Ossetia and Russia have established embassies in Abkhazia, both in the capital, Sukhumi. Venezuelan and Nicaraguan ambassadors reside in Moscow.

== Embassies ==
Sukhumi

- Russia (Accredited and established since 16 December 2008. The old Embassy was opened on 1 February 2009 and began to work on 30 April 2009. The new Embassy established on 19 December 2010. This Embassy was formally inaugurated and opened on 18 April 2017.)
- South Ossetia (Accredited and established on 26 September 2007. The Embassy was formally opened on 15 April 2008.)

== Other posts ==
- Transnistria – Representative Office was established on 26 December 2006. The office was formally opened on 18 January 2007.
- Nicaragua – Nicaragua has an honorary consul in Abkhazia.

== Non-resident embassies ==
Moscow

- Venezuela
- Nicaragua

== See also ==
- Foreign relations of Abkhazia
- List of diplomatic missions of Abkhazia
