= Law enforcement in Abkhazia =

Law enforcement in Abkhazia is now de jure the responsibility of the International Police and the United Nations as the international organizations such as United Nations (32 Security Council Resolutions), EC, Organization for Security and Co-operation in Europe (OSCE), NATO, World Trade Organization, Council of the European Union, Commonwealth of Independent States, and most sovereign states do not recognize Abkhazia as an independent state. As a result, Abkhazia is de facto independent but remains a de jure part of Georgia, with internal security somewhat precarious. It has its own law enforcement organizations such as militia (police) that is subject to the Ministry of the Internal Affairs of the de facto government.

== International role in security ==
The UN has played various roles during the conflict and peace process: a military role through its observer mission (UNOMIG); dual diplomatic roles through the Security Council and the appointment of a Special Envoy, succeeded by a Special Representative to the Secretary-General; a humanitarian role (UNHCR and UNOCHA); a development role (UNDP); a human rights role (UNCHR); and a low-key capacity and confidence-building role (UNV). The UN’s position has been that there will be no forcible change in international borders. Any settlement must be freely negotiated and based on autonomy for Abkhazia legitimized by referendum under international observation once the multi-ethnic population has returned. OSCE expressed concern and condemnation over ethnic cleansing of Georgians in Abkhazia during the 1994 Budapest Summit Decision and later at the Lisbon Summit Declaration in 1996. The OSCE] has increasingly engaged in dialogue with officials and civil society representatives in Abkhazia, especially from NGOs and the media, regarding human dimension standards and is considering a presence in Gali.

== Existing government organizations ==
Abkhazian militia also enforce Abkhaz law. Georgia regards the Abkhaz militia as an unlawful formation. Agencies attempts to enforce security or law on behalf of the Abkhazian government is met with opposition, sometimes force, from Georgian forces. Such was the case on July 26, 2006 when Georgian police announced that they had engaged "criminal gangs", Abkhazian militia, on the de facto border.

== Crime ==
On 20 June 2014, acting Minister of Internal Affairs Raul Lolua reported that Abkhazia had ten thieves in law, nine of which ethnic Abkhaz and one Georgian, and that the police had recently thwarted the initiation of one more.

== See also ==
- Military of Abkhazia
