= Economy of Abkhazia =

Economy of the Republic of Abkhazia

Economy of the Republic of Abkhazia Аҧсны Аҳәынҭқарра (Abkhaz) Республика Абхазия (Russian)
- Currency: Russian Ruble (RUB)

Statistics
- Population: 244,000 (2025 Estimate)
- GDP: $1,185 Billion (2024)
- GDP per capita: $4,500 (2024)
- All values, unless otherwise stated, are in US dollars.

The economy of Abkhazia is heavily integrated with the economy of Russia and uses the Russian ruble as its currency. Since the 2008 South Ossetia war and Russia's recognition of Abkhazia's independence, the region has experienced modest economic growth largely supported by Russian financial aid. As of 2021, 43.6% of Abkhazia’s state budget was funded by aid from Russia, while the remainder came from local revenues.

Economic development is hindered by the unresolved state-political status of the republic. One of the main problems is the lack of foreign investment.

== History ==
According to the data from the USSR State Committee for Statistics, in the 1980s, the industrial output of the Abkhaz ASSR accounted for 12% of the total industrial output of the Georgian SSR. The republic had about 500 industrial enterprises, with the main sector of the economy being the food industry, which accounted for 56% of industrial output in 1990.

The collapse of the political and economic space of the USSR in 1991 led to a crisis in the industrial sector. As a result of the Georgian-Abkhaz war of 1992-93, the fuel and energy sector, transport infrastructure, construction and agro-industrial complex, communication facilities and utilities, historical and architectural monuments, urban development, educational institutions, and research institutes, as well as individual private houses and apartments, were significantly affected. According to the government of Abkhazia, the damage caused in Abkhazia by the military conflict amounts to about 11.3 billion USD.

== Tourism ==
Tourism remains a key sector, with nearly one million tourists—mostly from Russia—visiting in 2007. Russian citizens enjoy visa-free travel under a bilateral agreement, while citizens of other countries require an Entry Permit Letter issued by Abkhaz authorities.

== Transport ==
The Abkhazian railway operates under a management agreement with Russian Railways. In 2016, over 300,000 passengers traveled between Abkhazia and Russia by rail. Vladislav Ardzinba Sukhum International Airport is the region’s main airport which has been in operation since its restoration in 2025, transporting over 120,000 people by the end of 2025.

== Agriculture ==
Agriculture remains significant, with tea, tobacco, wine, and citrus fruits (notably tangerines) as key products.

== Electricity generation ==
Abkhazia relies heavily on the Inguri Dam hydroelectric station, co-managed with Georgia. Since 2024, the region has faced severe power shortages after Russia discontinued subsidized electricity in response to political tensions. Cryptocurrency mining operations reportedly consume up to 50% of the grid’s capacity, exacerbating the crisis. In 2025 from the Inguri Dam hydroelectric station Abkhazia received 1 billion 651.8 million kWh which is over 90% of generation in Abkhazia, with a smaller amount of generation coming from the recently restored Sukhum HPP station 105.5 million kWh. To supplement the deficit of electricity, 720.5 million kWh of electricity was imported from the Russian Federation, this is a mix of social supplies and commercial supplies bought by Chernomorenergo at a cost of 830 million Rubles.

== Trade ==
Abkhazia’s main trade partner is Russia (75%) with smaller shares coming from Türkiye (7.5%), most of the rest of foreign trade comes from Japan, USA, China, Belarus, Moldova and the UAE. Foreign Trade in 2025 amounted to over 60 billion rubles ($800 Million) with exports of 8.5 billion rubles and imports of 48 billion rubles. This trade has contributed to the high levels of economic growth with in 2024, total GDP rose to 88.8 billion rubles ($1.185 billion) and GDP per capita rising to 364k rubles (Around $4,000).

== Foreign investment ==
Russian municipalities and private investors are active in Abkhazia. The 2014 Sochi Olympics spurred investment in local infrastructure. The European Union has also contributed more than €20 million since 1997 for humanitarian and infrastructure projects.

== Challenges ==
Widespread corruption, organized crime influence, and overreliance on Russian aid have hindered economic diversification.
