= Extreme points of Georgia (country) =

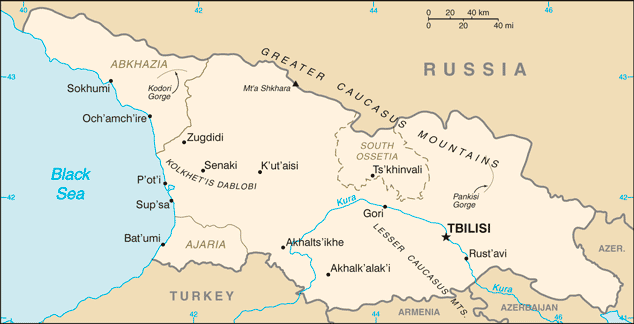

This is a list of the extreme points of Georgia: the points that are farther north, south, east or west than any other location, as well as the highest and lowest points in the country.

== Extreme coordinates ==
Heading	Location	District	Bordering entity	Coordinates	Notes
North extreme	Aibga	Gagra District	Russia	43°35′10″N 40°11′55″E	
South extreme	Border with Azerbaijan	Dedoplistsqaro Municipality	Samukh District (Azerbaijan)	41°03′18″N 46°29′38″E	
West extreme	Psou	Gagra District	Russia	43°25′24″N 40°00′38″E	
East extreme	Kakheti, border with Azerbaijan	Dedoplistsqaro Municipality	Qakh District (Azerbaijan)	41°17′06″N 46°44′09″E	

== Elevation extremes ==
- Highest point: Shkhara at 5,201 m
- Lowest point: Black Sea at 0 m

The CIA World Factbook (2024) gives Mt'a Shkara as the highest point but at 5,193 m.

== See also ==
- Extreme points of Europe
- Extreme points of Earth
- Geography of Georgia (country)
