= Districts of Abkhazia =

Region of Georgia

- Districts of Abkhazia
- Category: First-level subdivisions
- Location: Abkhazia (Note: The political status of Abkhazia is disputed. Having unilaterally declared independence from Georgia in 1992, Abkhazia is formally recognised as an independent state by 5 UN member states (two other states previously recognised it but then withdrew their recognition), while the remainder of the international community recognizes it as de jure Georgian territory. Georgia continues to claim the area as its own territory, designating it as Russian-occupied territory.)/ Georgia
- Created: 1923 as part of the Soviet Administrative Reform
- Number: 7

The Districts of Abkhazia are the first-level subdivisions of Abkhazia. (Note: The political status of Abkhazia is disputed. Having unilaterally declared independence from Georgia in 1992, Abkhazia is formally recognised as an independent state by 5 UN member states (two other states previously recognised it but then withdrew their recognition), while the remainder of the international community recognizes it as de jure Georgian territory. Georgia continues to claim the area as its own territory, designating it as Russian-occupied territory.)

Districts are led by the Head of the Administration, who is simultaneously Mayor of the District's capital, except in the case of Sukhumi. The Head of the Administration is appointed by the President following consultations with the District Assembly. Previously, the Head was appointed from among the District Assembly members, but without consultations, but in practice the President would often appoint an acting Head from without who was subsequently elected to the assembly. The current procedure was adopted by the People's Assembly of Abkhazia on 29 January 2016, over competing proposals to elect the Head directly by the District's population or by Assembly members, and after voting almost unanimously not to change the previous procedure on 30 July 2015.

== List ==
- (1) Gagra
- (2) Gudauta
- (3) Sukhumi
- (4) Gulripshi
- (5) Ochamchira
- (6) Tkvarcheli
- (7) Gali
