= List of diplomatic missions of Abkhazia =

Map of diplomatic missions of Abkhazia Abkhazia Abkhaz embassy Abkhaz representative office

This article lists the diplomatic missions of Abkhazia. The Republic of Abkhazia is a state with limited recognition, which declared independence from Georgia in 1992, but did not receive recognition from any UN member states after the 2008 South Ossetia war. Abkhazia is recognized by Russia, Nicaragua, Venezuela, Nauru and Syria. In addition, it is recognized also by South Ossetia and Transnistria, which are both not members of the United Nations. Until 2020, Abkhazia has five embassies abroad and small network of representative offices in near countries.

Abkhazia also has four honorary consulates, based in Beijing (China), Nizhny Novgorod (Russia), Rostov-on-Don (Russia) and London (United Kingdom). (Note: the Honorary consul in United Kingdom since 1993 is Professor George Hewitt.)

== Africa ==
- Tunisia
  - Tunis (Representative office)

== Americas ==
- Nicaragua
  - Managua (Embassy)
- Venezuela
  - Caracas (Embassy) (Note: Until 2021, the embassy in Venezuela was also accredited to Nicaragua.)

== Asia ==
- Jordan
  - Amman (Representative office)
- South Ossetia
  - Tskhinvali (Embassy)
- Syria
  - Damascus (Embassy)
- Turkey
  - Istanbul (Representative office)

== Europe ==
- Austria
  - (Representative office)
- Bulgaria
  - (Representative office)
- Germany
  - (Representative office)

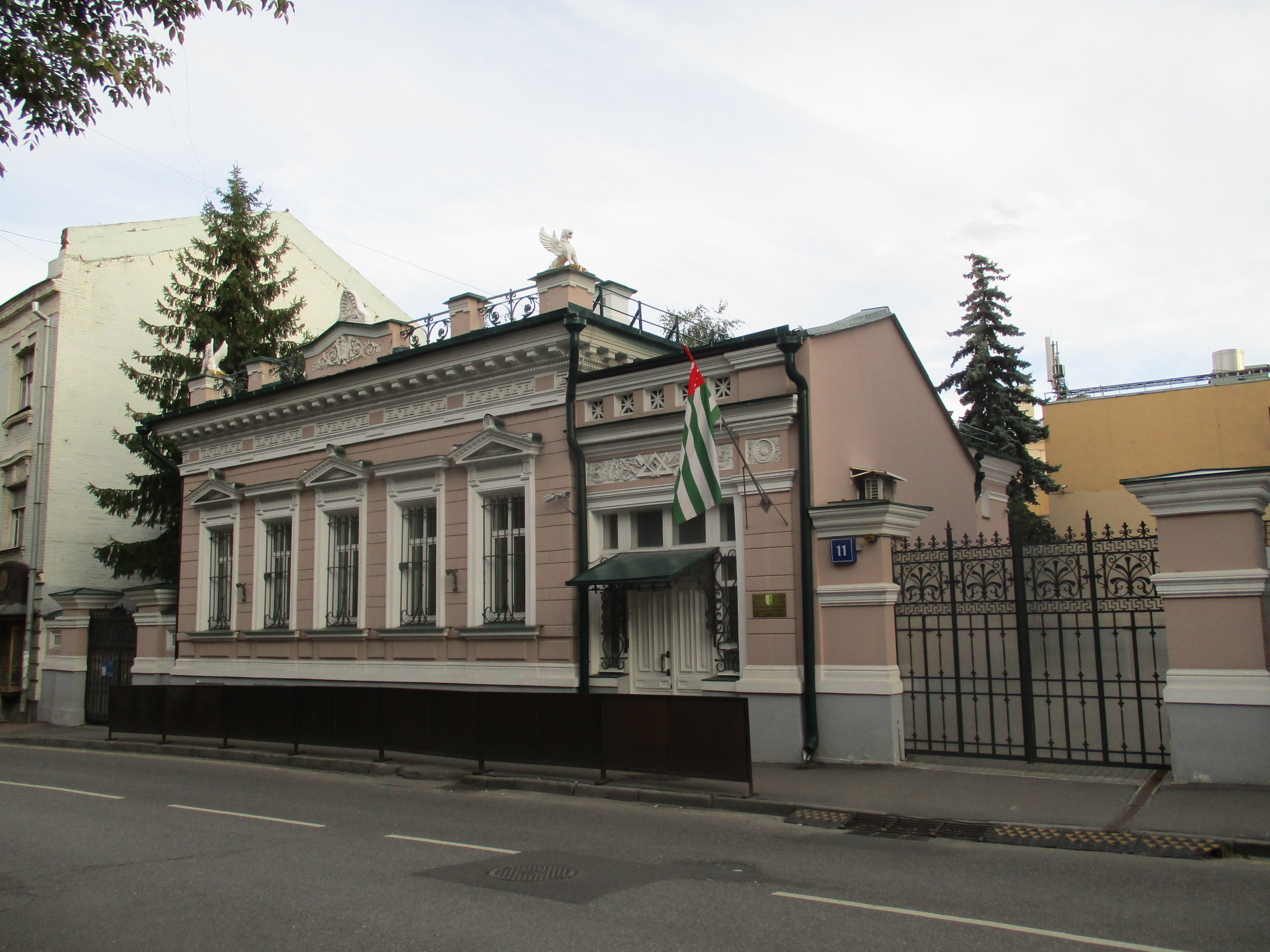
Abkhaz embassy in Moscow, Russia

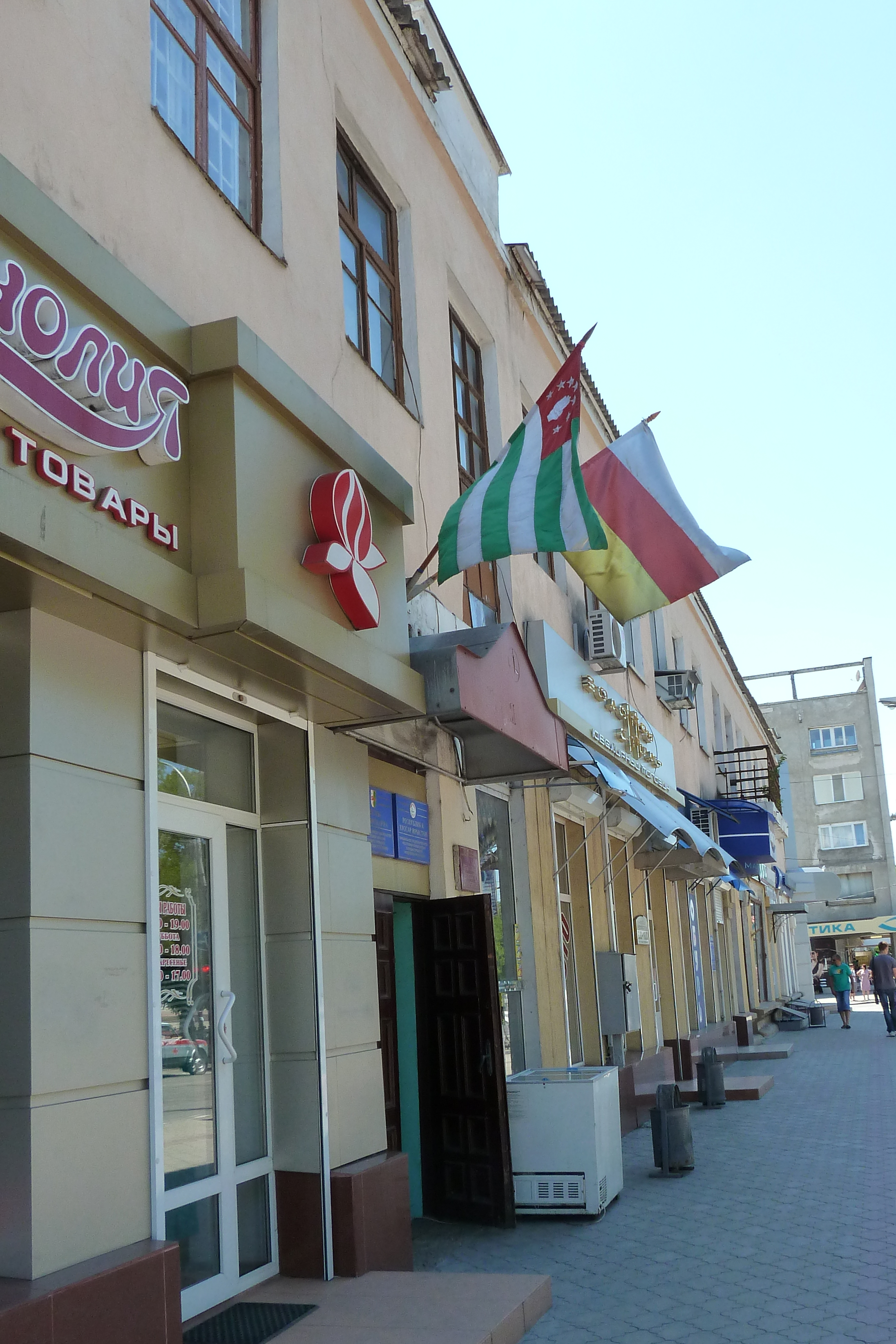
Abkhaz representative office in Tiraspol, Transnistria

- Greece
  - Athens (Representative office)
- Italy
  - Rome (Representative office)
- Russia
  - Moscow (Embassy)
- Transnistria
  - Tiraspol (Representative office)

== See also ==
- Foreign relations of Abkhazia
- List of diplomatic missions in Abkhazia
