= National Bank of the Republic of Abkhazia =

Central Bank of Abkhazia

National Bank of the Republic of Abkhazia Аԥсны Аҳәынҭқарра Амилаҭтә Банк (in Abkhaz) Национальный банк Республики Абхазия (in Russian)
- Official logo

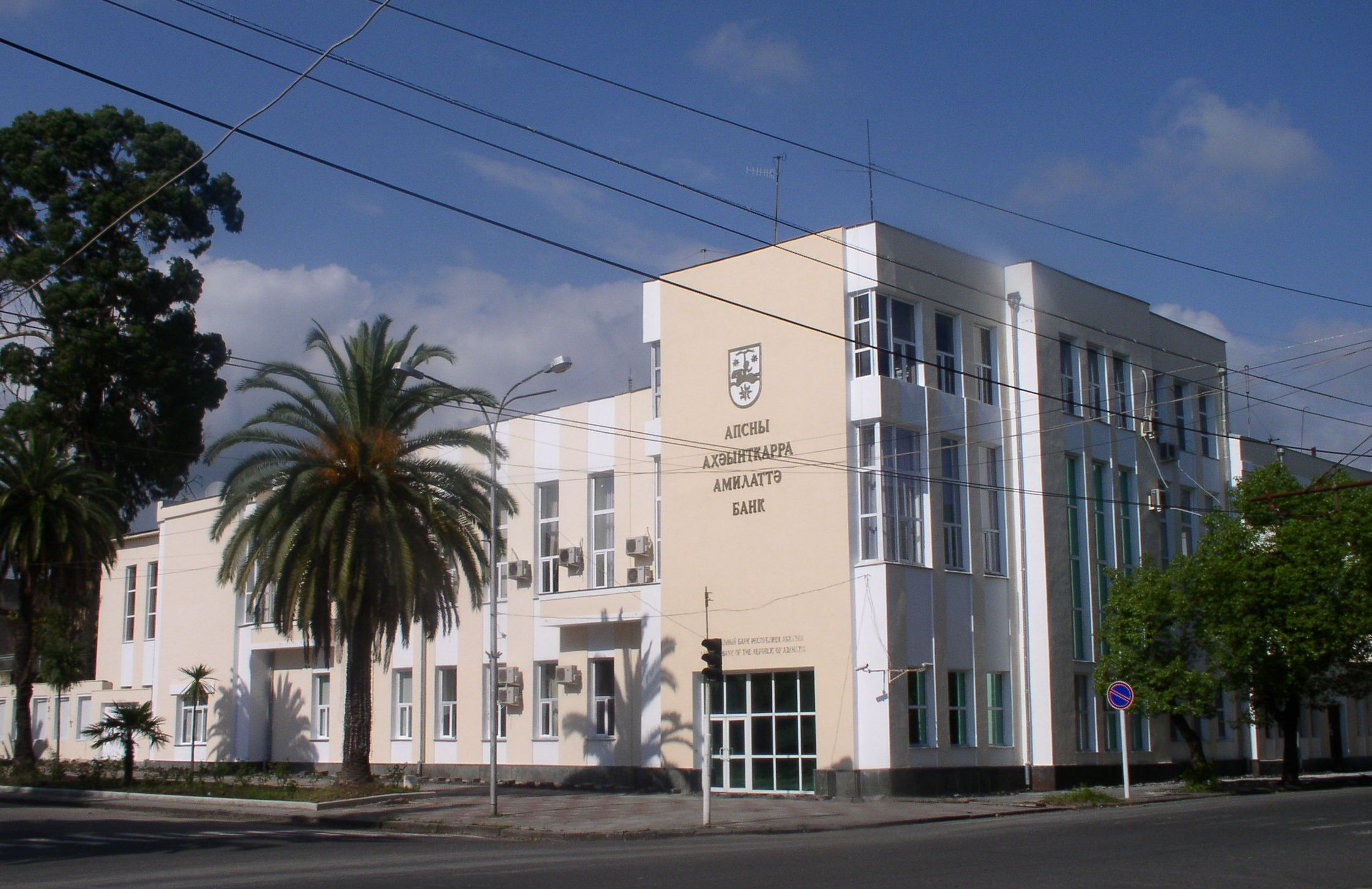
- Front view of the main office on Leon Street
- Central bank of: Abkhazia
- Headquarters: 384900, Leon Street 14, Sukhumi
- Established: February 28, 1991
- Chairman: Beslan Baratelia (since 2014)
- Currency: Russian ruble, Abkhazian Apsar; RUB (ISO 4217)
- Website: nb-ra.org/en/

The National Bank of the Republic of Abkhazia (Abkhaz: Аԥсны Аҳәынҭқарра Амилаҭтә Банк, Russian: Национальный банк Республики Абхазия), also known by the short form of Bank of Abkhazia (Russian: Банк Абхазии), is the central bank of the disputed region and partly recognized state of Abkhazia on the eastern coast of the Black Sea. It was established on February 28, 1991 since the adoption of the laws "On the National Bank of the Abkhaz SSR" and "On Banks and Banking of the Abkhaz SSR" passed by the Supreme Soviet of the Abkhaz SSR on February 28, 1991.

The Bank's headquarters are located in a constructivist building on Leon Street in Sukhumi, Abkhazia's capital.

== Primary actions of the Bank ==
Due to the use of the Russian ruble in Abkhazia, the National Bank of Abkhazia exercises little control over the money supply in Abkhazia’s economy and has almost no influence on the value of the Russian currency. Its actions are primarily focused on registering commercial banks and making wholesale loans to them.

== Declared functions of the Bank ==
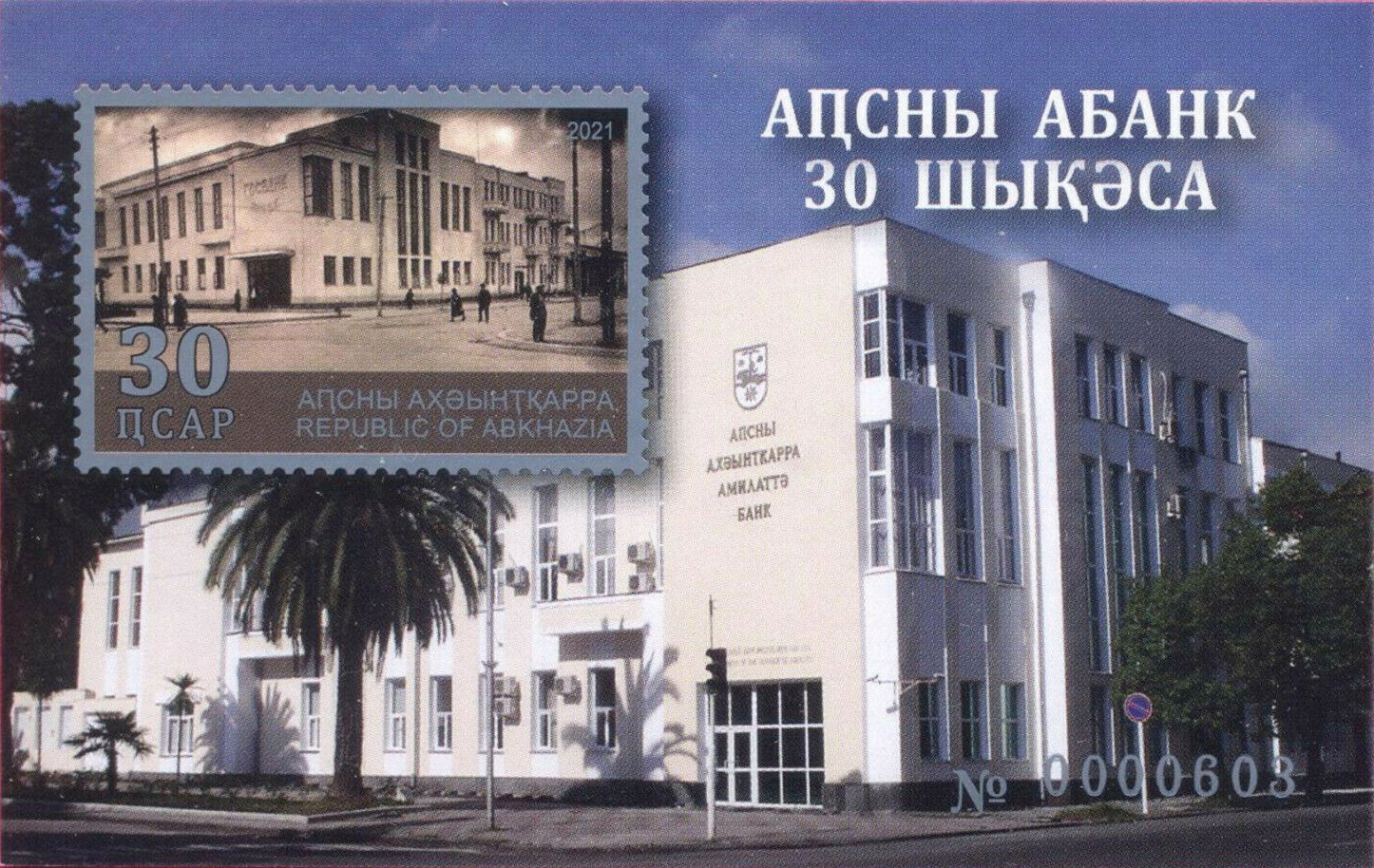
2021 Abkhazian post card commemorating the 30th anniversary of the bank

- To develop and conduct, in cooperation with the Government of the Republic of Abkhazia, the state's monetary policy.
- To implement emissions of cash and arrange for their treatment.
- As creditor of last resort for credit institutions and organize a system of refinancing.
- To establish rules of settlement in the Republic of Abkhazia.
- To establish rules for banking, accounting and reporting for the banking system.
- To implement state registration of credit organisations.
- To grant and revoke licenses of credit institutions and organisations involved in their audit.
- To supervise and monitor the activities of credit organisations.
- To register and issue securities to lending organisations, in accordance with the law.
- To exercise, alone or at the invitation of the Government of the Republic of Abkhazia, varied banking operations needed to meet the major challenges of the Bank of Abkhazia.
- To implement currency regulation, including operations on the buying and selling of foreign currency, by determining the order of settlement with foreign countries.
- To organise and implement exchange controls, in accordance with the laws of the Republic of Abkhazia.
- To organise and carry out measures to prevent the legalization (laundering) of proceeds from crime and terrorism financing.
- To participate in the development of the balance of payments forecast of the Republic of Abkhazia, and organize the balance of payments by the Republic of Abkhazia.
- To conduct, analyze and forecast the economy of the Republic of Abkhazia, especially in the monetary and financial fields, and publish relevant material and statistical data.

== Chairman of the National Bank ==
On 10 November 2004, during the height of the post-election crisis, President Ardzinba dismissed Boris Zhirov as chairman of the National Bank and temporarily appointed Vice-Premier Emma Tania in his stead. After Sergei Bagapsh won the January 2005 rerun, the People's Assembly voted to permanently appoint a chairman. It first voted against the permanent appointment of Tania, before supporting on 10 June the nomination of Illarion Argun, former chairman of Gagra Bank, with 29 votes in favour, 3 against and 3 abstentions.

On 1 August, Argun along with Jeiran Kirval, the National Bank's chief security officer, died in a car crash on the coastal highway near Upper Eshera.

On 26 December, President Raul Khajimba nominated head of the Economical Department of the Presidential Administration Beslan Baratelia as the new chairman. On 29 December, Parliament elected him with 28 votes in favour and 1 against (out of 35).

#	Name	From	Until	President	Comments
	Daur Barganjia	1996	1998	Vladislav Ardzinba	
	Boris Zhirov		10 November 2004	Vladislav Ardzinba	
	Emma Tania	10 November 2004	10 June 2005	Vladislav Ardzinba	Acting
	Illarion Argun	10 June 2005	29 May 2011	Sergei Bagapsh	
	Illarion Argun	29 May 2011	1 June 2014	Alexander Ankvab	
	Illarion Argun	1 June 2014	1 August 2014	Valeri Bganba	Died in office
	Beslan Baratelia	29 December 2014	present	Raul Khajimba	

== See also ==
- Russian ruble
- List of central banks
