= List of cities and towns in Georgia (country) =

Cities and towns in Georgia

Cities and towns in Georgia by population size

The following list of Georgian cities is divided into three lists for Georgia itself, and the disputed territories of Abkhazia and South Ossetia. Although not recognized by most countries, Abkhazia and South Ossetia have been partially de facto independent since, respectively, 1992 and 1991 and occupied by Russia since 2008 Russo-Georgian War.

== Cities and towns controlled by Georgian Government ==
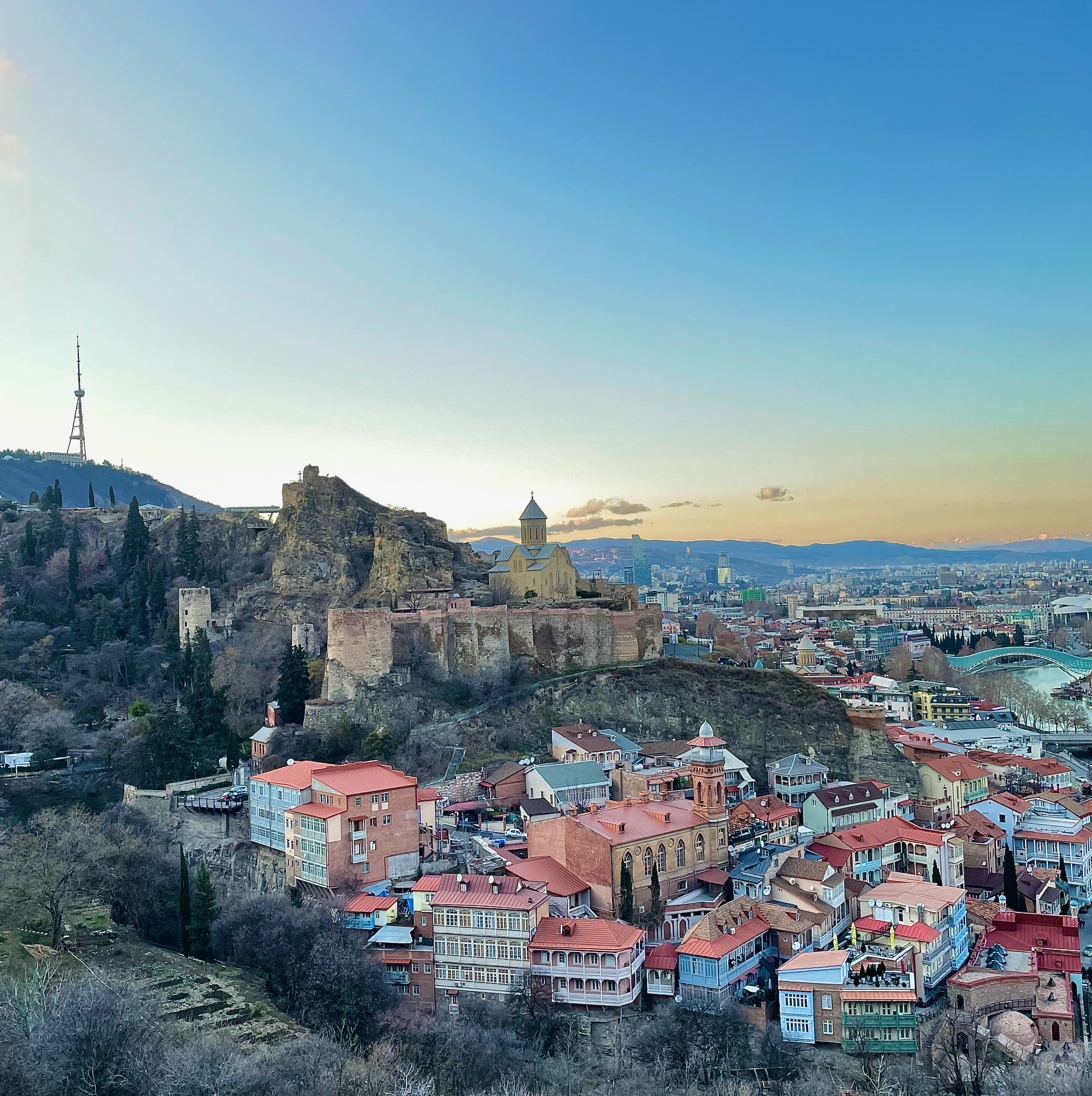
Old Town of Tbilisi, capital and largest city in Georgia

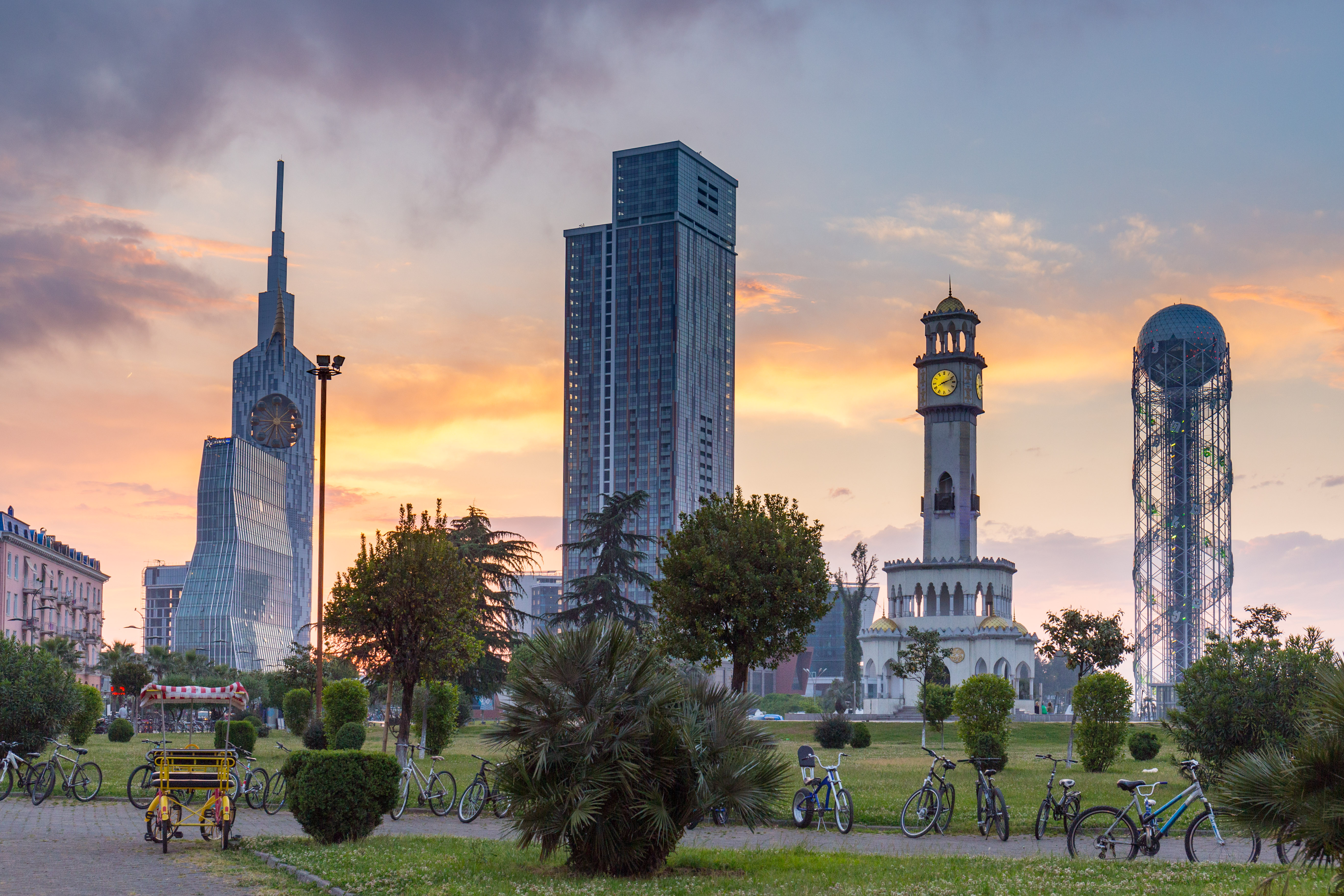
Batumi, the second largest city in Georgia

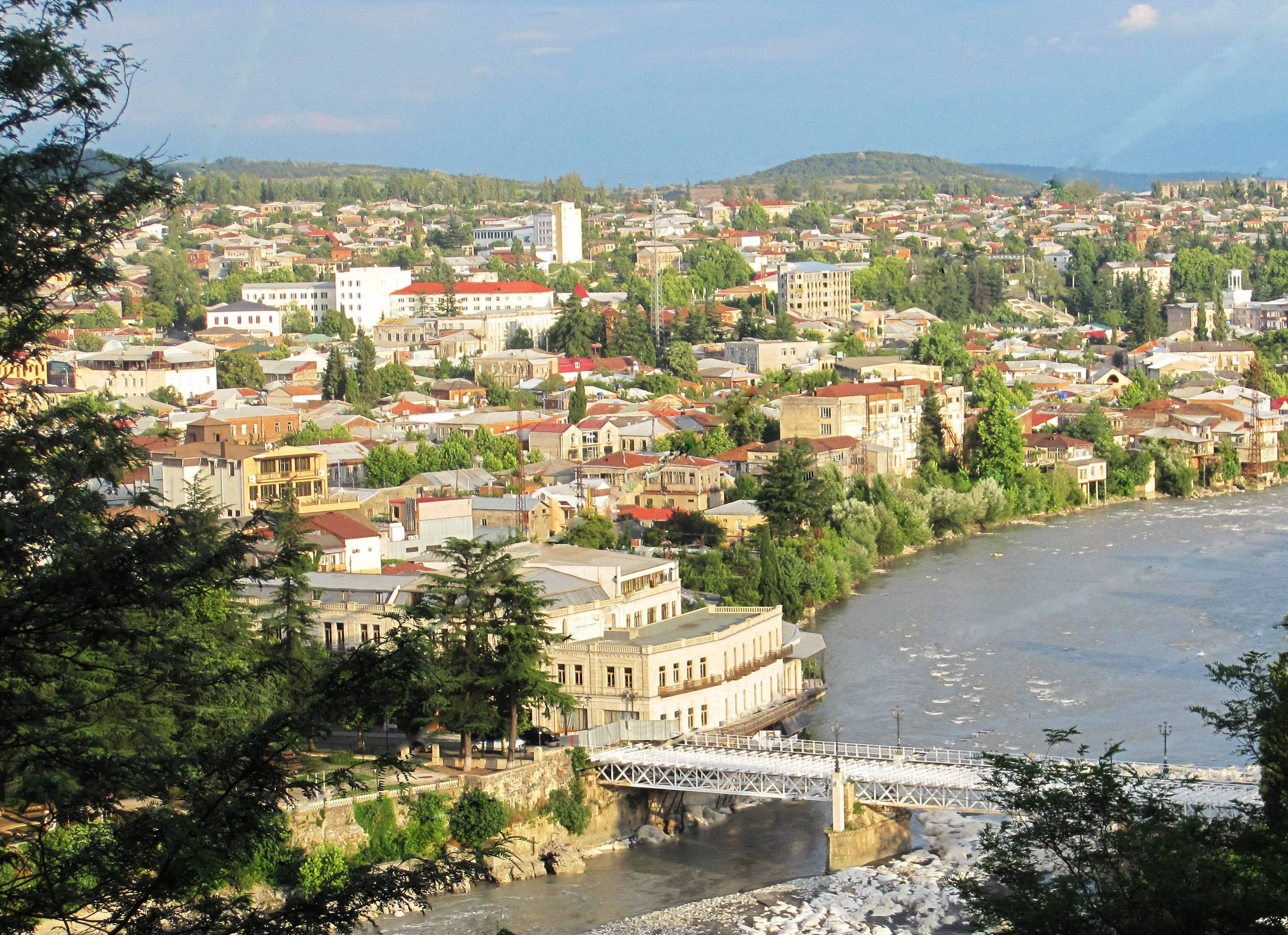
Kutaisi, Georgia's third largest city.

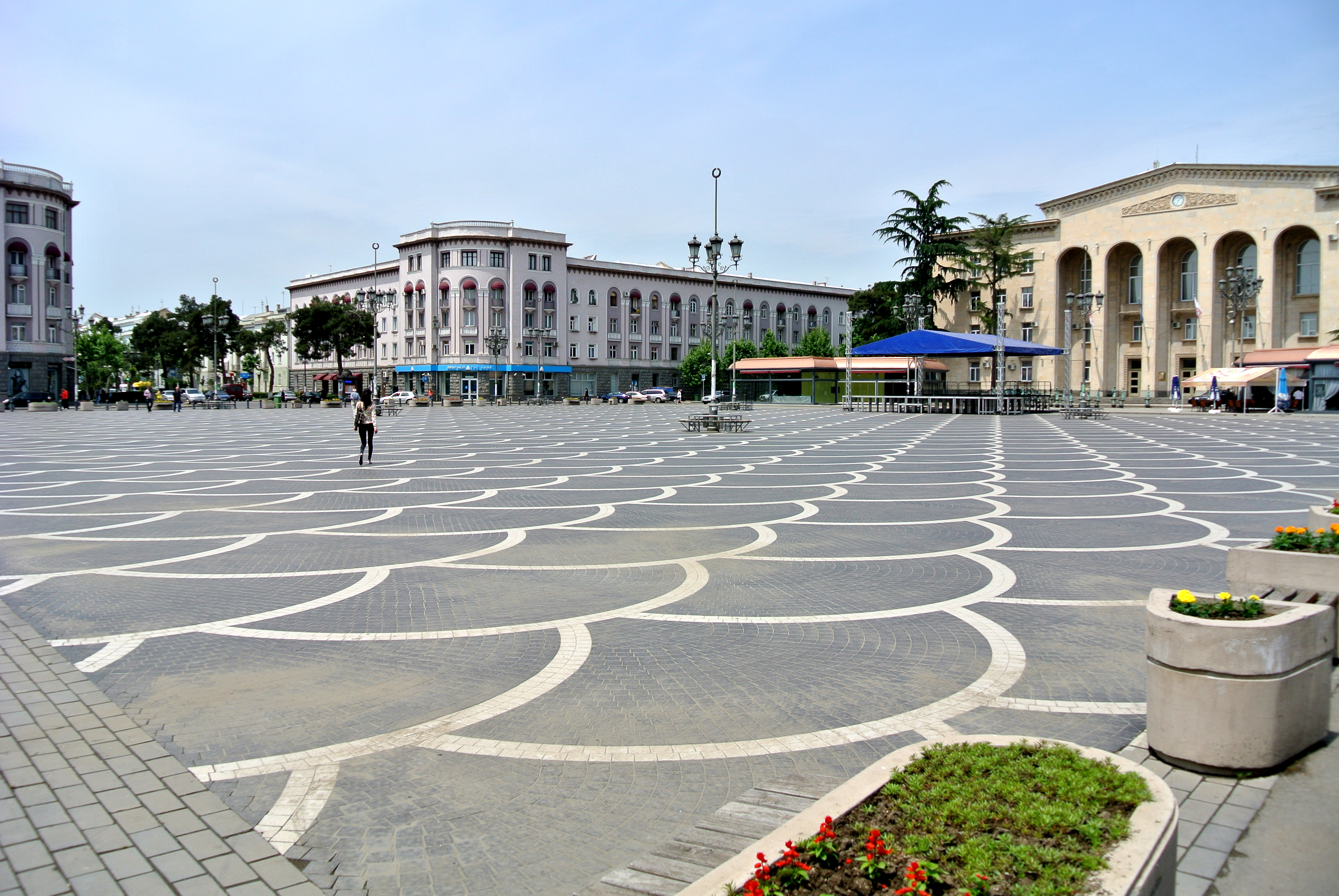
Square in Rustavi, Georgia's fourth largest city.

This is a list of the cities and towns (Georgian: ქალაქი, k'alak'i) in Georgia, according to the 2014 census data and the population by cities and boroughs data of the National Statistics Office of Georgia. The list does not include the smaller urban-type settlements categorized in Georgia as daba (დაბა). The list also does not include cities and towns in the disputed territories of Abkhazia and South Ossetia.

Rank	Name	Name in Georgian	Population 1989	Population 2002	Population 2014	Population 2024	Administrative Region
1.	Tbilisi	თბილისი	1,243,200	1,073,300	1,108,717	1,258,500	Tbilisi (capital region)
2.	Batumi	ბათუმი	136,900	121,800	152,839	234,950	Adjara
3.	Rustavi	რუსთავი	159,000	116,400	125,103	127,200	Kvemo Kartli
4.	Kutaisi	ქუთაისი	232,500	186,000	147,635	160,971	Imereti
5.	Gori	გორი	67,800	49,500	48,143	42,600	Shida Kartli
6.	Poti	ფოთი	50,600	47,100	41,465	41,200	Samegrelo-Zemo Svaneti
7.	Zugdidi	ზუგდიდი	49,600	68,900	42,998	40,100	Samegrelo-Zemo Svaneti
8.	Khashuri	ხაშური	31,700	28,600	26,135	31,200	Shida Kartli
9.	Kobuleti	ქობულეთი	20,600	18,600	27,546	28,100	Adjara
10.	Marneuli	მარნეული	27,100	20,100	20,211	25,700	Kvemo Kartli
11.	Samtredia	სამტრედია	34,300	29,800	25,318	22,100	Imereti
12.	Zestaponi	ზესტაფონი	25,900	24,200	20,814	20,200	Imereti
13.	Telavi	თელავი	27,800	21,800	19,629	19,700	Kakheti
14.	Akhaltsikhe	ახალციხე	24,700	18,500	18,903	17,300	Samtskhe-Javakheti
15.	Senaki	სენაკი	28,900	28,100	21,596	15,700	Samegrelo-Zemo Svaneti
16.	Ozurgeti	ოზურგეთი	23,300	18,700	14,785	14,000	Guria
17.	Kaspi	კასპი	17,100	15,200	13,423	12,400	Shida Kartli
18.	Gardabani	გარდაბანი	17,000	11,900	10,753	12,100	Kvemo Kartli
19.	Chiatura	ჭიათურა	28,900	13,800	12,803	12,000	Imereti
20.	Borjomi	ბორჯომი	17,800	14,400	10,546	11,200	Samtskhe-Javakheti
21.	Sagarejo	საგარეჯო	14,400	12,600	10,871	10,100	Kakheti
22.	Kvareli	ყვარელი	11,300	9,000	7,739	9,900	Kakheti
23.	Bolnisi	ბოლნისი	14,900	9,900	8,967	8,300	Kvemo Kartli
24.	Tkibuli	ტყიბული	22,000	14,500	9,770	8,100	Imereti
25.	Khoni	ხონი	14,300	11,300	8,987	7,800	Imereti
26.	Akhalkalaki	ახალქალაქი	15,200	9,800	8,295	7,500	Samtskhe-Javakheti
27.	Tskaltubo	წყალტუბო	17,400	16,800	11,281	7,400	Imereti
28.	Mtskheta	მცხეთა	8,900	7,700	7,940	7,400	Mtskheta-Mtianeti
29.	Gurjaani	გურჯაანი	12,600	10,000	8,024	7,300	Kakheti
30.	Dusheti	დუშეთი	8,500	7,300	6,167	7,200	Mtskheta-Mtianeti
31.	Kareli	ქარელი	8,300	7,200	6,654	6,800	Shida Kartli
32.	Lanchkhuti	ლანჩხუთი	9,000	7,900	6,395	6,200	Guria
33.	Akhmeta	ახმეტა	8,900	8,600	7,105	5,800	Kakheti
34.	Lagodekhi	ლაგოდეხი	9,000	6,900	5,918	5,600	Kakheti
35.	Dedoplistsqaro	დედოფლისწყარო	10,100	7,700	5,940	5,500	Kakheti
36.	Sachkhere	საჩხერე	7,800	6,700	6,140	5,300	Imereti
37.	Vale	ვალე	6,300	5,000	3,646	5,000	Samtskhe-Javakheti
38.	Tsnori	წნორი	2,900	6,100	4,815	4,800	Kakheti
39.	Terjola	თერჯოლა	6,300	5,500	4,644	4,800	Imereti
40.	Tetritsqaro	თეთრიწყარო	8,600	4,000	3,093	4,800	Kvemo Kartli
41.	Abasha	აბაშა	7,200	6,400	4,941	4,200	Samegrelo-Zemo Svaneti
42.	Ninotsminda	ნინოწმინდა	6,900	6,300	5,144	4,000	Samtskhe-Javakheti
43.	Martvili	მარტვილი	6,000	5,600	4,425	4,000	Samegrelo-Zemo Svaneti
44.	Tsalka	წალკა	8,000	1,700	2,874	3,700	Kvemo Kartli
45.	Vani	ვანი	6,400	4,600	3,744	3,200	Imereti
46.	Khobi	ხობი	6,600	5,600	4,242	3,100	Samegrelo-Zemo Svaneti
47.	Dmanisi	დმანისი	8,600	3,400	2,661	3,100	Kvemo Kartli
48.	Tsalenjikha	წალენჯიხა	9,300	9,000	6,388	3,000	Samegrelo-Zemo Svaneti
49.	Baghdati	ბაღდათი	5,500	4,700	3,707	2,500	Imereti
50.	Oni	ონი	5,500	3,300	2,656	2,500	Racha-Lechkhumi and Kvemo Svaneti
51.	Ambrolauri	ამბროლაური	2,900	2,500	2,047	2,000	Racha-Lechkhumi and Kvemo Svaneti
52.	Sighnaghi	სიღნაღი	3,100	2,100	1,485	1,400	Kakheti
53.	Jvari	ჯვარი	5,100	4,800	4,361	1,200	Samegrelo-Zemo Svaneti
54.	Tsageri	ცაგერი	1,400	2,000	1,320	1,000	Racha-Lechkhumi and Kvemo Svaneti

== Cities and towns in Abkhazia and South Ossetia/Tskhinvali Region ==
This is a list of the largest cities and towns in Abkhazia. Data for 1989 is official data from the Soviet Census 1989, data for 2010 are unofficial estimates of the World Gazetteer.

Rank	Name	Name in Georgian	Name in Abkhaz	Population 1989	Population 2010	Administrative Region
1.	Sokhumi	სოხუმი	Аҟәа	119,200	39,100	Sukhumi District
2.	Tkvarcheli	ტყვარჩელი	Тҟәарчал	21,700	16,800	Ochamchire District
3.	Ochamchire	ოჩამჩირე	Очамчыра	20,100	14,300	Ochamchire District
4.	Gali	გალი	Гал	15,800	10,800	Gali District
5.	Gudauta	გუდაუთა	Гәдоуҭа	14,900	10,800	Gudauta District
6.	Pitsunda	ბიჭვინთა	Пиҵунда	11,000	8,500	Gagra District
7.	Gulripshi	გულრიფში	Гәылрыҧшь	11,800	8,200	Gulripshi District
8.	Gagra	გაგრა	Гагра	24,000	7,700	Gagra District
9.	New Athos	ახალი ათონი	Афон Ҿыц	3,200	3,700	Gudauta District

This is a list of the largest cities and towns in South Ossetia/Tskhinvali Region. Data for 1989 is official data from the Soviet Census 1989, data for 2010 are unofficial estimates of the World Gazetteer.

Rank	Name	Name in Georgian	Name in Ossetian	Population 1989	Population 2010	Administrative Region
1.	Tskhinvali	ცხინვალი	Цхинвал	42,300	30,000	Gori District

== Future cities and towns ==
The intent to construct Lazika, a new city on Georgia's Black Sea littoral, was unveiled by President of Georgia Mikheil Saakashvili on December 4, 2011. The construction was scheduled to be launched in 2012.

== See also ==
- Administrative divisions of Georgia
- List of municipalities in Georgia
