= International recognition of Abkhazia and South Ossetia =

Abkhazia and South Ossetia States that recognize Abkhazia and South Ossetia States that have withdrawn recognition of Abkhazia and/or South Ossetia States that do not recognize Abkhazia and/or South Ossetia

Abkhazia and South Ossetia are two regions that broke away from Georgia amidst the dissolution of the Soviet Union in the early 1990s. South Ossetian separatists declared independence during the South Ossetia war from January 1991 to June 1992 and were followed by Abkhaz separatists during the Abkhazia war from August 1992 to September 1993. Both separatist movements received support from Russia, but their declarations of independence gained only limited international recognition.

The Georgian government eschews the choronym "South Ossetia" ("South" relative to Russia's North Ossetia—collectively Ossetia) and instead refers to it as the "Tskhinvali Region" within Shida Kartli, although the eponymous capital city Tskhinvali is not controlled by Georgia. In addition to Georgia, the majority of the international community regards Abkhazia and South Ossetia as Georgian territory under Russian occupation.

After the Russian invasion of Georgia in August 2008, Russia recognised Abkhazia and South Ossetia as independent sovereign states. Three United Nations members besides Russia recognise Abkhazia and South Ossetia: Nicaragua in September 2008; Venezuela in September 2009; and Syria in May 2018. Three other United Nations members formerly recognised the separatist regions' independence: Vanuatu granted recognition in May 2011, but rescinded in March 2019; Tuvalu granted recognition in September 2011, but rescinded in March 2014; Nauru granted recognition in December 2009, but rescinded in July 2026.

Beyond United Nations members, Abkhazia and South Ossetia recognise each other. They are also recognised by Transnistria, a state with limited or no international recognition. Three other former internationally unrecognised states had recognised Abkhazia and South Ossetia: the Republic of Artsakh (2006) within Azerbaijan; and the Donetsk People's Republic and the Luhansk People's Republic (both 2014/2022) within Ukraine. Excluding the former Republic of Artsakh, all of those states, current and former, are, like South Ossetia and Abkhazia, classified as Russian-occupied territories.

== History ==
South Ossetia declared independence from Georgia during the 1991–1992 South Ossetia War on 29 May 1992, with its Constitution referring to the "Republic of South Ossetia". Abkhazia declared its independence after its war with Georgia in 1992–1993. Its Constitution was adopted on 26 November 1994.

The 2008 South Ossetia war was fought in August 2008 between Georgia on one side and South Ossetia, Abkhazia and Russia on the other, resulting in a combined South Ossetian, Abkhaz and Russian victory and the expulsion of the Georgian military from both territories.

=== Russia's recognition ===
President Medvedev announcing that he has signed decrees recognising the independence of Abkhazia and South Ossetia (in Russian). Transcript in English.

After hearing the aforementioned appeals from both the Abkhazian and South Ossetian leadership, on 25 August 2008, the Federation Council and State Duma passed motions calling upon President Dmitry Medvedev to recognise the independence of both states and establish diplomatic relations. On 26 August 2008, Medvedev signed decrees recognising the independence of Abkhazia and South Ossetia as sovereign states.

At the UN Security Council, the United States was heavily critical of Russian support for the secessionist governments, accusing the government of violating Georgia's territorial integrity. In response, Vitaly Churkin, the Permanent Representative of Russia to the UN, attacked the U.S. claim to the moral high ground by recalling the 2003 invasion of Iraq. Others accused the United States of hypocrisy, citing its steps against Serbian territorial integrity when it recognised the independence of Kosovo in 2008.

The Russian government also welcomed Nicaragua's recognition of the two states, and called on other countries to "recognise reality" and follow Nicaragua's example. President Daniel Ortega announced that his government "recognises the independence of South Ossetia and Abkhazia and fully supports the Russian government's position." Medvedev also signed into law federal bills ratifying friendship, cooperation, and mutual assistance pacts between his government and those of Abkhazia and South Ossetia. The laws stipulated the obligations of each state to provide assistance to each other if either of them comes under attack, joint protection of Abkhazia and South Ossetia's borders, as well as cooperation on a wide range of economic, social, and humanitarian issues. The states would also jointly counter organised crime, international terrorism, and drug trafficking, documents to this effect were signed for 10 years with an option to extend the deal automatically.

==== Georgia's response ====
Georgian president Mikheil Saakashvili considered Russia's move as an attempt to alter the borders of Europe by force. Below are some excerpts from his statement:

This is the first attempt on European territory ... since Hitler's regime and Stalin's Soviet Union where a large state is trying unilaterally, with the use of force, to completely crush a neighbouring country and openly annex its territory.

This is inconceivable lawlessness and insolence ... Russia has done unthinkable damage to its place in the international community.

The question of the re-establishment of the territorial integrity of Georgia and the protection of its freedom – this is not an internal Georgian problem, or a question of Georgia and Russia. This is now a question of Russia and the rest of the civilised world. Georgia's future, is not only the future of Georgia, this is the future of the whole civilised world...

Deputy Foreign Minister Giga Bokeria said, "This is an unconcealed annexation of these territories, which are a part of Georgia."

On 28 August, the Georgian Parliament passed a resolution declaring Abkhazia and South Ossetia "Russian-occupied territories" and instructed the government to annul all previous treaties on Russian peacekeeping. The following day the government announced that it was severing diplomatic ties with Russia, with the Georgian Embassy in Moscow and the Russian Embassy in Tbilisi to close as a result. Georgia recalled its Ambassador from Russia and ordered all Russian diplomats to leave Georgia, saying that only consular relations would be maintained. The Russian Ministry of Foreign Affairs commented on this decision, saying that some 600,000 to 1 million Georgians in Russia would be left to the "mercy of fate".

Later, Georgia also severed diplomatic relations with Nicaragua. Georgia moved to economically isolate the regions. A ban on economic activity in the regions without Georgian permission was issued, and anyone caught violating this ban by the Georgian authorities faced prosecution. The Georgian Navy blockaded the coast of Abkhazia, and has seized 23 cargo ships trying to bring supplies to Abkhazia, most notably fuel supplies. Abkhazia is dependent on fuel imports, and faced a serious shortage as a result. Russia began deploying boats from its own Black Sea Fleet on 21 September 2009, in response. In August 2009, Russia and South Ossetia accused Georgia of shelling Ossetian villages and kidnapping four South Ossetian citizens. Russia threatened to use force unless the shelling stopped, and put its troops stationed in South Ossetia on high alert.

In January 2010, Georgia adopted a strategy regarding the reintegration of Abkhazia and South Ossetia. The strategy is called Involvement through Cooperation and it was presented to the international organisations as well as to Abkhazia and South Ossetia. The document says Georgia views peaceful methods as the only way for conflict solution and that there won't be a war with these regions. It envisions engagement of people of these two regions through education as well as social, economic and business projects, instead of isolation.

It is officially illegal under Georgian law to enter South Ossetia or Abkhazia through Russia, without permission from Georgia; it is possible to travel through Georgian territory to Abkhazia, though as Georgia cannot assure the safety inside the disputed territories, going to either Abkhazia or South Ossetia is not recommended by the Georgian government. It is not possible for foreigners to enter South Ossetia from Georgian controlled territory, as the South Ossetian de facto authorities do not facilitate nor allow this.

==== Western response ====
The European Union, NATO, the OSCE, and the United States immediately voiced displeasure with Russia's decision.

=== Developments since 2008 ===
After the Russian recognition, Nicaragua, Venezuela, Nauru, Vanuatu and Tuvalu soon followed suit and recognised Abkhazia and South Ossetia as independent states. However, in 2013 and 2014, respectively, Vanuatu and Tuvalu each scrapped their recognition. Russia has invested a significant sum of money in diplomatic strategy to promote recognition of Abkhazia and South Ossetia and display its soft power. However, Russia seems to have stopped investing in the recognition project after 2014. One of the possible reasons might be worsening of the financial situation in Russia following the Russo-Ukrainian War and international sanctions on Russia. Abkhazia has started a new campaign to strengthen its relations with foreign countries and present itself as an independent actor. Abkhaz officials have visited a number of countries, including China, Italy, Turkey and Israel. They have also met with officials from South Africa, Jordan and El Salvador, and sent diplomatic notes to other countries, such as Egypt, France, Guatemala and Sri Lanka. This campaign reached its peak in 2017, but subsequently decreased and largely halted with the beginning of the COVID-19 pandemic. Syria is the only country which has recognised Abkhazia and South Ossetia since 2009.

== States formally recognising Abkhazia or South Ossetia as independent ==
=== UN members ===
	State	Date of recognition	Diplomatic relations established	Notes
1	Russia	26 August 2008	9 September 2008	Main articles: Abkhazia–Russia relations and Russia–South Ossetia relations Ambassadors Semyon Grigoriyev and Elbrus Kargiyev presented their credentials to Abkhaz president Sergey Bagapsh and South Ossetian president Eduard Kokoity on 16 December 2008. An Embassy of Russia to South Ossetia was opened in February 2009. An Embassy of South Ossetia to the Russian Federation was opened in 2009. An Embassy of Russia to Abkhazia was opened on 1 May 2009. An Embassy of Abkhazia to Russia was opened on 18 May 2010.
2	Nicaragua	5 September 2008	10 September 2009 (Abkhazia) 14 April 2010 (South Ossetia)	Main articles: Abkhazia–Nicaragua relations and Nicaragua–South Ossetia relations The ambassador of Nicaragua to Abkhazia resides in Moscow. The South Ossetian Embassy in Managua was opened on 30 August 2011. In 2022, an Abkhaz Embassy in Nicaragua was established. Until then, Abkhazia was represented in Nicaragua via its Ambassador in Caracas.
3	Venezuela	10 September 2009	9 July 2010 (South Ossetia); 23 July 2010 (Abkhazia)	Main articles: Abkhazia–Venezuela relations and South Ossetia–Venezuela relations President Hugo Chávez met the leaders of both states in Caracas and said "I'm sure we, together with Abkhazia and South Ossetia, will be able to build strong relations with Latin American nations such as Paraguay, Uruguay, Cuba, Bolivia, Ecuador, Brazil and Argentina."; Ambassador of Venezuela Hugo José García Hernández presented his credentials to Abkhaz President Sergey Bagapsh on 12 July 2010."; An Embassy of Abkhazia to Venezuela was opened on 12 July 2010.
4	Syria	29 May 2018	22 July 2018	Main article: Abkhazia–Syria relations In May 2018, the Ba'athist Syrian government under Bashar al-Assad recognised the independence of Abkhazia and South Ossetia. In October 2020, the Abkhazian government inaugurated an embassy in Damascus, Syria. The Syrian recognition came amidst the Syrian civil war. In response to Assad's recognition, the Syrian opposition backed Georgia's territorial integrity, with the president of Syrian Negotiation Commission Nasr al-Hariri saying that the Syrian opposition "upholds the red lines of the international law". The Assad regime collapsed in December 2024.

=== Partially recognised states ===
	State	Date of recognition	Diplomatic relations established	Notes
1	Abkhazia; South Ossetia	19 September 2005 or before (Note: It is unclear whether there is a date on which Abkhazia, South Ossetia and Transnistria officially recognised each other or whether they have always done so, and when they established diplomatic relations. Abkhazia and Transnistria signed a Treaty on Friendship and Cooperation on 22 January 1993, South Ossetia and Transnistria a Treaty on Friendship and Cooperation on 12 October 1994 and Abkhazia and South Ossetia a Treaty on Friendship and Cooperation on 19 September 2005.)	26 September 2007	Main article: Abkhazia–South Ossetia relations Abkhazia and South Ossetia mutually recognise each other.
2	Transnistria	22 January 1993 or before (Abkhazia); 12 October 1994 or before (South Ossetia)	—	Main articles: Abkhazia–Transnistria relations and South Ossetia–Transnistria relations Transnistria, Abkhazia and South Ossetia mutually recognise each other. Representative offices of Transnistria in Abkhazia and South Ossetia have been opened. Representative offices of Abkhazia and South Ossetia in Tiraspol have been opened.

=== Former partially recognised states ===
	Entity	Date of recognition	Diplomatic relations established	Notes
1	Donetsk People's Republic	27 June 2014 (South Ossetia); 25 February 2022 (from Abkhazia) and 9 March 2022 (reciprocal recognition from DPR)	12 May 2015 (South Ossetia); 9 March 2022 (Abkhazia)	Main article: Donetsk People's Republic–South Ossetia relations After receiving South Ossetian recognition in 2014, the Donetsk People's Republic reciprocated recognition and additionally recognised Abkhazia on 11 May 2015. On 22 February 2022, the Ministry of Foreign Affairs published a statement welcoming the recognition of independence of the Donetsk and Luhansk People's Republics by Russian president Vladimir Putin. On 25 February 2022 President Aslan Bzhania announced the recognition of the Donetsk People's Republic and Luhansk People's Republic. Russia annexed the DPR on 30 September 2022. The annexation is internationally unrecognised.
2	Luhansk People's Republic	18 June 2014 (South Ossetia); 25 February 2022 (from Abkhazia) and 10 March 2022 (reciprocal recognition from LPR)	28 January 2015 (South Ossetia); 10 March 2022 (Abkhazia)	After receiving diplomatic recognition from South Ossetia in 2014, the Luhansk People's Republic (LPR) reciprocated recognition on 28 January 2015. In April 2015, South Ossetia opened the first foreign embassy in Luhansk. On 22 February 2022, the Ministry of Foreign Affairs published a statement welcoming the recognition of independence of the Donetsk and Luhansk People's Republics by Russian president Vladimir Putin. On 25 February 2022 President Aslan Bzhania announced the recognition of the Donetsk People's Republic and Luhansk People's Republic. On 10 March 2022 the LPR recognised Abkhazia's independence. Russia annexed the LPR on 30 September 2022. The annexation is internationally unrecognised.
3	Republic of Artsakh	17 November 2006	—	Republic of Artsakh, Abkhazia and South Ossetia mutually recognised each other, until the dissolution of Artsakh. On 12 February 2010 it was announced that it is expected to establish diplomatic relations with Abkhazia.

== States that recognised Abkhazia or South Ossetia as independent, but subsequently withdrew recognition ==
=== UN member states ===
	State	Date of recognition	Diplomatic relations established	Notes
1	Tuvalu	18 September 2011 (Abkhazia); 19 September 2011 (South Ossetia)		Main article: Abkhazia–Tuvalu relations On 31 March 2014 Georgia and Tuvalu signed an agreement on establishing diplomatic and consular relations. The agreement was signed by Tuvalu's Minister of Environmental Protection, Foreign Affairs, Labour and Trade, and Georgian Foreign Minister Maya Panjikidze during the visit of Tuvalu's governmental delegation to Georgia. The agreement stipulates that both sides agreed to develop relations on the grounds of the principles of sovereign equality, friendly relations and cooperation, territorial integrity, non-violation of borders and non-interference in homeland affairs. It emphasises that Tuvalu recognises the territorial integrity of Georgia within its international recognised borders, including its regions – Abkhazia's autonomous republic and Tskhinvali region. In April 2014, it was suggested that Russia was more embarrassed by Tuvalu's withdrawal of recognition of Abkhazia and South Ossetia, than by international sanctions for Crimea, since this "decision could spell the end of a years-long diplomatic strategy that has cost Russia millions."
2	Vanuatu	23 May 2011 (Abkhazia)	23 May 2011 (Abkhazia)	Main article: Abkhazia–Vanuatu relations On 23 May 2011 Vanuatu recognised Abkhazia's independence and established diplomatic relations, according to the Abkhazian Ministry of Foreign Affairs, while Vanuatu initially remained silent on the issue. Confusion arose about the actual status of the recognition after a change of Vanuatuan government in June 2011 when officials denied and others reconfirmed the recognition. Russian newspaper Kommersant claimed to have laid their hands on a facsimile of a signed agreement between both countries. However, the issue dragged on for months within Vanuatu's governing ranks, according to some related to domestic power politics and personal feuds. In 2012 Vanuatu's UN envoy maintained the country does not recognise Abkhazia, while a senior official of Vanuatu's Ministry of Foreign Affairs confirmed this by saying "the country has definitely not recognized Abkhazia", adding "the government had expressed the intention to maintain dialogue with Abkhazia". In corroboration of that, Vanuatu maintained throughout the years its support for Georgia's annually submitted United Nations resolution regarding the return of internally displaced persons to Abkhazia, generally seen as an expression of support for the territorial integrity of Georgia. On 18 March 2013, Johnny Koanapo, Vanuatu Director-General of Foreign Affairs, stated that diplomatic relations had never been established with Abkhazia. He said that "There's been a confusion over what the government had intended to do which was just simply a letter stating that there might be an intention to establish relations with Abkhazia. But at this point in time, there's no action on that and there's no decision". On 20 May 2013, the Georgian president Saakashvili said at an Asian summit Vanuatu "changed their mind" and does not recognise Abkhazia, which Vanuatu's new prime minister Moana Carcasses Kalosil confirmed. On 12 July 2013 Georgia and Vanuatu signed an agreement on establishing diplomatic and consular relations, which stated that "the Republic of Vanuatu recognises territorial integrity of Georgia within its internationally recognised borders, including its regions – the Autonomous Republic of Abkhazia and the Tskhinvali Region/South Ossetia." Abkhazia's foreign minister Viacheslav Chirikba responded by claiming that Vanuatu had not officially withdrawn its recognition of Abkhazia. On 30 March 2015, Vanuatu Foreign Minister Sato Kilman met with Chirikba in Moscow, the two officials expressing their desire to strengthen bilateral relations. The following day, Kilman declared in an interview with RIA Novosti that "nothing had changed" in respect to Vanuatu's 2011 recognition of Abkhazia, but that the Carcasses government had merely decided to pursue diplomatic relations with Georgia rather than Abkhazia, that he didn't consider diplomatic relations with Abkhazia and Georgia to be incompatible, and that he hoped diplomatic relations with Abkhazia would soon be formalised. In June 2015, Kilman was sacked as Foreign Minister, partly as a result of this meeting, with Prime Minister Joe Natuman again clarifying the government's position that "Abkhazia is part of Georgia". However, the following week Kilman replaced Natuman as Prime Minister. On 14 March 2019 Vanuatu Foreign Minister Ralph Regenvanu met with his Georgian counterpart David Zalkaliani in Tbilisi. While both sides committed to deepen bilateral ties, Regenvanu "confirmed Vanuatu's support of Georgia's sovereignty and territorial integrity", according to the Georgian Ministry of Foreign Affairs. Zalkaliani commented "We are grateful that the Republic of Vanuatu is consistent in pursuing the non-recognition policy of the so-called independence of Georgia's occupied regions, in full compliance with fundamental norms and principles of international law". The following day Regenvanu visited the conflict line and a Memorandum of Co-operation was signed between the two sides. While at the conflict line, Regenvanu said: "Vanuatu has always recognized the territorial integrity of Georgia. In 2011 we had a minister who expressed a different position. In my opinion, he was influenced by certain individuals and recognized the independence of South Ossetia and Abkhazia. His decision was not an official position of the state".
3	Nauru	15 December 2009 (Abkhazia); 16 December 2009 (South Ossetia)	15 December 2009 (Abkhazia); 16 December 2009 (South Ossetia)	Main article: Abkhazia–Nauru relations Representatives of Nauru were present as observers for the presidential elections in Abkhazia on 26 August 2011. In 2018, the president of South Ossetia appointed a representative for Nauru. On 21 July 2026, Nauru officially revoked diplomatic relations with Abkhazia and South Ossetia. On 30 July 2026, Nauru formally withdrew its recognition of Abkhazia and South Ossetia as independent states.

== States that do not recognise Abkhazia or South Ossetia as independent ==
=== UN member states ===
State	Position
Afghanistan	Neither the Islamic Republic nor the Islamic Emirate of Afghanistan has recognised Abkhazia or South Ossetia. Nevertheless, a delegation of the Islamic Emirate visited Abkhazia in February 2023 and met with the foreign minister.
Albania	The Albanian Ministry of Foreign Affairs issued a statement condemning Russia's decision to recognise Abkhazia and South Ossetia, calling the move "totally unacceptable" and "contrary to UN Security Council resolutions". The Ministry denied any parallels to its own recognition of Kosovo, claiming Kosovo to be a special case.
Antigua and Barbuda	The Prime Minister of Antigua and Barbuda Baldwin Spencer held talks in May 2012 with Irakli Khintba, Deputy Minister of Foreign Affairs of the Republic of Abkhazia, regarding that country's desire to obtain official recognition from Antigua and Barbuda. Baldwin Spencer pledged to continue dialogue on the issue with Abkhazian officials. In 2022, the Abkhaz foreign minister had a telephone conversation with Paul Chet Greene, the Minister of Foreign Affairs, International Trade and Immigration of Antigua and Barbuda.
Argentina	The Abkhaz foreign minister Maxim Gvinjia said in 2010 that Abkhazia hoped to establish diplomatic relations with Argentina. Abkhazia even planned to open an embassy in Buenos Aires. Even without recognition, South Ossetia has an unofficial representative in Argentina.
Armenia	In 2008, President Serzh Sargsyan (in office 2008–2018) stated that Armenia will not formally recognise Abkhazia and South Ossetia as independent states any time soon but reiterated his support for their residents' right to self-determination. He also said that Armenia will not recognise them for the same reason that it did not recognise Kosovo's independence and that Armenia can not recognise another entity in the same situation as long as it has not recognised the Nagorno-Karabakh Republic. Tigran Balayan, Head of the Ministry of Foreign Affairs Press Office said, "Armenia has always favoured and continues to believe that any attempt for military solution to conflicts is futile. Such conflicts should be resolved on the basis of free expression of the will of the people". In 2016, Sargsyan met with then Vice-Foreign Minister of Abkhazia Kan Tania. In 2023, Prime Minister Nikol Pashinyan stated that Armenia respected and acknowledged Georgia's territorial integrity and considered Abkhazia and South Ossetia to be Georgian territories. For the first time, in 2024, Armenia voted in favour of the Georgia resolution at the United Nations, in which the United Nations General Assembly reiterated the right of return of all displaced persons and refugees to Georgia's Abkhazia and Tskhinvali Region/South Ossetia and reaffirmed support for Georgia's territorial integrity.
Australia	Foreign Minister Stephen Smith said that "the declaration overnight by Russian President Medvedev I don't believe is a helpful contribution. Indeed some may regard that as provocative. I don't think it helps circumstances in Georgia and I don't think it helps relationships generally between Russia and the rest of the world. Australia respects the territorial integrity of Georgia and our ongoing position is that we believe that Russia should abide by the ceasefire effected through the European Union and President Sarkozy and return its forces to the positions they occupied on August 6 and 7".
Austria	Foreign Minister Ursula Plassnik said that "this step goes against all the principles of Georgian sovereignty, independence and territorial integrity, which Russia has repeatedly accepted in the UN Security Council. The Georgian conflict must be solved through dialogue and international mediation, not through unilateral measures".
Azerbaijan	On 9 December 1994, the Ministry of Foreign Affairs of Azerbaijan stated that the Abkhazian Supreme Soviet's unilateral declaration of sovereignty was "a flagrant violation" and that "it is contrary to the peace negotiations and creates new serious threats in the region". On 27 August 2008, Azerbaijani Foreign Ministry spokesman Khazar Ibrahim stated, "Azerbaijan's position remains unchanged. We recognise Georgia's territorial integrity".
Belarus	Main article: Foreign relations of Abkhazia § Belarus On 28 August 2008, Vasily Dolgolyov, the Belarusian ambassador to Russia, said that Belarus would in the next day or two recognise the independence of Abkhazia and South Ossetia. President Alexander Lukashenko had also expressed support for Russia, saying "Under the circumstances Russia had no other moral choice but to support appeals of South Ossetian and Abkhazian peoples on the recognition of their right for self-determination in line with fundamental international documents." Lukashenko then suggested considering this issue at the CSTO Collective Security Council Summit on 5 September 2008. However, Lukashenko later reaffirmed Belarus' intentions to recognise the breakaway republics, stating that the issue would be addressed after the parliamentary election on 28 September 2008. On 25 September, President of Abkhazia Sergei Bagapsh and President of South Ossetia Eduard Kokoity officially requested that Lukashenko recognise the independence of their republics. In September 2008 it was announced that the Belarusian parliament would debate on the recognition of Abkhazia and South Ossetia "soon". However, Belarus decided not to recognise the two regions as independent states. According to Peter Rutland, the EU has rewarded the Belarusian president Lukashenko for not recognising the republics by suspending the travel ban for top Belarusian officials that had been imposed in 2004. Karel Schwarzenberg has stated publicly, that if Belarus recognises Abkhazia and South Ossetia, it can forget about the Eastern Partnership. "If they would recognize South Ossetia and Abkhazia it would create a very, very difficult situation for Belarus," Schwarzenberg has said. Sweden, co-author of the Eastern Partnership program, rejected Lavrov's position as "completely unacceptable". The EU's position on Georgia is not 'blackmail' but "is about upholding the principles of the EU and international law, which Russia should also be respecting", stated Swedish foreign minister Carl Bildt According to Eurasianet.org, which cites Russian media reports, Belarus is under Kremlin pressure to recognise South Ossetia and Abkhazia. There have been suppositions Russia has offered Belarus a $500 million credit on condition that Belarus recognises the two regions as independent. In June 2009, President Alexander Lukashenko of Belarus said Moscow had made recognition of South Ossetia and Abkhazia a condition for Belarus to receive the last $500 million of a $2 billion loan, but added that Belarus' position was not for sale. Russian officials have denied any such link. Belarusian lawmakers visited Abkhazia and South Ossetia in late 2009 to study the situation and decide to postpone decision to spring 2010. South Ossetia asked for a symmetrical approach between them and Abkhazia. In 2021, an OSCE expert estimated that Belarus might be one of the next countries to recognise Abkhazia. In November 2021, South Ossetian president Anatoly Bibilov said that he expects a diplomatic recognition from Belarus soon. In 2022, Alexander Lukashenko visited Abkhazia for the first time and met with the Abkhaz president Bzhania and proclaimed "We want to build not just a bridge of friendship, but very serious relations." However, Belarus still did not recognise Abkhazia's independence.
Belgium	Belgian foreign minister Karel De Gucht called the recognition of South Ossetia and Abkhazia unacceptable and a violation of the territorial integrity of Georgia. He added that Russia has created a dangerous precedent that threatens the stability of Europe. Nevertheless, South Ossetia named a representative for the Benelux countries.
Bulgaria	In 2008, Foreign Ministry spokesperson Dimitar Tsanchev said, "The decision of Russian authorities to recognise the independence of Abkhazia and South Ossetia is causing serious worry. Bulgaria once again re-iterates its unconditional support for the independence, sovereignty and internationally recognised borders". Despite this official stance, Bulgarian trade with Abkhazia surged in the end of the 2010s. In 2018, a Bulgarian business delegation had visited Abkhazia and met with Abkhaz prime minister Gennadi Gagulia. Abkhazia has an unofficial representative in Bulgaria.
Bosnia and Herzegovina	Bosnia and Herzegovina has not officially recognised the independence of Abkhazia or South Ossetia. In June 2017, Milorad Dodik, the president of the Republika Srpska, has met with the then newly elected South Ossetian president Anatoliy Bibilov. Dodik expressed his readiness for cooperation with South Ossetia. According to the South Ossetian press service, the two agreed tentatively that Dodik would visit Tskhinvali on 20 September 2017. In January 2018, the South Ossetian president Bibilov attended the Republika Srpska's "Statehood Day" and representatives of South Ossetia and Republika Srpska signed a memorandum of cooperation in Banja Luka. Additionally, Bibilov opened a representation office in Banja Luka. Georgia sent a protest note to Bosnia and Herzegovina, and Bosnian Ministry of Foreign Affairs issued a statement, saying that Bosnia and Herzegovina has "good and friendly relations with Georgia based on mutual respect of territorial integrity and sovereignty". The ministry also noted that it was unaware of the visit of Bibilov. However, President of President of Republika Srpska Milorad Dodik said that Bibilov was visiting "the Serb entity, not the Bosnian state". He also stated that "Georgia does not have a friendly attitude towards the RS [Republika Srpska], we know that, and neither do we have one towards it".
Bolivia	Bolivia has not officially recognised the independence of Abkhazia or South Ossetia. In April 2009, the Abkhaz foreign ministry announced that it expects a recognition of Bolivia soon. Then-foreign minister Viacheslav Chirikba later said that his announcement was a mistake and the recognition never materialised. In 2018, a member of the Bolivian embassy in Venezuela attended a celebration at the Abkhaz embassy in Caracas. In 2021, the Abkhaz ambassador in Venezuela met with the Bolivian ambassador in the same country. During the meeting, both discussed the establishment of humanitarian, trade and economic ties between both countries.
Brazil	Brazil has not recognised the independence of Abkhazia and South Ossetia. Immediately after the war in 2008, Brazilian foreign minister Celso Amorim said that his country "defends in a very strong way the principle of territorial integrity" and does not plan to recognise any new state anytime soon. Nevertheless, South Ossetia named a representative for Brazil who works on "connecting with economic and political circles in the country" in 2013.
Burundi	In 2024, Burundi voted against the Georgia resolution at the United Nations which would United Nations General Assembly adopted a resolution to reiterate the right of return of all displaced persons and refugees to Georgia's Abkhazia and Tskhinvali Region/South Ossetia and support Georgia's territorial integrity.
Canada	Minister of Foreign Affairs, David Emerson, issued the statement on the situation in Georgia saying that "Canada is gravely concerned about Russia's recognition of the independence of South Ossetia and Abkhazia. This recognition violates Georgia's territorial integrity and sovereignty and is contrary to UN Security Council resolutions supported by Russia, as well as to the six-point peace plan brokered by President Nicolas Sarkozy on behalf of the EU".
China	On 27 August 2008 Foreign Ministry spokesman Qin Gang said that China is "concerned of the latest development in South Ossetia and Abkhazia". He also said "We have a knowledge of the complicated history and reality of the South Ossetia and Abkhazia issues. In accordance with China's consistent and principled stance on issues of this kind, we hope the relevant parties can resolve the issue through dialogue and consultation". At the first SCO summit after the Russian recognition of Abkhazia and South Ossetia, Chinese president Hu Jintao played a pivotal role in resisting Russian lobbying for the recognition of independence for Abkhazia and South Ossetia. Since 2015, Chinese firms have started commercial relations with Abkhazia. In 2019, Abkhazia participated in the International Exhibition for Food, Beverages, Hotel/Restaurant equipment, Foodservice, Catering, Bakery and Retail Industries in Shanghai and a Chinese business delegation visited Abkhazia. The delegation even met with the Abkhaz foreign minister Daur Kove. In 2021, the Chinese ambassador in Syria met with the Abkhaz ambassador in Syria.
Costa Rica	At a UN Security Council meeting regarding the Georgia situation, Jorge Urbina, the Permanent Representative to the UN for Costa Rica, referred to the Russian actions as the dismemberment of a UN member state by force. "We cannot, and the international community should not, reward this approach, which is counter in all aspects to international law.... Such a settlement could not be based on 'might is right' and must include respect for the territorial integrity of Georgia, the rights of the peoples of Abkhazia and South Ossetia, and the integrity of international law and the principles of peaceful coexistence as enshrined in the United Nations Charter."
Croatia	Former president Stjepan Mesić stated that he is worried over the Russian decision and said that "such a decision makes the complex situation in the region even more complex". He also said that "fait accompli policy could create an impression that the move was aimed at avoiding talks on the future status of South Ossetia and Abkhazia". Neven Jurica, former Croatian Permanent Representative to the United Nations, called the Russian Federation's action regrettable and illegitimate.
Cuba	In 2024, Cuba voted against the Georgia resolution at the United Nations which would United Nations General Assembly adopted a resolution to reiterate the right of return of all displaced persons and refugees to Georgia's Abkhazia and Tskhinvali Region/South Ossetia and support Georgia's territorial integrity.
Cyprus	Foreign Minister Markos Kyprianou has said that relations of Russia and Cyprus are very close but on the other hand Cyprus supports "the respect and protection of the territorial integrity of states, and this is a principle which the Republic of Cyprus supports and supported in the case of Kosovo, so developments of the past few days in Georgia have worried us". The government has issued a statement saying that "Cyprus expresses its deep concern over developments in Georgia. The Republic of Cyprus supports the respect of the rules of international law including the respect of the territorial integrity of states, of the UN Charter and of the principles of the Helsinki Final Act. Moreover, the Cyprus Government supports peaceful resolution of international disputes by political means through negotiations, avoiding unilateral actions that could aggravate the situation in this sensitive region".
Czech Republic	The Czech Ministry of Foreign Affairs issued a statement calling Russia's action "an attack on the independence, sovereignty and territorial integrity of Georgia".
Denmark	Foreign Minister Per Stig Møller declared "unconditional support for Georgia's territorial integrity".
Dominican Republic	Dominican Republic MPs Francisco Matos and Ramon Fernandez travelled to Abkhazia in December 2010 and met with Abkhaz officials, including Sergey Shamba, Maxim Gvindzhia and Nugzar Ashuba. The Dominican Republic politicians voiced their support for the establishment of friendly ties with Abkhazia, and invited their Abkhazian counterparts to visit their country to establish inter-parliamentary ties. Dominican Republic Deputy Prime Minister José Miguel Abreu visited Abkhazia in May 2011 and met with senior Abkhaz government officials. Sergey Bagapsh stated in Moscow that recognition from a Latin American nation could be expected in May. Philip H. Gordon, the American Assistant Secretary of State for European and Eurasian Affairs, then warned the Dominican Republic against recognising the independence of Abkhazia and South Ossetia. The United States government invited President Leonel Fernández to New York City for a conference and sent a private plane for that purpose. After his visit, the Dominican government did not communicate anymore with the Abkhaz government.
Ecuador	Abkhazia submitted a request to be recognised in December 2009. According to one confidential US diplomatic cable released by WikiLeaks, possibility of Ecuador's recognition of Abkhazia or South Ossetia "was played up" in the press and Correa made no such commitments to Russia. To this day, Ecuador has not recognised Abkhazia or South Ossetia.
Estonia	Foreign Minister Urmas Paet stated "Russia's move is a deliberate breach of international law and the principles of stability in Europe. Estonia, like all European Union and NATO member states, adheres firmly to the principles of Georgia's territorial integrity".
Eritrea	Eritrea has not recognised Abkhazia and South Ossetia. Nevertheless, there were official meetings between Eritrean and Abkhazian and South Ossetian officials. On 10 June 2014, Abkhaz foreign minister Viacheslav Chirikba held a meeting with the delegation of the State of Eritrea consisting of the Ambassador Extraordinary and Plenipotentiary of the State of Eritrea in the Russian Federation Teklay Minassie Asgedom and Head of the Department of Asia and the Pacific of the Ministry of Foreign Affairs of the State of Eritrea Kalekristos Zariseney Gebreyezus in the MFA of Abkhazia. On 19 April 2018, South Ossetian foreign minister Dmitry Medoev met with the Ambassador Extraordinary and Plenipotentiary of the State of Eritrea to the Russian Federation, Petros Tseggay Asged, in Yalta.
Finland	Finnish foreign minister Alexander Stubb said that "the recognition of independence for South Ossetia and Abkhazia violates fundamental OSCE principles. As all OSCE participating States, Russia is committed to respecting the sovereignty and territorial integrity of others. Russia should follow OSCE principles by respecting the territorial integrity and sovereignty of Georgia. Russia should immediately withdraw all troops from Georgia and implement the ceasefire agreement, including the modalities defined in the 16 August 2008 letter of French President Nicolas Sarkozy. The international community cannot accept unilaterally established buffer zones".
France	The French Foreign Ministry spokesman said, "We consider this is a regrettable decision and I recall our attachment to the territorial integrity of Georgia". French Foreign Minister Bernard Kouchner said that "in a certain way, yes, ethnic cleansing is taking place" in villages previously controlled by the Georgian side. "We cannot accept these violations of international law, of accords for security and cooperation in Europe, of United Nations resolutions, and the taking ... of a territory by the army of a neighbouring country."
Germany	Chancellor Angela Merkel said, "this contradicts the principle of territorial integrity, a principle based on the international law of nations and for this reason it is unacceptable".
Greece	Minister of Foreign Affairs Dora Bakoyannis stated that among the principles of Greek foreign policy is "respect for the independence and territorial integrity of states". Furthermore, she expressed dismay at the developments and stated that they subscribed to the French Presidency's statement condemning the decision to recognise the regions of South Ossetia and Abkhazia.
Haiti	Haiti does not recognise the independence of Abkhazia and South Ossetia. In 2022, the Haitian ambassador in Venezuela met the Abkhaz ambassador in that country and they exchanged views on a wide range of issues of interstate cooperation and discussed the prospects for establishing bilateral cooperation.
Hungary	The Hungarian Foreign Ministry issued a statement, regretting the decision of the Russian government and stating that "these decisions do not serve the stability of the Caucasus region and do not advance negotiations over a settlement of the very conflict which has produced severe humanitarian and material consequences".
Iceland	Sturla Böðvarsson, Speaker of Althing, condemned Russia for recognising the independence of Abkhazia and South Ossetia in a joint declaration with speakers of Norway, Sweden, Finland, Denmark, Estonia, Latvia and Lithuania. Statement said that the recognition violates United Nations Security Council resolutions and contradicts principles of the Organization for Security and Co-operation in Europe. Speakers also called on Russia to reverse its decision.
Indonesia	Marty Natalegawa, Indonesian Permanent Representative to the United Nations, said that he had been watching the situation apprehensively and that the developments were of deep concern and did not speak well for the Security Council. He said that his country had spoken in favour of diplomacy and the power of argument over force and that the Sarkozy six-point document had been a welcome development that should have ensured that the principle of the inviolability of a State's sovereignty and territorial integrity remained intact. He expressed disappointment that the Security Council had instead remained silent in the face of the violation. He also said that the principles of the peaceful resolution of differences and of territorial integrity were fundamental. In 2018, the South Ossetian foreign minister met with a special representative of the Government of Indonesia, Nicolas Messet, in Nauru.
Iran	The ambassador of Iran to Russia, Mahmoud Reza Sajjadi, said in February 2009 that his nation will not recognise Abkhazia and South Ossetia's independence in the near future, "as it can cause war in many areas," but on the other hand he did not rule out eventual Iranian recognition of the independence of the two areas. Sajjadi defended Russia's measures in the 2008 South Ossetia war and its decision to recognise Abkhazia and South Ossetia as independent nations. Sajjadi also said he sympathised with the people of Abkhazia and South Ossetia and that Tehran will work with Moscow to develop the two areas' economy. In December 2019, Sergey Shakaryants, an Armenian specialist on the South Caucasus, wrote that the Iranians "have convinced the leaders of South Ossetia that Iran may soon recognise their republic diplomatically".
Ireland	Minister for Foreign Affairs, Micheál Martin stated in a statement that "This deeply regrettable decision is contrary to the principles of Georgia's sovereignty, independence and territorial integrity. Moreover, it can only complicate the urgent task of finding political solutions to the acute difficulties in the region and to the wider international tensions which have developed over the past weeks".
Israel	Main article: Foreign relations of Abkhazia § Israel The Israeli Ministry of Foreign Affairs stated on 10 August 2008 that "Israel is following with great concern the developments in South Ossetia and Abkhazia and hopes the violence will end. Israel recognises the territorial integrity of Georgia and calls for a peaceful solution."
Italy	Foreign Minister Franco Frattini said "The move does not apply in an international legal framework. An ethnic-based balkanisation of the Caucasus is a serious danger for all". Nevertheless, Italy has relatively close relations with Abkhazia. In 2016, an Abkhaz cultural institute and in 2017, an unofficial Abkhaz diplomatic mission opened in Rome. Additionally, South Ossetia opened an unofficial mission in Rome in 2016. The Italian authorities do not recognise it.
Japan	Yasuaki Tanizaki, director general of the Japanese Foreign Ministry's European bureau, said "Our country is gravely concerned about the move. Our country hopes that Russia [...] will take responsible actions for the region's stability".
Jordan	Jordan has not recognised the independence of Abkhazia and South Ossetia. Nevertheless, a high-ranking delegation of the country visited Abkhazia in 2018. The members of the delegations included the vice-president of the Senate of Jordan and other prominent politicians. Abkhazia has a representative in Jordan.
Kazakhstan	In 2008, Kazakhstan's president Nursultan Nazarbayev said he understood the measures taken by Russia and urged the international community against raising the prospect of a new Cold War, while also saying he considers that "Russia's actions were directed to protect the residents of long-suffering regions. In response Russia could either ignore or prevent the bloodshed". In October 2008, Foreign Minister Marat Tazhin said that "the principle of territorial integrity is key in international law" and that for this reason Kazakhstan did not recognise Abkhazia and South Ossetia or Kosovo. In December 2008, Prime Minister Karim Masimov stated that "We have an official position. Kazakhstan did not recognise Kosovo and does not recognise Abkhazia and South Ossetia. We consider that borders are defined and Kazakhstan will not recognise any new states." Kazakhstan also send humanitarian aid to the conflict zone and offered help with peace talks. In 2019, South Ossetia began exporting goods to Kazakhstan. In 2022, the Abkhaz and the South Ossetian government supported the CSTO intervention in the country during the 2022 Kazakh unrest.
Kyrgyzstan	At a Minsk press conference on 27 August 2008, Kyrgyzstan's Ambassador to Belarus said regarding South Ossetian and Abkhazian independence that "(a)ll legal aspects should be measured as the situation is unusual. It is unusual in view of the recognition of separate states in the CIS and Georgia's withdrawal from the CIS. These issues allow us to approach the topic with due consideration, allow us to study and listen to analysts, observers, counsellors of state. As the issue is being studied I cannot express an opinion because the issue is too fresh".
Latvia	Foreign Minister Māris Riekstiņš condemned Russia's recognition of Abkhazia and South Ossetia. Stating that such "a decision is contrary to the principles of Georgia's independence, sovereignty and territorial integrity, which are recognised by the United Nations' Charter, the Final Act of the Helsinki Conference on Security and Cooperation in Europe and the UN Security Council resolutions". In December 2009, President of Latvia Valdis Zatlers, said that Latvia will never recognise the independence of Abkhazia and South Ossetia.
Lebanon	The leader of Lebanon's parliamentary majority Saad Hariri statement states, "The recognition issue will be solved at the highest state level. But we will fine-tune contacts with South Ossetia and Abkhazia now. For example, delegations of our businessmen will leave for there soon; Lebanon feels what situation South Ossetia was stuck in; Lebanon is also a small state which comes under threats. On one side there is Israel, which has attacked us many times. On the other side there is Syria which threatens Lebanon from time to time; Russians were taking measures to protect their citizens and local residents in South Ossetia; Russia is one of the states which in no way wants to get involved in military conflicts; Moscow's negative attitude to the beginning of the war in Iraq and efforts made to prevent military scenario in Iran's situation are examples for this. Russia advocates peaceful resolution everywhere".
Lithuania	Lithuania's prime minister Gediminas Kirkilas said that Russia's decision to recognise Abkhazia and South Ossetia was a violation of the sovereignty and territorial integrity of Georgia.
Luxembourg	A joint Ministry of State and Ministry of Foreign Affairs statement states "We noted with regret the decision taken by the Russian authorities to recognise the independence of Abkhazia and South Ossetia, a decision contrary to the basic principles of the UN Charter and the OSCE. It is contrary with the obligations which Russia took on several occasions at the time of Security Council resolution votes, in particular Resolution 1808". Nevertheless, South Ossetia named a representative for the Benelux countries.
Mali	In 2024, Mali voted against the Georgia resolution at the United Nations which would United Nations General Assembly adopted a resolution to reiterate the right of return of all displaced persons and refugees to Georgia's Abkhazia and Tskhinvali Region/South Ossetia and support Georgia's territorial integrity.
Mexico	The government of Mexico expressed concern for stability, peace and international security following the Russian recognition and urged all parties to achieve a peaceful solution and lasting peace in the Caucasus region through dialogue. It also called on those involved to respect the principles of the Charter of the United Nations and international law.
Federated States of Micronesia	In 2011, the government of the Federated States of Micronesia established diplomatic relations with Georgia. Nevertheless, the then-President of Micronesia, Peter M. Christian, met the South Ossetian foreign minister in 2018.
Republic of Moldova	Faced with its own breakaway region, Transnistria, the government of Moldova released a statement saying it would not recognise the independence of Abkhazia and South Ossetia. Gagauzia, an autonomous region of Moldova, passed a resolution, recognising independence of Abkhazia and South Ossetia, backing Russia's actions in the regions, and asking central Moldova's government to recognise these states.
Montenegro	Montenegro does not recognise the independence of Abkhazia and South Ossetia. In 2016, Abkhazia participated in an international tourism fair called the International Tourism Exchange, Tourism Fair, Equipment for Hotels and Catering (METUBES 2016) in Budva. After Georgian protests, the Abkhaz exhibition pavillon was closed.
Netherlands	Dutch Foreign Minister Maxime Verhagen expressed on behalf of the cabinet his "great concern" about the Russian position and said that "for the Netherlands, the territorial integrity of Georgia within the internationally recognised borders, also earlier recognised by Russia, remains the basis for a solution to this crisis. The one-sided recognition of South Ossetia and Abkhazia by Russia does not bring this solution nearer". Nevertheless, South Ossetia named a representative for the Benelux countries.
North Korea	In 2024, North Korea voted against the Georgia resolution at the United Nations General Assembly which would adopt a resolution to reiterate the right of return of all displaced persons and refugees to Georgia's Abkhazia and Tskhinvali Region/South Ossetia and support Georgia's territorial integrity.
Norway	Minister of Foreign Affairs Jonas Gahr Støre said that "Norway emphasises the use of peaceful means in the efforts to settle conflicts in Europe, based on the UN's assumption of respect for territorial integrity. A recognition of the breakaway Georgian regions are in breach of these assumptions. And it is not a constructive contribution to a long range and peaceful solution to the conflict".
Oman	Oman has not recognised the independence of either Abkhazia or South Ossetia. Nevertheless, the ambassador of Oman in Damascus met with the Abkhaz ambassador in 2021.
Pakistan	Pakistan does not recognise the independence of Abkhazia and South Ossetia. In January 2021, the president of the Association of Pakistanis in Russia met with Abkhaz foreign minister Daur Kove. They discussed the establishment of Abkhaz-Pakistani business relations. In March 2021, the ambassador of Pakistan in Syria met with the Abkhaz ambassador in the same country.
Panama	Ricardo Alberto Arias, Panama's UN Ambassador stated his nation's continuing support for the territorial integrity of Georgia in a Security Council meeting on 28 August 2008.
Peru	Ollanta Humala, leader of the Peruvian Nationalist Party, said his party had submitted a proposal to the Peruvian Congress for recognition of Abkhazia and South Ossetia. He cited Peru's recognition of Kosovo as a justification.
Poland	Foreign Minister Radosław Sikorski called for respect for Georgia's territorial integrity. The president of Poland Lech Kaczyński said that the Russian decision violates international law and is an attempt to sanction the consequences of an "unprecedented aggression" by Russia against an independent Georgian state. Kaczyński urged Russian President Dmitry Medvedev to "immediately withdraw all Russian troops from Georgia" and pledged his country's "unwavering support" for the Georgian people.
Portugal	The Ministry of Foreign Affairs issued a statement saying that "The respect for the sovereignty of the Georgia inside of its internationally recognised borders has been permanently underlined for United Nations, the European Union and the Organization for Security and Co-operation in Europe".
Romania	The Foreign Ministry issued a statement saying that "This unilateral, regrettable and legally unfounded act can affect the situation in the area, as well as the perspectives of solving the region's conflicts. As an EU and NATO member, Romania will plead inside the international organisations it belongs to, as well as in bilateral relationships with the countries in the region for a solution that will respect the territorial integrity of Georgia".
San Marino	In 2011, the San Marino authorities declared, that they are planning to establish political, cultural and scientific contacts with Abkhazia. The same year, a delegation of the Abkhaz foreign ministry was the first time in San Marino. In April 2012, the Secretary of State for Foreign and Political Affairs, Antonella Mularoni, said that the San Marino government will continue to respect Georgia's territorial boundaries and will not recognise Abkhazia. In 2013, the governments of Abkhazia and South Ossetia asked San Marino for a recognition of their independence. The same year, Abkhazia appointed a representative for San Marino. Even though San Marino does not recognise the independence of South Ossetia, the South Ossetian foreign minister Dmitry Medoyev visited the country in 2017. He met the chairman of the Committee on Foreign Affairs of the Grand and General Council and a group of the then-governing party Democratic Socialist Left. Despite the lack of diplomatic relations, South Ossetia regularly sends diplomatic notes to San Marino. In 2021, South Ossetia appointed a representative for San Marino who resides in the small republic.
Saudi Arabia	During a meeting with Prime Minister Vladimir Putin, the Secretary of the Saudi National Security Council, Bandar bin Sultan, told that King Abdullah and the whole leadership of the country had full understanding for the actions of the Russian side in South Ossetia. Saudi Arabia does not recognise Abkhazia or South Ossetia. In May 2012, during the visit to Georgia, Abdullah bin Zamil Al-Drees, a head of the delegation of Majlis al-Shura of Saudi Arabia, said that the kingdom's position was based on its foreign policy in support of the territorial integrity of countries.
Serbia	The Serbian Ministry of Foreign Affairs issued a statement saying that they respected the "territorial integrity of internationally recognized states" but that the declaration of independence by the Republic of Kosovo and its subsequent international recognition has had a destabilising effect by setting a precedent for similar declarations by other regions. On 3 September 2008, President Boris Tadić stated the position of Serbia as "Serbia is not going to recognise these so-called new countries." In May 2012, the Serbian Parliament was to consider formal recognition of Abkhazia and South Ossetia.
Sierra Leone	The Foreign Ministry of Sierra Leone has never published any statement regarding the territorial integrity of Georgia or the recognition of Abkhazia or South Ossetia. In 2019, a representative of the Parliament of Sierra Leone met with a delegation of the Parliament of South Ossetia.
Slovakia	A statement issued by the Ministry of Foreign Affairs said that Slovakia "disapproves of these steps and confirms the main principles, based on the long-standing position of the Slovak Republic regarding Georgia and the solution of conflicts on its territory. These principles are: sovereignty and territorial integrity of Georgia within its internationally recognised borders and solution of the conflicts exclusively by peaceful means and talks in compliance with the international law". The statement also said that "the Slovak government, as one of few EU member states, can insist on the principle of the territorial integrity of Georgia, as it has done also in the case of Serbia and Kosovo".
Slovenia	Prime Minister Janez Janša said "We are united on the need to ensure peace, stability, territorial integrity in Georgia and the broader region and to give the region a European perspective" after a meeting with Czech and Latvian counterparts Mirek Topolánek and Ivars Godmanis.
Somalia	Somalia's External Affairs and International Co-operation ministry said on 5 October 2008 in Mogadishu that Somalia recognises the territorial integrity of Georgia. Somalia's Ambassador to Russia Mohammed Mahmud Handule on 1 October 2008 was reported as saying Somalia's Transitional Federal Government would recognise the independence of Abkhazia and South Ossetia. This stance was rebuffed by Mohamed Jama Ali, the General Director of the External Affairs and International Co-operation ministry (Somali Ministry of Foreign Affairs) as "an irregular statement"," which does not represent our government's foreign policy".
South Africa	In 2008, Dumisani Kumalo, the Permanent Representative of South Africa to the United Nations, said that his country "had repeatedly stressed the need for countries to resolve differences through negotiations. A resort to the use of force diminished the chance for a lasting solution to a situation and it increased the suffering of all the people involved". Nevertheless, the South African ambassador to Venezuela met the Abkhaz ambassador in the same country in 2018.
South Korea	Aligning itself with Russia, South Korea's president Lee Myung-bak signed a joint declaration with Russia which stated that the two countries shared "a common assessment of Georgia's invasion of South Ossetia." South Korea also coincided with Russia in expressing "concern over the recent situation in Georgia" and support for "using peaceful means and dialogue to settle the problem." In 2018, a South Ossetian delegation – including foreign minister Dmitry Medoev – visited South Korea.
Spain	Foreign Minister Miguel Ángel Moratinos said that the government of Spain regrets the decision of Russia. He also said that this decision by Moscow is "unacceptable" and "not conducive to creating the conditions necessary for settlement of the conflict between Russia and Georgia". Moratinos reiterated the "need to fully respect the principles of international law, in particular the territorial integrity of states, in this case, of Georgia." In addition, he recalled that this is the stance that "Spain has always maintained", an allusion to the opposition of the Spanish government to recognition of the Kosovo independence.
Sudan	On 28 August 2008, Sudan's envoy to the UN, Abdel-Haleem Abdel-Mahmood, stated that Sudan's recognition of Abkhazia and South Ossetia is contingent upon developments on the issue of Kosovo's declaration of independence in the International Court of Justice. As Sudan remains opposed to Kosovo's independence, their negative view about such declarations may change only if it is declared legal by the ICJ.
Sweden	Swedish Minister of Foreign Affairs Carl Bildt condemned Russia's recognition, saying that "the Russian government leadership now has chosen this route means they have chosen a policy of confrontation, not only with the rest of Europe, but also with the international community in general". Carl Bildt predicted that the recognition of the independence of South Ossetia and Abkhazia is likely to be followed by only a "miserable" lot of other countries, such as Belarus, Syria, Cuba and Venezuela. Bildt also said that "South Ossetian independence is a joke. We are talking about a smugglers' paradise of 60,000 people financed by the Russian security services. No one can seriously consider that as an independent state". In December 2009, Carl Bildt said that "this idea of South Ossetia's independence is increasingly seen as bad joke in Moscow, which it obviously is."
Switzerland	The government of Switzerland called for a political solution to the conflict in Georgia in accord with international principles: Both Georgia's right to sovereignty and the democratic will of the people in South Ossetia and Abkhazia have to be respected. A government spokesman also stated "Switzerland regrets that a solution has not yet been found that meets the United Nations Charter, the Helsinki Accords and the Charter of Paris. The Swiss government has not yet discussed the issue of independence of Abkhazia and South Ossetia. It also did not mention the territorial integrity in the context of Georgia.
Tajikistan	The Moscow Times reports that the president of Tajikistan, Emomalii Rahmon, expressed his support for Russia's recognition of South Ossetia and Abkhazia, stating, "Our countries are natural strategic partners... which envisions... support for each other's actions." He also stated, that Russia and Georgia should solve their conflict through political and diplomatic means.
Turkey	Main article: Abkhazia–Turkey relations A Foreign Ministry statement on 26 August 2008 declared that "Turkey attaches importance to the independence, sovereignty and territorial integrity of Georgia and is highly concerned about the recent developments. Turkey is of the opinion that this conflict should be resolved through peaceful means". On 26 May 2018, The Turkish National Defense Minister Nurettin Canikli stated that Turkey is supporting Georgia's territorial integrity.
Ukraine	In 2008, Ukrainian Deputy Prime Minister Grigoriy Nemirya stated that Kyiv took an unchangeable and principal position to support Georgia's territorial integrity and sovereignty. The Ministry of Foreign Affairs issued a statement calling the recognition a "gross violation of norms and principles of the international law, bilateral and multilateral agreements, in particular the United Nations Charter and Helsinki Accords. Actual annexation of part of Georgian territory through creation and support of the puppet regimes certifies a reanimation of doctrine of 'right of force' in the Russian Federation for solving of international problems. Ukraine categorically reprobates an adventurous decision of Russia to recognise the self-declared independence and calls for international community to combine efforts in relation to absolute confirmation and observance of territorial integrity of Georgia and implementation of the undertaken international obligations of Russia". It also said that the Commonwealth of Independent States are bound to respect the territorial integrity of other CIS states, in this case Georgia. The chairman of the Verkhovna Rada Arseniy Yatsenyuk said "only the United Nations can rule on this question. This is factually a violation of international law". President Viktor Yushchenko stressed that Ukraine does not support the decision of Russia to recognise the independence of South Ossetia and Abkhazia. "We are sorry about [the] adoption of such a decision. For Ukraine it is unacceptable therefore we cannot support the position." However, the parliament of Ukraine's Autonomous Republic of Crimea passed a resolution, supporting independence of Abkhazia and South Ossetia, backing Russia's actions in the regions, and urging the Ukrainian parliament to "accept" the independence of these states. A similar Party of Regions resolution in the Ukrainian parliament denouncing Georgia and calling upon Ukraine to recognise the independence of both territories failed. In October 2009, Ukrainian ambassador to Russia Kostyantyn Gryshchenko said that "We must not recognize neither Kosovo nor Abkhazia, nor South Ossetia in no case". In March 2010, President Viktor Yanukovych said that the recognition of South Ossetia and Abkhazia was "not currently on the agenda." This was confirmed by the Minister for Foreign Affairs Kostyantyn Gryshchenko on 14 May 2010: "An issue of territorial integrity and inviolability of frontiers is a matter of principle for us. Period". On 4 June 2010, Ukrainian president Viktor Yanukovych said, "I have never recognized Abkhazia, South Ossetia or Kosovo's independence. This is a violation of international law". After the 2014 Ukrainian revolution, the new Ukrainian government toughened its stance towards Abkhazia and South Ossetia (like Transnistria). In 2018, Ukrainian ships forcefully intercepted Abkhaz ships in the Black Sea.
United Kingdom	Secretary of State for Foreign and Commonwealth Affairs David Miliband accused Russian President Dmitry Medvedev of "inflaming" the crisis. He said that "the announcement by President Medvedev that Russia will recognise South Ossetia and Abkhazia is unjustifiable and unacceptable. It will also not work. It is contrary to the principles of the peace agreement, which Russia recently agreed, and to recent Russian statements. It takes no account of the views of the hundreds of thousands of Georgians and others who have been forced to abandon their homes in the two territories. We fully support Georgia's independence and territorial integrity, which cannot be changed by decree from Moscow." He called on Russia to "abide by international law as the basis for resolving this crisis" and stated that he will assemble the "widest possible coalition against Russian aggression". British prime minister Gordon Brown urged the EU to review ties with Russia and that the group must intensify its support for Georgia and others who may face Russian aggression. Brown said the G7 should consider meeting more regularly, thus excluding Russia, which belongs to the G8. Brown commenting on the conflict in Georgia and Russia's recognition of the two breakaway regions said "My message to Russia is simple: if you want to be welcome at the top table of organisations such as the G8, OECD and WTO, you must accept that with rights and responsibilities". Brown said that Russia "cannot pick and choose which rules to adhere to."
United States	President George W. Bush condemned the actions taken by Russia and called on them to "reconsider this irresponsible decision." Bush then stated that in "accordance with United Nations Security Council Resolutions that remain in force, Abkhazia and South Ossetia are within the internationally recognised borders of Georgia, and they must remain so." Secretary of State Condoleezza Rice also said the decision made by Russia was "regrettable" and further stated that since "the United States is a permanent member of the Security Council this simply will be dead on arrival in the Security Council." United States President George W. Bush acknowledged the ceasefire accord brokered by the French president and President of the European Council, Nicolas Sarkozy. The accord was signed by Russian president Dmitry Medvedev on 12 August 2008 and by Georgian president Mikheil Saakashvili on 15 August 2008. President Bush stated that he would send Secretary of State Condoleezza Rice to Tbilisi to "convey America's unwavering support for Georgia's democratic government." He also called upon Russia to respect the sovereignty and territorial integrity of Georgia. The Russian government welcomed the support expressed by President Bush for the ceasefire accords but stated "[i]t is regrettable, however, that the American side continues to refuse to recognise the real cause of what happened, consisting in that the regime of Mikhail Saakashvili had in violation of all its international commitments unleashed the war against the South Ossetian people." United States Vice President Dick Cheney traveled to Georgia on 4 September 2008 to reassure Georgia's President Mikheil Saakashvili of the United States' "commitment to Georgia's territorial integrity." Vice President Dick Cheney went on to denounce Russia's actions calling them "an illegitimate, unilateral attempt to change [Georgia's] borders by force that has been universally condemned by the free world" and pledged that Georgia would become a member of NATO. United States Secretary of Defense Robert Gates said that "Russia's behavior over the past week has called into question the entire premise of that dialogue and has profound implications for our security relationship going forward, both bilaterally and with NATO." He further went on to say that if "Russia does not step back from its aggressive posture and actions in Georgia, the U.S.-Russian relationship could be adversely affected for years to come." In October 2009, State Secretary Hillary Clinton said that the United States would not recognise the independence of Abkhazia and South Ossetia. To help the conflict resolution in the Caucasus, the Cultural Affairs Officer at the U.S. Embassy in Tbilisi started an exchange program for Abkhaz university employees in 2018. The professors from Abkhazian State University visited the United States. They visited the Arizona State University, San Diego State University, Rutgers University, Virginia Tech, Pennsylvania State University, University of Maryland, College Park and the United States Department of Agriculture.[298]
Uzbekistan	As of 2020, Uzbekistan had not recognised Abkhazia. During the summer of 2020, due to the COVID-19 pandemic in Abkhazia, the Uzbek government wanted to evacuate several hundred guest workers from Abkhazia. Because the Uzbek government did not recognise Abkhazia, they negotiated with the Russian government to organise the evacuation.
Vietnam	In 2008, Ministry of Foreign Affairs Spokesman Le Dung publicly reiterated that Vietnam's "consistent policy is to promote peaceful resolution of international disputes in accordance with basic principles of international law and the United Nations Charter". In a non-public conversation, Phạm Bình Minh, then the Deputy Minister of Foreign Affairs, told Michael W. Michalak, the Ambassador of the United States to Vietnam, that Georgian President Saakashvili's decision to invade South Ossetia was the reason for the crisis and added that Russia's decision was "a direct consequence of the US-led movement to recognize Kosovo", which Vietnam had opposed. In 2022, the Vietnamese ambassador in Venezuela established a first official contact with the Abkhaz ambassador in that country.
Zimbabwe	In 2024, Zimbabwe voted against the Georgia resolution at the United Nations which would United Nations General Assembly adopted a resolution to reiterate the right of return of all displaced persons and refugees to Georgia's Abkhazia and Tskhinvali Region/South Ossetia and support Georgia's territorial integrity.

=== Other states ===
State	Position
Kosovo	President of Kosovo Fatmir Sejdiu said that Kosovo cannot serve as an example for Russia to recognise South Ossetia or Abkhazia. He said, "We have always stressed that Kosovo has special characteristics; that it is sui generis and it cannot be used as a precedent for other conflict zones, areas or regions". He did not comment on Russia's recognition of South Ossetia and Abkhazia, but said that Kosovo was "on the side of great world powers" on that issue.
Northern Cyprus	President of Northern Cyprus Mehmet Ali Talat said he respected the will of the people in South Ossetia and Abkhazia. A spokesman for Talat called for Moscow to review its policy on Cyprus and said there were lessons in the developments for the Greek Cypriots.
Palestine	Palestine has so far not recognised the independence of Abkhazia or South Ossetia. In 2015, Abdel Hafiz Nofal, the ambassador of the State of Palestine to the Russian Federation, met with Abkhaz foreign minister Viacheslav Chirikba and Igor Ahba, the Abkhaz ambassador to Russia. In 2022, Nofal met with Inal Ardzinba, who had become Abkhaz foreign minister in late 2021.
Sahrawi Arab Democratic Republic	On 29 September 2010 the SADR Minister for African Issues Mohamed Yeslem Beyssat said that his state "de facto recognises the independence of South Ossetia. Now we have to formalise relations de jure, including the establishment of diplomatic relations". However, the SADR ultimately did not recognize South Ossetia to avoid controversy.
Taiwan	The head of Republic of China's representative office in Russia Antonio Chen said on 10 November 2011 in an interview published in the Kommersant newspaper: "Taiwan is ready for trade-economic and cultural cooperation with Abkhazia and South Ossetia. But as far as their political recognition is concerned, a mutual exchange of opinions on this issue has not been held yet".

== Positions taken by intergovernmental organisations ==
Under international law, intergovernmental organisations do not themselves possess the legal capacity to recognise any state diplomatically; their member states do so individually. However, depending on the intergovernmental organisation's rules of internal governance and the positions of their member states, they may express positive or negative opinions as to declarations of independence, or choose to offer or withhold membership to a newly declared state.

International organisation	Position
United Nations	In April 2008, the United Nations Security Council unanimously passed Resolution 1808 that reaffirmed "the commitment of all Member States to the sovereignty, independence and territorial integrity of Georgia within its internationally recognised borders and supports all efforts by the United Nations and the Group of Friends of the Secretary-General, which are guided by their determination to promote a settlement of the Abkhaz–Georgian conflict only by peaceful means and within the framework of the Security Council resolutions." In August 2008, UN Secretary General Ban Ki-moon stated that "the question of recognition of states is a matter for sovereign states to decide. Today's developments may have wider implications for security and stability in the Caucasus. The secretary-general regrets that ongoing efforts to find a common solution on the way forward in the crisis in Georgia within the Security Council may be complicated". Michele Montas, a spokesperson for UN Secretary-General Ban Ki-moon, denied comparisons of Kosovo with the two regions and said, "I think that you should compare the two situations. The history of the two situations is different and this has been stressed several times". The president of the UN General Assembly, Miguel d'Escoto Brockmann of Nicaragua, sided with Russia in the course of this war, which led to criticism by Western diplomats.
Collective Security Treaty Organisation	The CSTO (ODKB) did not recognise South Ossetia and Abkhazia as independent states as, according to Medvedev, the member states will individually decide whether to recognise taking into account their own national interests. Secretary General Nikolai Bordyuzha stated at a press conference in Yerevan that the present situation is "driving Abkhazia and South Ossetia into the collective security system", and further stated his belief that "South Ossetia and Abkhazia can not successfully and steadily develop without [being part of] a collective security system, without the backing of other states."
Council of Europe	Former Secretary General Terry Davis said "The unilateral recognition of the independence of Abkhazia and South Ossetia by the Russian Federation violates the territorial integrity of a fellow Council of Europe member state. It jeopardises prospects for a negotiated settlement of the dispute about the future status of these two regions. Russia cannot have it both ways. In the past, Russia has strongly supported the principle of territorial integrity. The decision to recognise Abkhazia and South Ossetia must strike any objective observer as being inconsistent with this principle. The ultimate victim of this decision is the international credibility of the Russian Federation. The Russians cannot invoke international law only when they feel like it".
European Union	The EU leaders held an emergency summit on 1 September 2008, "strongly condemned" Russia's unilateral decision and recalled "that a peaceful and lasting solution to the conflict in Georgia must be based on full respect for the principles of independence, sovereignty and territorial integrity recognised by international law, the Final Act of the Helsinki Conference on Security and Cooperation in Europe and United Nations Security Council resolutions." They also called on other states not to recognise this proclaimed independence and asked the European Commission to examine the practical consequences to be drawn. Swedish Foreign Secretary and Chairman of the Committee of Ministers of the Council of Europe, Carl Bildt, said that the Russian position is "certainly just as unacceptable" as Nazi Germany "defending its rights" in Sudetenland in 1938. Minister-Counsellor and Acting Head of Mission of the Russian embassy in Stockholm, Mikhail Skupov, condemned this statement as "not objective and unfortunate" and wished Sweden had a more objective and "constructive" stance, since Russia "has not annexed anything". French and UK foreign ministers have voiced fears that Russia may be planning scenarios similar to those that occurred in Georgia in countries traditionally regarded by Russia as being in its sphere of influence,[320] directly bordering the EU, such as Moldova and Ukraine. Their fears are prompted by rising tension between Ukraine and Russia, and fresh calls for independence from Moldova by separatists in the breakaway region of Transnistria.[321] Sergei Lavrov stated "I think it's a manifestation of the complete embarrassment at the fact that the favourite pet of Western capitals... didn't justify their hopes" and said that comments from Bernard Kouchner suggesting Russia has plans for Moldova and Ukraine, is a "sick fantasy".[322] Lavrov is under sanctions from the US, UK, EU, Canada, and Australia for his role in the 2022 Russian invasion of Ukraine.[323][324]
G7	On 27 August 2008, the seven foreign ministers of the G7 member states – Canada, France, Germany, Italy, Japan, the United States and the United Kingdom – issued a Joint Statement on Georgia, condemning the action of a fellow G8 member. The statement said, "Russia's decision has called into question its commitment to peace and security in the Caucasus." The Russian Ministry of Foreign Affairs responded stating that the statement justified Georgia's aggression and dismissed claims that Russia violated the territorial integrity of Georgia. Furthermore, the Ministry stated that Russia has complied with the Sarkozy-Medvedev peace plan and that Russian actions have prevented further destabilisation in the Caucasus region.
NATO	Secretary General Jaap de Hoop Scheffer said "this is in direct violation of numerous UN Security Council resolutions regarding Georgia's territorial integrity, resolutions that Russia itself has endorsed. Russia's actions in recent weeks call into question Russia's commitment to peace and security in the Caucasus. NATO firmly supports the sovereignty and territorial integrity of Georgia and calls on Russia to respect these principles". In December 2009, following NATO summit it was announced that NATO member states will not recognise Abkhazia and South Ossetia and called on Russia to reverse its decision.
Organisation for Security and Co-operation in Europe (OSCE)	OSCE chairman-in-Office, Finnish foreign minister Alexander Stubb said "the recognition of independence for South Ossetia and Abkhazia violates fundamental OSCE principles. As all OSCE participating States, Russia is committed to respecting the sovereignty and territorial integrity of others". On 9 July 2012, the OSCE Parliamentary Assembly passed a resolution at its annual session in Monaco, underlining Georgia's territorial integrity and referring to breakaway Abkhazia and South Ossetia as "occupied territories". The resolution "urges the Government and the Parliament of the Russian Federation, as well as the de facto authorities of Abkhazia, Georgia and South Ossetia, Georgia, to allow the European Union Monitoring Mission unimpeded access to the occupied territories." It also says that the OSCE Parliamentary Assembly is "concerned about the humanitarian situation of the displaced persons both in Georgia and in the occupied territories of Abkhazia, Georgia and South Ossetia, Georgia, as well as the denial of the right of return to their places of living." The Assembly is the parliamentary dimension of the OSCE with 320 lawmakers from the organisation's 56 participating states, including Russia.[330]
Shanghai Cooperation Organisation	According to different sources it seems disputed that Russia has gained global support from the member states in the Shanghai Cooperation Organisation (SCO). The Hindu reported that Russia has gained crucial support from the People's Republic of China and other member states in the Shanghai Cooperation Organisation. Xinhua News Agency reported that a joint declaration was issued at 28 August 2008 SCO Dushanbe summit and signed by the leaders of all six full members, most notably Russian President Dmitry Medvedev. The communique denounces force as a means to solve international problems, expressed concern over the tense situation, and called upon all parties to solve the ongoing South Ossetia conflict through peaceful dialogue. The heads have agreed to the six-point plan which was established in Moscow (12 August) and have expressed support to Russia. Western sources added that the SCO called for respect for every country's territorial integrity, stating, "The participants [of the SCO summit] underscore the need for respect of the historical and cultural traditions of each country and each people, for efforts aimed at the preservation, under international law, of the unity of a state and its territorial integrity". On 29 August 2008, Western and some Russian sources confirmed that the SCO Group "refused to back Moscow in its conflict with Georgia, and to support Moscow's recognition of South Ossetia and Abkhazia".
Union of Russia and Belarus	On 10 February 2022, the new Abkhaz foreign minister Inal Ardzinba met with State Secretary of the Union State of Russia and Belarus Dmitry Mezentsev. They both discussed integration processes in the post-Soviet space. In March 2022, they met again. In October 2022, according to the online publication Abkhazia Post, the foreign ministries of Abkhazia, Belarus and Russia established a trilateral forum of consultations on questions about the Union State.

== Positions taken by non-state actors ==
=== Regions with independent governments ===
Entity	Position
Hamas (government in Gaza Strip)	On 26 August 2008 a spokesman for the Palestinian group Hamas, which governs the Gaza Strip, welcomed the diplomatic recognition of Abkhazia and South Ossetia. He said that there were similarities between the situations of the Abkhazian, South Ossetian peoples, and the Palestinian people. The spokesman said, "We, Palestinians, also struggle to attain recognition for our rights, the main of which is the right to be an independent state. We hope that the decision of Moscow becomes the beginning of recognition of peoples which combat for freedom and justice".
Yemen – Supreme Political Council (government in part of Yemen)	The internationally recognised government of Yemen has not recognised either Abkhazia or South Ossetia. Nevertheless, Abdullah Ali Sabri, the Ambassador Extraordinary and Plenipotentiary of the Houthi-dominated Supreme Political Council government of the Republic of Yemen in Damascus, met with the Abkhaz ambassador in Syria in 2021. Both representatives exchanged views on possible areas of bilateral cooperation between the Republic of Abkhazia and the Islamic Republic of Yemen as well as the strengthening of relations between both parties.

=== International non-governmental organisations ===
International organisation	Position
Unrepresented Nations and Peoples Organization (UNPO)	The Hague-based Unrepresented Nations and Peoples Organization, whose members are 69 entities seeking self-determination and representation, of which Abkhazia (but not South Ossetia) is one, issued a statement on 29 August 2008 in which it "congratulates Abkhazia, for her calls for self-determination have been formally taken into consideration. With Abkhazia's right to self-determination acknowledged starts a long and slow process which can eventually lead to the admittance of Abkhazia to the United Nations".
International Organization for Standardization (ISO)	Neither Abkhazia nor South Ossetia is currently a member of the governing structures for the International Organization for Standardization (ISO). Independently of their ISO membership status, ISO may issue a standardized country code for each if certain criteria are met. According to rules of procedure followed by the ISO 3166 Maintenance Agency based in Geneva, a new ISO 3166-1 code for Abkhazia and/or South Ossetia will only be issued once it appears in the United Nations Terminology Bulletin Country Names or in the UN Statistics Division's list of Country and Region Codes for Statistical Use. To appear in the terminology bulletin, it must either (a) be admitted into the United Nations, (b) join a UN Specialised Agency or (c) become a state party to the Statute of the International Court of Justice. None of these criteria have been met.
Internet Corporation for Assigned Names and Numbers (ICANN)	ICANN, through its Country Code Names Supporting Organization, is responsible for adding new country code top-level domains (ccTLDs) for use in Internet addressing. Rules of procedure dictate Abkhazia and/or South Ossetia must first receive an ISO 3166-1 code (discussed above) before the ccTLD can be introduced.

== See also ==
- International reaction to the Russo-Georgian War
- International reactions to the annexation of Crimea by the Russian Federation
- International recognition of the Donetsk People's Republic and the Luhansk People's Republic
- List of states with limited recognition
- 2006 South Ossetian independence referendum
- Proposed Russian annexation of South Ossetia

== Sources ==
- Ramírez-Gastón Lecca, Fernando (6 November 2018). La Toma de Decisiones del Perú en las Naciones Unidas Frente a las intervenciones armadas rusas en Abjasia (Thesis). Academia Diplomática del Perú Javier Pérez de Cuéllar.
