= Foreign relations of South Ossetia =

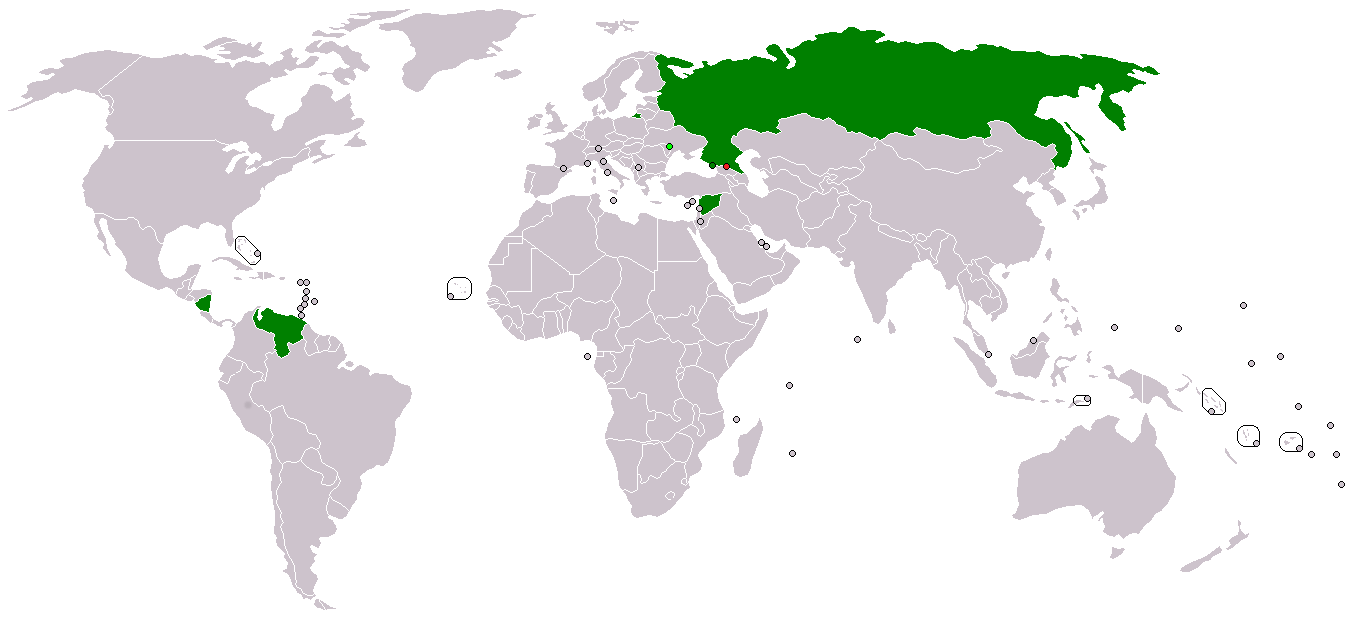
Foreign relations of South Ossetia diplomatic relations and recognition diplomatic recognition only

The Republic of South Ossetia – the State of Alania is a partially recognized state in the South Caucasus that declared independence from Georgia during the South Ossetia War of 1991–92. At the time, the Soviet Union had only just recently collapsed in 1991. Since 1991, South Ossetia has sought recognition as a sovereign state from the international community. South Ossetia is considered by most of the international community to be a part of Georgia.

South Ossetia maintains relations with 4 United Nations member states and 3 other partially recognized states. These include: Russia, Nicaragua, Syria, Venezuela, Abkhazia (also claimed by Georgia), and Transnistria (claimed by Moldova). South Ossetia was central to the Russo-Georgian War (12 days in August 2008), alongside Abkhazia. Shortly after the war, Russia recognized South Ossetia (26 August 2008), the first UN member state to do so.

The Donetsk People's Republic and the Luhansk People's Republic arranged mutual recognition with South Ossetia in 2014, but they were annexed by Russia on 30 September 2022.

== Relations with sovereign states ==
Country	Date of recognition	Notes
Iran	—N/a	In July 2019, the South Ossetian Minister of Foreign Affairs Dmitry Medoyev said that his country is willing to expand its cooperation with Iran. There are "deep-rooted economic, scientific and cultural ties between Iran and South Ossetian" he added.
Nauru	December 2009–July 2026	In December 2009, Nauru recognized the independence of South Ossetia. Nauru's foreign minister, Kieren Keke, visited Tskhinvali that year. In 2012, the South Ossetian Independence Day celebrations were attended by President Sprent Dabwido, who delivered a speech at the ceremony. In 2018, a South Ossetian delegation visited Nauru and the country's foreign ministry appointed a New Zealander as a representative in Nauru. However, the government of David Adeang revoked the diplomatic relations with Abkhazia and South Ossetia on 21 July 2026. On 30 July 2026, Nauru formally withdrew its recognition of Abkhazia and South Ossetia as independent states.
Nicaragua	5 September 2008	Main article: Nicaragua–South Ossetia relations On 5 September 2008, Nicaragua became the second UN member state to recognize South Ossetia.
Russia	26 August 2008	Main article: Russia–South Ossetia relations On 26 August 2008, Russia became the first UN member state to recognize South Ossetia. Russia plans on building an embassy in Tskhinvali. South Ossetia has an embassy in Moscow.
Syria	29 May 2018	On 29 May 2018, Syria became the latest UN member state to recognize South Ossetia. On 22 July 2018, during the state visit of President Anatoly Bibilov to Damascus, South Ossetia and Syria have signed an agreement on establishing diplomatic ties.
Turkey	—N/a	South Ossetia and Turkey have no official relations. In 2019, South Ossetia named a representative for Turkey. In 2020, the representative died. Around 50,000 Ossetians live in Turkey.
Tuvalu	19 September 2011–31 March 2014	In 2011, the government of Prime Minister Willy Telavi recognized Abkhazia and South Ossetia. However, the government of Prime Minister Enele Sopoaga retracted the recognition of Abkhazia and South Ossetia on 31 March 2014 when Tuvalu's Foreign Minister Taukelina Finikaso signed an agreement to establish diplomatic relations with Georgia. Tuvalu's Foreign Minister said that his country supports Georgia's territorial integrity in its international recognized borders.
Venezuela	10 September 2009	Main article: South Ossetia–Venezuela relations On 10 September 2009, Venezuela became the third UN member state to recognize South Ossetia.

== Relations with partially recognized states ==
Country	Date of recognition	Notes
Abkhazia	19 September 2005 or before (Note: The date when Abkhazia, South Ossetia and Transnistria recognize each other is not clear. Abkhazia and Transnistria signed a Treaty on Friendship and Cooperation on 22 January 1993, South Ossetia and Transnistria a Treaty on Friendship and Cooperation on 12 October 1994 and Abkhazia and South Ossetia a Treaty on Friendship and Cooperation on 19 September 2005.)	Main article: Abkhazia–South Ossetia relations Abkhazia and South Ossetia recognized each other's independence on 19 September 2005 or before. Abkhazia has an embassy in Tskhinvali.
Transnistria	12 October 1994 or before	Representative offices of Transnistria in Abkhazia and South Ossetia have been opened. Representative offices of Abkhazia and South Ossetia in Tiraspol have been opened.

== Relations with former partially recognized states ==
Country	Date of recognition	Notes
Artsakh	17 November 2006–1 January 2024	Artsakh, Abkhazia and South Ossetia mutually recognized each other. Artsakh would cease to exist following an Azerbaijani offensive in 2023.
Donetsk People's Republic	13 May 2015–30 September 2022	Main article: Donetsk People's Republic–South Ossetia relations South Ossetia recognized Donetsk People's Republic on 27 June 2014. Donetsk People's Republic recognized South Ossetia on 13 May 2015. The DPR was annexed by Russia on 30 September 2022. The annexation is internationally unrecognized.
Luhansk People's Republic	28 January 2015–30 September 2022	After receiving diplomatic recognition from South Ossetia in 2014, the Luhansk People's Republic reciprocated recognition on 28 January 2015. In April 2015, South Ossetia opened the first foreign embassy in Luhansk. The LPR was annexed by Russia on 30 September 2022. The annexation is internationally unrecognized.

== Membership in international organizations ==
As of March 2009, South Ossetia is a member of one international organization, the Community for Democracy and Human Rights.

== See also ==
- Foreign relations of Abkhazia
