= South Ossetia–Transnistria relations =

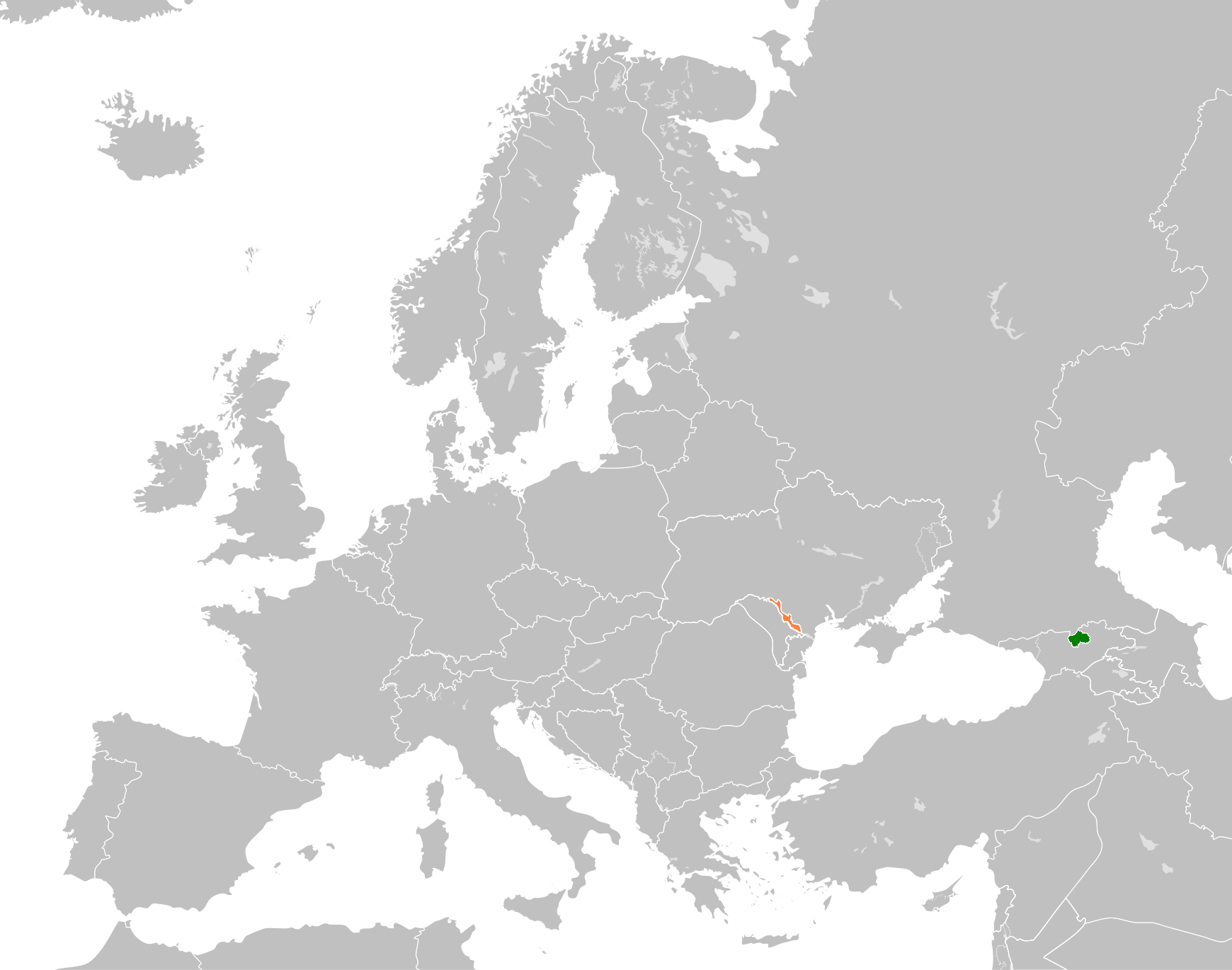

- South Ossetia: Transnistria

South Ossetia–Transnistria relations is the bilateral relationship between South Ossetia (officially the Republic of South Ossetia – the State of Alania) and the Pridnestrovian Moldovan Republic (Transnistria). South Ossetia is recognized by five United Nations member states and Transnistria by none. The bilateral relations are mostly symbolic.

== History ==
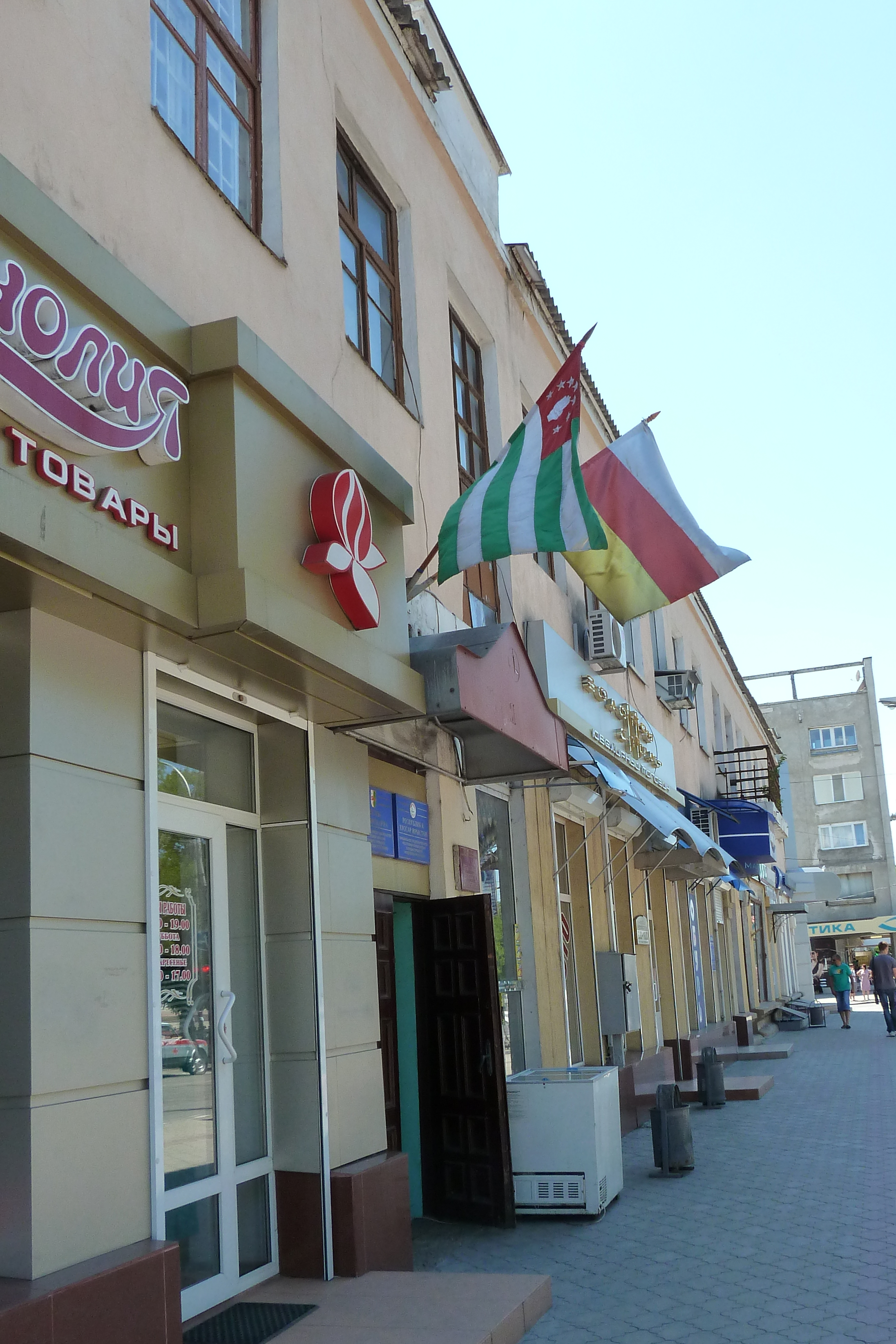
The Representative Office of Abkhazia and Consulate of South Ossetia in Tiraspol

In the course of the 1990s, both states recognized each other. During the reign of Igor Smirnov in Transnistria (1991–2011) both states developed close relations. In 2006, representatives of both states signed a Treaty on Friendship, Cooperation, and Mutual Support as well as a Declaration on the Creation of a Community for Democracy and Rights of Nations. In 2012, representatives of the Armed Forces of South Ossetia signed a cooperation agreement with representatives of the Armed Forces of Transnistria and the Abkhazian Armed Forces in Sukhumi. The treaty aimed for strengthening the military security, the mutual provision of information about the challenges and threats to national security, territorial integrity and sovereignty.

Regularly, representatives of both states visit the other states. South Ossetia has an embassy in Tiraspol and Transnistria a Representation Office in Tskhinvali. Regularly, both states Ministries of Foreign Affairs exchange diplomatic notes.

== See also ==
- Foreign relations of South Ossetia
- Foreign relations of Transnistria
- Community for Democracy and Rights of Nations
