= Abkhazia–Tuvalu relations =

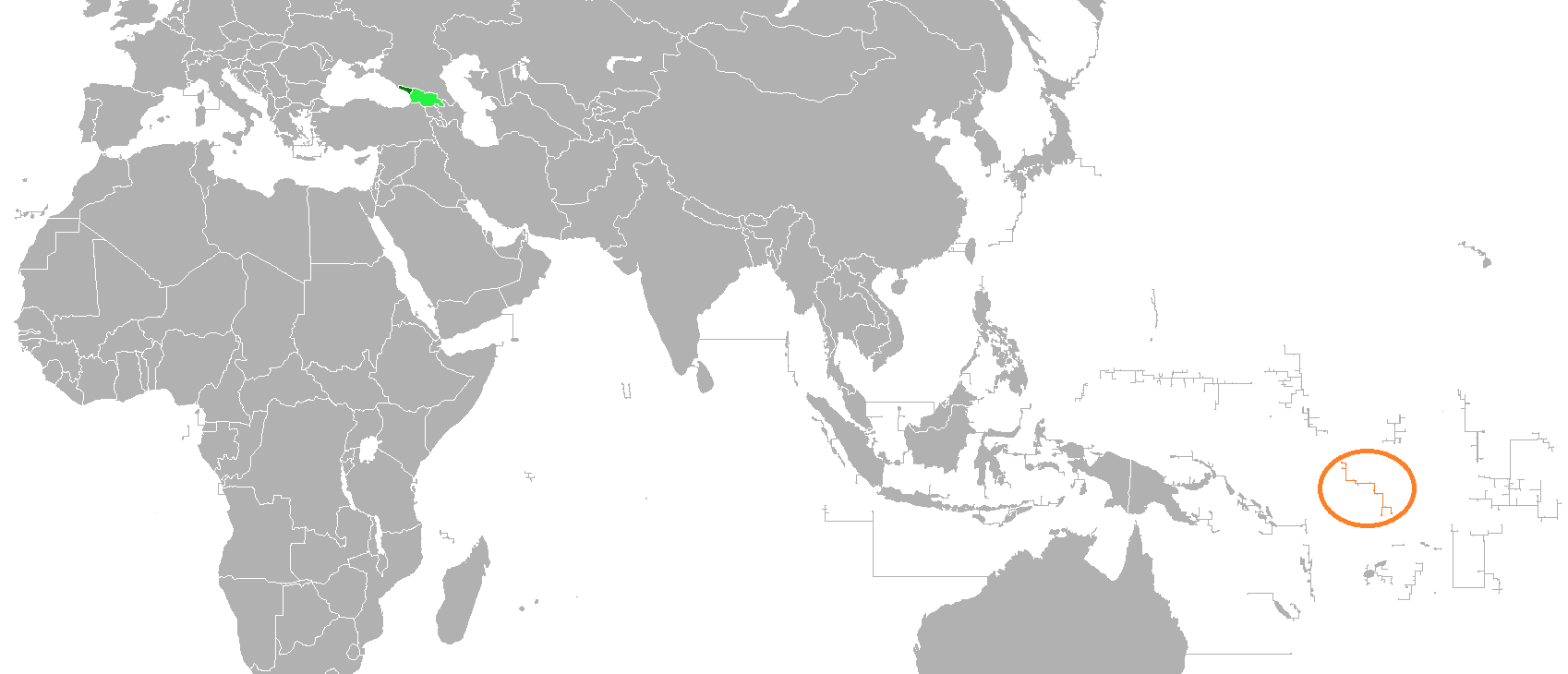

- Abkhazia: Tuvalu

Abkhazia–Tuvalu relations refers to bilateral relations between the Republic of Abkhazia and Tuvalu. Tuvalu recognised Abkhazia's independence on 18 September 2011. Tuvalu has since withdrawn its recognition on 31 May 2014 and has established diplomatic ties with Georgia.

== History ==
On 18 September 2011, the Prime Minister of Abkhazia Sergei Shamba and the Prime Minister of Tuvalu Willy Telavi signed a joint statement on the establishment of diplomatic relations in Sukhumi.

In October 2011, Tuvalu and Abkhazia established official relations. However, foreign affairs expert Juris Gulbis pointed out that, Abkhazia relies on financial aid from Russia and is unable to use subsequent money to support Tuvalu. In April 2013, Tuvalu hinted that they might follow Vanuatu's lead and end diplomatic support of Abkhazia in favour of diplomatic ties with Georgia. Tuvaluan officials contacted Gulbis to say that Georgia had offered $250,000 for the exchange.

Georgia had offered $250,000, and could Abkhazia beat that?

[Abkhazia] does not even have the money to refurbish the toilets in the foreign affairs office, let alone to give millions of dollars to countries that we want to recognise us,

In 2013, Tuvalu changed its government. The new prime minister Enele Sopoaga began active negotiations with Georgia after being elected.

On 31 March 2014, in Tbilisi, Georgia and Tuvalu established diplomatic and consular relations. Tuvalu stated that they recognised the territorial integrity of Georgia within its internationally recognised borders and that Abkhazia and South Ossetia are Georgian regions. Tuvalu reaffirmed its belief in Georgia's sovereignty and territorial integrity, as well as its respect for the principles of international law. Thus, Tuvalu revoked its 2011 agreement with Abkhazia and formally ended diplomatic ties.
