= Nicaragua–South Ossetia relations =

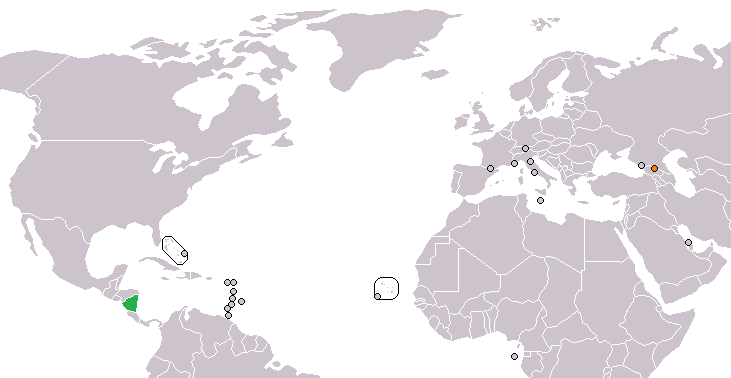

- Nicaragua: South Ossetia

Bilateral foreign relations between Nicaragua and the Republic of South Ossetia began on 5 September 2008, when Nicaragua extended diplomatic recognition to South Ossetia.

At a press conference in November 2008, Nicaraguan Foreign Minister Samuel Santos Lopez said, "Certainly, we think that the decision [to recognize independent Abkhazia and South Ossetia] was fair and appropriate. They [the republics] must be given time for inner formalities. We will coordinate the possibility and terms of direct diplomatic relations at a convenient moment. Obviously and logically, we will be acting via our friends, probably Russia, to establish closer contacts and diplomatic relations [with the republics]."

The recognition of South Ossetia by Nicaragua triggered immediate reactions from other countries involved in the dispute over the status of South Ossetia. Georgia responded to Nicaragua's concurrent recognition of Abkhazia and South Ossetia by cutting diplomatic relations with the Central American state at the end of November 2008. Russia offered to strengthen ties with Nicaragua and to provide aid to Nicaragua to help rebuild areas damaged by hurricanes. The U.S. Secretary of Commerce canceled a planned trip to Nicaragua, with the U.S. Ambassador in Managua saying, "It isn't the appropriate moment for the visit."

After succeeding Eduard Kokoity as President of South Ossetia, Leonid Tibilov dismissed Nariman Kozaev as Ambassador on 25 July 2012.

Ten years after the recognition, the relations remained largely symbolic.

== See also ==
- Foreign relations of Nicaragua
- Foreign relations of South Ossetia
- Abkhazia–Nicaragua relations
