= Foreign relations of Abkhazia =

The Republic of Abkhazia is a partially recognized state in the South Caucasus which declared independence from Georgia during the War in Abkhazia of 1992–93). At the time, the Soviet Union had recently collapsed in 1991.

Since 1992, Abkhazia has sought recognition as a sovereign state from the international community. Abkhazia is still considered by most countries to be part of Georgia. Abkhazia maintains relations with four United Nations member states and two other partially recognized states.

== Relations with sovereign states and partially recognized states ==
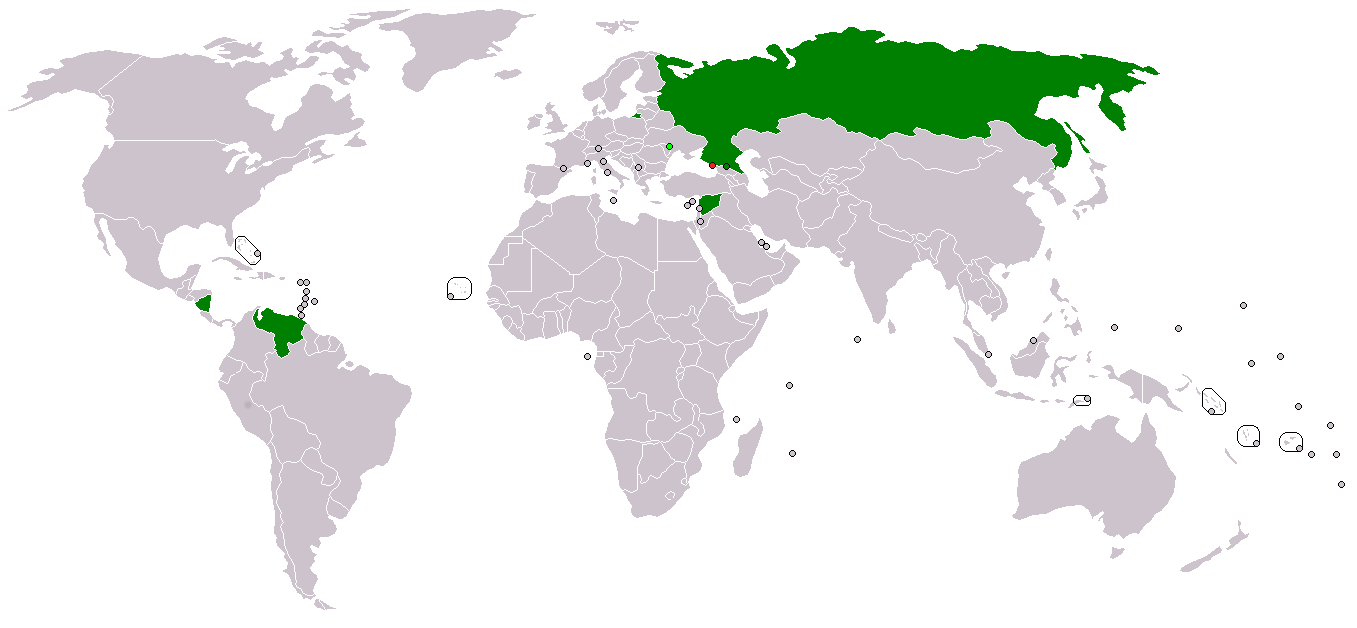
Foreign relations of Abkhazia diplomatic relations and recognition diplomatic recognition only

Abkhazia was central to the Russo-Georgian War alongside South Ossetia. Shortly after the war on 26 August 2008, Russia recognized the independence of Abkhazia, the first UN member state to do so.

Since then, Abkhazia has obtained and retains recognition from three other UN member states: Nicaragua (5 September 2008), Venezuela (10 September 2009), and Syria (31 May 2018). Transnistria – which is claimed by Moldova, recognized Abkhazia on 22 January 1993. Abkhazia arranged mutual recognitions with South Ossetia on 20 September 2005, territory also claimed by Georgia.

Abkhazia has also obtained recognition from states that have since revoked this. These include Vanuatu (2011–2013), Tuvalu (2011–2014) and Nauru (2009–2026). Abkhazia maintains unofficial contacts in several other countries, including Belarus (2008, 2009, 2020), Italy (2011), San Marino (2011), Eritrea (2014), North Korea (2017, 2018), Iran (2021), Yemen (2021) and Northern Cyprus (2008) (claimed by Cyprus).

State	Date of diplomatic recognition	Diplomatic relations established	Notes
Nicaragua	5 September 2008	10 September 2009	Main article: Abkhazia–Nicaragua relations On September 5, 2008, Nicaragua became the second UN member state to recognize Abkhazia. Abkhazia has a non-resident embassy in Caracas and Nicaragua has a non-resident embassy in Moscow. In 2011, the government of Abkhazia appointed an honorary consul for the Nicaraguan side. Respectively in 2020, the Nicaraguan government appointed an honorary consul for the Abkhazian side.
Russia	26 August 2008	9 September 2008	Main article: Abkhazia–Russia relations On August 26, 2008, Russia became the first UN member state to recognize Abkhazia. Russian Federation has resident embassy with Plenipotentiary and Extraordinary Ambassador residing in Sukhumi. Abkhazia has a resident embassy with a Plenipotentiary and Extraordinary Ambassador residing in Moscow.
South Ossetia	19 September 2005 (Note: The date, when Abkhazia, South Ossetia and Transnistria recognize each other is not clear. Abkhazia and Transnistria signed a Treaty on Friendship and Cooperation on 22 January 1993, South Ossetia and Transnistria a Treaty on Friendship and Cooperation on 12 October 1994 and Abkhazia and South Ossetia a Treaty on Friendship and Cooperation on 19 September 2005.)	26 September 2007	Main article: Abkhazia–South Ossetia relations Abkhazia and South Ossetia officially recognized each other's independence on 19 September 2005. Abkhazia has a resident embassy with an Ambassador residing in Tskhinvali and South Ossetia has a resident embassy with an Ambassador residing in Sukhumi.
Syria	29 May 2018	4 September 2018	Main article: Abkhazia–Syria relations On May 29, 2018, Syria became the fifth UN Member state to recognize Abkhazia. Prior to this, Abkhazia and Syria had various formal and informal diplomatic meetings. Abkhazia and Syria reported that they would open embassies and exchange Plenipotentiary and Extraordinary Ambassadors to Sukhumi and Damascus. In October 2020, the Abkhaz embassy in Damascus opened. Abkhazian diplomatic personnel were withdrawn from Syria on 15 December 2024 following the fall of the al-Assad regime. The transitional government of Syria has continued to recognize Abkhazia.
Transnistria	22 January 1993 or before	22 January 1993	Main article: Abkhazia–Transnistria relations Abkhazia and Transnistria officially recognized each other's independence. Abkhazia has a representative office with Plenipotentiary Representative in Tiraspol and Transnistria has a representative office with Plenipotentiary Representative in Sukhumi.
Venezuela	10 September 2009	23 July 2010	Main article: Abkhazia–Venezuela relations On September 10, 2009, Venezuela became the third UN member state to recognize Abkhazia. Abkhazia has an embassy with a resident Ambassador in Caracas since 2010 and Venezuela has a non-resident embassy with an Ambassador residing in Moscow.

== Relations with subnational entities ==
The Donetsk People's Republic and the Luhansk People's Republic arranged mutual recognition with Abkhazia in early 2022, but were annexed by Russia on 30 September 2022.

State	Date of diplomatic recognition	Diplomatic relations established	Notes
Donetsk People's Republic Luhansk People's Republic	25 February 2022		Donetsk and Luhansk recognized Abkhazia in 2015, however Abkhazia did not recognize them at that time. On 22 February 2022, the Ministry of Foreign Affairs published a statement welcoming the recognition of the independence of the Donetsk and Luhansk People's Republics by Russian president Vladimir Putin. On 25 February 2022 President Aslan Bzhania announced the recognition of the Donetsk People's Republic and Luhansk People's Republic. The DPR and LPR were annexed by Russia on 30 September 2022. The annexations are internationally unrecognized.

== States that have withdrawn recognition ==
- Tuvalu - March 2014.
- Vanuatu - June 2011, reiterated in March 2013 and March 2019.
- Nauru - July 2026.

== Foreign policy ==
Though Abkhazia is recognized only by a small number of states, it still upholds unofficial relations with several UN member states. Often, the Circassian diaspora is used as a mean to establish links to states of the Middle East.

=== Belarus ===
According to the Deputy Prime Minister of Abkhazia, Kan Taniya, the Abkhaz relations to Belarus are high on the priority list of Abkhazia. In 1995, Belarus was opposed to the CIS sanctions against Abkhazia. Bilateral relations between Belarus and Georgia were strained during the Georgian Presidency of Mikheil Saakashvili, during which Abkhazia was recognised by Russia. In March 2009, President Lukashenko referred to Abkhaz president Sergey Bagapsh as "the President of Abkhazia" in an official statement when the two met in Moscow. The two discussed economic cooperation, with Lukashenko stating "much work emerges after gaining independence, we would be happy if Belarus' involvement could help to solve problems in this region." In November 2009, Belarusian lawmakers visited Tbilisi, Sukhumi, and Tskhinvali on simultaneous fact-finding missions to inform a decision on whether to recognise Abkhazia and South Ossetia. Despite these actions and Russian pressure, Belarus never recognised Abkhazia and South Ossetia. Bilateral relations between Belarus and Georgia improved over the same period, and in April 2015, during the Georgian Presidency of Giorgi Margvelashvili, Lukashenko paid his first official visit to Georgia, during which he explicitly noted his support of Georgia's territorial integrity. Since then, Georgia buys Belarus tractors "and other equipment that we would not otherwise buy", according to Georgian economist Paata Sheshelidze. In 2021, an OSCE expert guessed that Belarus might be one of the next countries to recognize Abkhazia.

=== Eritrea ===
In June 2014, the Ambassador Extraordinary and Plenipotentiary of the State of Eritrea in the Russian Federation Teklay Minassie Asgedom and Head of the Department of Asia and the Pacific of the Ministry of Foreign Affairs of the State of Eritrea Kalekristos Zariseney Gebreyezus met with a delegation from Abkhazia.

=== Israel ===
In 2004, Abkhazia asked Israel to recognize the country. Six years later, mutual visits became more frequent. In 2011, a delegation of the Israeli security firm Global CST visited Abkhazia. Representatives of Global CST declared their readiness to provide non-offensive military technologies, security equipment, and medicine, as well as invest into the agricultural sector, tourism, and mining. In 2017, Abkhaz foreign minister Daur Kove visited Israel and participated in an international round table "Status of the unrecognized states and their relations with Israel" which took place in Tel Aviv University on 8 November 2017. During his trip, Kove held a number of working meetings including with Alon Davidi, the mayor of Sderot and with Alexander Shane, the ambassador of the Russian Federation to Israel.

=== North Korea ===
In December 2017, the North Korean Chamber of Commerce contacted then-Abkhaz prime minister Gennadi Gagulia. Subsequently, an Abkhaz delegation visited Pyongyang (August 2018) and a North Korean delegation visited Sukhumi (November 2018). According to the Director of International Relations at the Chamber of Commerce of North Korea, companies of the construction business, the food and textile industry, logistics companies are interested in working with Abkhazia. Additionally, North Korean workers could be sent to the Black Sea country. In 2019, about 400 North Korean workers settled in Abkhazia. In 2021, an OSCE expert guessed that North Korea might be one of the next countries to recognize Abkhazia. Abkhazia rejects a diplomatic recognition by North Korea solely for geopolitical reasons.

=== Turkey ===
The most cordial of the Abkhaz relations with UN member states without official diplomatic recognition are with Turkey. Turkey does not follow the Georgian embargo rules and the country hosts a large Abkhaz diaspora.

=== United States ===
The United States does not recognize Abkhazia as an independent state and considers it an integral part of Georgia. U.S. officials have called on Russia to reverse its recognition of Abkhazia and to comply with the terms of the 2008 ceasefire agreement. In 2011 the U.S. Senate passed a resolution affirming support for Georgia’s territorial integrity and recognizing Abkhazia as a region “occupied by the Russian Federation”.

In 2008, the United States government of George W. Bush informally tried to establish contacts with the Abkhaz government.

=== Partially recognized states ===
The Sahrawi Arab Democratic Republic, and the Turkish Republic of Northern Cyprus welcomed Russian recognition of Abkhazia.

In 2007, members of the parliaments and civil society organizations from Northern Cyprus and Western Sahara observed the Abkhazian parliamentary election.

=== Issues regarding Visas ===
Several states that do not recognize Abkhazia routinely refuse visa applications of Abkhazians, even though the application is made in Moscow on the basis of the person's dual Russian citizenship.

In October 2006, the American embassy denied a visa to Minister for Foreign Affairs of Abkhazia Sergei Shamba, who was to attend a UN Security Council discussion in New York City on the United Nations Observer Mission in Georgia.

In February 2009 the Indian embassy denied visas to two Abkhazian women employed by the Ministry of Foreign Affairs who had been invited by the Jawaharlal Nehru University to attend an international conference. In response, Foreign Minister Shamba sent letters to Indian External Affairs Minister Pranab Mukherjee and to the ambassador of India to Russia, Prabhat Prakash Shukla. The letters protested the very hostile attitude towards Abkhazia and pointed out that the applicants’ Russian citizenship had not been taken into account, and warned that Abkhazia might respond by denying visas to any future Indian visitors.

On 17 March 2009 the Spanish embassy in Moscow refused visas for the members of the Abkhazian Futsal team, which was to take part in the first Copa de les Nacions de Futsal in Catalonia.

== Membership in international organizations ==
Abkhazia belongs to the Unrepresented Nations and Peoples Organization (UNPO) and Community for Democracy and Human Rights.

=== Cooperation with international organizations ===
In 2012, the Abkhaz foreign minister signed a Memorandum of Understanding with a representative of Bolivarian Alliance for the Peoples of Our America – Peoples' Trade Treaty.

== International economic relations ==
The National Bank of the Republic of Abkhazia has maintained its baseline interest rate for 11 years. Debt is negligible, external liabilities are just 5.6 per cent of GDP, and Abkhazia has never reported a balance of payments deficit.

== See also ==
- Foreign relations of South Ossetia
