= Abkhazia–Nauru relations =

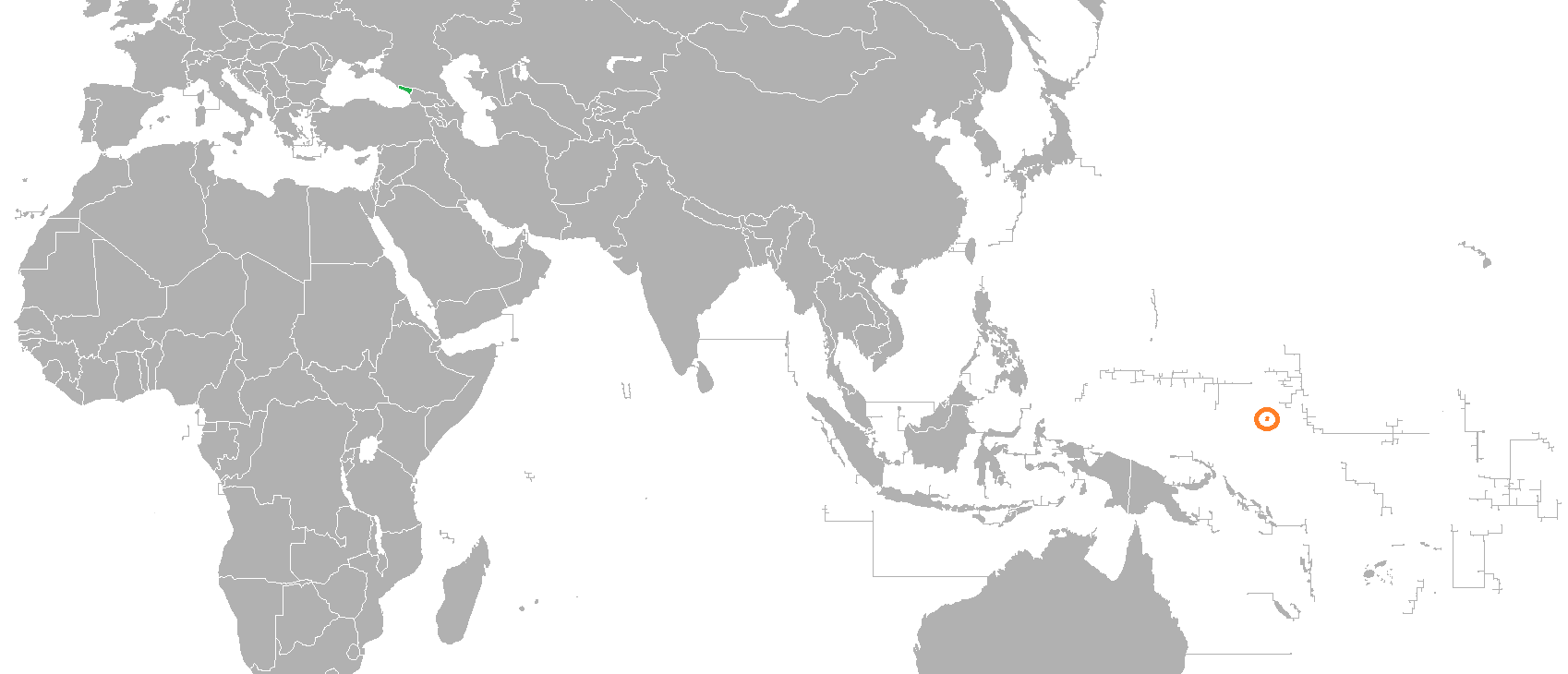

- Abkhazia: Nauru

Bilateral foreign relations were established between the Republic of Abkhazia and Nauru on 15 December 2009, in the aftermath of the 2008 Russo-Georgian War, which saw Abkhazia gain partial international recognition. On 21 July 2026, Nauru terminated diplomatic relations with Abkhazia "with immediate effect" before formally withdrawing its recognition of Abkhazia as an independent state on 30 July 2026.

== Recognition and diplomatic relations ==
Nauru became the fourth United Nations member to recognise and establish diplomatic relations with Abkhazia as an independent state on 15 December 2009. On 15 December 2009 a recognition agreement between the Minister of Foreign Affairs of Abkhazia, Sergei Shamba, and the Minister of Trade and Foreign Affairs of Nauru, Kieren Keke was signed.

Former President Sprent Dabwido claimed Nauru's recognition of Abkhazia was because the people "really need independence". On the other hand, observer Dr. Malakai Koloamatangi said that he believed Nauru recognised Abkhazia in order to gain financial support from Russia.

=== End of relations and recognition ===
On 21 July 2026, Nauru officially revoked diplomatic relations with both Abkhazia and South Ossetia "with immediate effect". On 30 July 2026, Nauru formally withdrew its recognition of Abkhazia and South Ossetia as independent states. Georgia welcomed the move, while the authorities in Abkhazia said they regretted what they described as a "forced decision".

== Meetings between officials ==
Representatives of Nauru were present as observers for the presidential elections in Abkhazia on 26 August 2011.

On 18 September 2012, Abkhazia's Ambassador to Russia Igor Akhba met with Nauru's President Sprent Dabwido when the latter visited Moscow and discussed future cooperation. On 7 November 2013, Akhba met in Moscow with Dabwido's successor Baron Waqa and discussed agreements to be signed between Abkhazia and Nauru.

On 22 August 2014, Nauru's Speaker of Parliament Ludwig Scotty was awarded the order Akhdz-Apsha second degree by Acting President Valeri Bganba.

Between 18 and 20 April 2015, a delegation from Nauru visited Abkhazia headed by Vice President David Adeang. It discussed the signing of three agreements on cooperation and the appointment of an honorary consul of Nauru in Abkhazia.

On 27-29 September 2015, Ludwig Scotty, the Speaker of Parliament of Nauru paid a visit to Abkhazia on the 23rd anniversary of Victory Day of Abkhazian War 1992–1993 in Sukhumi, Abkhazia.

On 29 September 2016, during a visit to Abkhazia of a delegation led by Nauru's Speaker of Parliament Cyril Buraman, the two countries signed a Treaty of Friendship and Cooperation.

After paid visit and meeting with the Foreign Minister of the Russian Federation, Sergei Lavrov in Sochi on 22 November 2017, H.E. Baron Waqa, then President of Nauru made a visit to Abkhazia on 22-23 November 2017. He was the first non-Russian head of state to visit the Republic of Abkhazia. Waqa and Khajimba issued had some important agenda's talks and discussed at this moment. Both nations agreed to increase mutual relationship in the higher level both of Republic of Nauru and the Republic of Abkhazia.

On the occasion of the fiftieth anniversary of the independence of Nauru on 31 January 2018, a delegation from Abkhazia (together with a delegation from South Ossetia) paid a visit on this occasion on 27 January–4 February 2018. There were several agenda talks from Abkhazia officials and Nauru officials. Minister of Foreign Affairs Abkhazia, Daur Kove meets with then-President Nauru, Baron Waqa. Several bilateral documents were signed between the Abkhaz Foreign Minister and the Government and Parliament of Nauru on 1 February 2018 between Said Kharazia and Cyril Buraman.
