= United Nations Security Council Resolution 1808 =

UN Security Council Resolution 1808
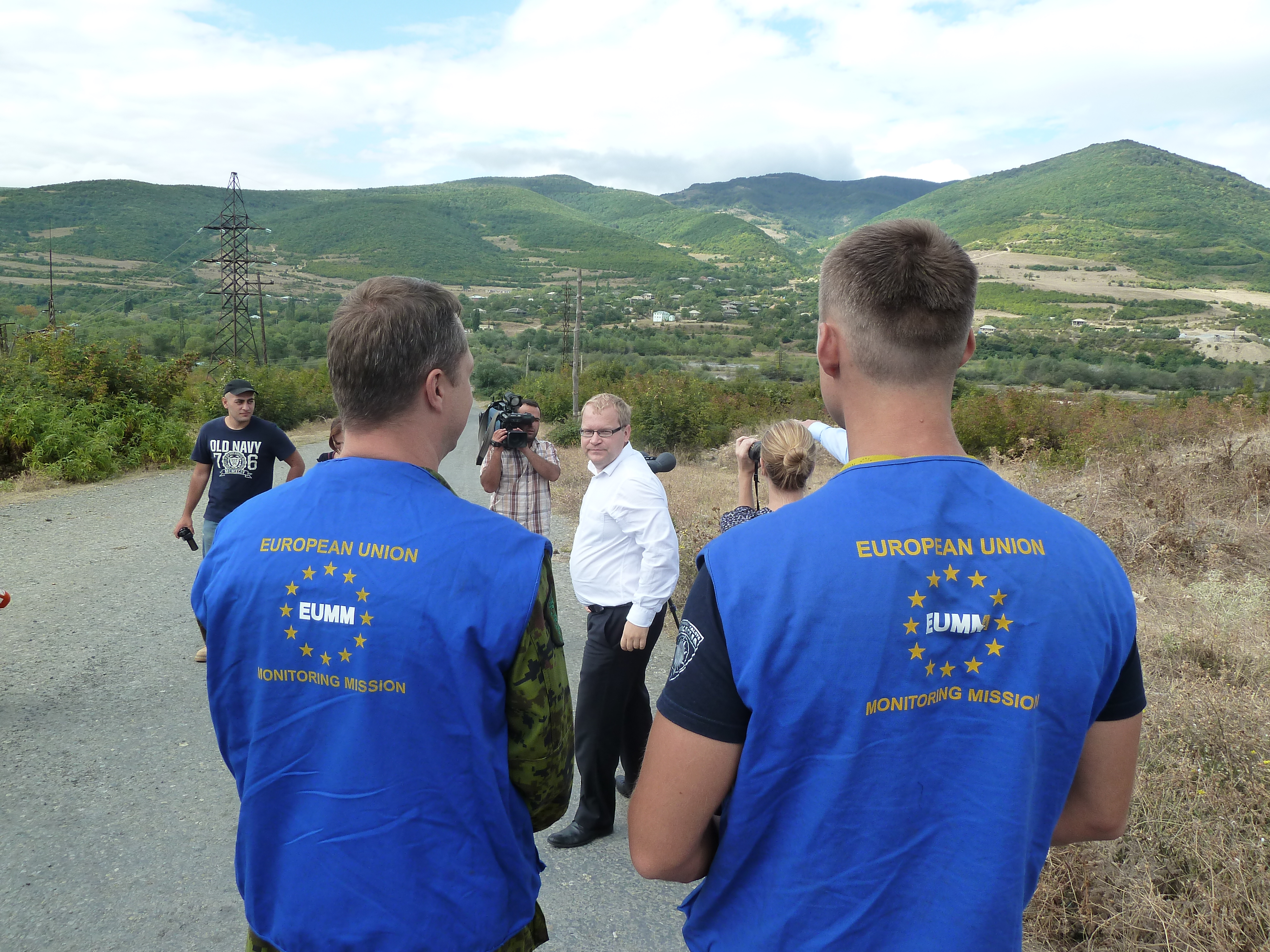
- European Union Monitoring Mission in Georgia
- Date: 15 April 2008
- Meeting no.: 5,866
- Code: S/RES/1808 (Document)
- Subject: The situation in Georgia
- Voting summary: 15 voted for; None voted against; None abstained
- Result: Adopted

Security Council composition
- Permanent members: China; France; Russia; United Kingdom; United States
- Non-permanent members: Burkina Faso; Belgium; Costa Rica; Croatia; Indonesia; Italy; Libya; Panama; South Africa; Vietnam

United Nations Security Council Resolution 1808 was passed unanimously by the United Nations Security Council on April 15, 2008. It sought to address the ongoing situation in Georgia, which had two breakaway de facto states within its borders, neither of which was recognised by the UN. The primary purpose was to extend the mandate of the United Nations Observer Mission in Georgia, which was mainly composed of Russian peacekeepers.

== After the 2008 War in Georgia ==
Many states, especially Luxembourg, claimed that during the 2008 South Ossetia war, Russia was in violation of this resolution, especially after its recognition of Abkhazia and South Ossetia. Abkhazia is now recognised by six UN member states and South Ossetia by five, respectively.
