= Abkhazia–South Ossetia relations =

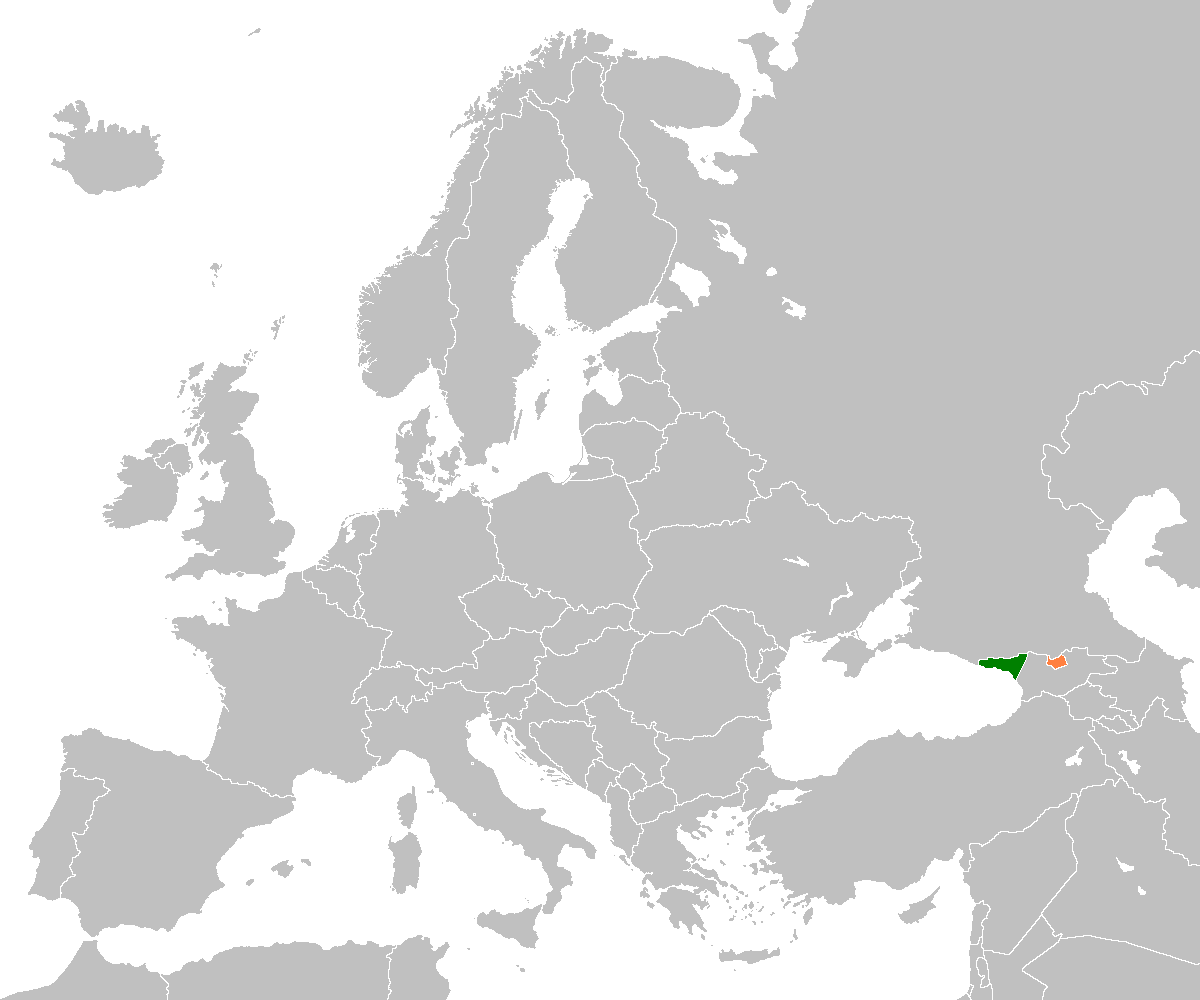

- Abkhazia: South Ossetia

Diplomatic relations between Abkhazia and South Ossetia, two partially recognized states which broke away from Georgia amidst the dissolution of the Soviet Union in the early 1990s, were established on 26 September 2007.

The governments of Abkhazia and South Ossetia have worked closely in their pursuit of international recognition. Leaders of Abkhazia and South Ossetia signed a mutual defense pact. During the 2008 Russo-Georgian war, Abkhazian soldiers and volunteers backed by Russian paratroopers drove Georgian troops from their last stronghold in Abkhazia's Kodori Valley while Russian and South Ossetian forces were engaged in heavy combat with Georgian forces.

On 19 September 2005, a day before the 15th anniversary of South Ossetia's independence, President Sergei Bagapsh of Abkhazia and President Eduard Kokoity of South Ossetia signed a treaty of friendship and cooperation in Tskhinvali. The treaty was ratified by South Ossetia's Parliament on 27 December and by Abkhazia's Parliament on 15 February 2006. On 20 September, Kokoity awarded Bagapsh with the Medal of Honour.

On 18 August 2015, Abkhazia and South Ossetia signed an agreement on visa-free travel during a visit by Abkhazia's Foreign Minister Viacheslav Chirikba to Tskhinvali. Both states are members of the Community for Democracy and Rights of Nations.

== Ambassadors ==
On 26 September 2007, South Ossetia's first ambassador to Abkhazia Robert Kokoity presented his credentials to Abkhazia's President Sergei Bagapsh. On 15 April 2008 South Ossetia's chancery in Abkhazia's capital Sukhumi was formally opened. On 10 December December 2010, President Kokoity accepted the credentials of Nodar Pliev, the ambassador of Abkhazia to South Ossetia. After succeeding Eduard Kokoity as President of South Ossetia, Leonid Tibilov dismissed Robert Kokoity as Ambassador on 25 July 2012. On 15 April 2013, Oleg Botsiev was appointed as his successor. On 19 August, Botsiev presented his credentials to Abkhazian Foreign Minister Viacheslav Chirikba, and on 20 August, to President Alexander Ankvab.

On 27 January 2014, President Ankvab recalled Nodar Pliev as ambassador to South Ossetia and appointed Alan Elbakiev as his successor. Elbakiev received his credentials on 7 February and presented them to President Leonid Tibilov of South Ossetia on 28 February.

In August 2015, Abkhazia's chancery in Tskhinvali was officially inaugurated.

== See also ==
- Foreign relations of Abkhazia
- Foreign relations of South Ossetia
