= Abkhazia–Transnistria relations =

- Abkhazia: Transnistria

Abkhazia–Transnistria relations is the bilateral relationship between the Pridnestrovian Moldovan Republic and the Republic of Abkhazia, two mostly unrecognized states in Eastern Europe. Both states recognize the independence of each other.

Abkhazia and Transnistria signed a treaty of friendship and cooperation on 22 January 1993.

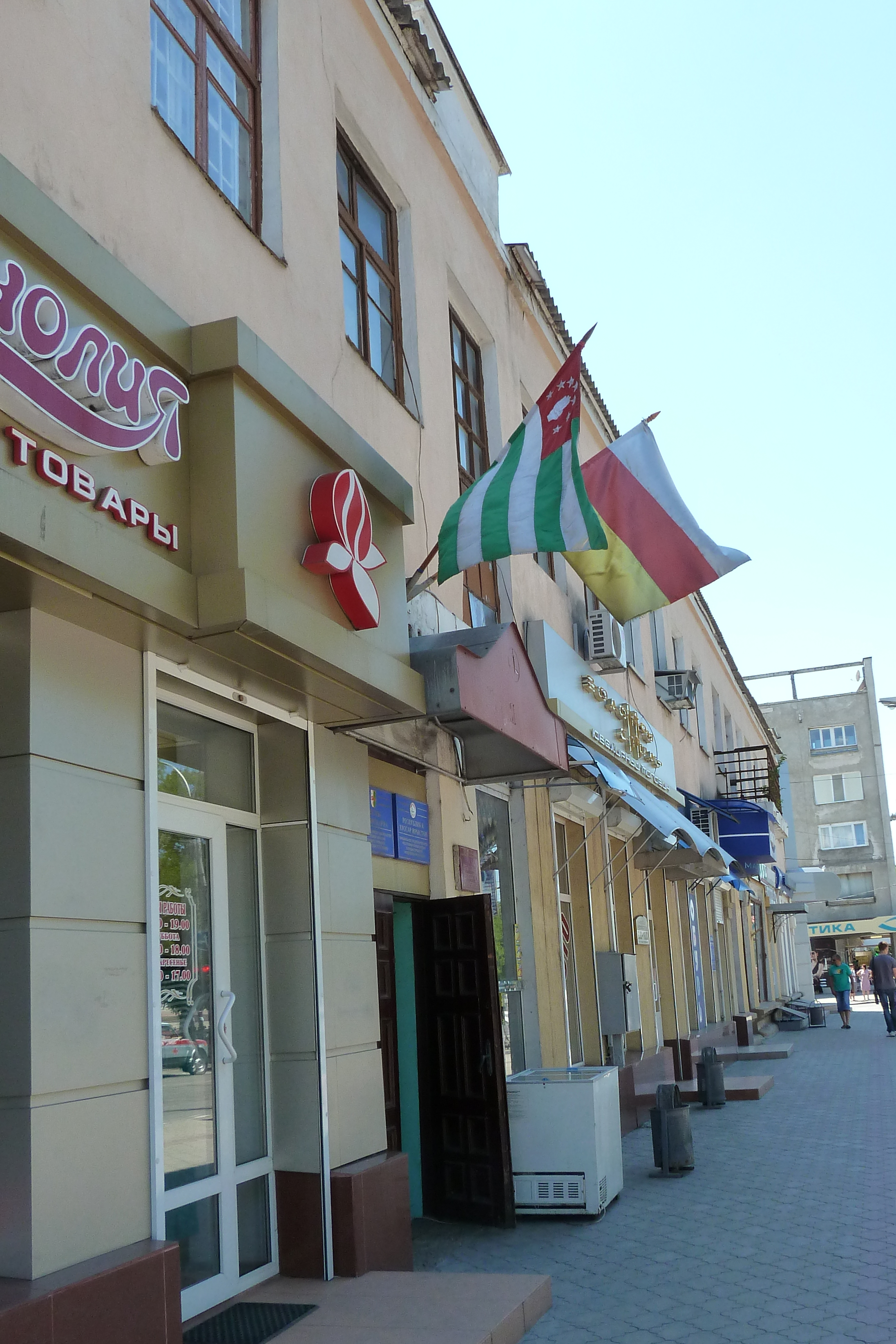
The Representative Office of Abkhazia and Consulate of South Ossetia in Tiraspol.

On 14 June 2006, leaders of Abkhazia, Transnistria and South Ossetia met in Tiraspol and formed the Community for Democracy and Rights of Nations.

On 18 January 2007, First President of Transnistria, Igor Smirnov signing decree and establishing opening Official Representative of Priednistrovian Moldovan Republic to Abkhazia. On the same day, Garri Kupalba was appointed as Plenipotentiary Representative of Transnistria to Abkhazia. On 23 January 2007, President Sergei Bagapsh of Abkhazia appointed Aleksander Vataman as Plenipotentiary Representative of Abkhazia in Transnistria.

On 7 March 2008, Bagapsh formally issued a decree on the establishment of Abkhazia's Official Representative in Transnistria, and on 18 July 2008, the Representative Office was opened in Tiraspol.

On 6 March 2014, former Foreign Minister of Abkhazia Vyacheslav Chirikba held a telephone conference with Foreign Minister Foreign Affairs of Transnistria Igor Schornikov to discuss the situation in the region in light of the events in Ukraine.

In 2015, there were several occasions to strengthening of Abkhazia and Transnistria relationship. On 4 February 2015, a working meeting of President of Abkhazia Raul Khajimba with Plenipotentiary Representative of Abkhazia in Transnistria Alexander Vataman. This meeting discussed preparation activities and Action Plan 2015 of Representative Abkhazia in Transnistria.

From 30 April–5 May 2015, Abkhazia artists such as Dzhansuh Gumagua, Timur Taniya, Kerry Adzhba took part on National Culture Event of Transnistria in Tiraspol.

On 1–4 September 2015, an Abkhazian delegation paid a visit to attend the 25th anniversary of Independence Day of Transnistria. Delegation headed by President Raul Khajimba. Vitaly Gabniya also speech on Independence Day of Transnistria on 1 September 2015. On next day, Raul Khajimba arrived to Transnistria and awarded by Foreign Minister of Transnistria, Igor Schornikov an Order of I Merit of the Priednistrovian Moldovan Republic. Several agenda held are meeting cooperation of Abkhazian State University and State University of Transnistria. Delegation also visiting two enterprises in Tiraspol, museum Benderskaya Tragediya, and two others meeting with N. Kushnir and Head Military Contingent and Consul of Russian Federation to Abkhazia, Colonel Valery Blizhenskiy in Representative Office of Abkhazia in Tiraspol.

Delegation from Transnistria paid a visit to Abkhazia in 24–25 October 2016. The main agenda is signing agreement of mutual visa free visit of citizens of the Abkhazia with Transnistria and agreement on mutual recognition and equivalence of documents on level of education and qualification. Daur Kove honored Vitaly Ignatiev, Foreign Affairs Minister of Transnistria was awarded the Medal of the Foreign Minister of Abkhazia "for merit".

On 17 November 2016, Ministry of Defence Abkhazia hosting meeting between General Army Mirab Kishmariya with Plenipotentiary Representative of Abkhazia in Transnistria, Alexander Vataman. This meeting also attended by Daur Kove and Garri Kupalba, Plenipotentiary Representative of Transnistria to Abkhazia. This meeting is focused on cooperation and friendship of Abkhazia and Transnistria in defence sphere. Alexander Vataman and Garri Kupalba was awarded by General Mirab Kishmariya a medal of Ministry of Defence Abkhazia.

In parliamentary elections of Abkhazia in 2017, on 14 March 2017, Transnistria delegations being one observers with another observers in this election. Oleg Arshba met with delegation of Transnistria in Sukhumi.

On 29 July 2017, Alexander Vataman took part in Transnistria Governmental Events in Bender dedicated to 25th anniversary of Introduction into Zone of Meld. On 1 August 2017, similar events held in Monument of Man Glory, Tiraspol. Alexander Vataman also attended Occasion of 27th Year of Independence Day of Transnistria in Presidential Palace, Tiraspol on 1 September 2017.

In 2017, others meeting was held between two nations. On 4 September 2017, Daur Kove met with Garri Kupalba in Sukhumi. In the next month, on 4 October 2017, Vitaly Ignatiev met with Alexander Vataman in Tiraspol.

In 2018, Oleg Arshba and Garri Kupalba held a meeting on 11th anniversary of Opening Representative Office of Transnistria and Appointing of Garri Kupalba in Abkhazia held on 18 January 2018. Weeks later, Daur Kove met with Garri Kupalba on 25th anniversary of Signing Treaty of Friendship and Cooperation of Abkhazia and Transnistria on 22 January 2018. Same meeting also held between Vitaly Ignatiev, new Foreign Minister of Transnistria and Alexander Vataman in Tiraspol on 29 January 2018.

On 1 September 2018, Alexander Vataman took part in 28th year of Independence Day of Transnistria in Tiraspol. He giving speech in this occasion.

Daur Kove, new Foreign Minister of Abkhazia, met with Garri Kupalba on 26 December 2018 on occasion of Achievement Abkhazia and Transnistria relationship in several spheres and discussion for the next year agendas of cooperation both nations.

Alexander Vataman accompanied by the Foreign Minister of Transnistria and Plenipotentiary Representative of South Ossetia to Transnistria, Vitaly Yevkonsky held Final International Drawing Competition for kids on 27 December 2018 held in Tiraspol.

In 2019, Alexander Vataman met with Vitaly Ignatiev in Tiraspol and also Daur Kove with Garri Kupalba in Sukhumi on the occasion of the 26th anniversary of diplomatic relations between Abkhazia and Transnistria.

== See also ==
- Foreign relations of Abkhazia
- Foreign relations of Transnistria
- Community for Democracy and Rights of Nations
