= South Ossetia–Venezuela relations =

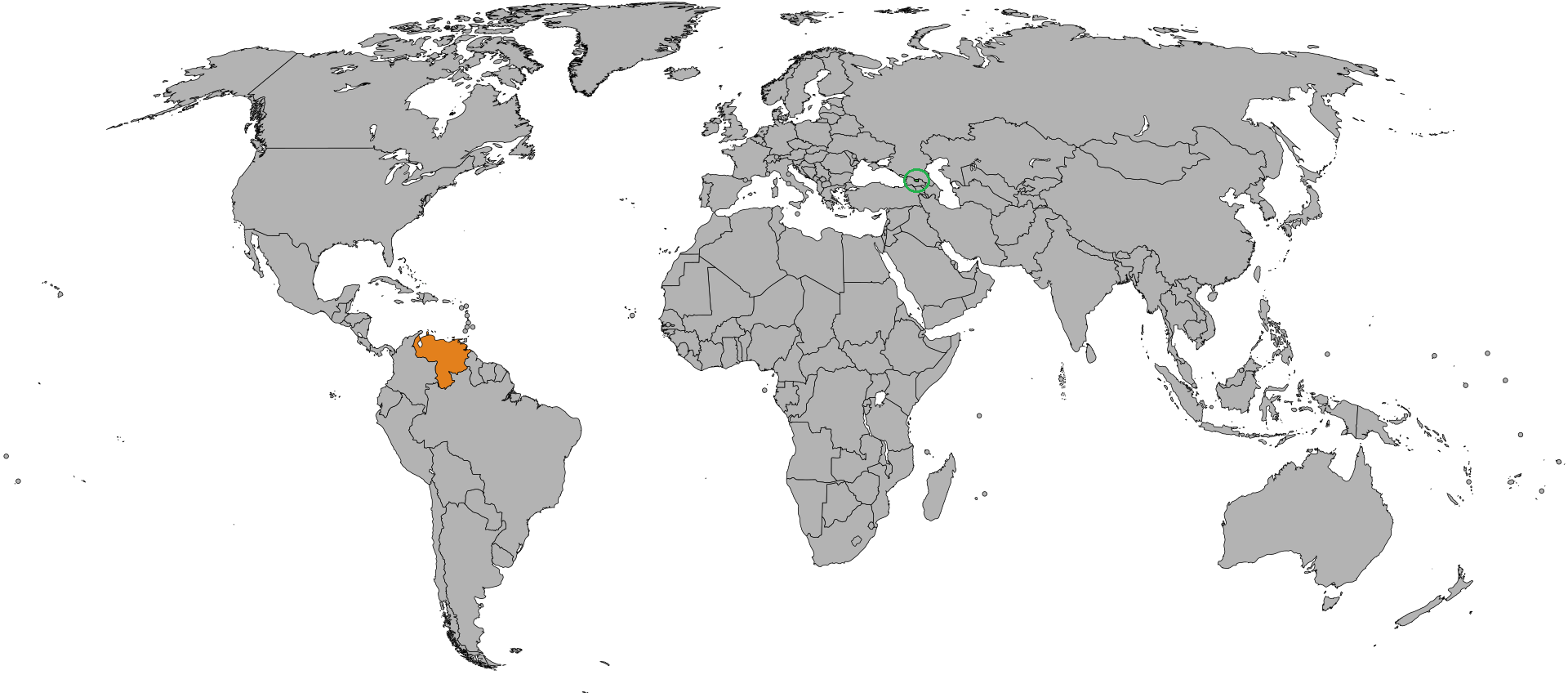

- South Ossetia: Venezuela

South Ossetia–Venezuela relations refers to bilateral foreign relations between the Republic of South Ossetia and Venezuela. Venezuela recognized South Ossetia and Abkhazia on September 10, 2009.

Venezuelan president Hugo Chávez announced that his country recognized South Ossetia and Abkhazia when he was hosted by Russian president Dmitry Medvedev. Chávez also announced that formal diplomatic relations will be established with South Ossetia and Abkhazia.

Chávez had previously defended Russia's recognition of the two republics, saying "Russia has recognized the independence of Abkhazia and South Ossetia. We support Russia. Russia is right and is defending its interests."

After succeeding Eduard Kokoity as President of South Ossetia, Leonid Tibilov dismissed Nariman Kozaev as ambassador on 25 July 2012.

In January 2019, South Ossetian president Anatoly Bibilov traveled to Venezuela as head of a delegation of his country. Bibilov attended the inauguration of Nicolás Maduro as the Venezuelan president. During the Venezuelan presidential crisis, interim president Juan Guaidó sought to withdraw the recognition of Abkhazia and South Ossetia once he could form a new government.
