= Abkhazia–Vanuatu relations =

- Abkhazia: Vanuatu

Abkhazia and Vanuatu established relations when Vanuatu recognised Abkhazia's independence on 23 May 2011. On that day a joint statement on establishment of diplomatic relations was signed. However, the exact nature of the recognition was a matter of dispute and was not regularised until July 2013. However, over the years and part of domestic powerplay within Vanuatu's government, the recognition has swung back and forth. In 2019 Vanuatu's minister of Foreign Affairs "confirmed Vanuatu’s support of Georgia’s sovereignty and territorial integrity" and effectively withdrew the recognition of Abkhazia.

Vanuatu was the fifth UN member state to recognise Abkhazia and the first not to also recognise South Ossetia's independence.

== History ==
=== Initial establishment of relations (May 2011) ===
On 23 May 2011, President of the People's movements Nagriamel and John Frum, Paramount Chief Te Moli Venaos Mol Saken Goiset issued a statement of recognition to the People of Abkhazia. A week later, the Government of Vanuatu offered its condolences to Abkhazia over the passing of President Sergei Bagapsh. Vanuatu assured the Government of Abkhazia that the foundations laid by the late President in establishing political and economic relations between the states would continue to prosper. The same day, in an interview with Russia Today Maxim Gvinjia, the Abkhaz Minister of Foreign Affairs, announced that Vanuatu had recognised Abkhazia's independence and that diplomatic relations had been established. The diplomatic agreement had been signed on 23 May 2011 by Prime Ministers of Abkhazia Sergey Shamba and of Vanuatu Sato Kilman, and also established a visa-free travel regime between the two countries. According to Gvinjia, the document had been exchanged by air, and had been negotiated in secret over a period of several months.

Despite an initial denial on 3 June by Vanuatu's Permanent Representative to the United Nations, Donald Kalpokas, Vanuatu's recognition of Abkhazia was confirmed by its government on 7 June and a copy of the agreement was released.

=== Attempted withdrawal of recognition by Natapei (June 2011) and subsequent reconfirmation ===
On 16 June, Chief Justice Vincent Lunabek of Vanuatu ruled that since Sato Kilman's December 2010 election as Prime Minister had not occurred through secret ballot, it had violated article 41 of the constitution, and he re-instated Edward Natapei as interim prime minister. On 17 June, Natapei announced that he was withdrawing Vanuatu's recognition for Abkhazia, and that he would seek to establish relations with Georgia. However, a week later Sato Kilman was re-elected as prime minister, and in a note dated 1 July 2011, Vanuatu Foreign Minister Alfred Carlot informed the government of Abkhazia that the Cabinet of Vanuatu had "voted in favour of supporting the Republic of Abkhazia in establishing diplomatic and financial ties". The note also reiterated that the original memorandum signed on 23 May by the Prime Ministers of both countries "remained in force despite earlier announcement". Vanuatu's recognition of Abkhazia was again confirmed on 12 July by Carlot, expressing Vanuatu's "desire to establish diplomatic relations with Abkhazia", and on 7 October by Vanuatu's government.

=== Exchanges between Abkhazia and Vanuatu ===
Te Moli Venaos Mol Saken (Thi Tam) Goiset, one of the strongest proponents of Vanuatu recognition of Abkhaz independence was appointed Ambassador of Vanuatu for Abkhazia and other countries, including Russia.

On 12 July 2011 the Ambassador of Abkhazia in the Asia-Pacific region, Juris Gulbis, stated that Abkhazia and Vanuatu plan to sign a framework agreement on cooperation in the field of culture, trade and the banking sector. According to him, the Government of Vanuatu twice confirmed the establishment of diplomatic relations with Abkhazia and of their intention to contribute to the development of friendly ties between the two States.

On 30 July 2011, the Abkhaz Minister of Foreign Affairs, sent a congratulatory note on the occasion of the Independence Day celebration in Vanuatu, reading "I would especially like to note a positive trend that emerged in the relations between our countries. I hope that our relationship will continue to grow stronger and develop in the same beneficial way."

On 28 September 2011, Te Moli Venaos Mol Saken Goiset, Ambassador designate to Abkhazia from Vanuatu, congratulated the new Abkhaz President Alexander Ankvab on his inauguration.

In January 2012 it was reported that Abkhazia planned to export wine to Vanuatu.

=== Establishment of diplomatic relations with Georgia under Carcasses (2013) ===
On 18 March 2013, Johnny Koanapo, Vanuatu Director-General of Foreign Affairs, stated that diplomatic relations had never been established with Abkhazia. He said that "There’s been a confusion over what the government had intended to do which was just simply a letter stating that there might be an intention to establish relations with Abkhazia. But at this point in time, there’s no action on that and there’s no decision". The Ministry of Foreign Affairs of Abkhazia responded with a statement claiming that they had "not received any official notification of the severance of diplomatic relations between the two countries" and that the "recognition of the Republic of Abkhazia is irreversible".

On 20 May 2013, Georgia claimed that Moana Carcasses Kalosil, Vanuatu's new Prime Minister, had confirmed that Vanuatu had withdrawn its recognition of Abkhazia. However, the next day Abkhazia's Deputy Foreign Minister Irakli Khintba responded by saying that no decision to cancel diplomatic relations between Abkhazia and Vanuatu had been taken, and that Kalosil's statements were only his personal point of view which was not the result of an official decision by the government.

On 12 July 2013 Georgia and Vanuatu signed an agreement on establishing diplomatic and consular relations. The agreement, which was signed at the United Nations headquarters, stated: "the Republic of Vanuatu recognizes territorial integrity of Georgia within its internationally recognized borders, including its regions - the Autonomous Republic of Abkhazia and the Tskhinvali Region/South Ossetia." While Georgian President Mikheil Saakashvili thanked the Vanuatuan government for withdrawing its recognition, the Foreign Minister of Abkhazia, Viacheslav Chirikba, insisted that Vanuatu had not officially withdrawn its recognition of Abkhazia,

=== Renewed contacts between Abkhazia and Vanuatu (2015) ===
On 30 March 2015, during a visit by Vanuatu Foreign Minister Sato Kilman to Moscow to discuss aid following Cyclone Pam, he met with his Abkhazian counterpart Viacheslav Chirikba. The two officials expressed their desire to strengthen bilateral relations, and Chirikba expressed his condolences and offered Abkhazia's assistance with disaster relief. On 31 March, Kilman was asked by RIA Novosti whether Vanuatu still recognised. He responded that "nothing had changed" in respect to Vanuatu's 2011 recognition of Abkhazia, but that the Carcasses government had decided to establish diplomatic relations with Georgia rather than Abkhazia. He didn't consider diplomatic relations with Abkhazia and Georgia to be incompatible, and hoped diplomatic relations with Abkhazia would soon be formalised. In June 2015, Kilman was sacked as foreign minister, partly as a result of this meeting, with Prime Minister Joe Natuman again clarifying the government's position that "Abkhazia is part of Georgia". However, the following week Kilman replaced Natuman as prime minister.

=== Vanuatu's confirmation of Georgia's territorial integrity (2019) ===
On 14 March 2019 Vanuatu Foreign Minister Ralph Regenvanu met with his Georgian counterpart David Zalkaliani in Tbilisi. While both sides committed to deepen bilateral ties, Regenvanu "confirmed Vanuatu’s support of Georgia’s sovereignty and territorial integrity", according to the Georgian Ministry of Foreign Affairs. Zalkaliani commented "We are grateful that the Republic of Vanuatu is consistent in pursuing the non-recognition policy of the so-called independence of Georgia’s occupied regions, in full compliance with fundamental norms and principles of international law". The following day Regenvanu visited the conflict line and a Memorandum of Co-operation was signed between the two sides.

While at the conflict line, Regenvanu said: "Vanuatu has always recognized the territorial integrity of Georgia. In 2011 we had a minister who expressed a different position. In my opinion, he was influenced by certain individuals and recognized the independence of South Ossetia and Abkhazia. His decision was not an official position of the state". In other words, the minister removed any doubt on the status of recognition.

== United Nations resolutions on return of Georgian IDPs ==
Since Georgia's first submission in 2009 at the United Nations General Assembly of a resolution on the "Status of internally displaced persons and refugees from Abkhazia, Georgia, and the Tskhinvali region/South Ossetia, Georgia", Vanuatu has supported this annually returning resolution, contrary to all other UN members that recognise Abkhazia's independence. Only in 2015 it abstained from this vote, precisely when it had government issues over the recognition (see above).

== International agreements ==
- Joint statement on establishment of diplomatic relations
- Visa-free travel regime agreement
- Agreement on cooperation in the field of culture, trade and banking sector (in the preparation)

== Ambassadors ==
- Vanuatu Ambassador to Abkhazia: The Roving Ambassador of Vanuatu to Russia and the Eastern Countries – Te Moli Venaos Mol Saken (Thi Tam) Goiset
- Abkhazia Ambassador to Vanuatu: The Ambassador at Large of Abkhazia in the Asia-Pacific region – Juris Gulbis, based in Fiji
