= Sukhumi Higher Combined-Arms Command School =

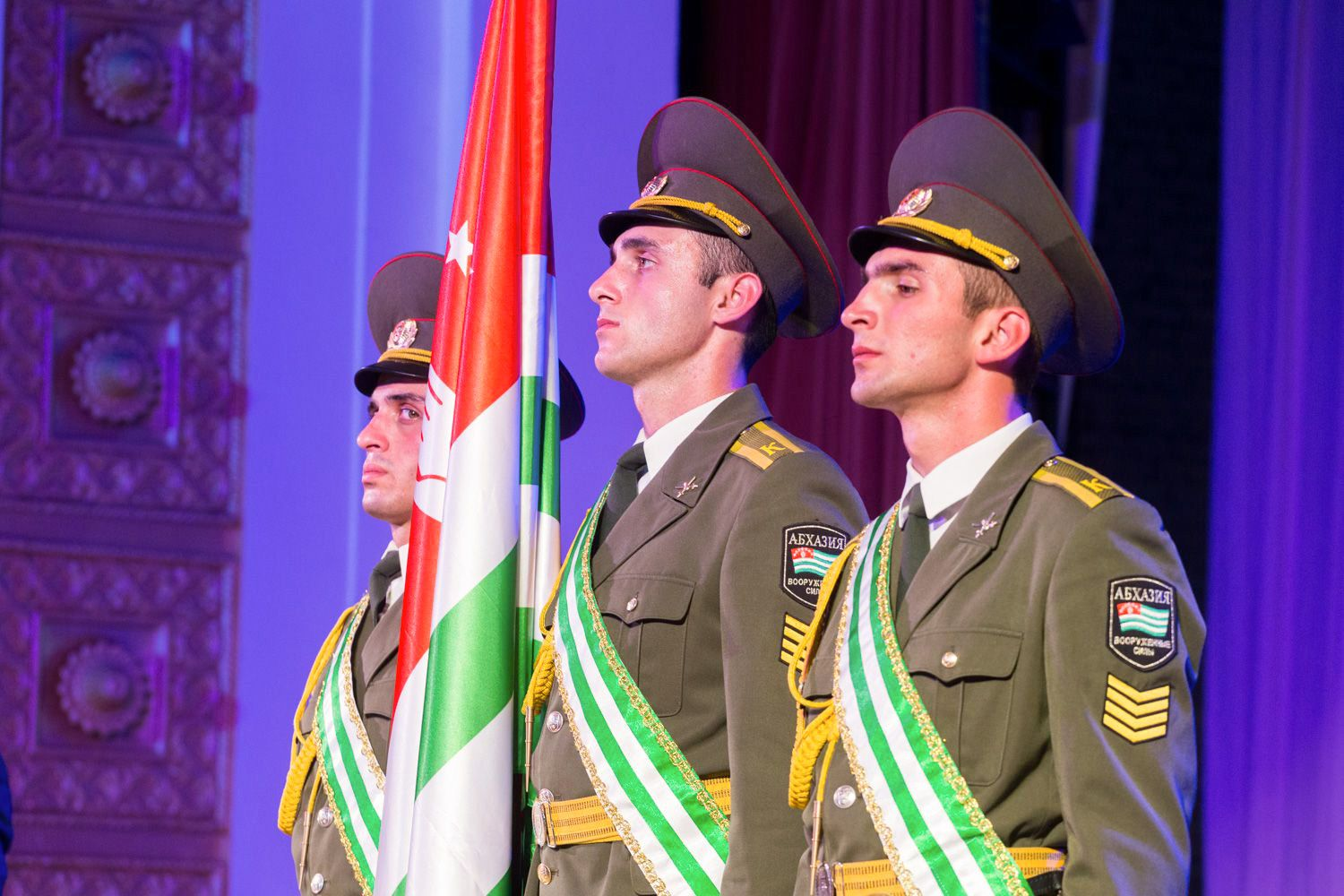
The honour guard of the academy.

The Sukhumi Higher Combined-Arms Command School (SVOKU) (Russian: Сухумское высшее общевойсковое командное училище), is a higher military institution of the Abkhazian Armed Forces based in Sukhumi, as its name implies. It is the only educational institution in the armed forces. Outside of the SVOKU, Abkhazian cadets rely on Military academies in Russia.

== Overview ==
=== History ===
Military education in Abkhazia began in 1995. The school was founded on 31 October 2000 by order of Minister of Defence Vladimir Mikanba. It began being known as the Sukhumi Military Higher Combined Arms Command School. On 22 July 2005, by order of the Government, it ditched the military part of its name, leaving it with its present day name.

=== Training ===
Cadets are trained in platoon and squad drill. Combat specialization is applied to those headed into motor rifle and artillery units. Educational training is carried out in the Russian language as well as the Abkhazian language. Upon graduation, graduates are assigned the officer rank of Lieutenant. Admission is restricted to undergraduates. Unlike other military institution, the term of study at the SVOKU is only four years.

=== Characteristics ===
The defence minister serves as the ex officio rector. Being a legal entity, it has its own seal, which includes the Emblem of Abkhazia along with its name. The academy maintains an Honour Guard Company, which is made up of 35 cadets. Members of the unit took part in the official state funeral of Sergei Bagapsh in 2011.

=== Activities ===
In September 2020, cadets of the school visited the neighboring Republic of South Ossetia, as part of a large delegation that participated in the celebrations of the 30th anniversary of the formation of the republic. During the visit, the cadets toured National Museum of South Ossetia and participated in the Independence Day military parade on Theatre Square in Tskhinvali.

== See also ==
- Kristapor Ivanyan Military College
- Vazgen Sargsyan Military University
- Military Institute of the Ministry of Defense (Transnistria)
- Military University of the Ministry of Defense of the Russian Federation
- National Defense Academy (Georgia)
