= List of flags of Georgia (country) =

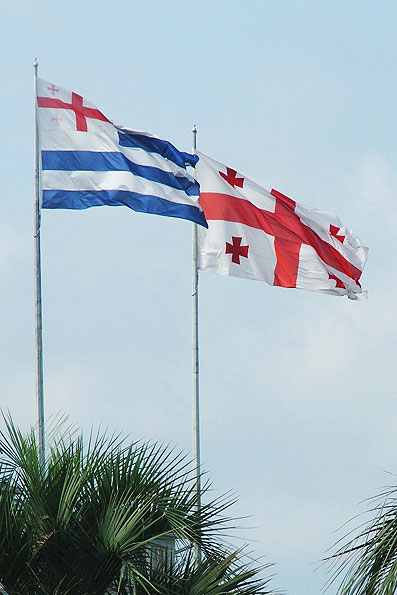
The flag of Georgia alongside the flag of autonomous Adjara

The following is a list of flags of Georgia.

== National flag ==
Flag	Date	Use	Description
	2004–present	Civil and state flag and ensign	A white field split by a centred red cross; each white corner itself receiving a red Bolnisi cross. Ratio: 2:3
	2004–present	Flag of Georgia (vertical)	

== President's flag ==
Flag	Date	Use	Description
	2020–present	Flag of the president of Georgia	
	These two flags were used in different periods from 2004 to 2020, although neither of them was an officially approved flag of the President.	Flag of the president of Georgia	
	These two flags were used in different periods from 2004 to 2020, although neither of them was an officially approved flag of the President.	Flag of the president of Georgia	
	1918–1920	Flag of the government of the Democratic Republic of Georgia	

== Military ==
Flag	Date	Use	Description
	2004–present	War flag	
	2004–present	Flag of the Chief of the General Staff	
	2004–present	Flag of the Minister of Defence	

=== Land Force ===
Flag	Date	Use	Description
	2004–present	Flag of the Georgian Land Forces	

=== National Guard ===
Flag	Date	Use	Description
	2018–present	Flag of the National Guard of Georgia	
	2004–2018	Flag of the National Guard	

=== Air force ===
Flag	Date	Use	Description
	2019–present	Flag of the Georgian Air Force	Flag of Aviation and Air Defence Command
	2004–2019	Flag of the Georgian Air Force	Flag of former Georgian Air Force, which was disbanded in 2010 but then was reestablished as Aviation and Air Defence Command in 2016

=== Coast Guard and former Navy ===
Flag	Date	Use	Description
	2009–present	Flag of the Georgian Coast Guard	
	2009–present	Ensign of the Georgian Coast Guard	
	2004–2009	Naval ensign	
	1997–2004	Ensign of the Georgian Navy	Was used for Georgian Navy until a new ensign was implemented in 2004.
	1997–2004	Flag of the commander-in-chief of the Georgian Navy	

The proposed naval flag of the Georgian Democratic Republic	The proposed naval flag of the Georgian Democratic Republic	The proposed naval flag of the Georgian Democratic Republic

=== Paramilitary ===
Flag	Date	Use	Description
	1989–1995	Flag of Mkhedrioni	

== Border Police ==
Flag	Date	Use	Description
	1997–present	Flag of the Georgian Border Police	
	1997–present	Flag of the Georgian Border Police Special Air Force	
	1997–present	Flag of the Georgian Border Police Rapid Reaction Directorate	

== Intelligence Service ==
Flag	Date	Use	Description
	2004–present	Flag of the Georgian Intelligence Service	

== Heraldic Authorities ==
Flag	Date	Use	Description
	?–present	Flag of the State Council of Heraldry	

== Self-governing city flags ==
Flag	Date	Use	Description
	2004–present	Flag of Tbilisi	Flag of the capital of Georgia
	2004–present	Flag of Kutaisi	Flag of a legislative city of Georgia, located in the Imereti region
	2004–present	Flag of Batumi	Flag of the capital of the Autonomous Republic of Adjara and the biggest port in the Republic.
	2004–present	Flag of Rustavi	Flag of the biggest city in the Kvemo Kartli region.
	2004–present	Flag of Poti	Flag of a secondary Georgian port city, located in the Samegrelo-Zemo Svaneti region.

== Self-governing community flags ==
Flag	Date	Use	Description
		Flag of Abasha Municipality	Flag of a municipality in the Samegrelo-Zemo Svaneti region
		Flag of Adigeni Municipality	Flag of a municipality in the Samtskhe-Javakheti region
		Flag of Akhalgori Municipality	Flag of a provisional municipality on the territory of former South Ossetia region
		Flag of Akhaltsikhe Municipality	Flag of a municipality in the Samtskhe-Javakheti region
		Flag of Akhmeta Municipality	Flag of a municipality in the Kakheti region
		Flag of Ambrolauri Municipality	Flag of a municipality in the Racha-Lechkhumi and Kvemo Svaneti region
		Flag of Aspindza Municipality	Flag of a municipality in the Samtskhe-Javakheti region
		Flag of Baghdati Municipality	Flag of a municipality in the Imereti region
		Flag of Bolnisi Municipality	Flag of a municipality in the Kvemo Kartli region
		Flag of Borjomi Municipality	Flag of a municipality in the Samtskhe-Javakheti region
		Flag of Chiatura Municipality	Flag of a municipality in the Imereti region
		Flag of Chkhorotsqu Municipality	Flag of a municipality in the Samegrelo-Zemo Svaneti region
		Flag of Chokhatauri Municipality	Flag of a municipality in the Guria region
		Flag of Dedoplistskaro Municipality	Flag of a municipality in the Kakheti region
		Flag of Dmanisi Municipality	Flag of a municipality in the Kvemo Kartli region
		Flag of Dusheti Municipality	Flag of a municipality in the Mtskheta-Mtianeti region
		Flag of Eredvi Municipality	Flag of a provisional municipality on the territory of former South Ossetia region
		Flag of Gardabani Municipality	Flag of a municipality in Kvemo Kartli region
		Flag of Gori Municipality	Flag of a municipality in Shida Kartli region
		Flag of Kareli Municipality	Flag of a municipality in Kakheti region
		Flag of Kaspi Municipality	Flag of a municipality in Shida Kartli region
		Flag of Kazbegi Municipality	Flag of a municipality in Mtskheta-Mtianeti region
		Flag of Keda Municipality	Flag of a municipality in the Autonomous Republic of Adjara
		Flag of Kharagauli Municipality	Flag of a municipality in the Imereti region
		Flag of Khashuri Municipality	Flag of a municipality in the Shida Kartli region
		Flag of Khelvachauri Municipality	Flag of a municipality in the Autonomous Republic of Adjara
		Flag of Khobi Municipality	Flag of a municipality in the Samegrelo-Zemo Svaneti region
		Flag of Khulo Municipality	Flag of a municipality in the Autonomous Republic of Adjara
		Flag of Kobuleti Municipality	Flag of a municipality in the Autonomous Republic of Adjara
		Flag of Kurta Municipality	Flag of a provisional municipality on the territory of former South Ossetia region
		Flag of Kvareli Municipality	Flag of a municipality in the Kakheti region
		Flag of Lagodekhi Municipality	Flag of a municipality in the Kakheti region
		Flag of Lanchkhuti Municipality	Flag of a municipality in the Guria region
		Flag of Lentekhi Municipality	Flag of a municipality in the Racha-Lechkhumi and Kvemo Svaneti region
		Flag of Marneuli Municipality	Flag of a municipality in the Kvemo Kartli region
		Flag of Martvili Municipality	Flag of a municipality in the Samegrelo-Zemo Svaneti region
		Flag of Mtskheta Municipality	Flag of a municipality in the Mtskheta-Mtianeti region
		Flag of Ninotsminda Municipality	Flag of a municipality in the Samtskhe-Javakheti region
		Flag of Oni Municipality	Flag of a municipality in the Racha-Lechkhumi and Kvemo Svaneti region
		Flag of Sachkhere Municipality	Flag of a municipality in the Imereti region
		Flag of Sagarejo Municipality	Flag of a municipality in the Kakheti region
		Flag of Samtredia Municipality	Flag of a municipality in the Imereti region
		Flag of Senaki Municipality	Flag of a municipality in the Samegrelo-Zemo Svaneti region
		Flag of Shuakhevi Municipality	Flag of a municipality in the Autonomous Republic of Adjara
		Flag of Sighnaghi Municipality	Flag of a municipality in the Kakheti region
		Flag of Tetritskaro Municipality	Flag of a municipality in the Kakheti region
		Flag of Tianeti Municipality	Flag of a municipality in the Mtskheta-Mtianeti region
		Flag of Tighva Municipality	Flag of a provisional municipality on the territory of former South Ossetia region
		Flag of Tkibuli Municipality	Flag of a municipality in the Imereti region
		Flag of Zugdidi Municipality	Flag of a municipality in the Samegrelo-Zemo Svaneti region

== Regional flags ==
Flag	Date	Use	Description
	2004–present	Flag of Adjara	Used by the government of the Autonomous Republic of Adjara.
	2000–2004	Flag of Adjara	Was used by Aslan Abashidze's semi-independent government of the Autonomous Republic of Adjara.
	1951–2000	Flag of the Adjarian ASSR	Flag of Adjara from the Soviet era.
	2013–present	Flag used by the Georgian Government of the Autonomous Republic of Abkhazia.	Used by Georgian Government. It's the de jure flag for the Abkhazian Autonomy.
	1990–present	Flag of South Ossetia and Provisional Administrative Entity of South Ossetia (Samachablo).	Used both by the separatist government of the self-proclaimed Republic of South Ossetia and the Georgian government-aligned Provisional Administrative Entity. Also subsequently the flag of the Russian Autonomous Republic of North Ossetia-Alania.

== Political flags ==
Flag	Date	Party	Description
current
	2012–present	Georgian Dream	
	2017–present	Georgian March	King David the Builder flag
	2015–present	Georgian Power^{ka}	
	2006–present	Republican Party of Georgia	
	2004–present	Conservative Party of Georgia and Tavisupleba	Flag of Georgia (1990–2004)
	2020–present	Girchi – More Freedom	
	2024–present	New Political Centre – Girchi	
	2016–present	Georgian National Unity	
	2024–present	National Socialist Georgian Worker's Party	
	1990s–present	United Javakhk Democratic Alliance	
	2008–present	Christian-Democratic Movement	
	2022–present		Flag used during the Russo-Ukrainian War
	2024–present		Flag used in the 2024–2025 Georgian protests
former
	1993–2003	Union of Citizens of Georgia	
	1992–2004	Democratic Union for Revival	

== Religious flags ==
Flag	Date	Use	Description
	1991–present	Flag of the Georgian Orthodox Church	

== Historical flags ==
Flag	Date	Use	Description
	1990–2004	Civil and state flag and ensign	Ratio: 3:5
	1951–1990	Flag of the Georgian Soviet Socialist Republic	Red hammer and sickle with star in a blue sun in canton, blue bar in upper part of flag. Adopted 11 April 1951.
	1951–1990	Reverse side	All flags of the constituent republics of the Soviet Union did not bear the hammer and sickle on their reverse side.
	1940–1951	Flag of the Georgian Soviet Socialist Republic	Red, with the Georgian characters სსსრ (SSSR) in gold in the canton.
	1937–1940	Flag of the Georgian Soviet Socialist Republic	Red, with the Georgian characters საქართველოს სსრ (Sakartvelos SSR) in gold in the canton.
	1921–1937	Flag of the Georgian Soviet Socialist Republic	Red, with the Cyrillic characters ССРГ (SSRG) in the canton.
	1922–1936	Flag of the Transcaucasian Socialist Federative Soviet Republic	Red, with the Cyrillic characters ЗСФСР (ZSFSR) in gold and with as well golden, tilted star in the canton.
	1922–1936	Flag of the Transcaucasian Socialist Federative Soviet Republic (variant)	A gold semicircle encircling the star with the gold Cyrillic letters "ЗСФСР".
	1918–1921	Flag of the Democratic Republic of Georgia	Ratio: 4:5
	1918–1921	Flag of the Democratic Republic of Georgia	Ratio: 1:2
	1919–1920	Alleged flag of the Republic of Batumi	
	22 April – 28 May 1918	Alleged flag of the Transcaucasian Federation	
	18th century	A banner of the Principality of Samtskhe	
	18th century	A banner of the Kingdom of Kakheti	
	18th century	A banner of the Principality of Guria	
	18th century	A banner of the Kingdom of Imereti	
	18th century	A banner of the Principality of Svaneti	
	18th–19th century	A banner of the Principality of Abkhazia	
	18th–19th century	A banner of the Kingdom of Georgia	
	18th–19th century	A banner of the Kingdom of Georgia	
	18th–19th century	A banner of the Kingdom of Kakheti-Hereti	
	18th–19th century	A banner of the Principality of Kvartiani	
	18th–19th century	A banner of the Principality of Samtskhe	
	18th–19th century	A banner of the Kingdom of Kartli	
	18th–19th century	A banner of the Principality of Shirvani	
	18th–19th century	A banner of the Principality of Ovsetia	
	18th–19th century	A banner of the Principality of Odishi	
	1560s	Flags of the Principality of Mingrelia	
	15th–18th centuries	Flag of the Kingdom of Imereti	
	13th and 14th centuries	Flag of Western Georgia	
	14th and 15th centuries	A flag of the Kingdom of Georgia	
	14th and 15 centuries	A flag of the Kingdom of Georgia	
	1320–1321	Flag of Phasis	
	1184–1213	Flag of the Kingdom of Georgia	Used during the reign of Queen Tamar.
	1089–1125	Flag of the Kingdom of Georgia	Used during the reign of David the Builder.
	449–522 and 888–1008	Flag of the Kingdom of Iberia during Vakhtang I and flag of Principality of Tao-Klarjeti	

=== Other ===
Flag	Date	Use	Description
	1918–1921	Standard of the Democratic Republic of Georgia	

== Separatist Abkhazia ==
=== National flag ===
Flag	Date	Use	Description
	1992–present	Flag used by the Abkhazian separatist government.	It is de facto flag of the Republic of Abkhazia. Used by the separatist government.

=== President's flag ===
Flag	Date	Use	Description
	1992–present	Flag of the president of Abkhazia	

=== Abkhazian Armed Forces ===
Flag	Date	Use	Description
	1992–present	Flag of the Abkhazian Armed Forces	
	?–present	Another variant of Abkhazian military banner.	

==== Navy ====
Flag	Date	Use	Description
	1992–present	Naval ensign of the Republic of Abkhazia	

=== Historical flags ===
Flag	Date	Use	Description
	1989–1992	Flag of the Abkhaz Autonomous Soviet Socialist Republic	
	1978–1989	Flag of the Abkhaz Autonomous Soviet Socialist Republic	
	1951–1978	Flag of the Abkhaz Autonomous Soviet Socialist Republic	
	1938–1951	Flag of the Abkhaz Autonomous Soviet Socialist Republic	
	1937–1938	Flag of the Abkhaz Autonomous Soviet Socialist Republic	
	1935–1937	Flag of the Abkhaz Autonomous Soviet Socialist Republic	
	1925–1931	Flag of the Socialist Soviet Republic of Abkhazia	
	1925	Flag of the Socialist Soviet Republic of Abkhazia	
	1921–1925	Flag of the Socialist Soviet Republic of Abkhazia	
	1917–1921	Flag of the Mountainous Republic of the Northern Caucasus	
	1866	A flag used in the Lykhnensky revolt	
	1808–1810	Flag of Abkhazia	
	18th century	Flag of the Principality of Abkhazia	
	1578	Flag of Abkhazia	
	786–1354	Flag of the Duchy of Tskhumi	

== Separatist South Ossetia ==
=== National flag ===
Flag	Date	Use	Description
	1991–present	Flag used by the Ossetian separatist government.	The flag of the self-proclaimed Republic of South Ossetia that was used by the Georgian-established Provisional Administrative Entity of South Ossetia and also the flag of the ethnically related Republic of North Ossetia-Alania within the Russian Federation.
	1991–present	Flag of the president of South Ossetia	Used by the separatist established government.

== See also ==
- Flag of Georgia (country)
- Coat of arms of Georgia (country)
