= Battle of the Gumista =

March Offensive
- Part of the War in Abkhazia (1992–1993)
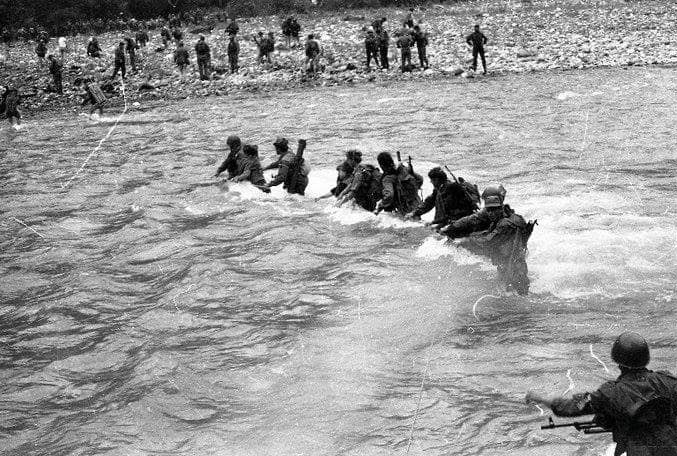
- Pictured are the Abkhazian separatists and their allies, crossing the Gumista River.
Date	15–16 March 1993
Location	Gumista River, Georgia
Result	Georgian victory (Note: See Outcome for further details.)

Belligerents
Abkhazia; CMPC; Russia	Georgia

Commanders and leaders
Sergei Dbar; Sultan Sosnaliyev; Sergei Matosyan	Tengiz Kitovani; Giorgi Karkarashvili; Geno Adamia

Strength
Participating Abkhazian Units: Gudauta Assault Group; 3rd Motorized Rifle Brigade; Sharatyn Battalion; 1st Battalion; Bagramyan Battalion; 2nd Assault Group; Gagra Assault Group; Pitsunda Battalion; Athos-Eshera Assault Group; Company of the Gumista Front; 5th Coast Guard Battalion; Saturn Group; Uragan Group; Russian aviation (air support); Abkhazian artillery	23rd Brigade; Several infantry battalions Armored vehicle crews

Casualties and losses
222 killed, 26 missing (Abkhaz claim)	107 killed (Georgian claim)

The March Offensive or the Battle of the Gumista was a battle between Georgian armed forces and Abkhaz separatists. It was held on March 15–16, 1993 along 8 kilometres (5.0 mi) of the banks of the Gumista River.

== Background ==
In early 1993, Abkhazian separatists controlled half of the autonomous republic of Abkhazia and, after having strengthened their positions after opening the border with Russia, the separatists shifted their focus to capturing Sokhumi, the capital of the region. To organize themselves, they established the Ministry of Defense on 10 October 1992. Mercenaries, including the Bagramyan Battalion, a unit composed predominantly of ethnic Armenians, joined the Abkhazian Armed Forces. The Abkhazians secured a significant ammunition supply and manpower from various regions, including receiving help from the Middle East. Together with North Caucasian militants and Russian military units, they prepared for a major assault on Sukhumi.

== Battle ==
The March Offensive commenced during the night of March 15-16, 1993, under the leadership of Colonel Sergei Dbar, marking a critical yet ultimately unsuccessful attempt by Abkhaz forces to break Georgian defenses near Sukhum. The operation began at 00:45 with a close air support operation, undertaken by Russian coordinated air and artillery strike targeting Georgian positions, followed by a simultaneous multi-directional ground assault along the Gumista River.

Initial advances included a 23-soldier special forces unit securing the upper Gumista bridge, engaging Georgian forces in close combat. Assault groups, including the Gudauta Assault Group and the 3rd Motorized Rifle Brigade, crossed the Gumista River near the suspension bridge and fought toward Eshba Street. However, some units became isolated and were subjected to intense tank and artillery fire at dawn.

One notable incident occurred on a village street where Abkhaz fighters encountered an apparently abandoned Georgian infantry fighting vehicle (BMP). Contrary to expectations, the vehicle was operational, and its crew launched a surprise attack, causing casualties including the death of soldier Avto Dzidzaria.

Despite reaching initial objectives, such as the Athos-Eshera assault group capturing the Achadar railway platform, the offensive faltered as Georgian forces rapidly mobilized reserves and intensified artillery bombardments. This disrupted Abkhaz attempts to reinforce frontline positions and resulted in encirclement of several units. Over the course of three days, Abkhaz troops endured heavy Georgian fire, shortages of food and water, and sustained significant casualties. It was not until March 18 that the encircled units managed to break through Georgian lines and retreat. Ultimately, the offensive failed to achieve its primary goals, forcing Abkhaz forces to withdraw to their original positions. The operation resulted in approximately 222 Abkhaz soldiers killed and 23 missing. According to Sultan Sosnaliyev himself, tactical miscalculations, including inconsistent unit coordination and unclear command execution, were identified as contributing factors to the offensive's failure. However, the lessons learned informed subsequent successful operations later in 1993, particularly regarding the strategic importance of securing dominant terrain north of Sukhumi.

== Outcome ==
Despite being a tactical victory for Georgia, the Abkhazians noted that "the tragic lessons learned from the March Offensive made it clear that capturing the dominant heights on the northern approaches to the capital was necessary to take Sukhum." While the March Offensive failed to achieve its immediate military objectives, resulting in substantial losses with over 200 Abkhaz soldiers killed and some missing, it provided important operational insights. Tactical missteps such as poor coordination and imprecise command execution were identified, which informed revised strategies.

== Sources on internet ==
- "How Sokhumi fell". 2006 public channel documentary, author Mikheil Basiladze. Director: Levan Akhobadze.
- The documentary film "The Last Day of Sokhumi" shot by Rustavi 2 in 2013. Author: Toma Chagelishvili.
- Rustavi 2's 2015 documentary film "Abkhaz Walk" by Toma Chagelishvili.
