= Battle of Sokhumi =

Battle of Sokhumi may refer to:

- Siege of Sokhumi (1810)
- Battle of Sokhumi (1918)
- Battle of Sokhumi (1992)
- Battle of Gumista
- Battle of Sukhumi (September 1993)
