= Tbilisi Higher Artillery Command School =

Soviet military training institution

- Тбилисское высшее артиллерийское командное училище
- Type: military academy
- Active: 1864–1992
- Location: Tbilisi, USSR
- Language: Russian
- Website: tvakku.ru

The Tbilisi Higher Artillery Command School (Russian: Тбилисское высшее артиллерийское командное училище (ТВАККУ)) was one of the military institutions of the USSR. In different years she trained specialists of various military specialties. It was located in Tbilisi in the Georgian SSR. It is the predecessor in military education to the David Aghmashenebeli National Defense Academy.

== History ==
=== Origins ===
The school was founded on 8 November 1864 by the governor of the Caucasus, Grand Duke Mikhail Nikolayevich of Russia.

=== Soviet Establishment (1920–1921) ===
Its history began on August 20, 1920, when the Eastern Brigade of Cadets was formed using the personnel and infrastructure of existing military academies in Moscow, Petrograd, and various cities within the Volga region, this new brigade included the 6th Cadet Regiment of Saratov and was specifically tasked with supporting impending Red Army operations in the Transcaucasus. Between February 20 and 25, 1921, the 6th Cadet Regiment, operating as a component of the 1st Eastern Cadet Brigade of the 11th Army engaged in heavy fighting during the Red Army invasion of Georgia to overthrow the Democratic Republic of Georgia and establish Soviet control.

=== Interwar years (1921–1940) ===
In 1921, the 6th Cadet Regiment was converted into the 2nd Infantry Machine Gun Course, which was subsequently renamed on May 25 of that year to the 13th Baku Infantry Machine Gun Command Course. The Central Executive Committee of the Georgian SSR awarded the school an honorary revolutionary Red Banner on February 27, 1923. Later that year, on September 22, the facility became the 21st Baku Infantry School. It played a direct role in liquidating the Menshevik-led August Uprising in late August and early September 1924, after which it was renamed the Tiflis Infantry School (TIS) on October 1.

Military-political courses were introduced at the school in October 1926, and by September 1927, the facility was reorganized into the Transcaucasian Infantry School (ZPSh). In 1929, the school established an artillery division, marking the beginning of its officer training programs in that specific branch. On February 10, 1929, the Central Executive Committee awarded the school a second revolutionary Red Banner, and on November 20, the institution was formally named in honor of the 26 Baku Commissars. It was transformed into the Transcaucasian United Military School (ZOVSh) on October 8, 1935; renamed the Tbilisi Military School named after 26 Baku Commissars on March 16, 1937; and finally, reorganized into the Tbilisi Mountain Artillery School named after 26 Baku Commissars on October 31, 1938.

=== World War II (1941–1945) ===
The German invasion of the Soviet Union in June 1941 forced the academy to rapidly supply artillery officers to the front lines. In recognition of its massive war contributions, including training more than 6,000 artillery commanders, the school was presented with a newe Red Banner on February 5, 1944, and was awarded the Order of the Red Banner on August 19, 1945, in honor of its 25th anniversary.

=== Cold War (1946–1991) ===
During the post-war era, it was renamed the Tbilisi Red Banner Mountain Artillery School in 1946 and to the Tbilisi Red Banner Artillery School on October 8, 1956, by order of the Commander-in-Chief of the Ground Forces Rodion Malinovsky. The school received the Commemorative Banner of the Central Committee of the Communist Party of the Soviet Union, the Presidium of the Supreme Soviet, and the Council of Ministers of the USSR on October 20, 1967. It achieved higher educational status on June 1, 1969. It received a high-profile inspection by Defense Minister Andrei Grechko in May 1971, and received the Jubilee Honorary Badge "50 Years of the USSR" in 1972. On December 2, 1980, the academy was awarded the Order of the Red Star. The academy's legacy was documented in a 1985 issue of the Soviet Warrior newsreel titled "Born in the Fire of Battle," and the institution held its final graduation ceremony for lieutenants in Tbilisi on June 23, 1991.

=== Relocation ===
In 1992, the Tbilisi Higher Artillery Command School was moved and reorganized into the Ekaterinburg Higher Artillery Command School in Yekaterinburg, Russia by order of the Supreme Commander of the United Armed Forces of the Commonwealth of Independent States Yevgeny Shaposhnikov. Throughout mid-January 1992, Soviet military transport aircraft evacuated the student body from Tbilisi; third and fourth-year cadets were reassigned to the Leningrad and Kolomenskoye Higher Artillery Schools, while first and second-year cadets were flown to Yekaterinburg. The remaining military personnel permanently vacated the Tbilisi campus on August 25, 1992. While the facility's weapons, military equipment, and heavy property were transferred to Transcaucasian Military District warehouses. Its original Battle Banner was transferred to the newly formed school and was ultimately converted into the Yekaterinburg Artillery Institute on August 29, 1998. The alumni of the school established the Association of Graduates of the Tbilisi Artillery School on August 26, 2000.

== Aspects of the school ==
It has the honorific of 26 Baku Commissars, with its full name being the Tbilisi Higher Artillery Command School named after the 26 Baku Commissars. Graduates of the school were distributed into artillery units of the Soviet Ground Forces, the Soviet Naval Infantry and the Soviet airborne. In 1965, the school, opened a military parade on Rustaveli Avenue in honor of the 20th anniversary of the end of the Second World War. During the Soviet–Afghan War, 50-75% of all cadets were deployed to Afghanistan. In August 2000, an alumni association was created, with 1971 graduate Ilya Novzhilov at its head.

== Notable alumni ==
- Museyib Allahverdiyev, Red Army major from Azerbaijan.
- Vladimir Arshba, the first Minister of Defence of the Republic of Abkhazia.
- Hamazasp Babadzhanian, a Soviet Armenian Chief marshal of the armored troops.
- Giorgi Karkarashvili, Georgian Minister of Defense from May 1993 to March 1994
- Yuri Khatchaturov, former Secretary-General of the Collective Security Treaty Organization and former Chief of the General Staff of the Armed Forces of Armenia.
- Oleg Bazhenov, Deputy Minister of EMERCOM.
- Ginutis Taurinskas, Soviet Lithuanian major general and head of the DOSAAF of the Lithuanian SSR.

== See also ==
- Baku Higher All-Arms Command School
- TVOKU
- National Defense Academy (Georgia)
