= Vladimir Anua =

Abkhaz politician and army general (born 1957)

Hero of Abkhazia Vladimir Anua

Minister of Defence of Abkhazia
- In office 1 June 2020 – 5 May 2026
- President: Aslan Bzhania; Badra Gunba
- Prime Minister: Alexander Ankvab; Valeri Bganba; Vladimir Delba
- Preceded by: Mirab Kishmaria
- Succeeded by: Beslan Tsvizhba

Personal details
- Born: 2 January 1957 (age 69) Tamysh (Ochamchira District), Georgian SSR, Soviet Union

Military service
- Allegiance: Soviet Union (1975-1977); Abkhazia (1992–present)
- Branch/service: Abkhazian Armed Forces
- Years of service: 1992-present
- Rank: Colonel General
- Commands: Eastern Front of Abkhazia

Vladimir Anua (Georgian: ვლადიმირ ანუა, Russian: Владимир Ануа; born 2 January 1957) is an Abkhaz politician and army general who served as the Minister of Defence of the disputed Republic of Abkhazia from 2020 to 2026.

== Early life ==
Anua was born on 2 January 1957 in the village of Tamysh, then part of the Georgian SSR in the Soviet Union. After graduating from secondary school, Anua worked at the oil plant in his hometown of Tamysh for a year before doing his mandatory service in the Soviet Army from 1975 to 1977. Other sources say he graduated in 1976 from the state farm-technical school of Achigvar and did his mandatory service afterward. After this, he returned back to Tamysh, and continued to work at the village's oil plant as an agronomist until 1986. Simultaneously, he attended the Georgian Institute of Subtropical Farming, where he graduated in 1988 with a specialisation as an agronomist. In either 1985 or 1987, he became head of the administration of the village of Tamysh, a position he held until 1992.

== Military career ==
After the start of the War in Abkhazia in 1992, Anua rejoined the military, becoming part of the Abkhazian Armed Forces. During the year-long war, he served as Chief of Staff and later Commander of the 1st Regiment of the Eastern Front. After the war ended and the Republic of Abkhazia became de facto independent, Anua served in a variety of roles within the Abkhazian military. These included: Deputy Commander, Commander of the Eastern Group of Forces, Deputy Minister of Defence, and Chief Military Inspector. During the brief 1998 Gali clashes, he was awarded the rank of Major General for his actions and participation, and in 2018 was later awarded the rank of Colonel General.

== Minister of Defence ==
On 1 June 2020, Anua was appointed Minister of Defence of Abkhazia under then President Aslan Bzhania, replacing the longtime minister Mirab Kishmaria. During Anua's tenure, the budget for the military doubled from 2020 to 2024, and the military also started to deploy unmanned aerial vehicles. However, Anua also said that the Abkhaz military needed deep modernisation, as he said the country would likely not be able to withstand challenges if it could not, with Anua citing the then ongoing Second Nagorno-Karabakh War as an example. Anua was eventually replaced as Minister of Defence by Beslan Tsvizhba in May 2026. Tsvizhba was First Deputy Minister of Defence prior to the appointment.

== Personal life ==
He is married and has three children.

== Honours and awards ==
Anua has been awarded the honourific title of Hero of Abkhazia.

Political offices
Preceded by Mirab Kishmaria	Minister of Defence; 2020-2026	Next: Beslan Tsvizhba
