= Abkhazian Navy =

- Военно-морские силы Республики Абхазия
- Naval Ensign
- Founded: 1992
- Country: Abkhazia
- Branch: Abkhazian Armed Forces
- Type: Navy
- Role: Naval defense of Abkhazia
- Size: 600 sailors
- Headquarters: Sukhumi, Ochamchire, and Pitsunda
- Equipment: BMP-2; SPG-9; KS-19
- Engagements: Abkhaz–Georgian conflict

Commanders
- Notable commanders: Aleksander Voinsky

The Abkhazian Navy is an operational-strategic formation of the Abkhazian Armed Forces, with its headquarters located in the vicinity of Sukhumi lighthouse. Its primary mission is to ensure the security of the self-proclaimed state of Abkhazia on the Black Sea coast. The Navy consists of littoral combat boats, a battalion of marines, parts of coastal troops and special forces. Joint exercises are often held with the Russian Navy.

On December 23, 2014, the Parliament of Abkhazia ratified the Treaty on Alliance and Strategic Partnership with the Russian Federation. In accordance with the agreement, the main areas of cooperation are: conducting a coordinated foreign policy and common space of defense and security, promoting socio-economic development, and creating conditions for the full participation of Abkhazia in the post-Soviet era.

== History and present role ==
Tensions had long existed between Abkhaz nationalists and ethnic Georgians under Soviet rule, leading to the 1989 Sukhumi riots. In the aftermath of the dissolution of the Soviet Union, Abkhazia remained as part of newly-independent Georgia. Tensions over autonomy demands led to the Abkhazian government proclaiming the independence of the region on 23 July 1992. On 14 August, Georgian police and National Guard units were dispatched to restore government control over Abkhazia, which marked the commencement of the war in Abkhazia. On 15 August, a marine tugboat was sent from Novorossiysk, Russia to Ochamchire to tow a decommissioned ship that had been sold to Turkey for scrap. As Georgian forces recaptured Ochamchire, the tug was seized and incorporated into the Georgian Navy.

Two days later, a group organized by long-distance navigator Levan Katiba brought a number of vessels across the Gumista River. In Gudauta, the formation of a fleet was organized by Kuchkan Enik, who served from 29 August as head of the coast guard. By order of Colonel Sosnaliev, who was the Chief of Staff of the State Committee for Defense, Enik was given the right to appoint specialists and take sea boats throughout the Gudauta District. In September, Katiba began to form the Navy in the city of Pitsunda from floating seacraft, which at that time were in the hands of local Abkhaz militias. It originally consisted of 25 sailors, with Katiba being the first commander. Abkhaz sailors had a role in blocking the naval communications of the Georgian Armed Forces during the War in Abkhazia (1992–1993). On 20 September 1993, a Tu-154 was shot down from a boat by a gunner of the Atar Battalion. A day later, a Tupolev Tu-134 passenger plane flying from Sochi was shot down over the sea (killing 22 civilians and 5 crew members, including journalists from Russia and the European Union) and the day after, two Tu-154 planes carrying Georgian Special Forces personnel from Tbilisi were shot down by the Ablhaz fleet. The Komsomolets of Abkhazia and Sukhum carried out humanitarian transport to Sochi for Abkhaz refugees as part of a POW exchange program. On 12 November 1992, personnel of the Gudauta Coast Guard Base began to be deployed to the main naval base while transferring a boat and a Project 343ME Volga glider at the same time.

On 19 December 1992, Katiba, began to address issues related to the replenishment of equipment, staffing of ships as well as ship documentation and launched a working group to address these needs for the young navy. The interim acting commander of the navy became Raul Nanba, who until then had served as midshipman in the Russian Navy. Raul Nanba resigned from his duties in January 1993. Captain Alexander Voinsky was appointed to this position, with Yuri Achba, a former commander of a nuclear submarine of the Soviet Navy's Northern Fleet, serving as chief of staff. In July of that year, Captain Ali Aliyev, a retired Dagestani graduate of the Caspian Higher Naval School in Baku.

Further development of the navy was associated with the purchase of disarmed or decommissioned boats post-Soviet states. the countries of the former USSR. Until 2001, there were 9 fishing trawlers in the Sukhumi Naval Division. Between June and August 2004, the Navy of Abkhazia replenished four artillery boats from the 116th River Ship Brigade (located in Izmail) of the Black Sea Fleet, purchased with funds from the Abkhazian diaspora. In early September 2009, President Sergey Bagapsh ordered the navy "to destroy" Georgian Navy ships near the maritime border of Abkhazia. On 23 December 2014, the Parliament of Abkhazia ratified a treaty between Abkhazia and the Russian Federation, which laid the foundation for naval cooperation.

As of October 5, 2023, Russia has signed a deal for a permanent naval base on the Abkhazian coast prompting criticism from Georgia.

== Organization ==
The Navy of Abkhazia is divided into three divisions, with the naval headquarters being located in the Sukhumi Lighthouse Area. The main fleet bases are located in Sukhumi, Ochamchire, Pitsunda. The number of sailors in the navy numbers more than 600 people. The composition of the Navy includes:

- 1st Division (Sukhumi)
- 2nd Division (Pitsunda)
- 3rd Division (Ochamchire)
- Marine Battalion – It currently consists of 350-400 sailors.
- Three coastal defense batteries *Unguided aircraft rocket installation
- Special Unit "Night Angels"
- Special Unit "Fighting Swimmers"
- Three stationary radar installations

== Commanders ==
- Levan Katiba (September–December 1992)
- Captain 1st Rank Raul Nanba (December 1992-January 1993
- Captain 1st Rank Aleksander Voinsky (January 1993 – 2001)
- Captain 1st Rank Zurab Gitsba
- Captain 1st Rank Aleksander Voinsky (7 July 2005 – 2009)
