= Vladimir Arshba =

Abkhaz politician (1959-2018)

- Владимир Аршба

1st Minister of Defence of Abkhazia
- In office 11 October 1992 – 25 April 1993
- President: Vladislav Ardzinba
- Preceded by: Position established
- Succeeded by: Sultan Sosnaliyev

Personal details
- Born: 1 May 1959 Tbilisi, Georgian SSR, Soviet Union
- Died: 16 January 2018 (aged 58) Sukhumi, Abkhazia/Georgia

Vladimir Georgievich Arshba (Russian: Владимир Георгиевич Аршба; 8 May 1959 – 16 January 2018) was an Abkhaz soldier and politician who served as the first Minister of Defence of the Republic of Abkhazia, an unrecognised state, from 1992 until 1993. He held the rank of Lieutenant general in the Abkhazian Armed Forces.

== Career ==
Arshba graduated from the Tbilisi Higher Artillery Command School in 1980 and served with the Soviet Army in East Germany. In 1988 he was transferred to the Armenian SSR, and helped in the aftermath of the 1988 Armenian earthquake. Transferred again in 1989, this time to the Abkhaz ASSR, Arshba was there during the 1992–1993 war against Georgia. As a colonel he was appointed the first Minister of Defence in 1992, but left the post in 1993 for health reasons.

Arshba was the running mate (for vice president) for presidential candidate Sergei Shamba during the 2004 Abkhazian presidential election.

He later served as an adviser to the President of Abkhazia, and head of the State Migration Services from 2009 to 2015.

Arshba played a big role in the Ethnic cleansing of Georgians in Abkhazia specifically in Gagra, where he apparently raped a 14-year old Georgian girl and ordered her execution briefly after.
