= Independence Day (South Ossetia) =

State holiday in South Ossetia

Independence Day of South Ossetia
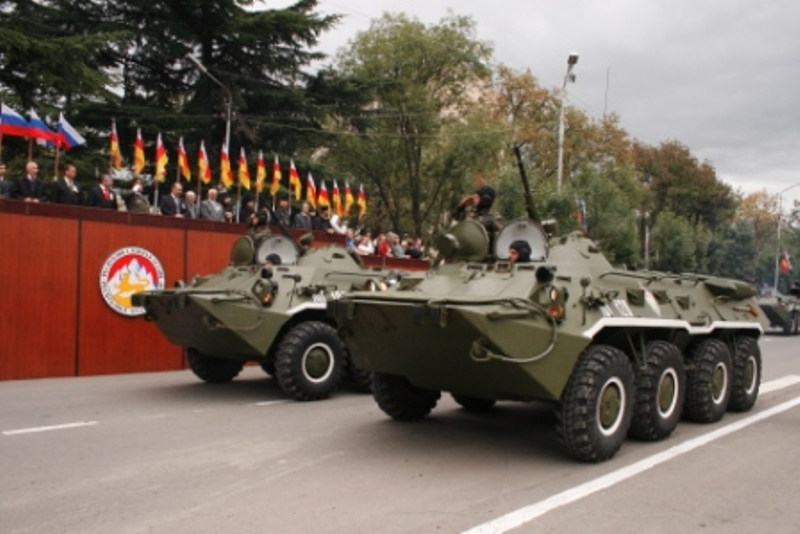
- Armoured hardware during the 2009 parade.
- Official name: День независимости Южной Осетии; Хуссар Ирыстоны Хӕдбарады бон
- Observed by: South Ossetia
- Significance: Declaration of Independence of South Ossetia (1990)
- Celebrations: Military parade; Concerts; Traditional Festivals; Speeches by Ossetian and Russian officials
- Date: September 20
- Next time: September 20, 2026
- Frequency: annual
- Related to: Victory Day (9 May); Day of recognition of independence of South Ossetia by Russia (26 August)

Independence Day (Russian: День независимости; Ossetian: Хӕдбарады бон) or Republic Day is the main state holiday in the partially recognized Republic of South Ossetia. This date is celebrated on September 20. It commemorates South Ossetia's declaration of independence from the Georgian SSR in 1990, and the country's recognition as a sovereign state by Russia in 2008.

== Background ==
South Ossetia first declared its independence from Georgia in 1920 following the Russian Revolution in Russia. After the Soviet Army invaded Georgia in 1921, the government declared South Ossetia an autonomous region within the Georgian SSR. On September 20, 1990, the Council of People's Deputies of the South Ossetian Autonomous Oblast adopted a declaration of sovereignty of the new republic. In 1992 proclaimed South Ossetia proclaimed independence. In August 2008, South Ossetia was recognized by Russia, Venezuela, Nauru, and Nicaragua, other unrecognized counties such as Artsakh, Abkhazia and Transnistria following the week long Russo-Georgian War of 2008.

== Events held on this day ==
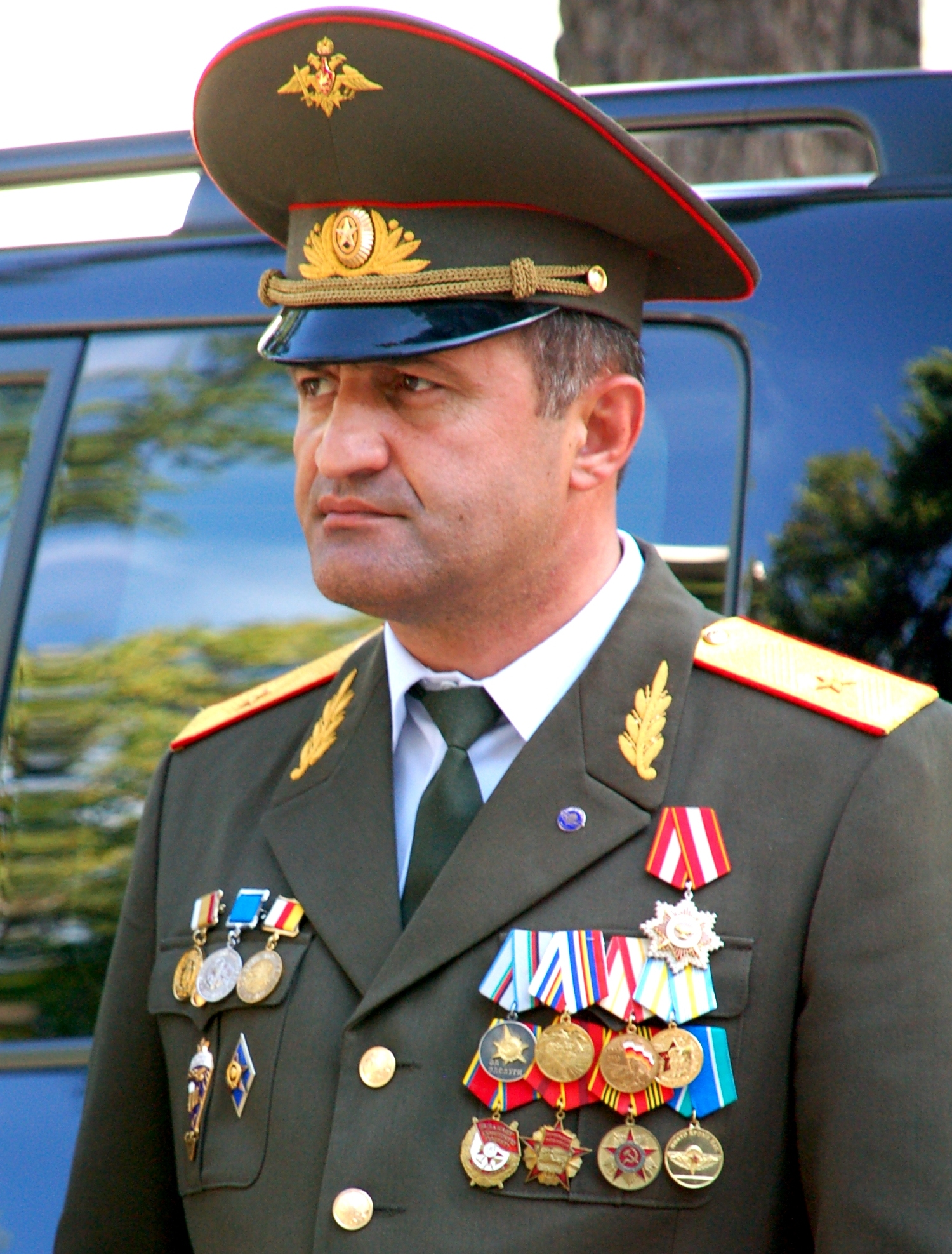
Anatoly Bibilov in military uniform during the republic day celebrations in 2010.

Events on this day are planned by the national government. An annual military parade is held on Theatre Square as the main holiday event. The parade involves the ceremonial review of the troops of the Tskhinvali Garrison by the Minister of Defense, a speech by the President of South Ossetia, the playing of the national anthem by the Military Brass Band of the Ministry of Defense. and the parade of the Armed Forces of South Ossetia past the central grandstand. The Honour Guard Company is the ceremonial unit of the armed forces. The Honour Guard Company conducted a drill performance during the 2019 parade for the first time. After the marchpast, demonstrations and traditional Ossetian events are held.

Concerts are also held in stadiums and music centers in the capital and throughout the country.

=== Notable anniversaries ===
- 1990 – The Council of People's Deputies of the South Ossetian Autonomous Oblast adopts the Declaration of Independence of South Ossetia.
- 2008 – The country celebrates its first independence day since its recognition as a sovereign state by the government of the Russian Federation 4 weeks earlier. The parade involved Georgian armored vehicles, including Turkish-made wheeled light armored vehicles, taken from retreating Georgian forces during the August war. Following the parade, Georgian flags were thrown to the ground by South Ossetian militiamen, resembling how Soviet soldiers threw German flags on Red Square during the Moscow Victory Parade of 1945.
- 2012 - The Russian Centre for Science and Culture was opened. The Radio Station "Echo of the Caucasus" reported that Theatre Square hosted a concert with the participation of artistic groups such as the Krasnodar Brass Band. The parade was attended by President of Nauru Sprent Dabwido, who delivered a speech at the ceremony.
- 2018 – Marked the 10th anniversary of recognition by Russia. More than 2,000 residents took part in a theatrical performance, headlined "South Ossetia: the story of courage," that looked into the republic’s history from the Medieval Kingdom of Alania to present day. The celebrations were attended by representatives of the Donetsk People's Republic and Luhansk People's Republic, as well as Syria’s ambassador to Russia Riad Haddad and parliamentary delegations from Nauru, Italy and Abkhazia.
- 2020 – Marked the 30th anniversary of the declaration of independence. For the first time in Tskhinvali, the parade saw a contingent from the Abkhazian Armed Forces march on the square.

== See also ==
- Republic Day of Transnistria
- Public holidays in South Ossetia
- International recognition of Abkhazia and South Ossetia
- Russia–South Ossetia relations

== Videos ==
- Военный парад на День Республики Южная Осетия
