= Sultan Sosnaliyev =

Soviet-Abkhazian military officer (1942-2008)

Soslan Sosnaliyev
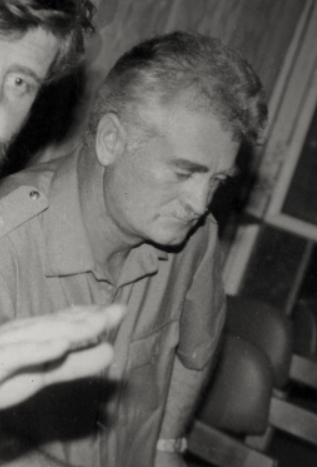
- Sosnaliyev in 1993

2nd & 7th Minister of Defence of Abkhazia
- In office February 2005 – May 2007
- President: Sergei Bagapsh
- Preceded by: Mukhamed Kilba
- Succeeded by: Mirab Kishmaria
- In office April 1993 – July 1996
- President: Vladislav Ardzinba
- Preceded by: Vladimir Arshba
- Succeeded by: Vladimir Mikanba

Personal details
- Born: 23 April 1942 Baksan, Kabardino-Balkar ASSR, Soviet Union
- Died: 23 November 2008 (aged 66) Moscow, Russia

Military service
- Allegiance: Soviet Union (1961–1989); Abkhazia (1992–2007)
- Branch/service: Soviet Army; Abkhazian Armed Forces
- Years of service: 1961–1989; 1992–1996; 2005–2007
- Rank: Colonel (Soviet Union); Lieutenant general (Abkhazia)
- Battles/wars: War in Abkhazia

Sultan Aslambekovich Sosnaliyev (Russian: Султан Асламбекович Сосналиев; 23 April 1942 – 23 November 2008) was a Soviet Army officer of Circassian ethnicity who served as a commander of Abkhaz and North Caucasian forces during the War in Abkhazia and as the defence minister of Abkhazia in 1993–1996 and 2005–2007.

== Early life ==
Sultan Sosnaliyev was born in Baksan in Kabardino-Balkaria, Russia, to Kabardin parents. He graduated from the Syzran Higher Military Aviation School and from the Zhukov Air and Space Defense Academy and served in the Soviet anti-aircraft forces for 29 years. He retired in 1990 in the rank of a colonel and worked in Kabardino-Balkaria's construction industry till 1992.

== Role in the War in Abkhazia ==
Sosnaliyev became the head of the military department of the newly formed Confederation of Mountain Peoples of the Caucasus. After the beginning of the War in Abkhazia he arrived to Abkhazia with the group of Kabardin volunteers through on 15 August 1992. He was appointed the head of the staff of the Gudauta-based State Committee of the Defence and was one of the planners of the victorious Battle of Gagra.

He was appointed the minister of defence in April 1993 and later awarded the rank of Major General. Sosnaliyev and Sergei Dbar planned the July and September Sukhumi offensives. On 24–25 March 1994 Sosnaliyev was in charge of the last operation of the war—the capture of the village of Lata in the Kodori Valley.

== Post-war life ==
Sosnaliyev resigned in July 1996 and returned to Kabardino-Balkaria. After Sergei Bagapsh had been elected the President of Abkhazia he offered the office of the minister of defense to Sosnaliyev as "reforms were desperately needed" in the Abkhazian army. The latter agreed and served in the Abkhazian government as a minister of defense and a vice-premier until May 2007.

== Honours and awards ==
- Order of the Red Banner
- Title Honoured Military Pilot of the USSR
- Title "Hero of Abkhazia"
- Order "Honor and Glory" (Abkhazia)

== Sources ==
- Полководец Султан Сосналиев, Commander Sultan Sosnaliyev from the official site of the President of Abkhazia
