= Mirab Kishmaria =

Abkhaz politician and army general

Mirab Kishmaria Мираб Кишьмариа
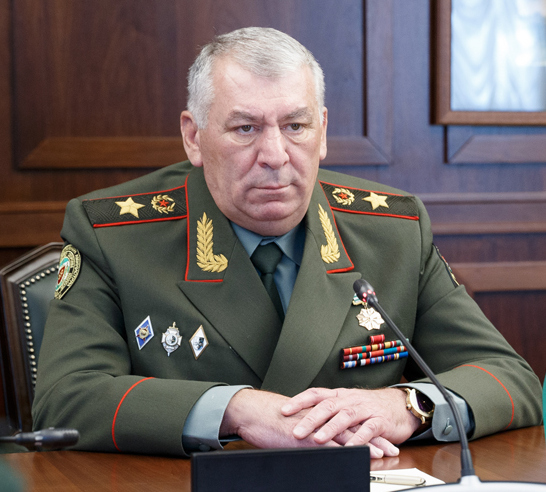

Minister of Defence
- In office 10 May 2007 – 1 June 2020
- Prime Minister: Alexander Ankvab; Sergei Shamba; Leonid Lakerbaia; Vladimir Delba (Acting)
- Preceded by: Sultan Sosnaliyev
- Succeeded by: Vladimir Anua

Personal details
- Born: 3 August 1961 (age 64) Ochamchira District, Georgian SSR, Soviet Union
- Party: Independent

Military service
- Allegiance: Soviet Union (1987–1989); Abkhazia (1992–present)
- Branch/service: Abkhazian Armed Forces
- Years of service: 1987–present
- Rank: General of the Army
- Commands: Eastern Front of Abkhazia
- Battles/wars: Soviet-Afghan War; Siege of Tkvarcheli

Mirab Boris-ipa Kishmaria (Abkhaz: Мираб Борис-иҧа Кишьмариа, Georgian: მერაბ ქიშმარია, Russian: Мира́б Бори́сович Кишма́рия) is a former Abkhaz politician and army general who served as the Minister of Defence of the disputed Republic of Abkhazia from 2015 until 2020.

== Early life and career ==
Mirab Kishmaria was born 3 August 1961 in Ochamchire in what was then the Abkhazian Autonomous Soviet Socialist Republic. In 1984 he graduated from the Alma-Ata Higher Combined Arms Command School. From June 1987 until February 1989 Kishmaria fought with the 40th division of the Soviet army in Afghanistan. During the 1992–1993 War in Abkhazia, Kishmaria was commander of the eastern front of the Abkhazian army, in the Ochamchire district.

== Political career ==
In 2002, Kishmaria became co-chairman of the influential veteran movement Amtsakhara, together with Vladimir Nachach.

On 22 March 2005 Mirab Kishmaria was appointed First Deputy Minister of Defence. After Sultan Sosnaliyev resigned as Defence Minister on 8 May 2007, Kishmaria became acting Minister of Defence on 10 May. He was appointed permanently to the post on 26 June.

== Family ==
Mirab Kishmaria is married to a Georgian wife, they have 11 children. Out of these, seven fought in the 1992–1993 war with Georgia, and two died therein.

== Sources ==
- Лакоба, Станислав (2004). "Абхазия после двух империй XIX—XXI вв." // 21st Century COE Program Slavic Eurasian Studies — No. 5. Sapporo: Slavic Research Center, Hokudai University.

Political offices
Preceded by Sultan Sosnaliyev	Minister of Defence; 2007–present	Incumbent
