= Viacheslav Eshba =

Abkhaz military officer and politician (1949–2023)

Minister for Defence of Abkhazia
- In office 22 April 2003 – 8 November 2004
- Preceded by: Raul Khajimba
- Succeeded by: Mukhamed Kilba

Personal details
- Born: Viacheslav Akhmetovich Eshba; 13 March 1949 Duripshi, Gudauta District, Abkhaz ASSR, Georgian SSR, USSR
- Died: 26 August 2023 (aged 74)
- Education: Leningrad Academy of Civil Aviation
- Occupation: Military officer

Viacheslav Akhmetovich Eshba (Russian: Вячеслав Ахметович Эшба; 13 March 1949 – 26 August 2023) was an Abkhaz military officer and politician. He served as Minister for Defence of Abkhazia from 2003 to 2004.

Eshba died on 26 August 2023, at the age of 74.
