= Public holidays in South Ossetia =

Official holidays in the partially recognized state of South Ossetia (Georgia)

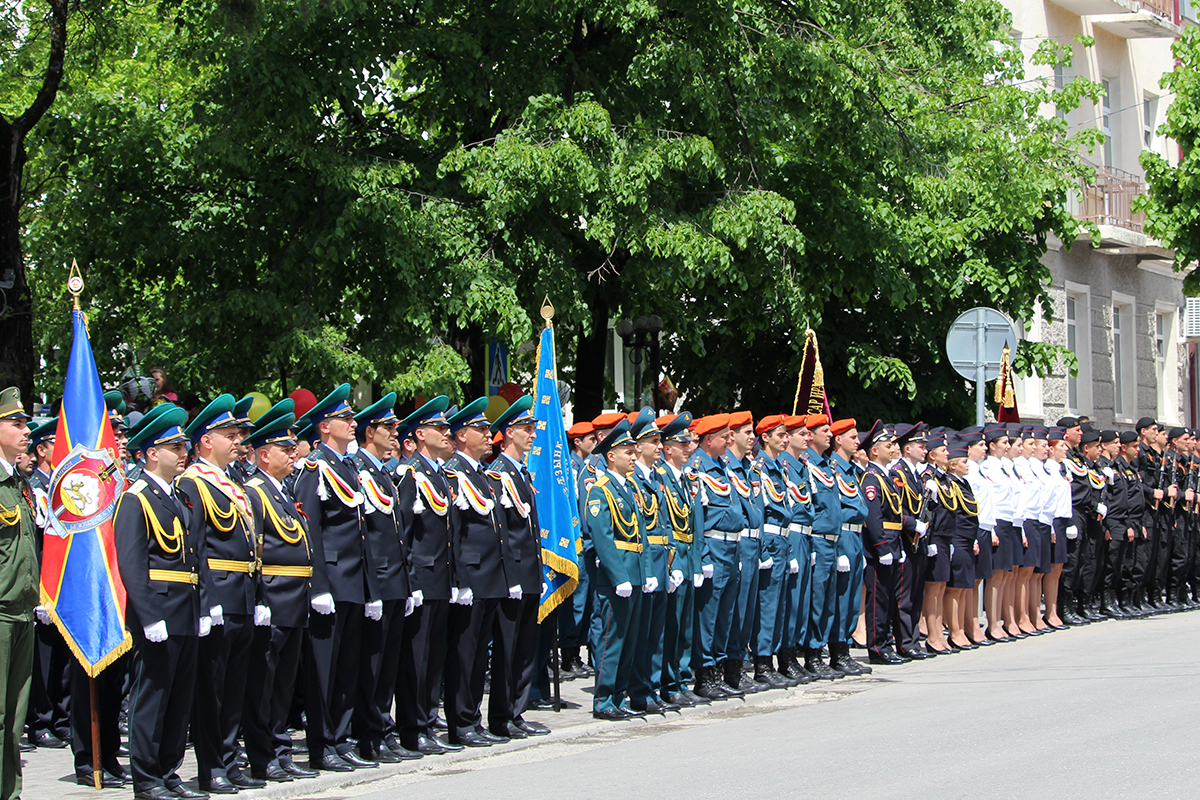
Victory Day in Tskhinvali 2018.

Public holidays in South Ossetia lists the official public holidays recognized by the South Ossetian government. On these days, government offices, offices of foreign missions (such as the Russian Embassy in South Ossetia) and some shops, are closed.

== Official Holidays ==
Date	English name	Ossetian name	Russian name	Remarks
1 – 2 January	New Year's Day		Новый год	
7 January	Orthodox Christmas		Рождество	
23 February	Defender of the Fatherland Day		День защитника Отечества	Celebrates the founding of the Armed Forces of South Ossetia.
8 March	International Women's Day		Международный женский день	
8 April	Constitution Day		День Конституции	
1 May	Labor Day		День труда	
9 May	Victory Day		День Победы	On 9 May 1945, Nazi Germany was defeated and the Second World War came to an end in Europe.
29 May	Day of the Declaration of Independence of the Republic of South Ossetia		День Декларации независимости Республики Южной Осетии	
12 June	Russia Day		День России	This day commemorates the adoption of the Declaration of State Sovereignty of the Russian Soviet Federative Socialist Republic.
27 June	South Ossetian Youth Day		Южно-Осетинский день молодежи	
26 August	Day of recognition of independence of South Ossetia by Russia		День признания независимости Южной Осетии Россией	
20 September	Independence Day		День независимости Южной Осетии	
23 November	Day of Courage and National Unity		День мужества и народного единства	
