= Emblem of the Abkhaz Autonomous Soviet Socialist Republic =

- Armiger: Abkhaz Autonomous Soviet Socialist Republic
- Adopted: 2 August 1937
- Crest: Red star
- Supporters: Wheat and Cotton
- Motto: (clockwise) პროლეტარებო ყველა ქვეყნისა, შეერთდით! (Georgian); Пролетарии всех стран, соединяйтесь! (Russian) (1937–1938) (1938–1954) აპროლეარცჿა ატჿჷლაქუა ზეგჲჷ რჭჾა იყოუ, შჿჩჾეიდჷშჿკჷლ! (1954–1992); Атәылақуа зегьы рпролетарцәа, шәҽеидышәкыл! (Abkhaz) "Workers of the world, unite!"

The national emblem of the Abkhaz Autonomous Soviet Socialist Republic was adopted in 1937 by the government of the Abkhaz Autonomous Soviet Socialist Republic. The emblem is identical to the emblem of the Georgian Soviet Socialist Republic.

== History ==
The first emblem of the Abkhaz ASSR was defined in the Constitution of the Abkhaz ASSR. The constitution was adopted on August 2, 1937, by the 8th All-Abkhaz Congress of Soviets. The emblem was described in the Article 111 of the constitution:

The national emblem of the Abkhaz Autonomous Soviet Socialist Republic is the national emblem of the Georgian SSR, which consists of a round red field, in the upper part of which is a luminous five-pointed star with rays extending all over the field, on the right is a blue snowy ridge; golden ears and on the left - golden vines with vines. The ends of the ears and vines intertwined at the base of the ridge in the lower part of the field. Most of the middle is occupied by images golden sickles and hammers that abut: at the top - at a luminous star, at the bottom - at the top of the ridge, and on the sides - at the ears and vines. Around the field there is an inscription in Georgian, Abkhaz and Russian languages: "Proletarians of all countries, unite!" edged around with a pattern of Georgian-style ornaments.

— Constitution of the Abkhaz ASSR (1937), Article 111

Originally the Abkhaz Soviet Socialist Republic in 1925 used a gold hammer and sickle with an Abkhaz background and Abkhaz language "Abkhaz SSR" as its emblem. This was despite Russian being the sole official language of the Abkhaz SSR. A year later, it was amended to amend the textual references in the emblem by having them written in Abkhaz, Georgian and Russian around the emblem due to the lack of space. In 1931, the Abkhaz SSR was relegated to the status of an autonomous republic within the Soviet Union and ceased using its emblem.

The emblem was identical to the emblem of the Georgian Soviet Socialist Republic except the "Workers of the world, unite!" motto was in Abkhaz, Georgian and Russian opposed to just Georgian and Russian. The Ab. ASSR was written in Cyrillic and Georgian opposed to just Georgian scripts.

=== First revision ===
In 1938, the Abkhaz writing script switched to the Georgian script. The inscriptions on the emblem also changed accordingly.

=== Second revision ===
In 1954, the Abkhaz writing script switched to the Cyrillic script. The inscriptions on the emblem also changed accordingly.

=== Third revision ===
In accordance with the new Constitution of the Abkhaz ASSR adopted on July 6, 1978, an inscription was added to its coat of arms in two lines “საქ. სსრ” in Georgian (top) and "Аҧ. АССР" in Abkhaz language. The emblem was described in Article 159 of the Constitution :

The state emblem of the Abkhaz Autonomous Soviet Socialist Republic is the state emblem of the Georgian SSR, which is a circle, in the upper part of which, on a red background, is a luminous five-pointed star with divergent rays; below - a snow-covered blue ridge with a snowy peak protruding in the middle; in the lower part of the circle there are depicted: on the right - a golden vine with a bunch of grapes, on the left - three golden ears, the ends of the ears and the vines intertwine with each other at the lower edge of the circle; most of the middle is occupied by images of the golden sickle and hammer, which abut: at the top - at the diverging rays of the star, at the bottom - at the top of the ridge, and on the sides - at the ears and the vine; under the hammer and sickle there is an inscription: საქ. სსრ, under it is the inscription: Аҧ. АССР; the circle is framed by a border with a pattern of Georgian ornaments, on the inner ring of which, on a white background, is an inscription in three languages - Abkhazian, Georgian and Russian: “Proletarians of all countries, unite!” delimited by three small asterisks.

— Constitution of the Abkhaz ASSR (1978), Article 159

== Gallery ==
1954–1978

1978–1992

== See also ==
- Flag of the Abkhaz Autonomous Soviet Socialist Republic
- Emblem of Abkhazia
- Emblem of the Georgian Soviet Socialist Republic
