= Abkhazian Air Force =

Air force of the Republic of Abkhazia

- Abkhazian Coat of arms
- Founded: 1992; 34 years ago
- Country: Abkhazia
- Type: Air force
- Role: Aerial warfare
- Size: 250 personnel (2001); 4 aircraft (2026)
- Part of: Abkhazian Armed Forces
- Anniversaries: 27 August (Aviation Day)
- Engagements: Abkhaz-Georgian War; 2008 South Ossetia war

Insignia
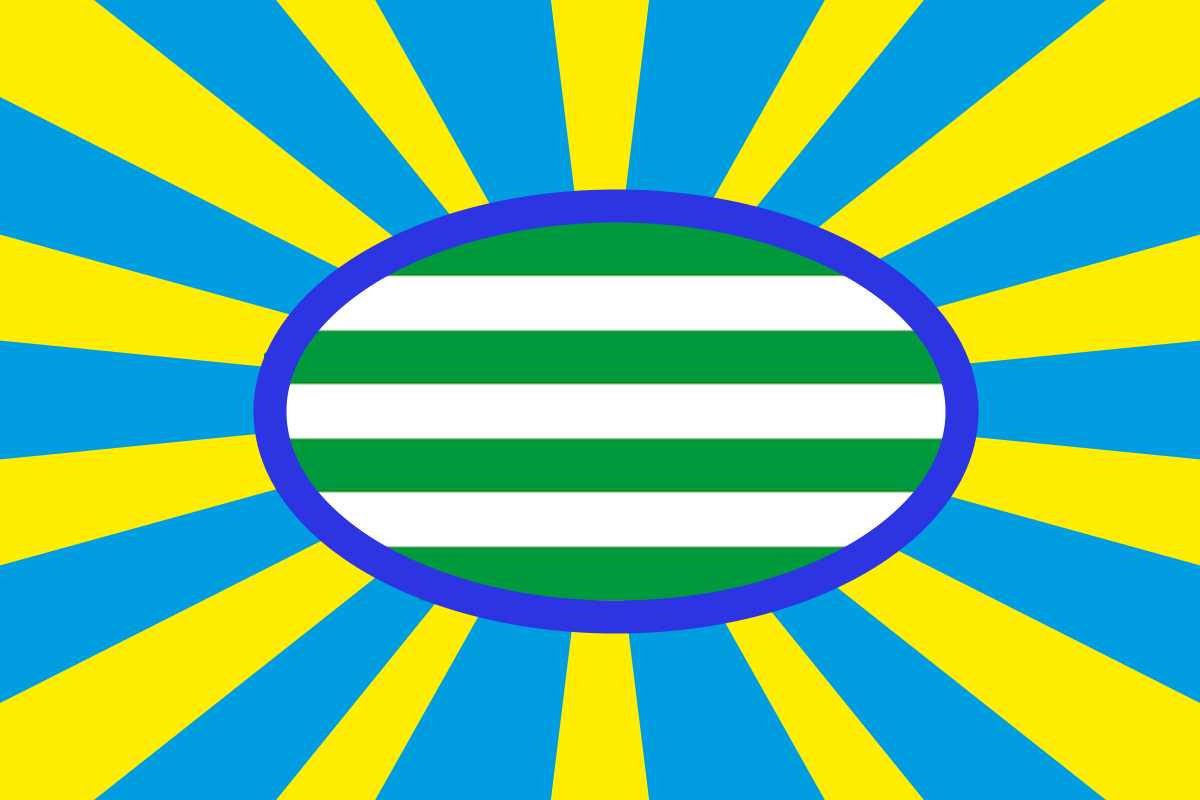
- Flag

Aircraft flown
- Helicopter: Mi-8
- Attack helicopter: Mi-24

The Abkhazian Air Force is a small air force, which is a part of the Abkhazian Armed Forces, operating from Abkhazia.

== History ==
Few details are available on its formation, but it is reported to have been established by Viyacheslav Eshba, originally operating several Yak-52 trainer aircraft armed with machine guns. Its first combat mission was conducted on 27 August 1992, which has come to be celebrated in Abkhazia as "Aviation Day." The Abkhaz Air Force claims to have made 400 operational flights during the 1992-1993 Abkhaz-Georgian war. Abkhaz combat losses during the civil war are uncertain, but include a Yak-52 on a reconnaissance mission near Sukhumi on 4 July 1993.

In the autumn of 2001, Abkhazia's air force was reported to comprise 250 personnel, 1 Su-25, 2 L-39, 1 Yak-52, and 2 Mi-8. The display of three L-39s at a parade in 2004 suggests a possible recent acquisition. In February 2007, a Russian website reported that Abkhazia has 2 Su-27 fighters, 1 Yak-52, 2 Su-25 attack aircraft, 2 L-39 combat trainers, 1 An-2 light transport, 7 Mi-8 helicopters, and 3 Mi-24 helicopters. However, an undated 2007 Abkhaz source gave the inventory for the Abkhazian Air Force as 16 MiG-21, 46 Su-25, 2 L-39, 1 Yak-52, and 2 Mi-8. In March 2008, a military aviation enthusiast website repeated this inventory but added 9 Mi-24/35 attack helicopters.

The World Air Forces 2015 publication (the first World Air Forces publication to list Abkhazian Air Force) listed the Abkhazian Air Force inventory as follows: 1 Mi-17, 2 Mi-35, 5 L-39. By World Air Forces 2016 these had changed to: 1 Mi-8, 2 Mi-24, 5 L-39.

In 2021, President Aslan Bzhania announced intentions to modernize the air force.

== Equipment ==
An accounting of exact types, quantities, and service dates for aircraft serving in the Abkhazian Air Force is difficult to accurately provide due to a number of factors: including Abkhazia's disputed status, a lack of official available information, multiple conflicts over the course of its existence, and the regular involvement of Russian aircraft & pilots in the conflicts and region. In general, the air force has relied on aircraft inherited from the former Soviet forces based in Abkhazia with possible reinforcement in recent years by Russia with second-hand aircraft. No traditional contracts for aircraft purchases by Abkhazia have been reported.

=== Aircraft ===
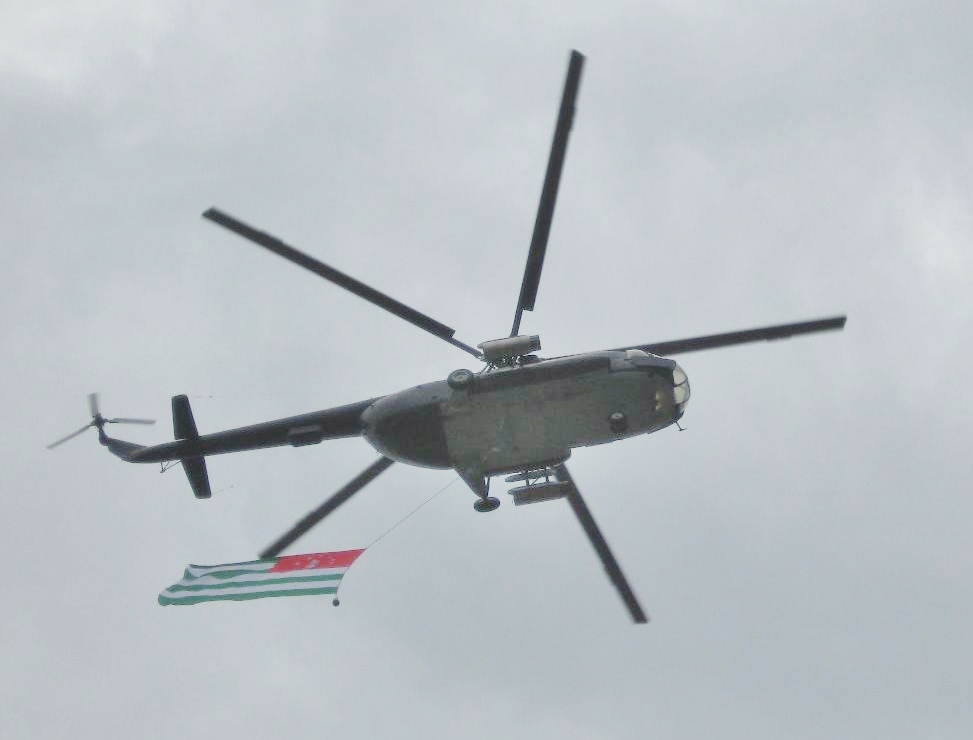
Mi-8 helicopter flying the Abkhazian flag

Aircraft	Origin	Type	Variant	In service	Notes
Helicopters
Mil Mi-8	Soviet Union Russia	Utility		2	
Mil Mi-24	Soviet Union Russia	Attack		2	

=== Retired aircraft ===
Aero L-39 Albatros, Antonov An-2, Mikoyan-Gurevich MiG-21, Sukhoi Su-25, Sukhoi Su-27, Yakovlev Yak-52.

== Aircraft markings ==
Several different markings have been reported.
