= Hero of Abkhazia =

- Type: Award
- Presented by: Abkhazia
- Eligibility: Abkhazian and foreign citizens
- First award: 4 December 1992
- Ribbon of the medal
- Related: Hero (title)

The Hero of Abkhazia (Abkhaz: Аҧсны афырхаца, romanized: Aṕsny Afyrhaca) is a state award of the Republic of Abkhazia. The title represents the highest military distinction within the de facto state. Established on 4 December 1992 during the Georgian–Abkhaz conflict, the title is conferred for acts of valor and exceptional service to the state and may be awarded to both citizens and foreign nationals. The accompanying medal features an eight-pointed gilded star with a central solar emblem and is worn above other national decorations. In addition to individual recipients, the cities of Tkvarcheli and Gudauta have been designated as Hero Cities for their roles in the conflict.

== History ==
The title and accompanying medal were established on 4 December 1992, during the early stages of the Georgian–Abkhaz conflict. It is awarded for acts of valor and exceptional service to the Republic of Abkhazia. The distinction can be granted posthumously and to foreign nationals who have contributed to Abkhazia's military efforts or national development.

== Description ==
The Hero of Abkhazia medal consists of an eight-pointed star made of gilded metal, with rays radiating from its center. A stylised convex solar emblem is featured at the center, set with a precious stone. The distance between opposing points of the star measures 35 millimeters. The reverse bears the inscription Аҧсны афырхаца, Aṕsny Afyrhaca, 'Hero of Abkhazia' in the Abkhaz language.

The medal is attached by a ring and eyelet to a quadrangular mount covered in a silk moiré ribbon composed of four green and three white horizontal stripes, which reflect elements of the Abkhazian national flag. It is worn on the left side of the chest, above other state orders and medals.

== Legacy ==
The Hero of Abkhazia title holds symbolic importance within Abkhazian national identity. It represents the highest military distinction within the de facto state. Recipients are often commemorated in public ceremonies and educational initiatives. Family members of deceased honorees may be invited to speak at schools, and memorials and plaques are erected in their honor. The decoration plays a role in shaping the historical narrative of the state's struggle for independence and is closely associated with the memory of the Georgian–Abkhaz conflict.

== Notable recipients ==
- Givi Agrba
- Shamil Basaev
- Vitaly Vulf
- Shamil Basayev
- Sultan Sosnaliyev
- Sergei Matosyan
- Ashot Kosyan
- Vladimir Anua

=== Cities ===
Two cities in Abkhazia were awarded the title of Hero of Abkhazia in the form of a Hero City:

- Tkvarcheli
- Gudauta
