= National Defence Academy (Georgia) =

The David Aghmashenebeli National Defence Academy (Georgian: დავით აღმაშენებლის ეროვნული თავდაცვის აკადემია, romanized: davit aghmasheneblis erovnuli tavdatsvis ak'ademia) also known commonly as the ETA is the main military institution for the educational training of senior officers in the Defence Forces of Georgia. It is a legal entity under the Ministry of Defence of Georgia. It is a LEPL (leading higher military Institution), which aims to indoctrinate officers with some of the highest academic and military education standards. The current rector of the ETA is Brigadier General Malkhaz Makaradze.

== History ==
The Georgian military education dates back to 1862 when the first military school was established in Tbilisi. On the occasion of Georgia obtaining its independence in 1918, the Commanders-in-Chief of the Democratic Republic of Georgia, Major General Giorgi Kvinitadze established the Georgian Junkers Military School". After the Red Army invasion of Georgia in early 1921, the school ceased to exist. During Bolshevik and Georgian Communist Party rule, the school was transformed into an institution of Red Army students, later being renamed to the Tbilisi Higher Artillery Command School, which was abolished in 1992 upon the restoration of independence. On 28 May 1993 based on the order of Defence Minister Giorgi Karkarashvili, the United Military Academy of the Republic of Georgia was created. It began operating on 1 September 1993. On 20 February 2003, the Academy was given the honorific prefix of "David Aghmashenebeli" (David IV of Georgia in English. Six years later, it changed its location to Gori, where it still operates today. In late 2010, the ETA underwent a new process for reforms, which included the NCEQE Council for the authorization of the ETA's status as the highest educational institution. The following year, it received support from the Georgia–Georgia National Guard Partnership.

== Student life ==
The length of studies at the ETA had been defined for 4 years. In 2005, due to the need for the growth of the personnel strength of the Georgian Armed Forces" the system of the Academy has been transformed to retain only the 18-month-long officer training courses. Upon entry into the academy, cadets sign a contract with the MoD for 10 years of military service, of which 4 years are dedicated to studies and 6 years of which is consequent military service. Cadets receive the rank of Lieutenant upon graduation. The students at the Academy were called "Listeners", which in 2014 was changed to "Junkers" in order to honour the original Junkers who died in service to the Democratic Republic of Georgia. The Academic Council is a governing body of NDA, with its authority being defined under the law "Regarding Higher Education". The tasks of the council include presenting the ETA and creating and approving internal legislation.

Since 2018, the ETA hosted a summer school known as "My World", with the support of the Embassy of the United States, Tbilisi.

== Structure ==
Currently, the departments are operating at the ETA:

- Leadership personnel
  - Rector
  - Deputy Rector
  - Deputy Rector
  - Head of Administration
- Quality Assurance Service
- Internal Audit Service
- International Relations Division
- Educational Service
- Bachelor School
- Command and General Staff College
- Junior Officer School
- Language Training School
- Examination Center
- Library
- Psychological Service Section
- Scientific Research Center
- Training Battalion
- Army Service Section
- Finance Management Division
- Procurement Section
- HR Management Section
- Public Relations Section
- Chancellory
- Legal Division
- Material and Technical Support Section
- Logistical Support Section
- Signals and Information Technology Section
- Medical Center
- Sports Complex

In September 2015, the ETA graduated its first class of baccalaureate school cadets.

== Notable alumni ==
- Giorgi Matiashvili, the incumbent Chief of Georgian Defence Forces.

== See also ==
- War College of the Azerbaijani Armed Forces
- Vazgen Sargsyan Military University
