= Gumista River =

Gumista გუმისთა
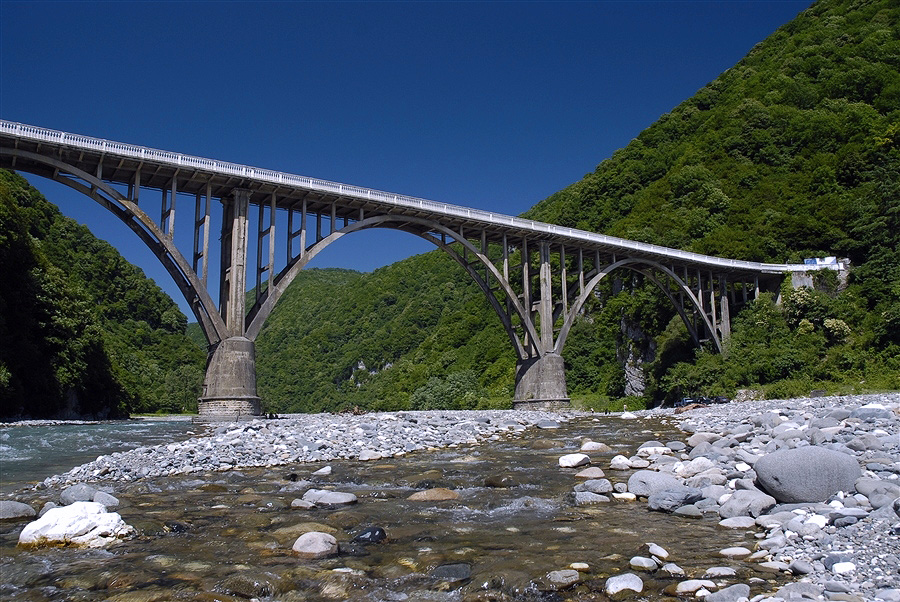

- Location within Abkhazia Location within Georgia

Location
- Country: (Georgia (country)) Georgia; Abkhazia

Physical characteristics
- Source
  - location: Caucasus Major
  - elevation: 83 m (272 ft)
- Mouth: Georgia; Abkhazia
  - location: Black Sea
  - coordinates: 43°05′18″N 41°00′10″E
  - elevation: 0 ft (0 m)
- Length: 12 km (7.5 mi)
- Basin size: 576 km^{2} (222 sq mi)
- Discharge
  - average: 30 m^{3}/s (1,100 cu ft/s)

The Gumista River (Georgian: გუმისთა, Abkhaz: Гәымсҭа) is a river in territory held by Abkhazia and claimed by Georgia. It is formed by the joining of the Eastern and Western Gumista Rivers. It is nourished by snow, rain and underground water. The river flows into the Black Sea. The length of the Gumista is 12 km and the drainage basin is approximately 576 km^{2}. The average annual discharge of the river is 30m³/s. The river was the site of conflict between Abkhazians and Georgians in the Soviet Union and during the War in Abkhazia, including the Battle of the Gumista.

== History ==
Mousterian sites were found in Eshera, which is along the right bank of the Gumista River.

A hydroelectricity station was constructed for the Gumista River after World War II.

In 1974, 76 hamadryas baboons from Ethiopia were released in the forest around Sukhumi and were supplied by a glade on the bank of the Gumista River.

In 1989, hundreds of Abkhazians and Georgians fought each other at the Gumista River, resulting in 16 deaths and 137 hospitalisations.

During the opening days of the War in Abkhazia the Georgians withdrew to the Abkhaz side of the Gumista River on 15 August 1992. On August 18 the Georgians occupied the other side of the river. The river served as a front line during the war and saw the Battle of the Gumista occur at it. Russian soldiers were sent to the river as a peacekeeping force. The river was declared free of land mines in 2006 after clearings were performed by the HALO Trust.

== Works cited ==
=== Books ===
- Shabad, Theodore (1951). Geography of the USSR: A Regional Survey. Columbia University Press.
- Shesterinina, Anastasia (2021). Mobilizing in Uncertainty: Collective Identities and War in Abkhazia. Cornell University Press. ISBN 9781501753763.

=== Journals ===
- Chalyan, Valery; Meishvili, Natela (2003). "Study of Social Structure in Free-ranging Hamadryas Baboons". Anthropologie. 41 (2). Moravské zemské muzeum: 25–30. doi:10.2307/26292623. JSTOR 26292623.
- Field, Henry; Prostov, Eugene (1937). "Archaeology in the Soviet Union". American Anthropologist. 39 (3). Wiley-Blackwell: 457–490. doi:10.2307/662299. JSTOR 662299.

=== News ===
- "Georgia marks 32 years since Battle of Gumista". First Channel. 16 March 2025. Archived from the original on 14 November 2026.
- "Georgia Shoots Down a Russian Plane". The New York Times. 20 March 1993. Archived from the original on 26 May 2015.
- "Soviet resort erupts in civil strife". The Herald. 18 July 1989. p. 2 – via Newspapers.com.

=== Web ===
- "Report of the Secretary-General on the Situation in Abkhazia, Georgia" (PDF). United Nations Security Council. 26 June 2006. Archived (PDF) from the original on 14 November 2026.
