= Emblem of Abkhazia =

Abkhazia is a region in the Caucasus that is under the effective control of the partially recognised self-declared Republic of Abkhazia. The de jure majority internationally recognized Autonomous Republic of Abkhazia claims to be its legitimate government.

== Republic of Abkhazia ==
Coat of arms of the Republic of Abkhazia
- Armiger: Republic of Abkhazia
- Adopted: 1992
- Shield: Per pale Argent and Vert, a horseman between three mullets of eight points

The coat of arms of the Republic of Abkhazia was adopted by the Supreme Soviet of Abkhazia on 23 July 1992, after it unilaterally declared its secession from Georgia.

The emblem of separatist Republic of Abkhazia is a shield divided vertically into white and green. On this are placed devices outlined in gold:

- At the base eight-pointed star, in the upper part of both the white and the green field are set two eight-pointed stars.
- At the centre of the shield is a horseman, flying on the fabulous steed called Arash, and shooting an arrow towards the stars. This scene is from the heroic epic Narts.

Green symbolizes youth and life, while white symbolizes spirituality. The stars represent the sun, as well as the union of the East and West.

== Autonomous Republic of Abkhazia ==
Logo of the Government of the Autonomous Republic of Abkhazia
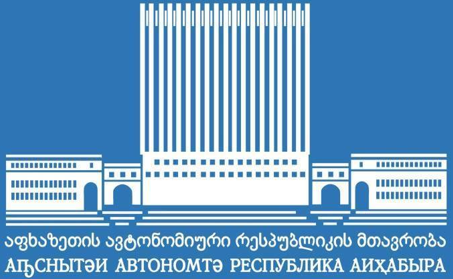
- Armiger: Government of the Autonomous Republic of Abkhazia

The Government of the Autonomous Republic of Abkhazia has adopted an logo which carries the name of the autonomous republic in Georgian and Abkhaz and depicts the House of the Government in Sukhumi.

A coat of arms has been proposed for the Government of the Autonomous Republic of Abkhazia by the State Council of Heraldry. These arms are quartered and depict an image of St George in the first quarter, the seven green and white stripes from the Abkhazia flag in the second and third quarters and the arms of the Shervashidze family in the fourth.

Logo of the Government of the Autonomous Republic of Abkhazia to 2012

Proposed coat of arms of the Autonomous Republic of Abkhazia

== Historical coat of arms ==
Coat of arms of the Principality of Abkhazia

Emblem of the Socialist Soviet Republic of Abkhazia (1928–1931)

Emblem of Abkhaz Autonomous Soviet Socialist Republic (1978–1992)

== See also ==
- Flag of Abkhazia
- Emblem of the Abkhaz Autonomous Soviet Socialist Republic
