= Ministry of Defence of Abkhazia =

- Abkhaz: Аԥсны Атәлахьчара Аминистрра, Russian: Министерство Обороны Республики Абхазия
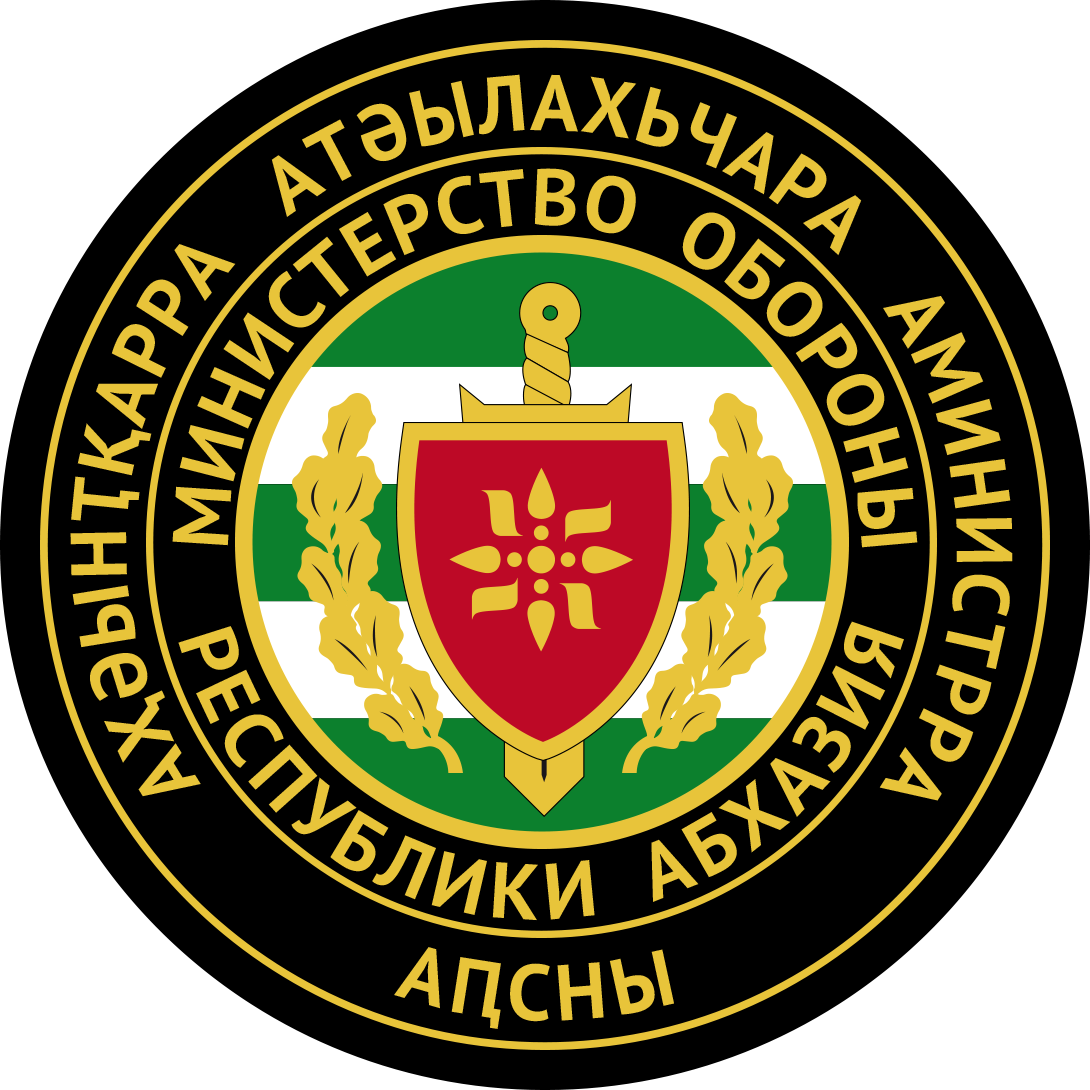
- Ministry Crest

Military agency overview
- Formed: 12 October 1992; 33 years ago
- Headquarters: Sukhumi
- Minister responsible: Colonel General Beslan Tsvizhba, Minister of Defence
- Website: https://mdapsny.org/

The Ministry of Defence of Abkhazia (Abkhaz: Аԥсны Атәлахьчара Аминистрра, Russian: Министерство Обороны Республики Абхазия) is an agency of the partially recognised Government of the Republic of Abkhazia. It is the executive body in implementing defence policies of the Abkhazian Armed Forces. It's acts as a bridge between the government and the military. The agency is headed by an official known as the Minister for Defence. The Minister of Defence is the executive minister responsible for the management of the armed forces. The current Minister of Defence is Colonel General Beslan Tsvizhba.

The Ministry of Defence was officially created on 12 October 1992 alongside the General Staff. They were created after the start of the war with Georgia.

== MoD structure ==
=== Institutions ===
During the war, an institute for working personnel was created in the structure of the Ministry of Defence, which was then transformed into an institute of commissioners.

==== Military Band Service ====
The Military Band Service of the Ministry of Defence is the military band of the republic. It was formed in 1993, with its first conductor having been Anatoly Hagba. At its formation, it had a personnel problem which was fixed upon Kishmaria's appointment as minister. Today, there are 16 musicians and two vocalists in the band, which mostly performs at military parades, oaths, and state funerals. Lieutenant General Valery Khalilov, the former Senior Director of Music of the Military Band Service of the Armed Forces of Russia, often donated instruments to the band. In 2010, at the invitation of the Ministry of Culture and the conductor of the State Chamber Orchestra, Armenian-born Abkhaz conductor (and Hagba's son-in-law) David Terzyan assumed the post of chief conductor of the military band service. Terzyan represented Abkhazia at the Spasskaya Tower Military Music Festival and Tattoo.

== Awards ==
The ministry has the authority to give 4 military awards:

- Medal "For impeccable service"
- Medal "For the maintenance of peace in Abkhazia"
- Military Valor Medal
- Medal "For the liberation of Kodor"

== See also ==
- Ministry of Defence (Transnistria)
- Ministry of Defence (South Ossetia)
- Ministry of Defence (Russia)
