= Abkhazian Armed Forces =

Military of Abkhazia

- Абџьарирқәу Амҷқәа Аԥсны Аҳәынҭқарра; Вооружённые силы Республики Абхазия
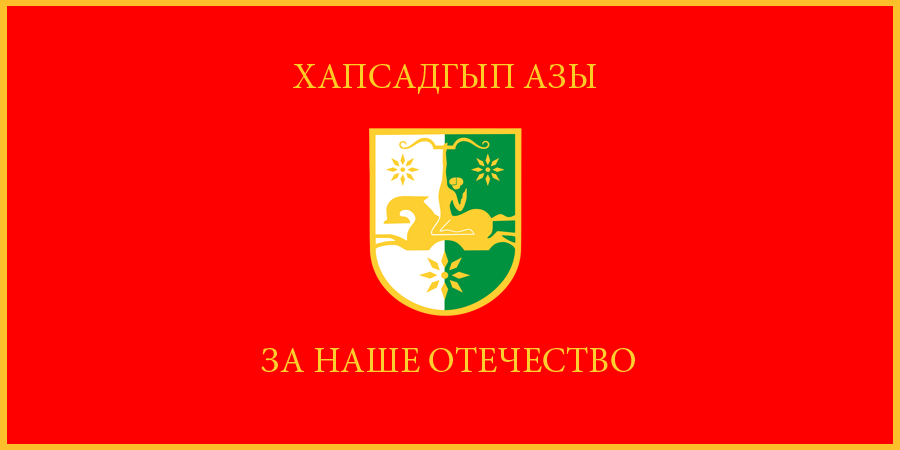
- Banner
- Motto: For Our Fatherland; Хапсадгып Азы; За Наше Отечество
- Founded: 12 October 1992; 34 years ago
- Service branches: Abkhazian Army; Abkhazian Navy; Abkhazian Air Force

Leadership
- Commander-in-chief: Badra Gunba
- Prime Minister: Vladimir Delba
- Minister of Defence: Colonel General Beslan Tsvizhba
- Chief of Staff: Colonel General Vladimir Savchenko

Personnel
- Active personnel: 2,500–3,000
- Reserve personnel: 5,000–10,000

Industry
- Foreign suppliers: Russia; USSR (Former)

Related articles
- History: Military history of Abkhazia; Abkhazian War; Six-Day War of Abkhazia; Kodori Crisis; Russo-Georgian War
- Ranks: Military ranks of Abkhazia

The Abkhazian Armed Forces (Abkhaz: Абџьарирқәу Амҷқәа Аԥсны; Russian: Вооружённые силы Абхазии) are the military forces of Abkhazia. (Note: The political status of Abkhazia is disputed. Having unilaterally declared independence from Georgia in 1992, Abkhazia is formally recognised as an independent state by 4 UN member states (three other states previously recognised it but then withdrew their recognition), while the remainder of the international community recognizes it as de jure Georgian territory. Georgia continues to claim the area as its own territory, designating it as Russian-occupied territory.) The forces were officially created on 12 October 1992, after the outbreak of the 1992–1993 war with Georgia. The basis of the armed forces was formed by the ethnic Abkhaz National Guard. The Abkhaz military is primarily a ground force but includes small sea and air units. According to the authorities of the Republic of Abkhazia, the Abkhazian Land Forces are organised along the Swiss model – in time of peace they have personnel of 3,000 to 5,000 and in case of war further 40–50,000 reservists are called out. Georgia regards the Abkhaz armed forces as "unlawful military formations" and accuses Russia of supplying and training the Abkhaz troops.

== History ==
=== Abkhaz National Guard (1991–1992) ===
Prior to the establishment of the formal armed forces, the Abkhaz National Guard (Abkhazian: Аҧсны Аҳәынҭқарра Амилаҭтә гвардиа) served as the primary Abkhaz paramilitary formation. It was established in early 1992 under the authority of the Abkhazian Supreme Soviet, led by Vladislav Ardzinba. Created during a period of escalating ethnic tension within the Republic of Georgia, the Guard was modeled after the Soviet Army's 8th Regiment but functioned primarily as a volunteer militia. Its formation served as a direct response to the growing influence of Georgian paramilitary groups, specifically the Mkhedrioni and the National Guard of Georgia.

The Guard played a pivotal role in the events leading to the outbreak of conflict. In June 1992, the unit stormed the Abkhazian Ministry of Internal Affairs in Sukhumi, forcibly removing the ethnic Georgian Minister Givi Lominadze and replacing him with Alexander Ankvab. When Georgian government forces entered Abkhazia on 14 August 1992—officially to secure the regional railway—they were engaged by the Guard at a checkpoint in Okhurei, marking the start of full-scale hostilities.

=== 1992–1993 War and formalization ===
Following the initial Georgian offensive, the National Guard retreated to the separatist stronghold of Gudauta. From this base, the Guard reorganized with the assistance of the Confederation of Mountain Peoples of the Caucasus and other foreign volunteer detachments. On 11 October 1992, following the recapture of Gagra, Vladislav Ardzinba issued a decree officially transforming the National Guard into the foundation of the modern Abkhazian Armed Forces. This transition marked the formalization of the separatist military structure, integrating the original Guard units with various local self-defense groups to sustain the war effort against Georgian forces.

The Ministry of Defence and the General Staff of the Abkhazian armed forces were officially created on 12 October 1992, after the outbreak of the 1992–1993 war with Georgia. The basis of the armed forces was formed by the ethnic Abkhaz National Guard created earlier in 1992 prior to the outbreak of the war. It also takes its roots from the Separate Regiment of Internal Troops, which was disbanded in 1991. During the war, the Abkhazian forces – with the critical support from the Confederation of Mountain Peoples of the Caucasus, Cossack volunteers and Russian regular military units stationed in or near Abkhazia – succeeded in defeating the Georgian troops; Georgians, Armenians, Greeks, Russians and Abkhaz were killed. Roughly 200,000 to 250,000 Georgian civilians became Internally displaced persons (IDPs). Most of the military's weapons come from the Russian airborne division base in Gudauta, while others were captured from Georgian forces.

Georgia regards the Abkhaz armed forces as "unlawful military formations" and accuses Russia of supplying and training the Abkhaz troops, partly in exchange for Abkhaz land or hotels. The Abkhaz deny this, saying they bought what they have on the free market except for five sea cutters received from Russia and speedboats from the Abkhaz diaspora in Greece. In March 2005, then Abkhazian defence minister Sultan Sosnaliev said that the senior and middle-ranking officers in the Abkhaz army are regularly sent to Russia for 2–3 month training courses within the framework of the Russia's "Vystrel" (Shot) program.

Sosnaliev himself is a Russian officer from the Kabardino-Balkaria Republic (Russian Federation) and held the same post during the Abkhazian war, when Chechen field commander and militant Shamil Basayev was his deputy. Similarly, former chief of staff, Major General Anatoly Zaitsev had previously served as deputy commander of the Transbaikal Military District (now part of the Siberian Military District) in Russia. Another top official, Deputy Defence Minister Aleksandr Pavlushko is a Russian colonel and the former chief of staff of the Russian peacekeeping forces in Abkhazia. Georgia also regularly accuses Abkhazia of forcibly recruiting Georgian returnees from the Gali district into the armed forces.

The Abkhaz military is primarily a ground force but includes small sea and air units. In 2006, an "anti-terrorist centre" of some 200 personnel was created under the de facto ministry of interior. The de facto minister of finance estimated, in 2006, that 35 per cent of Abkhazia's budget was spent on the military and police.

=== Modern history ===
On 8 May 2007, Minister of Defence and Vice Premier Sultan Sosnaliyev resigned. He was succeeded as Defence Minister (but not as Vice Premier) by First Deputy Defence Minister Mirab Kishmaria, in an acting fashion from 10 May and permanently from 26 July onwards.

On 14 April 2010, five Deputy Ministers of Defence were retired, including Chief of the Armed Forces Anatoli Zaitsev. Aslan Ankvab was appointed acting First Deputy Minister of Defence and Chief of Staff. On 21 May 2010, Beslan Tsvishba was also appointed First Deputy Minister of Defence. On 29 March 2011, Vladimir Vasilchenko succeeded Aslan Ankvab to become the new, permanent, Chief of Staff and First Deputy Minister of Defence.

On 24 November 2014, the governments of Abkhazia and Russia signed a treaty of cooperation that creates a joint force of troops from the two countries. In September 2019, Russian President Vladimir Putin approved a proposal to finance the modernization of the Abkhazian Armed Forces.

On 18 May 2015, retired Russian army general Anatoly Khrulyov was appointed Chief of the General Staff by President Raul Khajimba.

== Organisation ==
=== Military leadership ===
From	#	President	#	Minister of Defence	#	Chief of the General Staff
1992	No president		1	Vladimir Arshba	1	Sultan Sosnaliyev
1993	No president		1	Vladimir Arshba	1	Sultan Sosnaliyev
1993	No president		2	Sultan Sosnaliyev	2	Sergei Dbar
1994	No president		2	Sultan Sosnaliyev	2	Sergei Dbar
1994	1	Vladislav Ardzinba	2	Sultan Sosnaliyev	2	Sergei Dbar
1995	1	Vladislav Ardzinba	2	Sultan Sosnaliyev	2	Sergei Dbar
1996	1	Vladislav Ardzinba	2	Sultan Sosnaliyev	2	Sergei Dbar
1996	1	Vladislav Ardzinba	3	Vladimir Mikanba	3	Vladimir Arshba
1997	1	Vladislav Ardzinba	3	Vladimir Mikanba	3	Vladimir Arshba
1998	1	Vladislav Ardzinba	3	Vladimir Mikanba	3	Vladimir Arshba
1999	1	Vladislav Ardzinba	3	Vladimir Mikanba	3	Vladimir Arshba
2000	1	Vladislav Ardzinba	3	Vladimir Mikanba	3	Vladimir Arshba
2001	1	Vladislav Ardzinba	3	Vladimir Mikanba	3	Vladimir Arshba
2002	1	Vladislav Ardzinba	3	Vladimir Mikanba	3	Vladimir Arshba
2002	1	Vladislav Ardzinba	4	Raul Khajimba	3	Vladimir Arshba
2003	1	Vladislav Ardzinba	4	Raul Khajimba	3	Vladimir Arshba
2003	1	Vladislav Ardzinba	5	Viacheslav Eshba	3	Vladimir Arshba
2004	1	Vladislav Ardzinba	5	Viacheslav Eshba	3	Vladimir Arshba
2005	1	Vladislav Ardzinba	5	Viacheslav Eshba	3	Vladimir Arshba
2005	2	Sergei Bagapsh	6	Sultan Sosnaliyev	4	Anatoli Zaitsev
2006	2	Sergei Bagapsh	6	Sultan Sosnaliyev	4	Anatoli Zaitsev
2007	2	Sergei Bagapsh	6	Sultan Sosnaliyev	4	Anatoli Zaitsev
2007	2	Sergei Bagapsh	7	Mirab Kishmaria	4	Anatoli Zaitsev
2008	2	Sergei Bagapsh	7	Mirab Kishmaria	4	Anatoli Zaitsev
2009	2	Sergei Bagapsh	7	Mirab Kishmaria	4	Anatoli Zaitsev
2010	2	Sergei Bagapsh	7	Mirab Kishmaria	4	Anatoli Zaitsev
2010	2	Sergei Bagapsh	7	Mirab Kishmaria	Aslan Ankvab	
2011	2	Sergei Bagapsh	7	Mirab Kishmaria	Aslan Ankvab	
2011	3	Alexander Ankvab	7	Mirab Kishmaria	5	Vladimir Vasilchenko
2012	3	Alexander Ankvab	7	Mirab Kishmaria	5	Vladimir Vasilchenko
2013	3	Alexander Ankvab	7	Mirab Kishmaria	5	Vladimir Vasilchenko
2014	3	Alexander Ankvab	7	Mirab Kishmaria	5	Vladimir Vasilchenko
2014	Valeri Bganba		7	Mirab Kishmaria	5	Vladimir Vasilchenko
2014	4	Raul Khajimba	7	Mirab Kishmaria	5	Vladimir Vasilchenko
2015	4	Raul Khajimba	7	Mirab Kishmaria	5	Vladimir Vasilchenko
2015	4	Raul Khajimba	7	Mirab Kishmaria	6	Anatoly Khrulyov

=== Structure ===
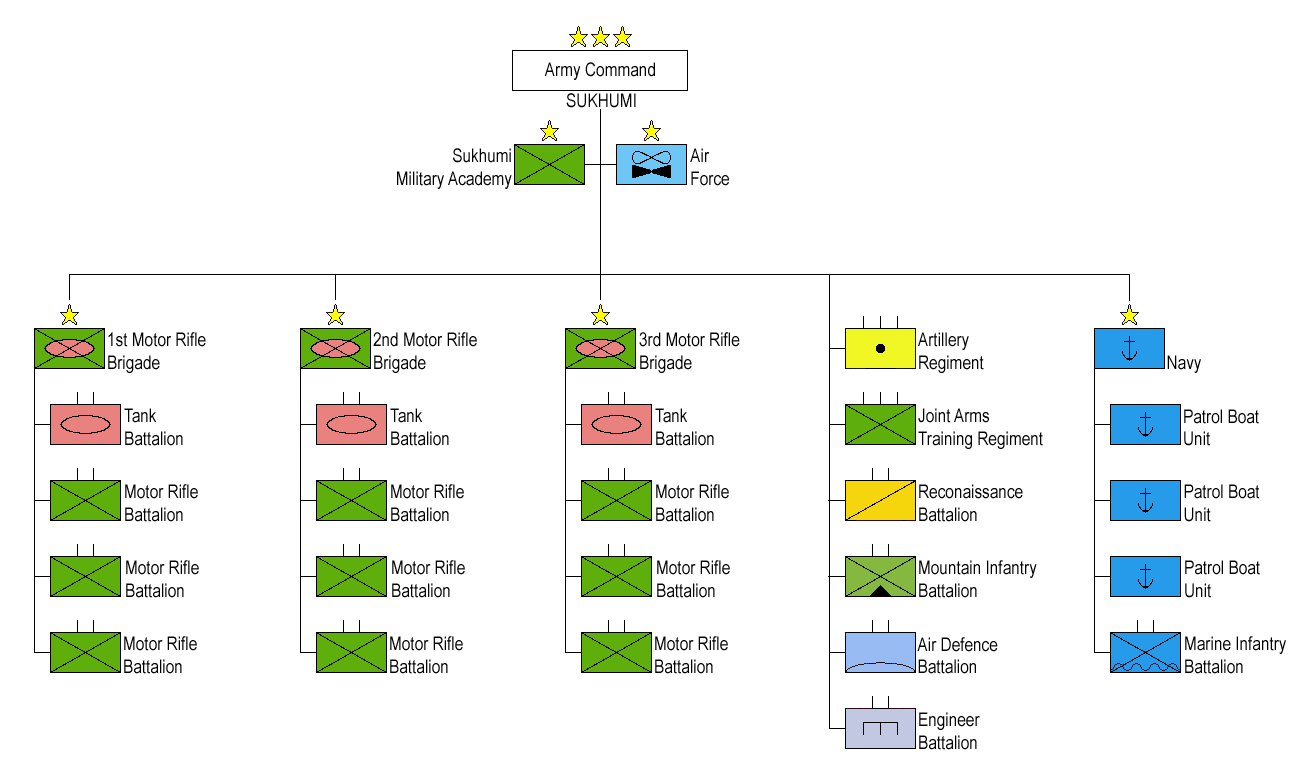
Structure of the Abkhazian Armed Forces.

It is also divided into the following Military Districts:

- Central Military District (Sukhumi)
- Eastern Military District (Ochamchire)
- Western Military District (Pitsunda)

== Branches ==
=== Army ===
According to the authorities of the Republic of Abkhazia, the Abkhazian Land Forces are organised along the Swiss model – in time of peace they have personnel of 3,000 to 5,000 and in case of war further 40-50,000 reservists are called out. They are authorised to keep registered weapons at home.

It is divided into the following formations:

- General Staff Headquarters
- 1st Motor Rifle Brigade
  - 3-4 Motorized rifle battalions
  - Tank battalion
- 2nd Motor Rifle Brigade
  - 3-4 Motorized rifle battalions
  - Tank battalion
- 3rd Motor Rifle Brigade
  - 3-4 Motorized rifle battalions
  - Tank battalion
- Artillery Regiment
- Engineering Battalion
- Mountain Infantry Battalion
- Intelligence Battalion
- Independent Special Purpose Detachment

=== Navy ===
The Abkhazian Navy consists of three divisions that are based in Sukhumi, Ochamchire and Pitsunda. Four ships Project 1204 Shmel class PBR, 657 (ex-AK-599), 658 (ex-AK-582), and 328 (ex-AK-248) were transferred from the Russian Navy in the late 1990s. An additional ship ex-AK-527 was also transferred and cannibalized for spares. The three Abkhaz ships did not take part in the 2008 South Ossetia conflict, but their state was unclear. As of 2005 the first two of them had one PSKA Project 1400M Grif ("Zhuk") class PC speed-boats each. The navy also includes several civil vessels that were equipped with guns and unguided rocket artillery systems. NOVOSTI (Russian News & Information Agency) gives the following naval figures: over 20 motor boats armed with machine-guns and small-caliber cannons.

=== Air Force ===
The Abkhazian Air Force uses Russian and Soviet-built aircraft. It is a small force, which numbers only 7 aircraft, 3-4 helicopters, and 250 personnel.

== Education ==
- Sukhumi Higher Combined-Arms Command School
- The Combined-Arms Academy of the Ministry of Defense at Abkhaz State University. The main mission of the Combined Arms Academy is to train officers with higher military education. The Combined-Arms Academy was the first military educational institution to which the training of officer personnel in operational-tactical command was given entrusted.

== Equipment ==
The exact numbers and types of equipment remain unverifiable as no thorough international monitoring has ever been carried out in Abkhazia. NOVOSTI (Russian News & Information Agency) gives the following army figures: 10,000-strong Abkhazian Self Defense Force wielding 59 tanks, including 9 T-72s, 92 artillery pieces and mortars, including several dozen with a 122–152-mm caliber and 36 armored vehicles of different types, also has numerous anti-tank weapons ranging from RPG-7 rocket launchers to Konkurs-M anti-tank guided missiles (ATGMs). Given the status of Abkhazia and recent armed conflict with Georgia a variety of equipment has been utilized by formations of the Abkhazian military, including inherited Soviet equipment, donated Russian weapons, impressed civilian gear, and items captured from the Georgians.

=== Armored combat vehicles ===
Model	Image	Origin	Type	Number	Notes
Tanks
T-72		Soviet Union; Russia	Main battle tank	9	
T-55		Soviet Union	Main battle tank	50	
Infantry fighting vehicles
BMP-2		Soviet Union; Russia	Infantry fighting vehicle	25	
Armored cars
BRDM-2		Soviet Union	Amphibious armoured scout car	11	
Anti Air vehicles
9K37 Buk		Soviet Union; Russia	Surface-to-air missile system		
ZSU-23-4 Shilka		Soviet Union; Russia	Self-propelled anti-aircraft weapon	5	

=== Artillery ===
Model	Image	Origin	Type	Number	Notes
Artillery
BM-21 "Grad"		Soviet Union	Multiple rocket launcher	14	
122 mm 2A18		Soviet Union	Field artillery		90 units in service (Combined)
85 mm D-44		Soviet Union	Field artillery		90 units in service (Combined)
120 mm mortar		Soviet Union	Mortar		90 units in service (Combined)
82 mm mortar		Soviet Union	Mortar		90 units in service (Combined)
KSM-65 100 mm		Soviet Union	Coastal artillery		In 2008 some were reactivated from storage; exact types and number are unspecified.

=== Small arms ===
Model	Image	Origin	Type	Number	Notes
RPG-18		Soviet Union	Rocket launcher		
RPG-7		Soviet Union	Rocket launcher		
PK		Soviet Union	Machine gun		
RPK		Soviet Union	Light machine gun		
AS Val		Soviet Union	Suppressed assault rifle		
AK-74		Soviet Union	Assault rifle		
AKM		Soviet Union	Assault rifle		Reserves only.
AK-47		Soviet Union	Assault rifle		Reserves only.
Dragunov		Soviet Union	Sniper rifle		
Makarov		Soviet Union	Pistol		
F-1		Soviet Union	Hand grenade		
RGD-5		Soviet Union	Hand grenade		

== Russian troops ==
Russia maintains a 3,500-strong force in Abkhazia with its headquarters in Gudauta, a former Soviet military base on the Black Sea coast north of the capital, Sukhumi, under a September 2009 agreement on military cooperation. The Gudauta base hosts Russia's 131st Separate Motorized Rifle Brigade, equipped with at least 41 T-90 main battle tanks and 130 BTR-80 APCs. The brigade is said to the subordinate to the Russian 49th Army headquartered in Stavropol. As of 2021, the Bombora air base (7th Military Base) also hosts air defence assets which reportedly include S-400 and S-300 surface-to-air missile units.

== Symbols ==
- The Day of the Armed Forces is celebrated on 11 October.
- The cities of Tkvarcheli and Gudauta are considered to be "hero cities" as they were awarded the title of Hero of Abkhazia as a result of their military glory.
- On 12 July 2018, the Law "On the Banner of Victory in the Patriotic War of the People of Abkhazia 1992–1993" was adopted by deputies of the Parliament, being symbol of the military victory of the Abkhazian Armed Forces. Not to be confused with the Soviet Victory Banner, which was raised by the Red Army soldiers on the Reichstag building on 1 May 1945, the Abkhazian Victory Banner was hoisted on the state border along the Ingur River on 20 September 1993. It is currently maintained by the Ministry of Defense of Abkhazia. The location, order and use of the banner is determined by the President of the nation.
- The Bank of Abkhazia, which responsible for the Abkhazian apsar has issued two coins honoring the Abkhaz military in the patriotic war.

== Bibliography ==
- Давид Петросян (David Petrosyan). Проблемы непризнанных государств на постсоветском пространстве: Южный Кавказ (Problems of the unrecognised states in the former USSR: South Caucasus) (in Russian)
- Милитаризм по-кавказски (Caucasian-style militarism), Независимая Газета (Nezavisimaya Gazeta), 13.10.2001 (in Russian)
- Абхазский де-факто министр рассказывает о приоритетах, "Civil.Ge", Tbilisi 2005-01-04 (in Russian)
- Багапш приказал топить грузинские суда, Независимая Газета, 25.07.2005 (in Russian)
