= Theatre Square, Tskhinvali =

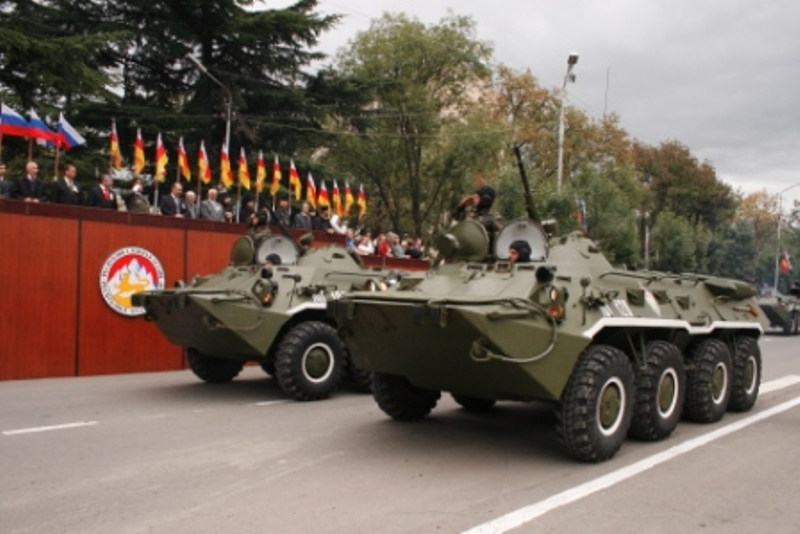
- South Ossetian military tanks in the square in 2009.

- Location within South Ossetia Location within Shida Kartli Location within Georgia
- Area: square
- Location: Tskhinvali, Georgia de jure South Ossetia de facto
- Coordinates: 42°13′32″N 43°58′12″E

Theatre Square (Russian: Театральна площадь) is a public area in Tskhinvali, the capital of the partially recognized Republic of South Ossetia.

== History ==
New Year's Day celebrations held on the square between 31 December and 1 January. All Independence Day and Victory Day Parades occur on the Square. Back when Tskhinvali was known as called Staliniri, it bore the name "The Central Square" and had a monument to the Soviet leader Joseph Stalin. After coming to power in the 50s, Premier Nikita Khrushchev's De-Stalinization program forced the dismantlement of the monument in the middle of the night. After 2005, the theatre on the square was completely destroyed, the residents and the city leadership came to a consensus on its restoration.
