= Minister for Defence of Abkhazia =

Minister for Defence of The Republic of Abkhazia
- Incumbent; Beslan Tsvizhba since 5 May 2026
- Appointer: President of Abkhazia
- Term length: No fixed term
- Inaugural holder: Vladimir Arshba
- Formation: 11 October 1992
- Website: md.apsny.land

The office of Minister for Defence (Abkhaz: атәыла хьчара аминистр, Georgian: თავდაცვის მინისტრი, Russian: министр обороны) has been one of the most important in the breakaway Republic of Abkhazia due to the ongoing conflict with Georgia. The person in the position heads the Ministry of Defence of Abkhazia, which controls the Abkhazian Armed Forces.

== History ==
The position was created 11 October 1992, shortly after the outbreak of the 1992-1993 war with Georgia. The first Minister for Defence was Vladimir Arshba, but due to his injuries, for most of the time his functions were carried out by Deputy Minister for Defence and Chief of the General Staff Sultan Sosnaliev, who eventually also formally succeeded Arshba on 25 April 2003. Sosnaliev oversaw Abkhazia's successful expulsion of Georgian forces and remained Defence Minister until on 1 July 1996 he resigned to return to his native Kabardia.

Sosnaliev's successor was Vladimir Mikanba, who held the position during the May 1998 war in the Gali district and the October 2001 incursion of Chechen fighters down the Kodori valley.

Mikanba was succeeded by Raul Khajimba, who would go on to become Prime Minister, and who is the current Vice President of Abkhazia. 22 April 2003, when Khajimba became Prime Minister, Viacheslav Eshba became Minister for Defence. On 8 November 2004, during the height of the crisis following the 2004 Presidential election, a source within the government claimed that Eshba had been replaced by Mukhamed Kilba, the deputy chief of Khajimba's presidential campaign, but this was denied by Prime Minister Nodar Khashba.

On 25 February 2005, newly elected President Sergei Bagapsh called on Sultan Sosnaliev to become Defence Minister once more. Sosnaliev agreed and held the office until shortly after his 65th birthday on 8 May 2007 he resigned for personal reasons.

On 26 June 2007 then Deputy Defence Minister Mirab Kishmaria was appointed Sosnaliev's successor. During the August 2008 war in South Ossetia, he oversaw the Abkhazian conquest of so-called Upper Abkhazia, the only part of Abkhazia that had remained under Georgian control since the 1992-1993 war. Kishmaria remained Minister of Defence until 2020 and served for more than 12 years, the longest officeholder since the creation of the position in 1992.

== List of people to hold the office ==
No.	Portrait	Name (born–died)	Term			Ref.
No.	Portrait	Name (born–died)	Took office	Left office	Duration	Ref.
1	Vladimir Arshba	Vladimir Arshba (1959–2018)	11 October 1992	25 April 1993	196 days	
2	Sultan Sosnaliyev	Sultan Sosnaliyev (1942–2008)	25 April 1993	1 July 1996	3 years, 67 days	
3	Vladimir Mikanba	Vladimir Mikanba (1931–2010)	1 July 1996	9 December 2002	6 years, 161 days	
4	Raul Khajimba	Raul Khajimba (born 1958)	9 December 2002	22 April 2003	134 days	
5	Viacheslav Eshba	Viacheslav Eshba (1949–2023)	22 April 2003	25 February 2005	1 year, 309 days	
(2)	Sultan Sosnaliyev	Sultan Sosnaliyev (1942–2008)	25 February 2005	8 May 2007	2 years, 72 days	
6	Mirab Kishmaria	Mirab Kishmaria (born 1961)	26 June 2007	1 June 2020	12 years, 341 days	
7	Vladimir Anua	Vladimir Anua (born 1957)	1 June 2020	5 May 2026	5 years, 338 days	
8	Beslan Tsvizhba	Beslan Tsvizhba (born 1970)	5 May 2026	Incumbent	125 days	

== See also ==
- Abkhazian Armed Forces
- President of Abkhazia
- Vice President of Abkhazia
- Prime Minister of Abkhazia
- Minister for Foreign Affairs of Abkhazia
