= Flag of Abkhazia =

Abkhazia is a region in the Caucasus that is under the effective control of the partially recognised self-declared Republic of Abkhazia. The de jure majority internationally recognized Autonomous Republic of Abkhazia claims to be its legitimate government.

== Republic of Abkhazia ==
Republic of Abkhazia
- Proportion: 1:2
- Adopted: 23 July 1992
- Design: Seven horizontal stripes alternating green and white; in the canton, a white open hand below a semicircle of seven five-pointed stars on a red field.
- Designed by: Valeri Gamgia
- Use: Presidential standard
- Design: The national flag defaced with the national emblem in the center.
- Designed by: Valeri Gamgia
- Use: Naval ensign
- Design: A white flag with a blue stripe on the bottom. The canton contains a white hand with seven stars in a semicircle above the hand.

The flag of the Republic of Abkhazia (Note: Abkhaz: Аԥсны Аҳәынҭқарра Абираҟ) (Note: The political status of Abkhazia is disputed. Having unilaterally declared independence from Georgia in 1992, Abkhazia is formally recognised as an independent state by 4 UN member states (three other states previously recognised it but then withdrew their recognition), while the remainder of the international community recognizes it as de jure Georgian territory. Georgia continues to claim the area as its own territory, designating it as Russian-occupied territory.) was created in 1991 by Valeri Gamgia. It was officially adopted on 23 July 1992 – the same day as the Declaration of Independence of Abkhazia.

The design of the red canton is based on the banner of the medieval Kingdom of Abkhazia. The open right hand means Hello to friends! Stop to Enemies!. The seven stars in the canton have since been reinterpreted to correspond to the seven historical regions of the country: Sadzen, Bzyp, Gumaa, Abzhywa, Samurzaqan, Dal-Tsabal and Pskhuy-Aibga.

Seven is a number sacred to the Abkhaz and the green and white stripes represent the tolerance that allows Christianity and Islam to coexist.

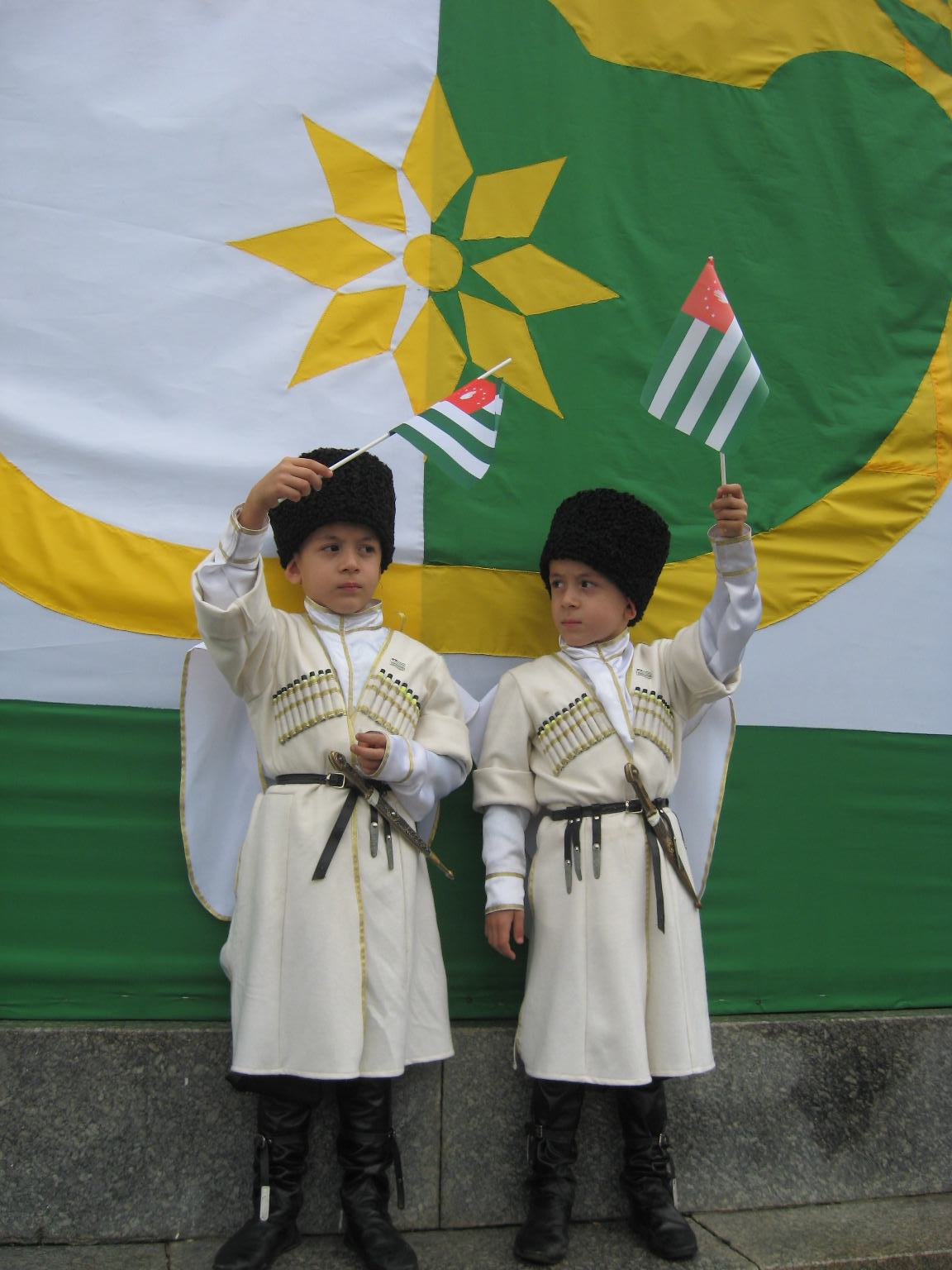
Abkhazian children waving miniature flags of Abkhazia

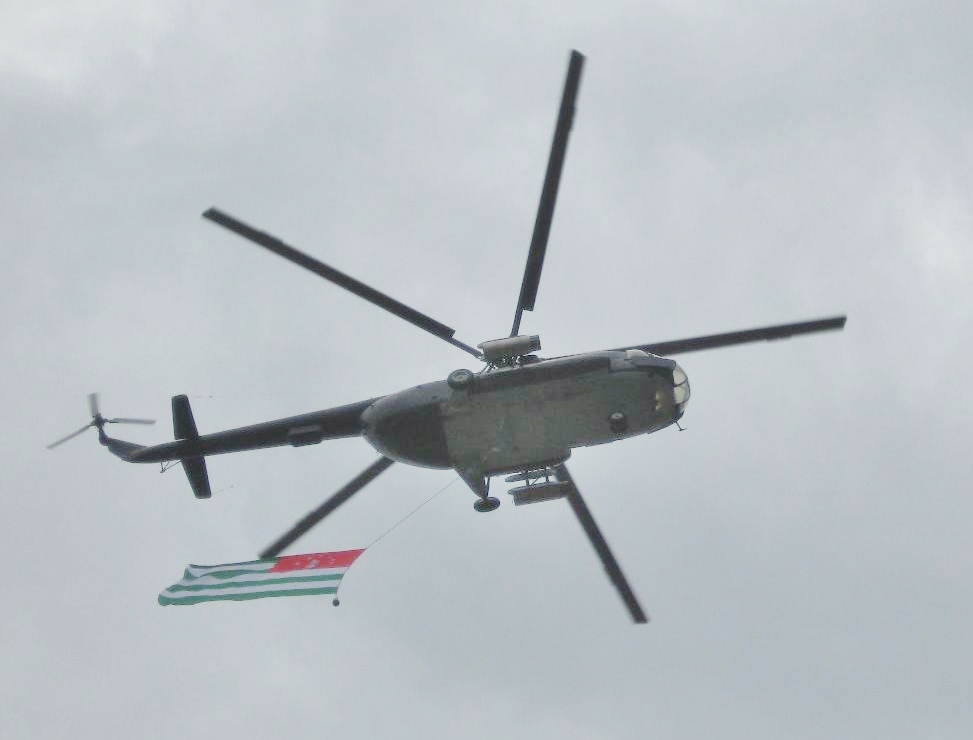
Helicopter towing the Abkhazian flag

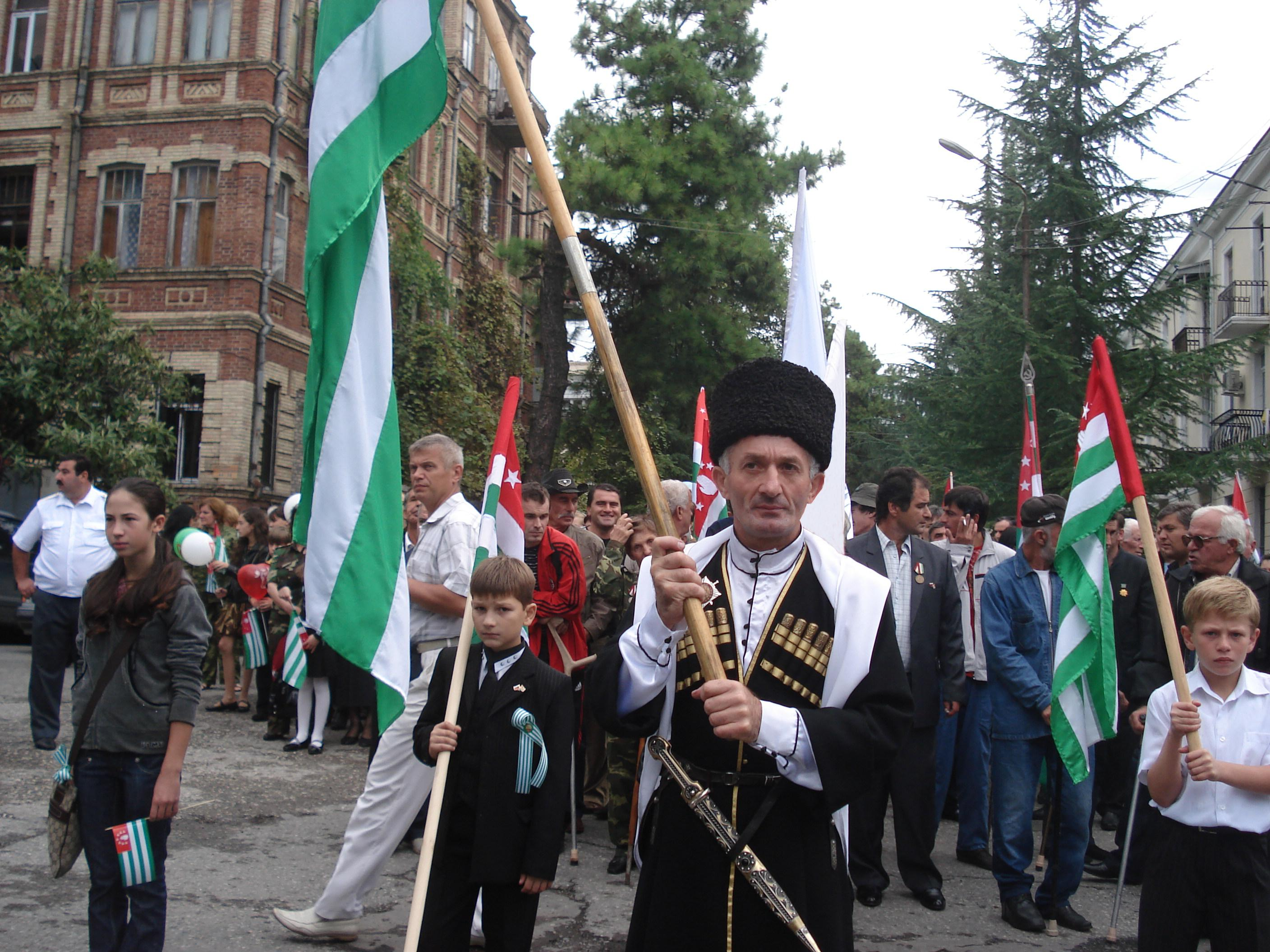
Parade exhibiting Abkhazian flags

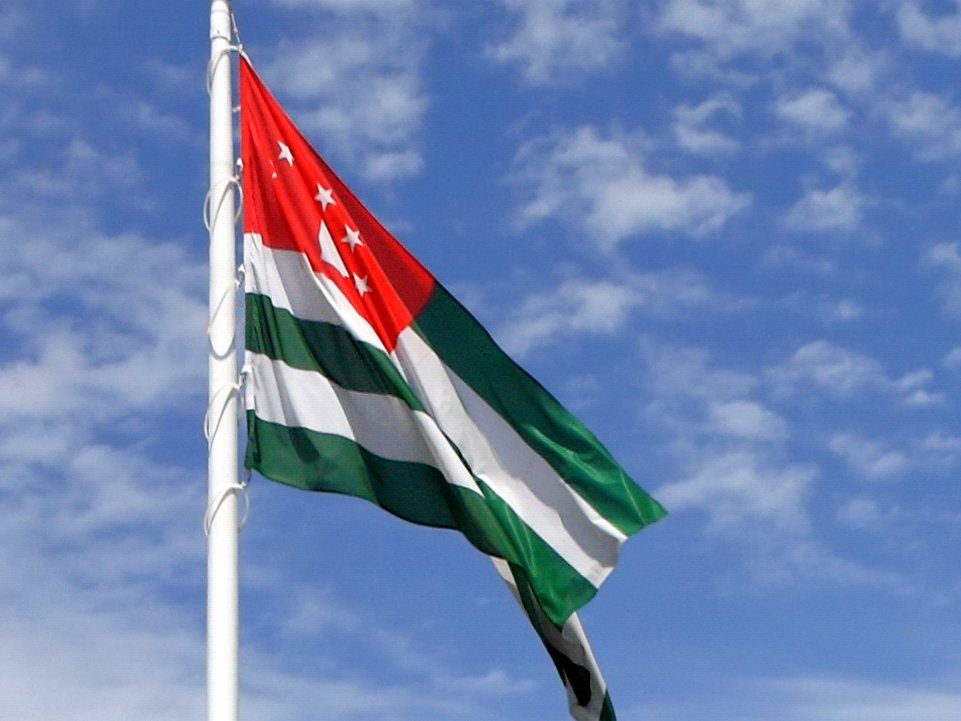
Flag of Abkhazia on flagpole

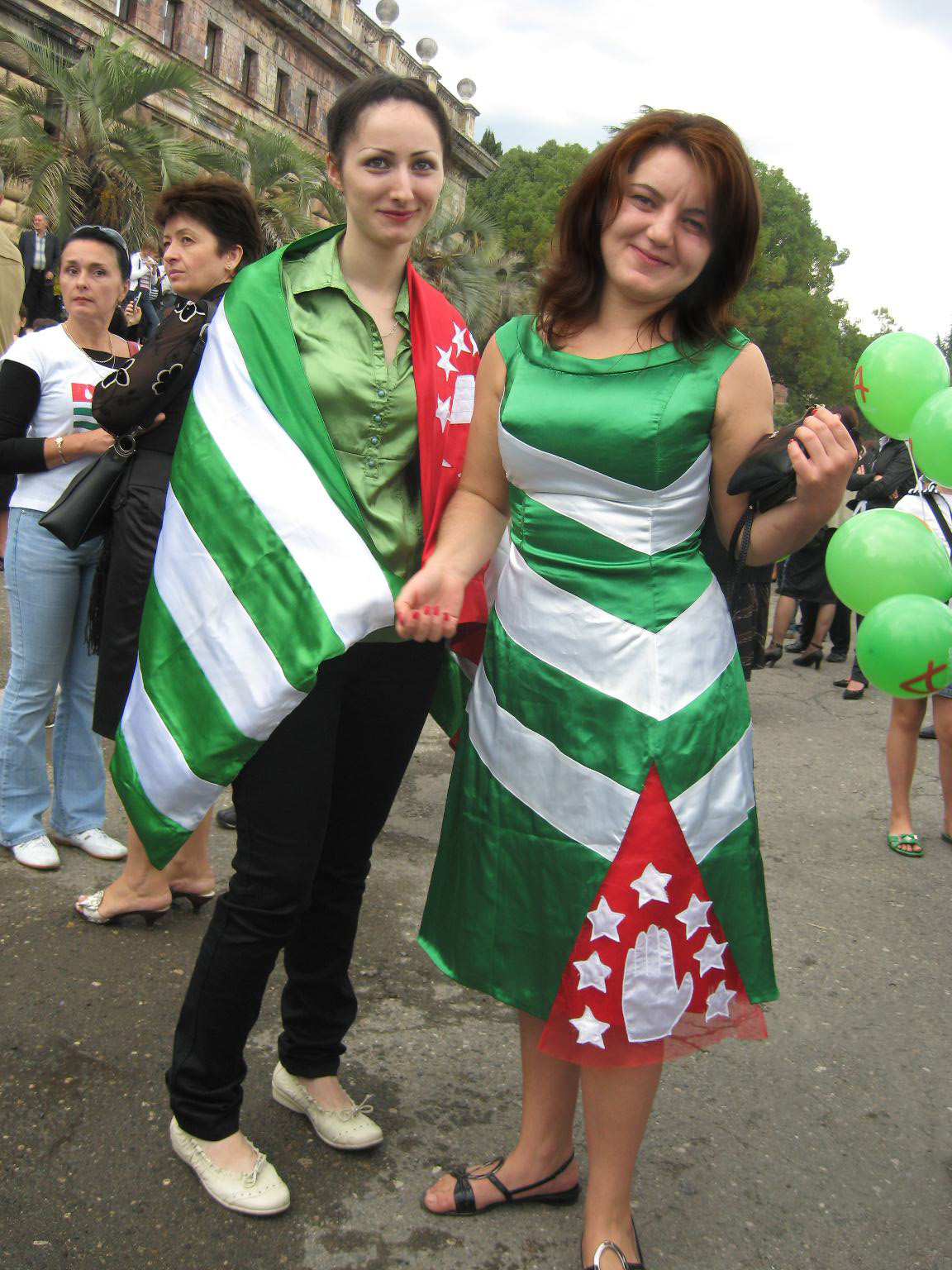
Ladies in flag clothes

== Autonomous Republic of Abkhazia ==
As no official flag has been adopted for use by the Autonomous Republic of Abkhazia, the flag of Georgia is used by the Government of Autonomous Republic of Abkhazia.

A flag has been proposed by the Georgian State Council of Heraldry for the region that combines the flag of Georgia with green and white stripes of the Abkhazian flag.

Flag of Georgia

Proposed flag of the Autonomous Republic of Abkhazia

== Historical flags ==
=== Socialist Soviet Republic of Abkhazia ===
The flag of the SSR Abkhazia was adopted in 1925 when the SSR Abkhazia ratified its constitution. It was used until 1931, when the SSR Abkhazia was transformed into the Abkhaz ASSR with a different flag.

Flag of the Socialist Soviet Republic Abkhazia (1925–31)

=== Abkhaz Autonomous Soviet Socialist Republic ===
The flag of the Abkhaz ASSR was introduced in 1978 and used until the collapse of the Soviet Union in 1991. The previous flag used between 1931 and 1978 was identical to the flag of the Georgian SSR, and in 1978 the name of the Abkhaz ASSR was added written in the Abkhaz language and script.

Flag of the Abkhaz ASSR introduced in 1978

== Flag on stamps ==
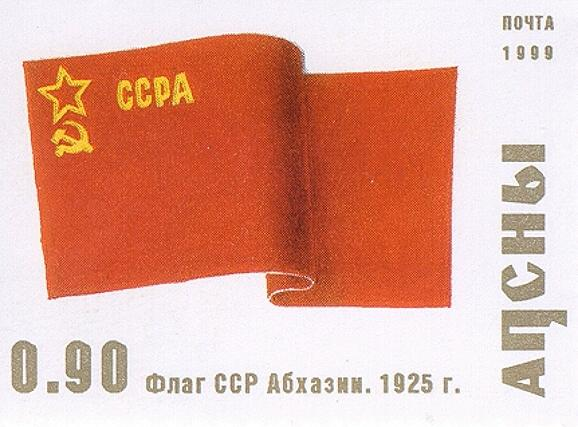
The flag of the SSR of Abkhazia on an Abkhazian stamp. The flag on the stamp does not match with the description on the constitution.

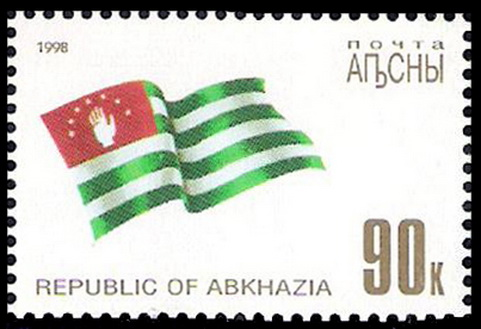
The flag of the Republic of Abkhazia on an Abkhazian stamp.

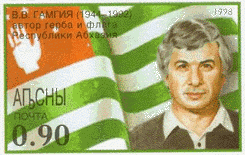
Another Abkhazian flag on a stamp

== See also ==
- Emblem of Abkhazia
- Coat of arms of the Socialist Soviet Republic of Abkhazia
- Flag of the Abkhaz Autonomous Soviet Socialist Republic
- Flag of Ulster
