= Vladimir Mikanba =

Abkhhazian politician (1931–2010)

Vladimir Tach-ipa Mikanba Владимир Тач-иҧа Мқанба

3rd Minister of Defence of Abkhazia
- In office 11 July 1996 – 4 January 2002
- Preceded by: Sultan Sosnaliyev
- Succeeded by: Raul Khadjimba

1st Vice Premier of Abkhazia
- In office 1 July 1992 – 1 July 1999

Personal details
- Born: 23 September 1931 New Athos, Gudauta District Abkhazian ASSR, Georgian SSR, USSR
- Died: 22 February 2010 (aged 78)

Vladimir Tach-ipa Mikanba (Abkhaz: Владимир Тач-иҧа Мқанба, Georgian: ვლადიმერ მიქანბას, Russian: Владимир Тачевич Миканба; 23 September 1931 – 22 February 2010) was the Minister of Defence of the unrecognised Republic of Abkhazia from 1996 until 2002.

== Early life and career ==
Vladimir Mikanba was born 23 September 1931 in New Athos in the Gudauta District of what was then the Abkhazian Autonomous Soviet Socialist Republic. In 1960 he graduated from the Moscow road institute. From 1960 to 1975 Mikanba held various positions within the Sukhumi taxi organisation. From 1975 until 1985, he was Chairman of the Executive Committee of the City Soviet of Sukhumi, a position equivalent to that of Mayor.

In March 1985 Vladimir Mikanba was appointed Minister for Local Industry of the Abkhazian ASSR a position he held until July 1989. From 1989 until 1992 Mikanba was Deputy Chairman of the Council of Ministers.

== Vice Premier and Minister of Defence ==
From 1992 until 1999 Vladimir Mikanba was Vice Premier of Abkhazia, which became de facto independent during this time. In 1996 he also became Minister of Defence, succeeding Sultan Sosnaliyev, a position he held until 2002 when he was succeeded by later Prime Minister and Vice President Raul Khadjimba.

== Death ==
Mikanba died on 22 February 2010 at the age of 79.

== Sources ==
- Лакоба, Станислав (2004). "Абхазия после двух империй XIX—XXI вв." // 21st Century COE Program Slavic Eurasian Studies — No. 5. Sapporo: Slavic Research Center, Hokudai University.

Political offices
Preceded by Sultan Sosnaliyev	Minister of Defence of Abkhazia; 1996–2002	Succeeded by Raul Khadjimba
