= Mukhamed Kilba =

Abkhazian politician

Mukhamed Setbievich Kilba is the current Secretary of the Security Council of Abkhazia. Kilba was appointed on 28 October 2014 by newly elected President Raul Khajimba.
