= Bedia =

Bedia may refer to:

== Given name ==
- Bedia Akartürk (born 1941), Turkish folk music singer
- Bedia Güleryüz (1903–1991), Turkish painter
- Bedia Muvahhit (1897–1994), Turkish stage and movie actress
- Dilara Bedia Kızılsu (born 1965), Turkish sport shooter

== Surname ==
- Chris Bedia (born 1996), Ivorian-French professional footballer
- José Bedia Valdés (born 1959), Cuban painter
- Melha Bedia (born 1990), French actress and comedian
- Ramzy Bedia (born 1972), French actor

== Places ==
- Bedia, Spain, a city in the province of Biscay, Spain
- Bedia (village), a village in the Gali Municipality of Georgia

== Other uses ==
- Bedia (caste), a community of Bihar, northern India
- Bedia (Muslim caste), a community of Bihar, northern India
- Bedia Cathedral, a medieval Georgian Orthodox cathedral

== See also ==
- Bediha, a Turkish feminine given name
- Bediya, a village in Gir Somnath district, Gujarat, India
