= Lashkendari Church =

Ruined medieval church on Mount Lashkendar in Abkhazia

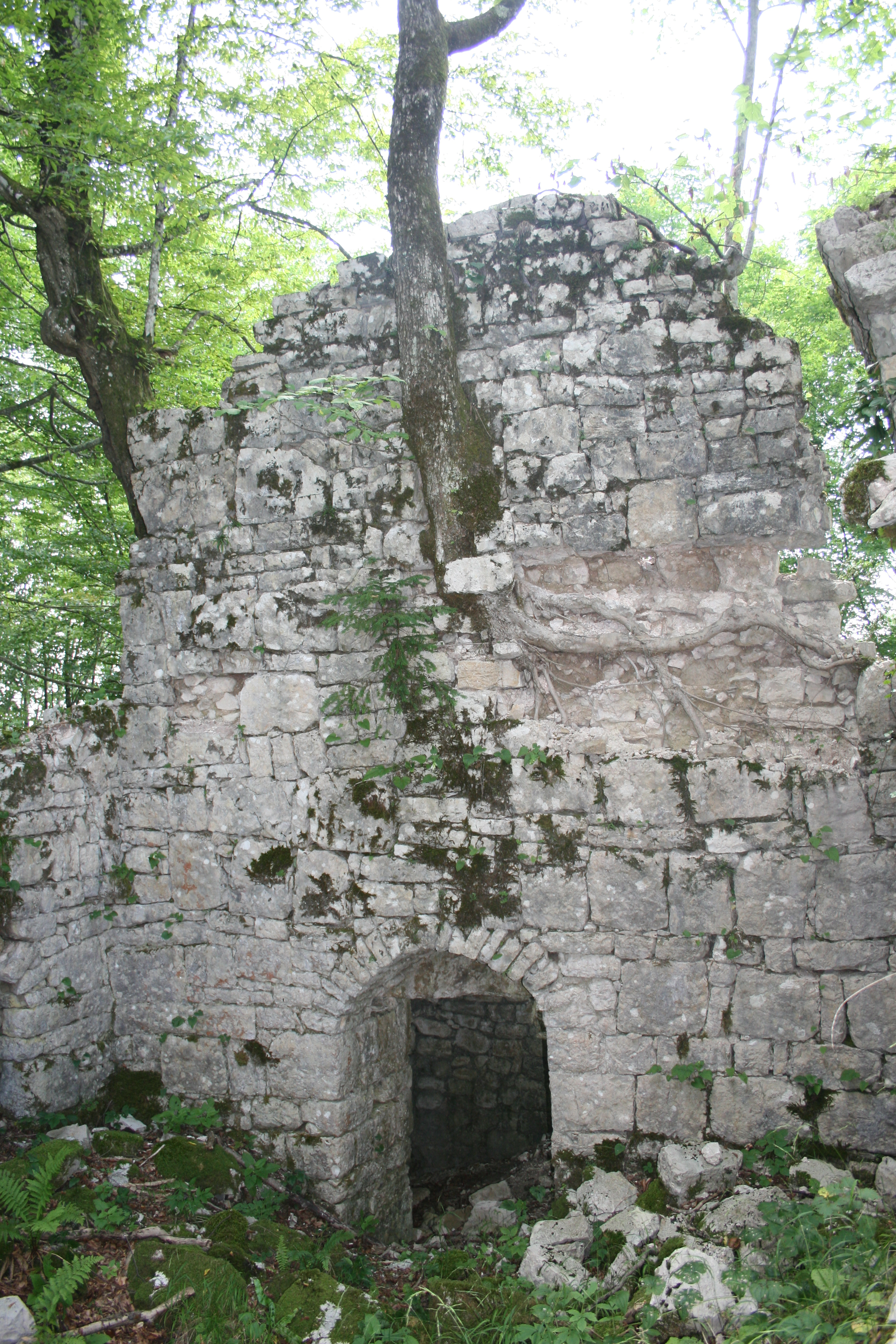
- Lashkendari Church

Location
- Location: Abkhazia / Georgia
- Interactive map of Lashkendari Church
- Coordinates: 42.816944°N 41.743013°E

Architecture
- Type: Church

Lashkendari Church (Georgian: ლაშქენდარის ეკლესია, romanized: lashkendaris ek'lesia) is a ruined medieval church on Mount Lashkendar in Abkhazia, a breakaway region of Georgia. It is located near the small village of Khuhkuni in the Ochamchire Municipality/Tkvarcheli District, some 5–6 km south-east of the town of Tkvarcheli. The site is revered as a holy shrine by both Abkhaz and Georgians.

== Description ==
The church is a complex building, consisting of a main domed edifice to which a smaller church with a semi-circular apse is attached on the north. The whole complex is surrounded by a 100-meter-long protective fence. The two churches communicate through a doorway. The complex can be entered through four doors. The central entrance, located on the south side of the fence, is surmounted with an arch with a Christian cross curved in relief. Above the western door is a bas-relief with two stylized animals facing each other. This piece of arts has its closest parallel to the depiction of two deer on a tympanum above the northern portal of the 7th-century Ateni Sioni Church in eastern Georgia. The remaining two doors are on the northern side of the wall.

The dome of the main church has collapsed. The gate of the church — apparently a later addition — is well-preserved. The church is surrounded by an artificial platform with burials. Archaeological excavations revealed several items, such as: bronze lion figures, candlesticks, different types of ritual items, bearing similarities with other examples of medieval Georgian Christian art. The complex has been variously dated to the period from the 7th to the 11th centuries.
