= Bedia Gulani =

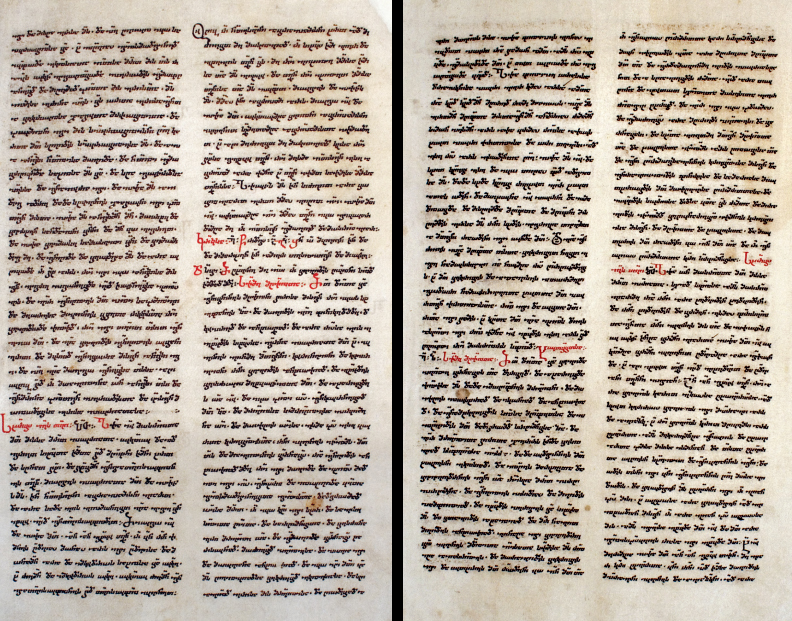
Bedia Gulani manuscript

The Bedia gulani (Georgian: ბედიის გულანი) is a Georgian manuscript of the 17th–18th centuries copied in the nuskhuri script at the Bedia Cathedral. Gulani—literally, "storing," "preserving" or "gathering"—is a Georgian name of liturgical collection or anthology.

The Bedia gulani consists of the Four Gospels, Acts of the Apostles, the Epistles of the Apostles, the twelve hymns, psalms, and other liturgical texts. It was commissioned by Germane Chkhetidze, Metropolitan Bishop of Bedia, from the calligrapher Gabriel Lomsanidze from Shavsheti. Two other persons were also involved in copying the manuscript: Ambrosi Kargareteli and Svimon Evprateli. The manuscript consists of 960 folios, 45.5 x 33.5 cm in size. The text is executed in the medieval nuskhuri script, still in use by the Georgian church establishments at that time, in two columns, in beautiful handwriting. The ink is black; titles are marked in cinnabar. The manuscript is currently preserved at the Georgian National Center of Manuscripts in Tbilisi.
