= Public holidays in Abkhazia =

The following is a list of public holidays in Abkhazia. The working days are marked in cursive.

Date	English name	Abkhaz name	Russian name	Remarks
1–2 January	New Year's Day		Новый год	
7 January	Christmas Day		Рождество Христово	Celebration of the Birth of Jesus
14 January	Azhyrnykhua	Ажьырныҳәа	Ажьырныхуа	Celebration of the creation of the world
8 March	International Women's Day		Международный женский день	Celebration of women's rights and womanhood
1 May	Labour Day		День труда	
9 May	Victory Day		День Победы	On 9 May 1945, Nazi Germany was defeated and the Great Patriotic War came to an end in Europe
21 May	Day of remembrance of the Caucasian War and the forced evictions of the Mountain Peoples of the Caucasus		День памяти жертв Кавказской войны и насильственного выселения горских народов Кавказа	Circassian Day of Mourning
23 May	Day of the Holy Apostle Simon the Zealot		День Святого Апостола Симона Кананита	
23 July	Flag Day		День Государственного Флага Республики Абхазия	On 23 July 1992 the Flag of Abkhazia was officially adopted
26 August	Independence Recognition Day		День международного признания независимости Абхазии	On 26 August 2008 the independence of Abkhazia was recognised by Russia
28 August	Nankhua (Assumption of Mary)		Нанхуа (День Успения Пресвятой Богородицы)	
30 September	Independence Day		День независимости Республики Абхазия	On 30 September 1993 the 1992–1993 war with Georgia ended and Abkhazia gained de facto independence
11 October	Armed Forces Day		День Вооруженных Республики Абхазия	
26 November	Constitution Day		День Конституции Республики Абхазии	On 26 November 1994 the current Constitution of Abkhazia was adopted
14 December	Day of the children killed during the 1992-1993 war in Abkhazia		День памяти детей, погибших в Отечественной войне в Абхазии (1992—1993 гг.)	On 14 December 1992 a helicopter carrying evacuees from the Siege of Tkvarcheli was shot down, killing 25 children
varies	Easter			
Dhul Hijja 10	Eid al-Adha		Курбанныхуа	Commemoration of the willingness of Ibrahim to sacrifice his son Ismael in obedience to Allah
