= Independence Day (Abkhazia) =

State holiday in Abkhazia

Independence Day of Abkhazia
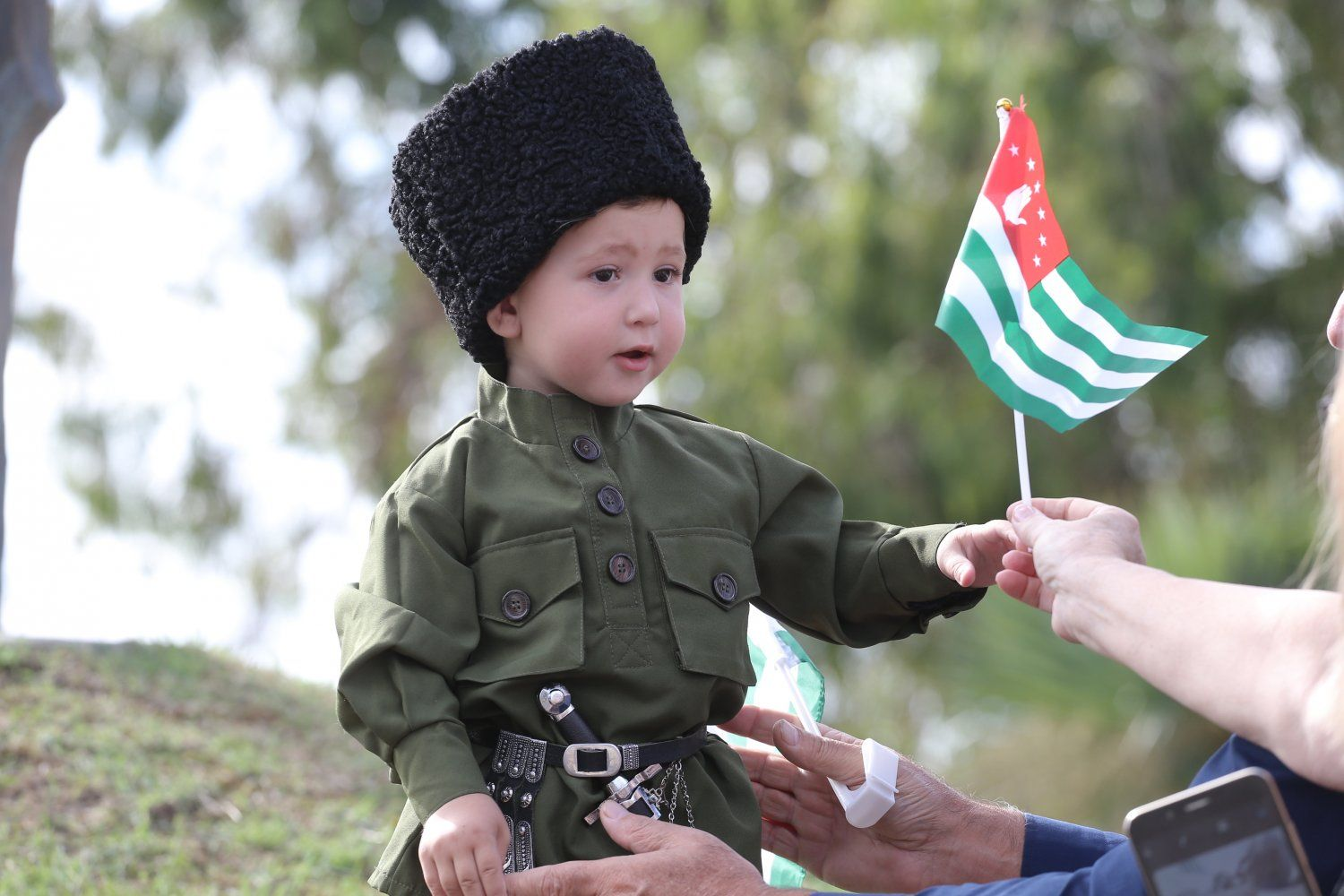
- An Abkhaz boy wearing traditional Abkhazian clothing during the independence day celebrations in 2017.
- Official name: Russian: День независимости Абхазии
- Observed by: Abkhazia; Abkhazian Diaspora (mostly in Russia and Georgia); Russia (Russian 7th Military Base)
- Liturgical color: Green, Red, White
- Celebrations: Military parade (Quinquennial); Concerts
- Observances: Fireworks in the capital
- Begins: 11:00 am (officially)
- Ends: 6:00 pm (officially)
- Date: September 30
- Related to: War in Abkhazia (1992–1993)

The Independence Day of Abkhazia (Russian: День независимости Абхазии) also known among Abkhazians as Liberation Day (Russian: День освобождения) or Victory Day (Russian: День победы) is the main state holiday in the partially recognized Republic of Abkhazia. It celebrates the end of the War in Abkhazia (1992–1993) and the declaration of independence. This date is celebrated on September 30.

== Background ==
September 30 was chosen as the Independence Day to commemorate the date on which the Georgian government troops and ethnic Georgians were driven out by the Abkhaz secessionist forces and their allies from much of Abkhazia, including the capital, Sukhumi, in a series of fierce battles during the war in Abkhazia in 1993. On August 14, 1992, troops of the State Council of Georgia led by Tengiz Kitovani entered in Abkhazia. The Museum of War Glory in central Sukhumi, which was opened in December 2014, has artifacts and memorabilia from the war.

== Celebrations ==
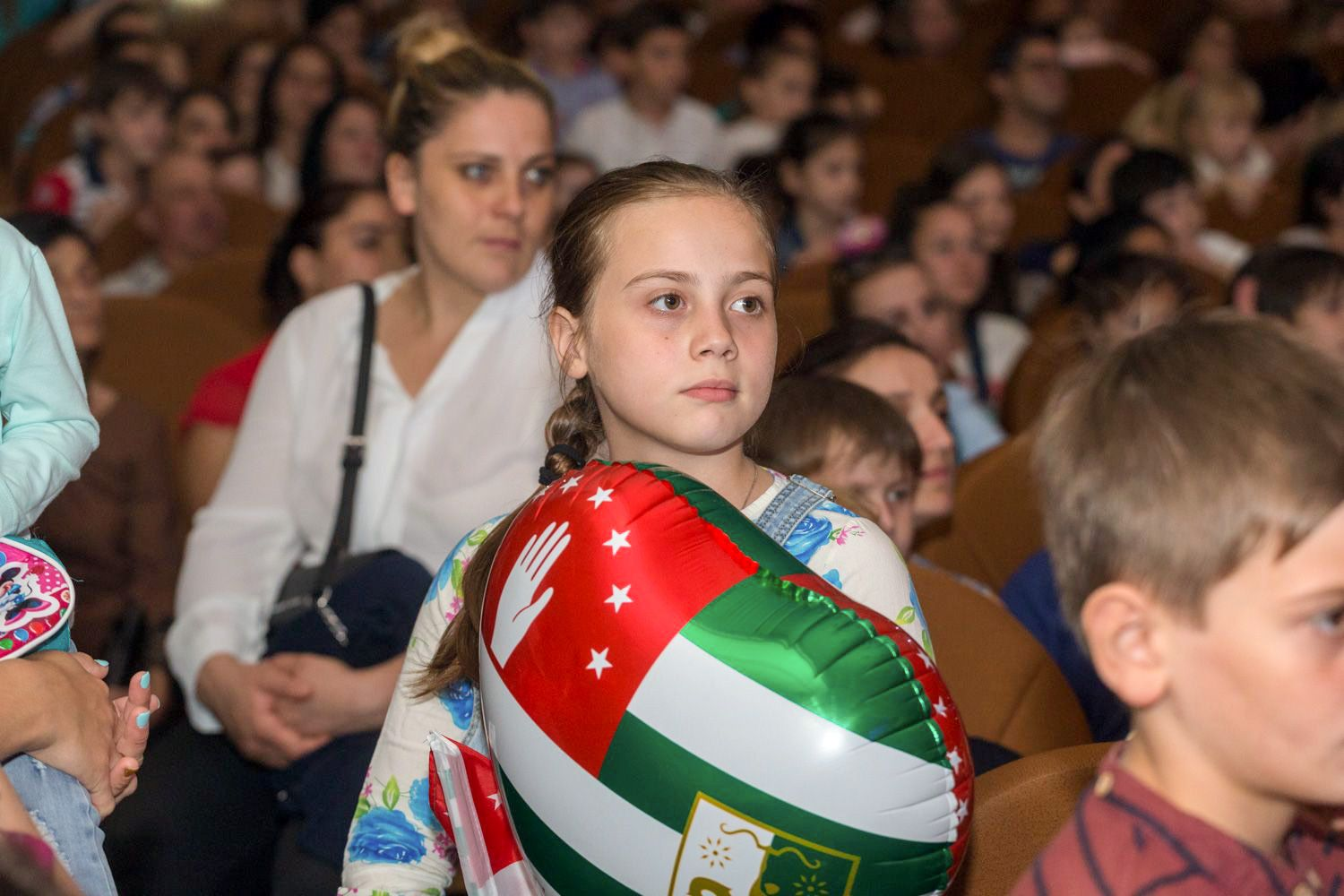
A girl holding a balloon during the celebrations in 2017.

Many citizens and veterans are awarded the title of Hero of Abkhazia on this day. The military parade on Freedom Square is usually the main event on jubilee years (every 5 years). 2018 celebrated the 25th anniversary of the Victory in the Patriotic War, which included the parading of a captured T-55 tank with the call sign "01" on Freedom Square.

=== Russian celebrations ===
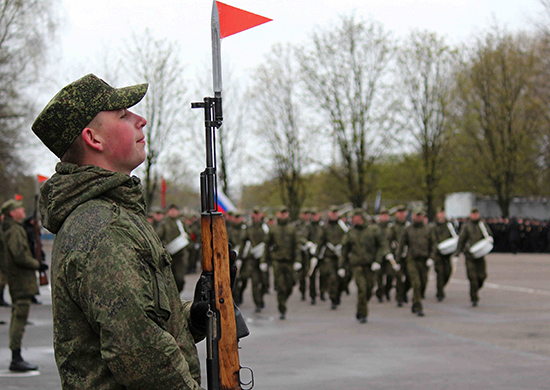
Celebrations at the 7th Military Base in 2017.

Members of the Russian Federation's 7th Military Base in Abkhazia celebrate Liberation Day with an annual military parade at the base as well as with a joint ceremony with the Abkhazian Armed Forces.

=== Official government programme ===
The official government program during the celebrations runs from 11:00 am to 6:00 pm.

- 11:00 - Laying of flowers at the Memorial Complex to the victims of the war.
- 12:00 - Military parade in the Park of Military Glory
- 13:00 - Laying of flowers at the Memorial the first President of Abkhazia Vladislav Ardzinba
- 14:00 - Laying of flowers at the grave of former President of Abkhazia Sergey Bagapsh
- 17:00 - Gala concert in the R. Gumba Philharmonic
- 18:00 - A theatrical performance events from the war.

=== Jubilee military parade ===
Every five years, a military parade in honor of the jubilee anniversary of the Victory and Independence of Abkhazia is held on Freedom Square in Sukhumi. It usually begins with the State Flag and the Victory Banner of Abkhazia being brought onto the Square. The parade commander then reports to the Minister of Defense of Abkhazia, who in turn inspects the troops and reports to the Commander-in-Chief. Annual participants include formations from the armed forces, militarized formations, guests contingents from the Armed Forces of Russia and the Ministry of Defense of South Ossetia, as well as the Cossacks of the Black Sea, Don and Kuban Cossacks.

== Gallery ==
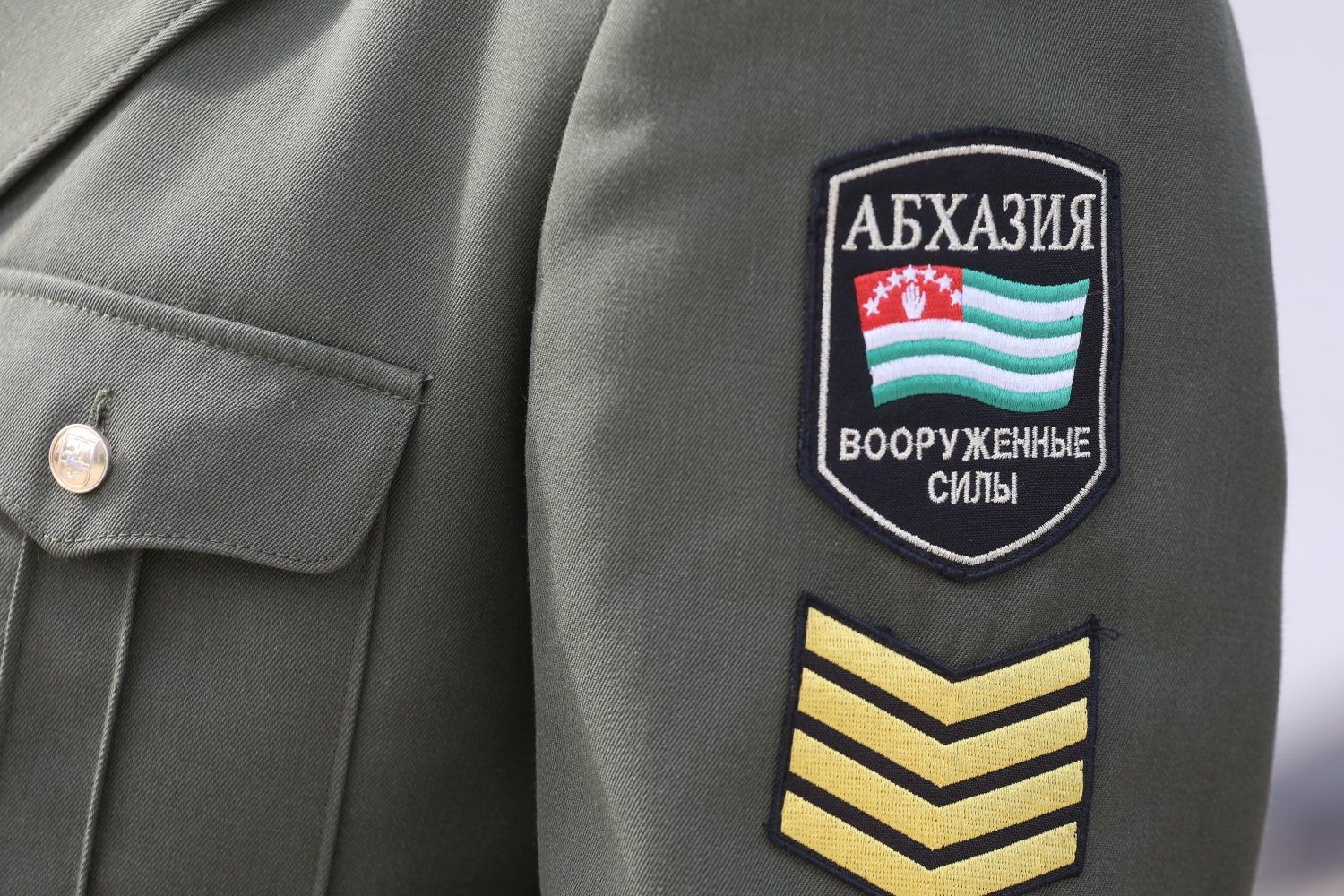

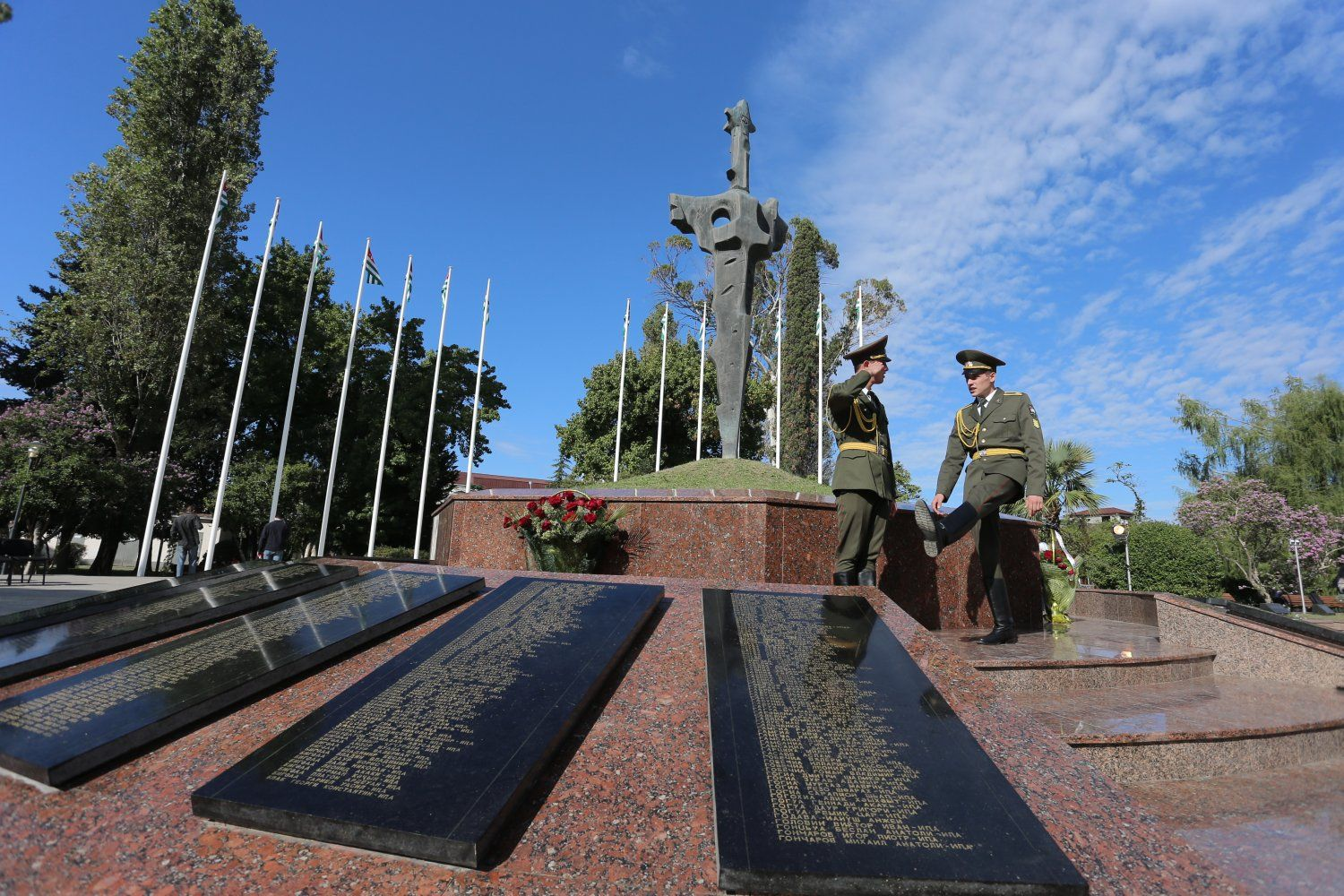

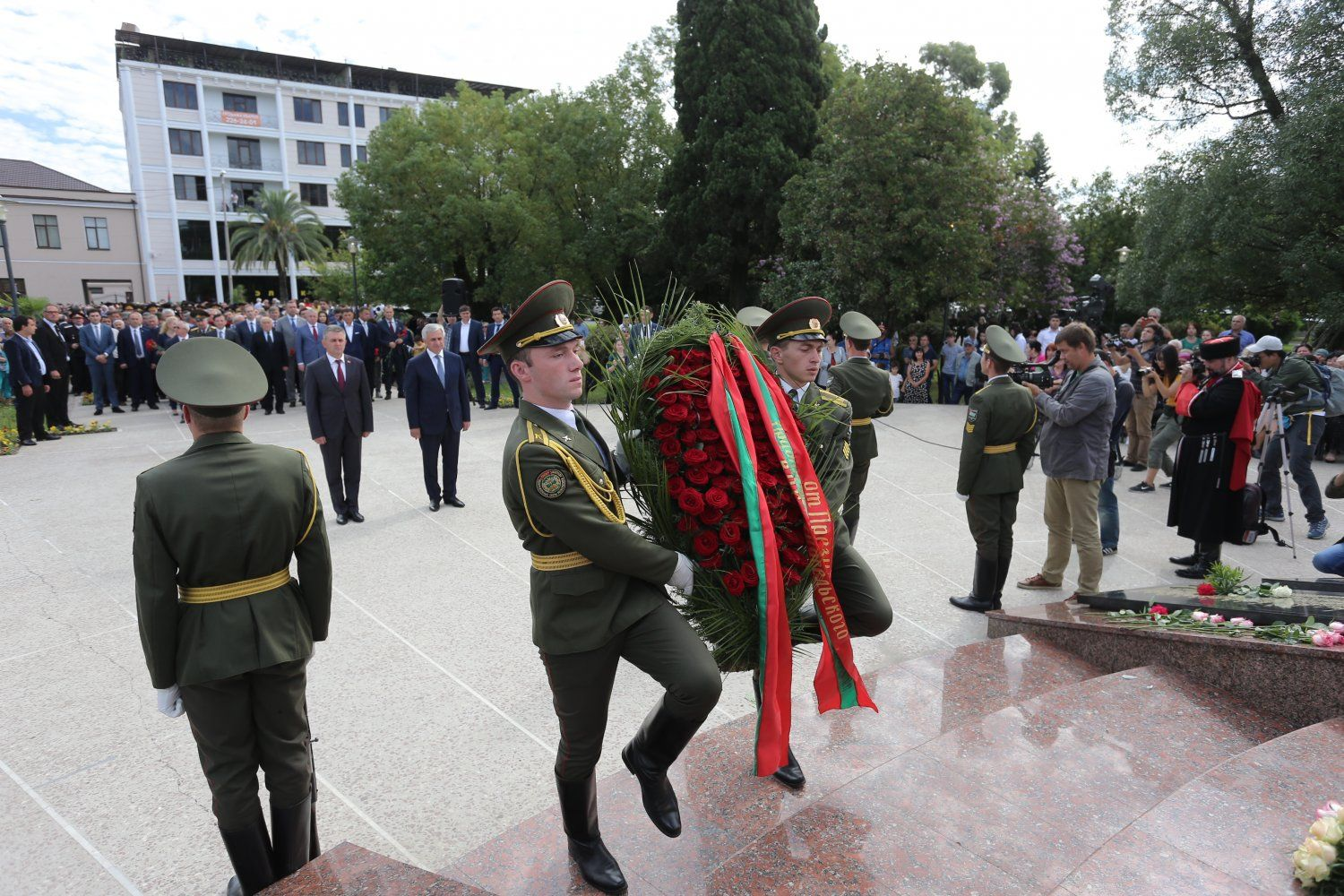

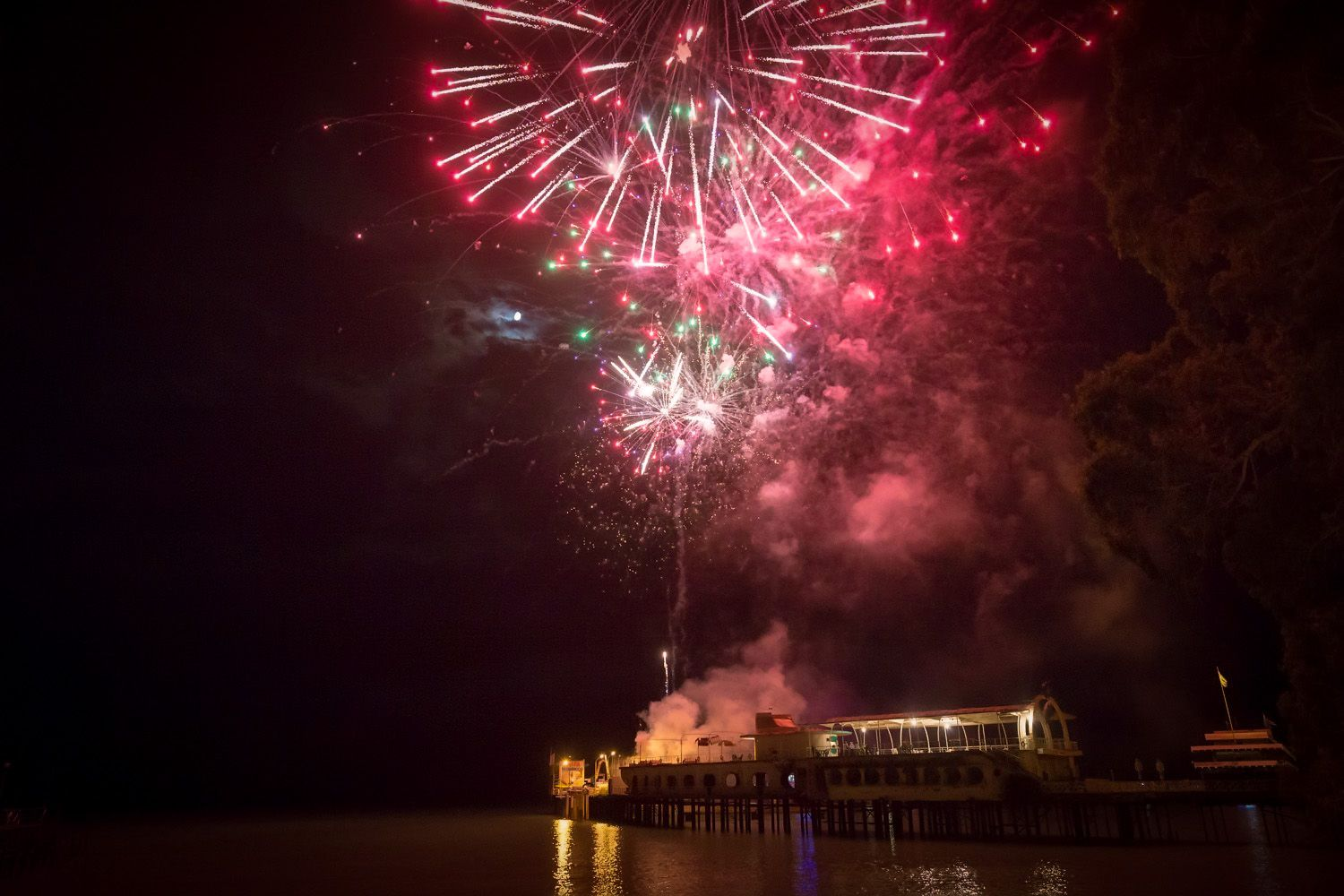

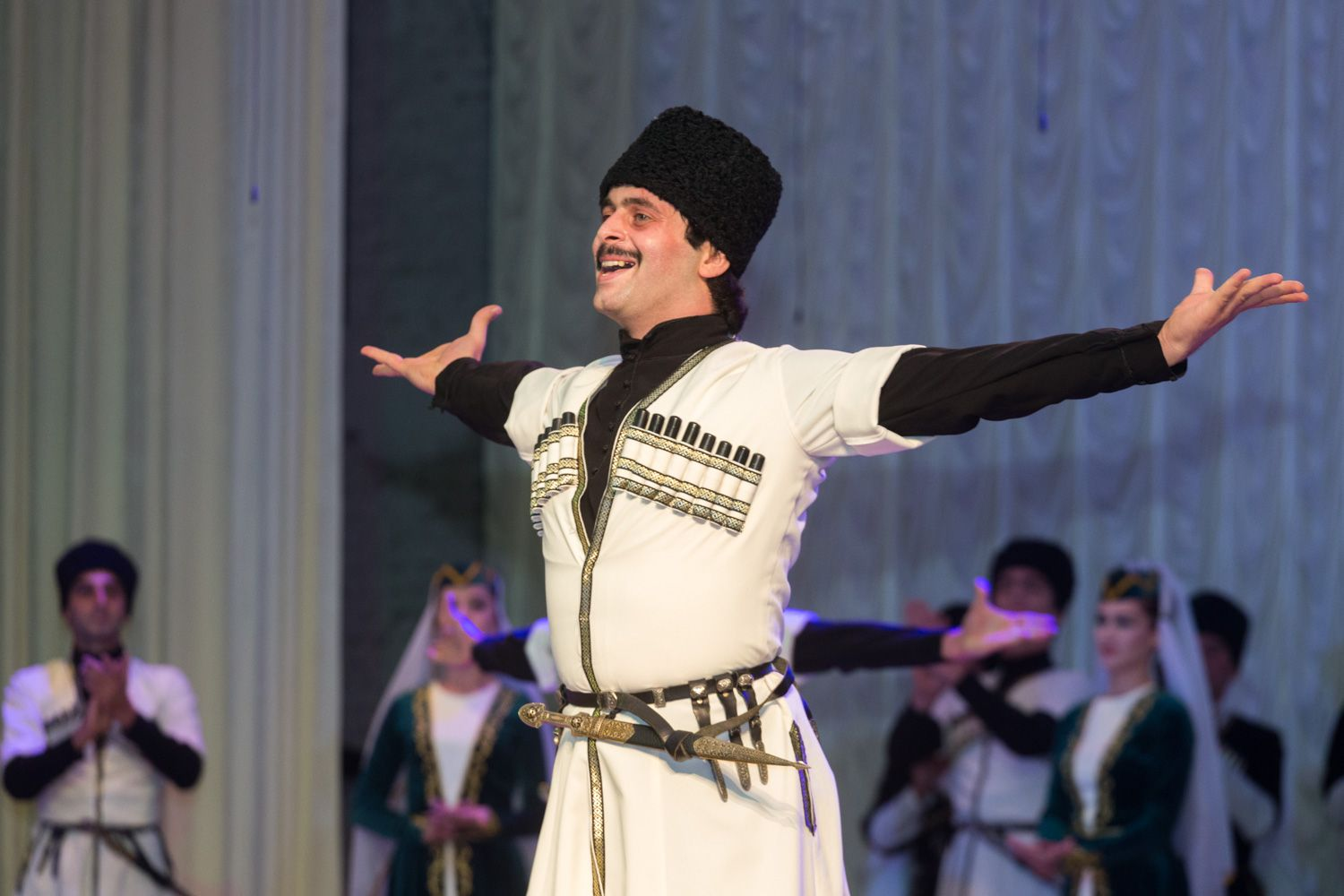

== See also ==
- List of national independence days
- Public holidays in Abkhazia
- War in Abkhazia (1992–1993)
- President of Abkhazia
- Minister for Defence of Abkhazia
- Abkhazian Armed Forces
- Abkhazian Air Force
