= 7th Military Base =

Russian military unit in Abkhazia

Coordinates: 43.104°N 40.579°E

- 7-я российская военная база
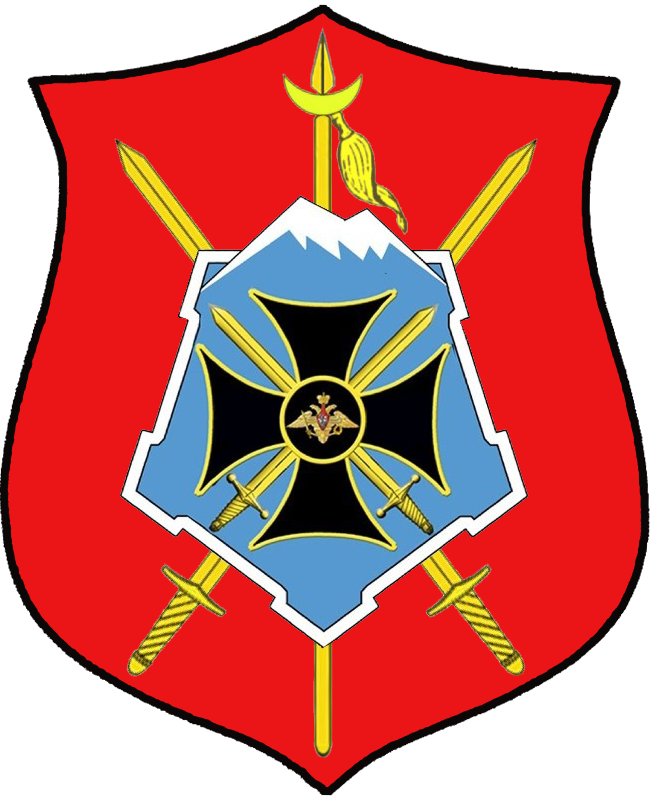
- Base emblem
- Active: 1 February 2009–Present
- Country: Soviet Union; Russia
- Branch: Russian Armed Forces
- Type: Task force/Military base
- Size: 4,500 soldiers
- Part of: 49th Combined Arms Army
- Headquarters: Gudauta
- Patron: Kuban Cossack army
- March: "Krasnodar Red Banner"

Commanders
- Current commander: Colonel Oleg Senkov

Insignia
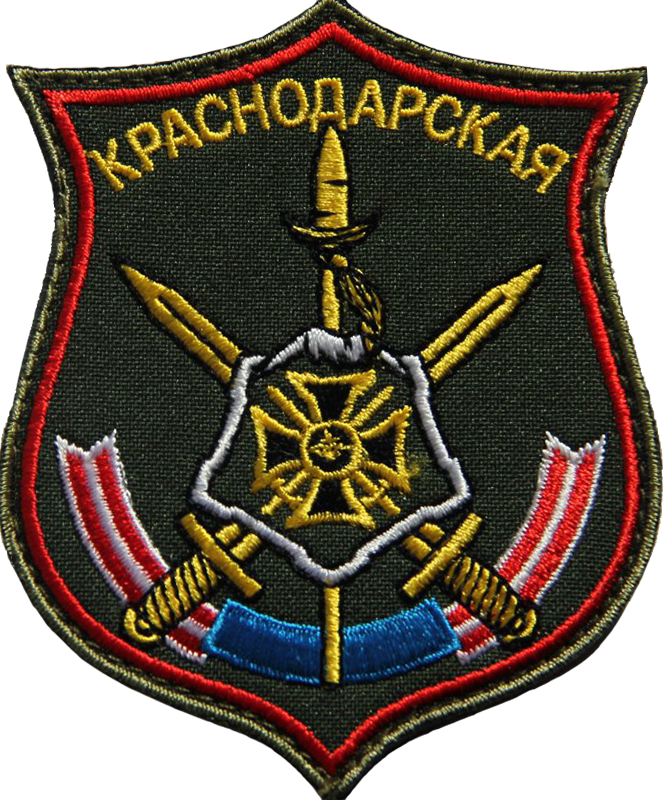
- Sleeve insignia

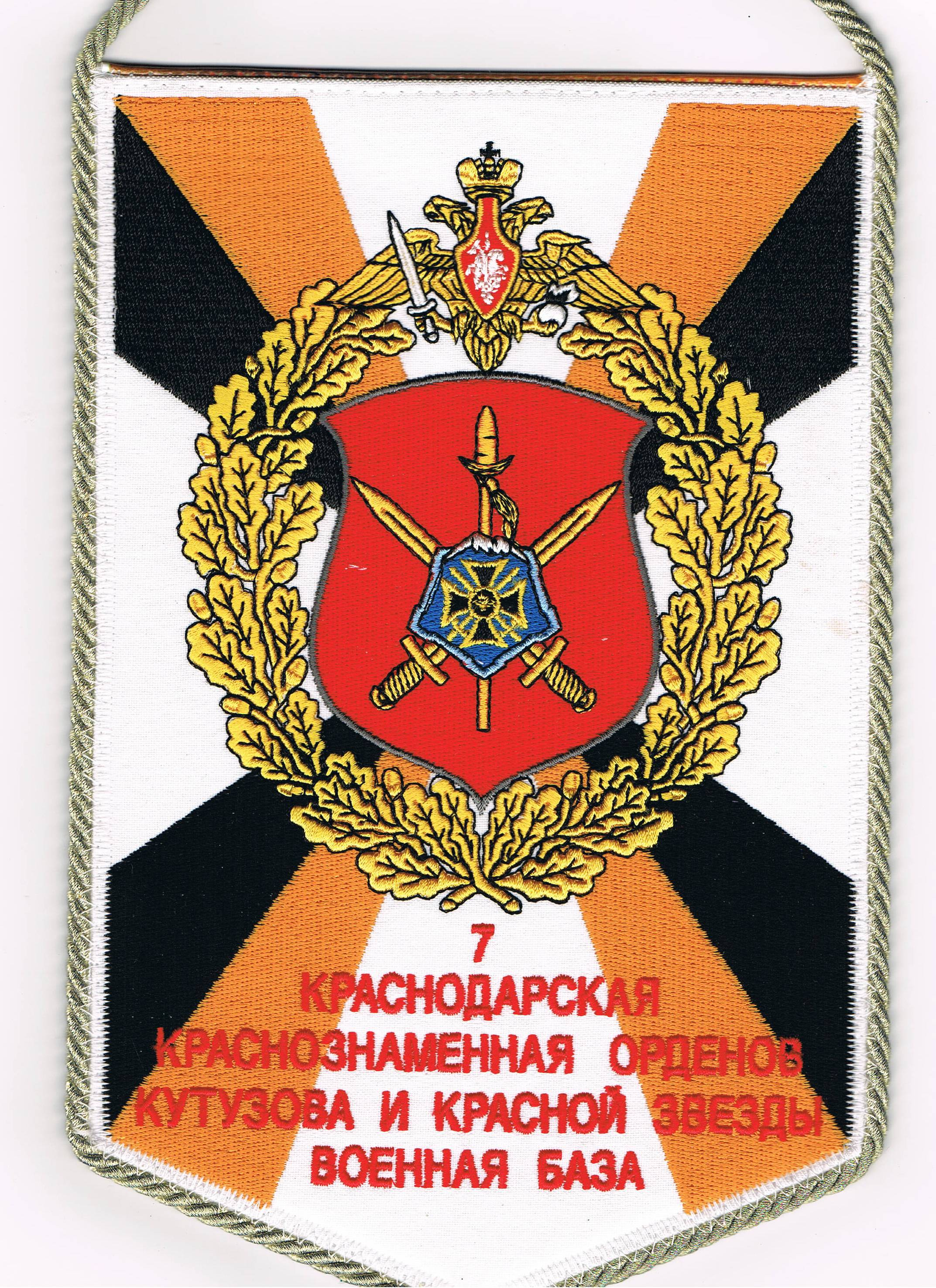
- Pennant

The 7th Military Base (Abkhaz: 7-тәи урыстәылатәи аруаа реиҳабыра риашара; Georgian: რუსეთის მე-7 სამხედრო ბაზა; Russian: 7-я российская военная база) is a sizable overseas military base of the Russian Armed Forces stationed in Bombora in the partially recognized Republic of Abkhazia. The base is subordinate to the command of the 49th Combined Arms Army and the Southern Military District of the Russian Armed Forces.

== History ==
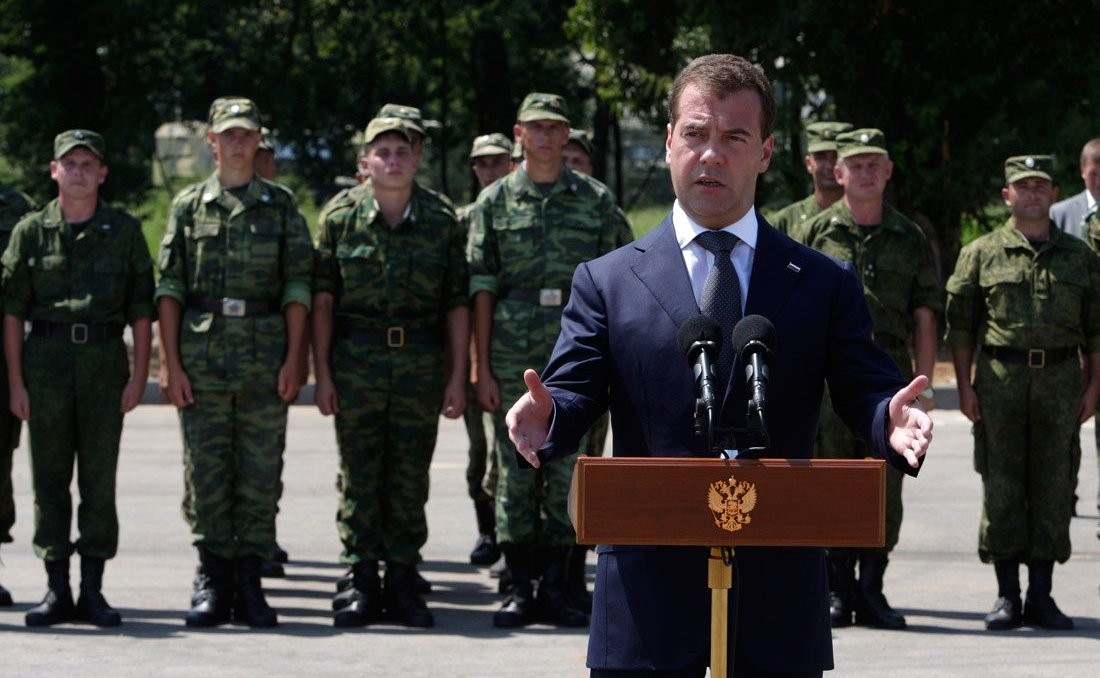
President Dmitry Medvedev addressing troops at the base, 8 August 2010.

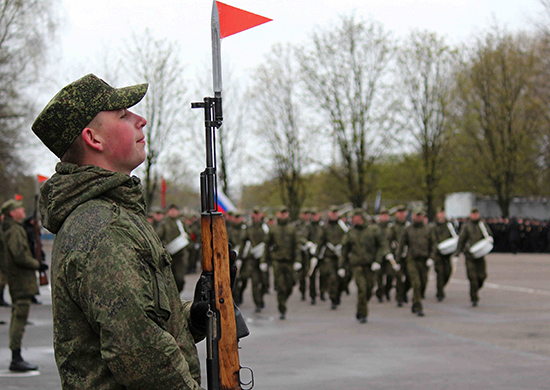
Independence Day celebrations at the 7th Military Base in 2017.

The base originated from the 131st Separate Motor Rifle Brigade, which was a unit of the Soviet Army and of the Russian Ground Forces. Following the Russo-Georgian War of 2008, it was decided that a permanent Russian military base was needed. On 1 February 2009, the brigade was reorganized and the 7th Krasnodar Red Banner Order of Kutuzov and Red Star Military Base was established. On 17 February, Russian President Dmitry Medvedev and Abkhazian leader Sergey Bagapsh signed an agreement on a unified Russian military base on the territory of Abkhazia.

Following the Russian-Abkhaz agreement, the united military base included former peacekeeping facilities" the Bamboura Airport located in the Gudauta area, a military training ground and part of the sea bay near Ochamchire, joint Russian-Abkhaz military garrisons deployed in the Kodori Valley and near the Enguri Dam. In addition, military-administrative and medical facilities (sanatoriums and rest homes) for the base were to be located in Sukhumi, Gagra, Gudauta, New Athos, Eshera and other settlements in the region. The period of operation of the base is 49 years, with the possibility of automatic renewal for subsequent 15-year periods. For combat training, the military training grounds in Gudauta as well as Molkin in the Krasnodar Territory are utilized. In 2015, preparatory work began on the construction and arrangement of social and military infrastructure facilities at the military base. Since 2016, the tank and motorized rifle units of the base have utilized the honorary title of "percussion".

== 100th anniversary ==
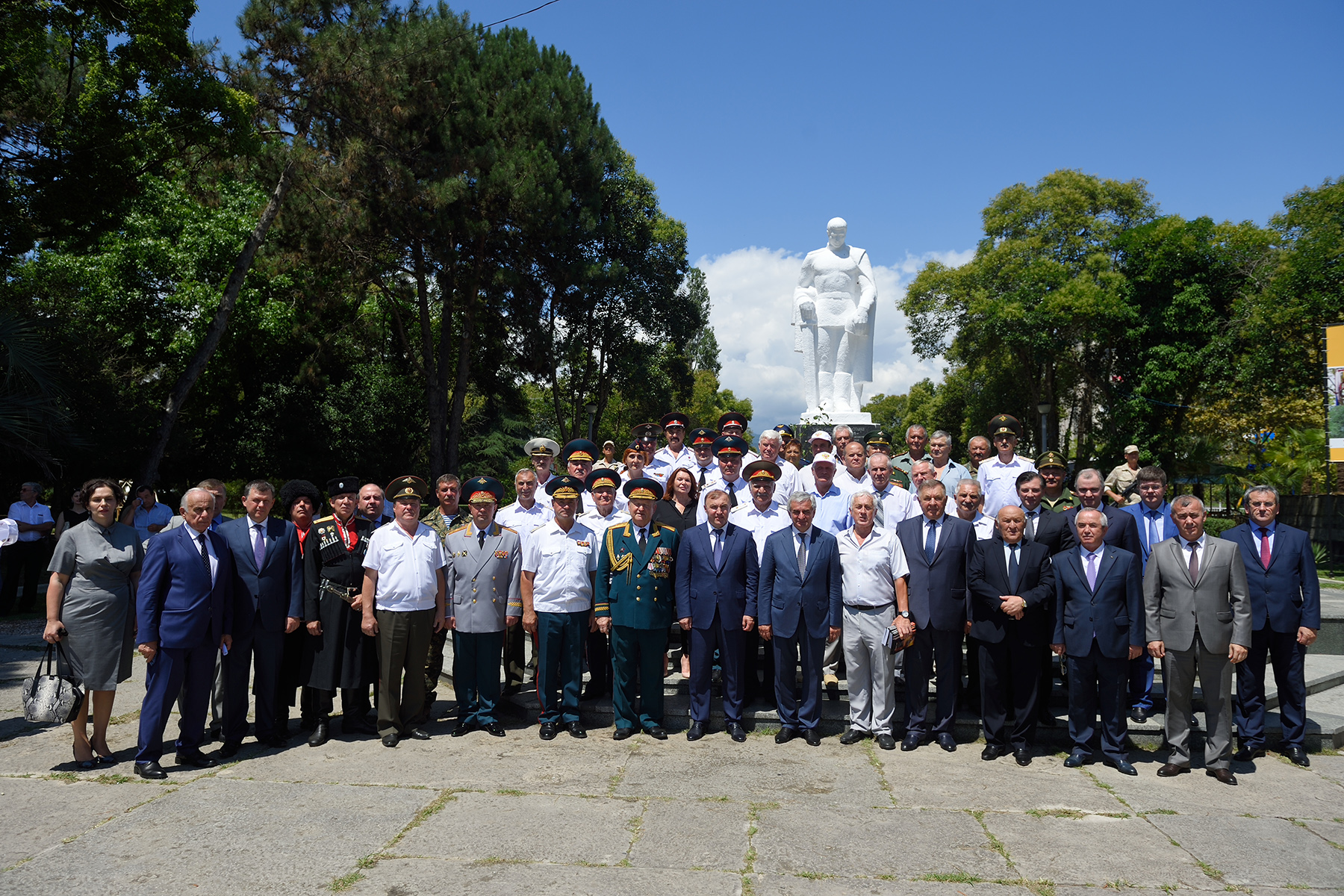
Base military personnel, unit veterans and the Abkhazian political leadership at the Tomb of the Unknown Soldier in Sukhumi.

In July 2018, the unit celebrated the centennial of its lineage. The anniversary celebrations' guests included the leadership of the Southern Military District, the 49th Combined Arms Army, and the Abkhazian Armed Forces. In the case of the latter, President Raul Khajimba was in attendance. At the invitation of Colonel Commander Igor Egorov, veterans of the unit arrived from Maykop, Krasnodar and other cities. The commander was awarded the highest award of the state; "Glory of Adygea".

== 2022 Russian invasion of Ukraine ==
In March 2022, elements of the 7th Military Base were redeployed to join the Russian invasion of Ukraine. According to the General Staff of the Ukrainian Armed Forces, they were organized into two battalion tactical groups, with a total number of 800 servicemen. On 31 March 2022, the Ukrainian military reported it had inflicted losses on the troops of the 7th Military Base at an unidentified location on the Eastern front.

== Commanders ==
- Colonel Sergey Chebotaryov (2007–2009)
- Major General Yakov Rezantsev (2011–2013)
- Major General Mikhail Kosobokov (2015–2017)
- Colonel Igor Yegorov (2017–2019)
- Colonel Oleg Senkov (2019–Present)

== Composition ==
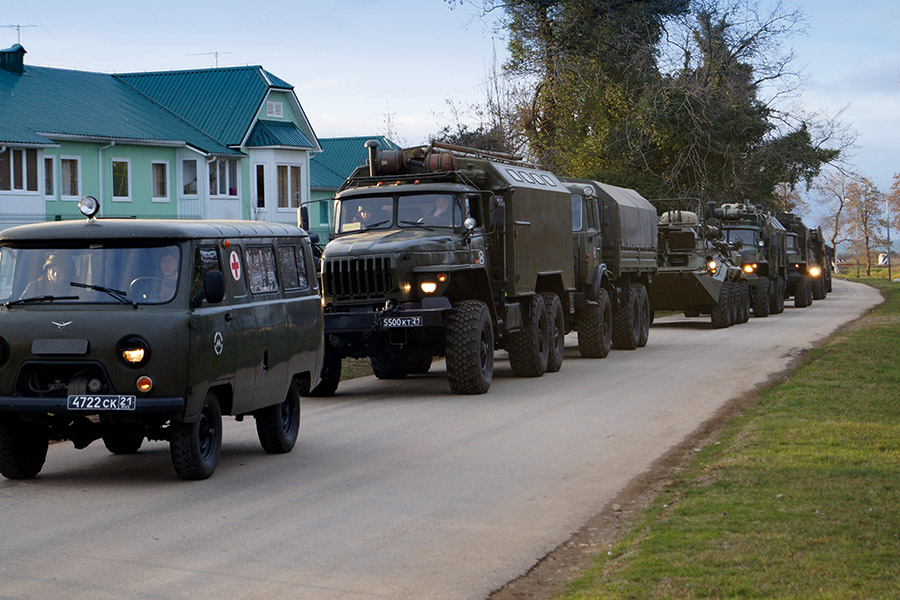
Military vehicles at the base.

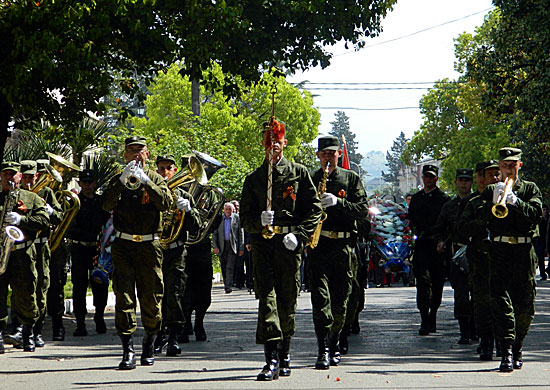
The band of the base.

- 526th Separate Motor Rifle Battalion (Military Unit No. 03768)
- 527th Separate Motor Rifle Battalion (Military Unit No. 03769)
- 529th Separate Motor Rifle Battalion (Military Unit No. 03841)
- 558th Separate Motor Rifle Battalion (Military Unit No. 03833)
- 9th Separate Tank Battalion (Military Unit No. 03842)
- S-400 and S-300 surface-to-air missile elements reported
- Other lighter support units

== See also ==
- List of Russian military bases abroad
- Operational Group of Russian Forces
- 4th Guards Military Base
