= 2007 Abkhazian local elections =

- 11 February 2007
- District and city assemblies (4th convocation)
Party	Leader	Vote %	Seats	+/–
Independents / Local Candidates				
This lists parties that won seats. See the complete results below.

On 11 February 2007, Abkhazia held local elections for the 4th convocations of its local assemblies.

== City of Sukhumi ==
The 26 seats of the Sukhumi Municipal assembly were contested by 66 candidates.

=== Reruns in constituencies no. 3, 19 and 26 ===
Elections in constituencies no. 3, 19 and 26 were judged invalid, in the latter two cases because turnout had not surpassed 25%. Reruns were scheduled for 1 April, with the nomination period running from 20 February to 12 March and the registration period from 13 to 22 March. A total of eleven candidates were nominated in the three constituencies. All eleven were successfully registered, but Aslan Muratia later withdrew from the election in constituency no. 3. In constituency no. 3, the student Daur Dgebia defeated Said Alania and Kiazo Agumava, in constituency no. 19 Rolan Alan, Head of the computer centre of the Sukhumi branch of the Novocherkassk Industrial College of Humanities defeated Mikhail Gabelia and Elza Khagba and in constituency no. 26, Roland Gamgia, Chief Specialist with the Municipal Financial Authority defeated Valerian Aslandzia, Timur Kishmaria and Jansukh Chamagua.

== Districts ==
In Sukhumi District, 13 candidates competed in 12 single-seat constituencies, in Gagra 53 candidates in 25 constituencies, in Gudauta 35 candidates in 29 constituencies, in Gulripshi 18 candidates in 15 constituencies and in Ochamchira 39 or 43 candidates in 32 constituencies. In Tkvarcheli 5 candidates stood unopposed while 12 constituencies had more than one candidates. In Gali, all 25 candidates stood unopposed. All elections were judged valid by the Election Commissions except for the election in Ochamchira's Shesheleti constituency where a typo had occurred on the ballot papers.
