= Bedia (village) =

Bedia Georgian: ბედია, Abkhaz: Бедиа
- Village
- Location within Georgia Location within Abkhazia
- Coordinates: 42°43′34″N 41°38′35″E
- Country: Georgia
- Partially recognized independent country: Abkhazia
- District: Gali

Population (2011)
  - Total: 288
- Time zone: UTC+3 (MSK)
  - Summer (DST): UTC+4

Bedia (Georgian: ბედია; Abkhaz: Бедиа) is a village in the Gali Municipality/Tkvarcheli District of Abkhazia, a breakaway region of Georgia. As a result of the Georgian dispute over the sovereignty of Abkhazia, Georgia claims the village as part of its Gali Municipality. As of 2011, the village had a population of 288, of which 85.5% were ethnic Georgians and 13.6% were ethnic Abkhaz, with 2 others living in the village.

== History ==
According to the medieval Georgian Chronicles, Egros, son of Togarmah, inherited the land between the Likhi Range, Black Sea and upper Khazar River where he settled and found a city Egrisi, which is now called Bedia.

== See also ==
- Bedia Cathedral
