= Lashkendar =

Lashkendari
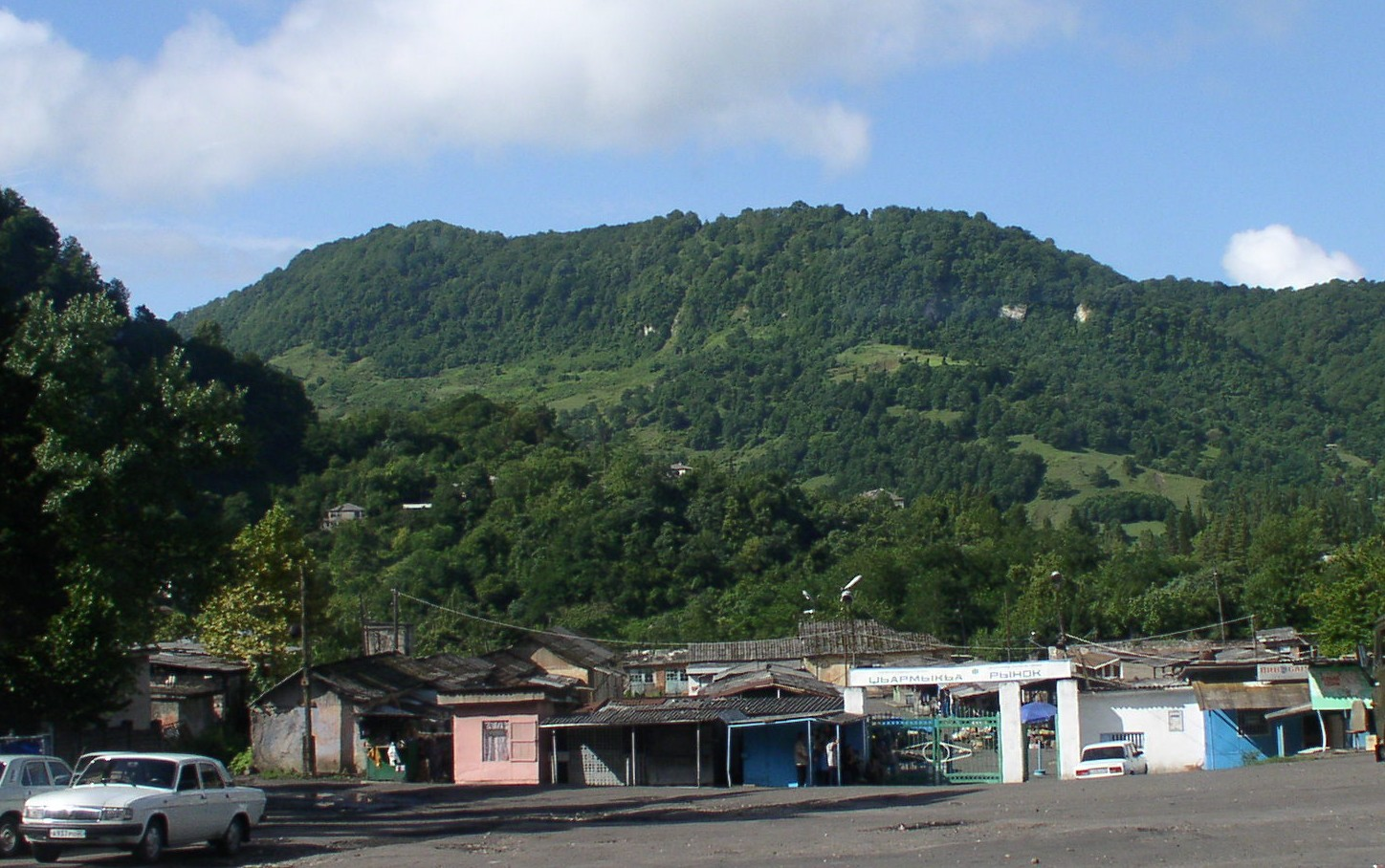
- View of the mountain from Tkvarcheli market square

Highest point
- Elevation: 1,373 m (4,505 ft)
- Coordinates: 42°49′01″N 41°44′29″E

Geography
- Location within Georgia
- Location: Abkhazia, Georgia

Lashkendar (Georgian: ლაშკენდერი, romanized: lashk'enderi) is a mountain in Abkhazia. Its main summit is 1,373 m (4,505 ft) high. The mountain is one of the seven shrines of the Abkhaz people. There are also ruins of a Christian temple on one of its lesser summits (945 m (3,100 ft)) featuring bas-reliefs of leopards (or possibly dogs). The date of its construction is disputed with estimates ranging from 7th to 11th century.

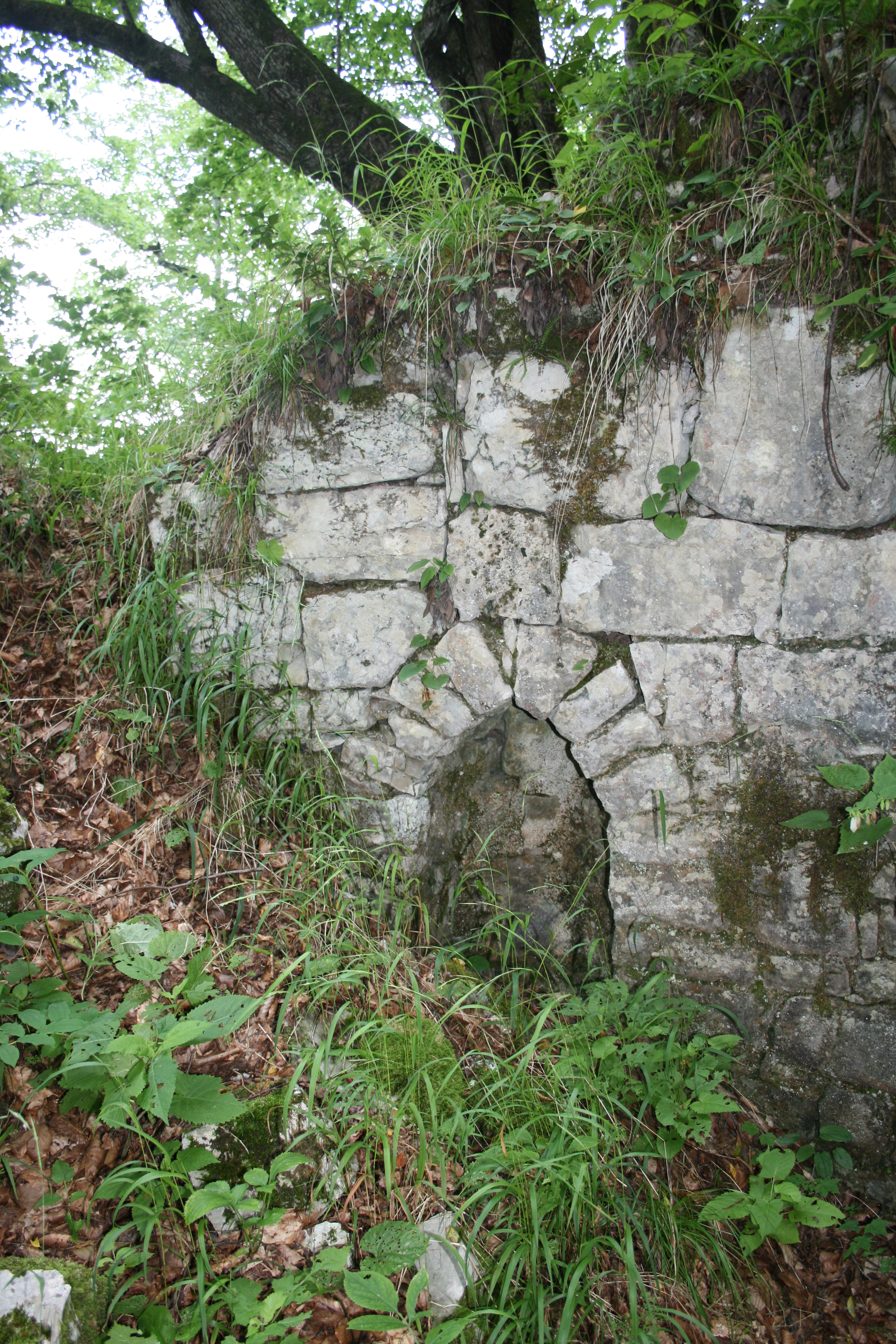
Temple ruins
