= Bediha =

Bediha, Bedia is a Turkish feminine given name. It may refer to:

- Bediha Gün (born 1994), Turkish freestyle wrestler
- Bediha Tacyıldız (born 1996), Turkish Muaythai practitioner and kickboxer
- Bediha Tunadağı (born 1995), Turkish weightlifter

== See also ==
- Bedia
