= Tkvarcheli District =

District of Abkhazia, Georgia

Tkvarcheli District ტყვარჩელის რაიონი Тҟәарчал араион Ткварчелский район
- District
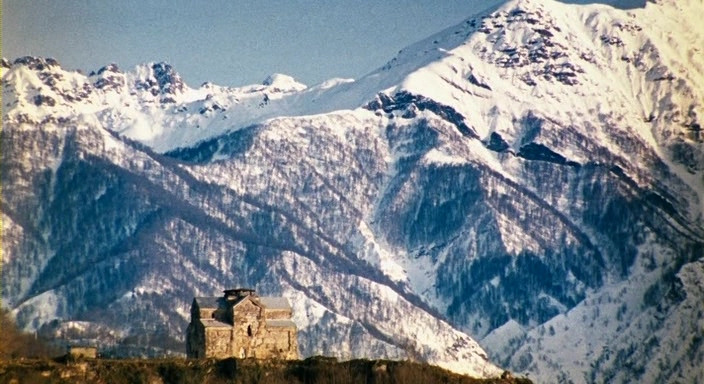
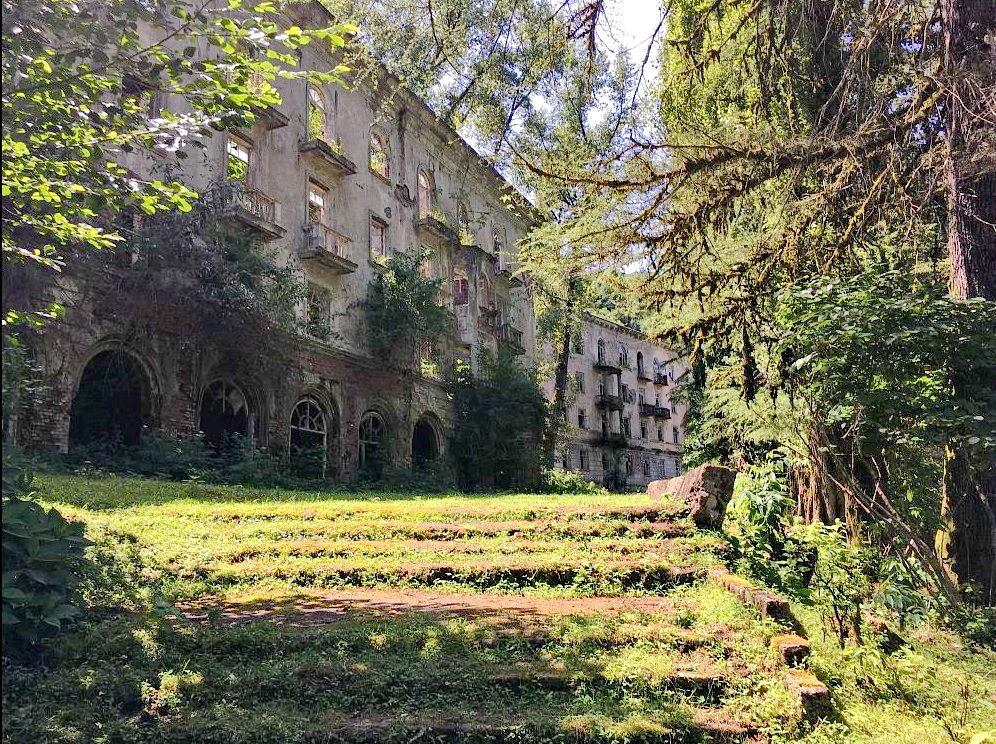
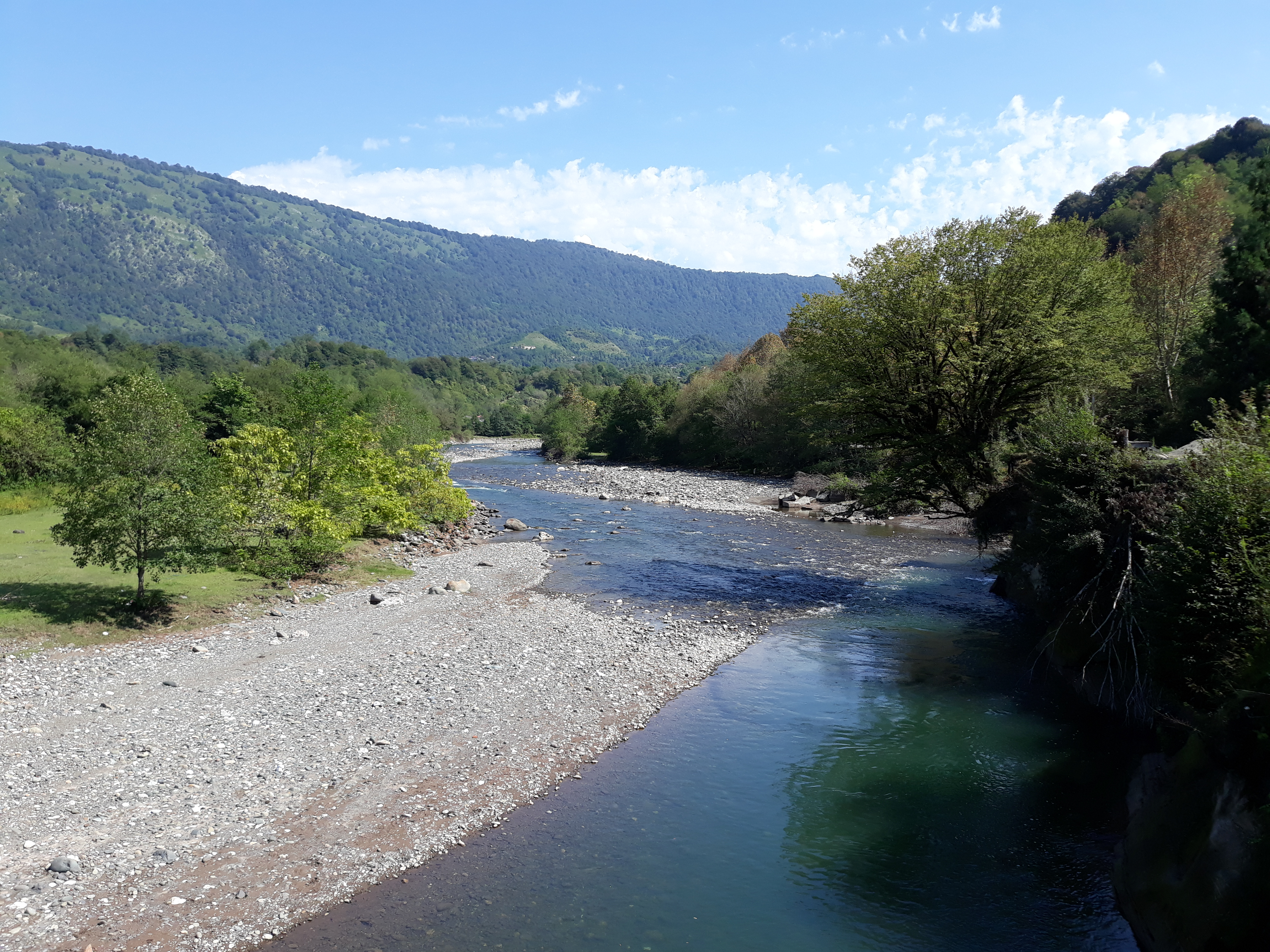
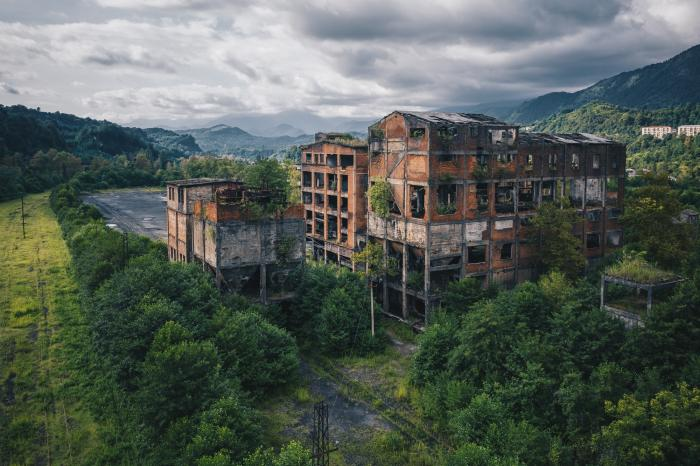
- From the top to bottom-right, Bedia Cathedral, Akarmara, Ghalidzga River, Tkvarcheli, Lashkendar Temple
- Location of Tkvarcheli District in Abkhazia
- Coordinates: 42.8333°N 41.7500°E
- Country: Georgia
- De facto state: Abkhazia (Note: The political status of Abkhazia is disputed. Having unilaterally declared independence from Georgia in 1992, Abkhazia is formally recognised as an independent state by 4 UN member states (three other states previously recognised it but then withdrew their recognition), while the remainder of the international community recognizes it as de jure Georgian territory. Georgia continues to claim the area as its own territory, designating it as Russian-occupied territory.)
- Capital: Tkvarcheli

Government
  - Governor: Aida Chachkhalia

Area
  - Total: 544 km^{2} (210 sq mi)

Population (2011)
  - Total: 16,012
  - Density: 29.4/km^{2} (76.2/sq mi)
- Time zone: UTC+3 (MSK)

Tkvarcheli District (Georgian: ტყვარჩელის რაიონი, Abkhaz: Тҟәарчал араион, Russian: Ткварчелский район) is one of the districts of Abkhazia. It has no equivalent Georgian district, as it was newly formed in 1995 from parts of Ochamchira District and Gali District, centered on its eponymous capital, Tkvarcheli. The population of the district was 14,477 at the time of the 2003 census. By the 2011 census, it had increased to 16,012. Of note is Bedia Cathedral located within the district.

== Demographics ==
At the time of the 2011 census, the population of the district was 16,012. The ethnic composition of the population was as follows:

- Georgians (62.05%)
- Abkhaz (32.0%)
- Russians (3.4%)
- Ukrainians (0.4%)
- Armenians (0.3%)
- Greeks (0.1%)

== Economy ==
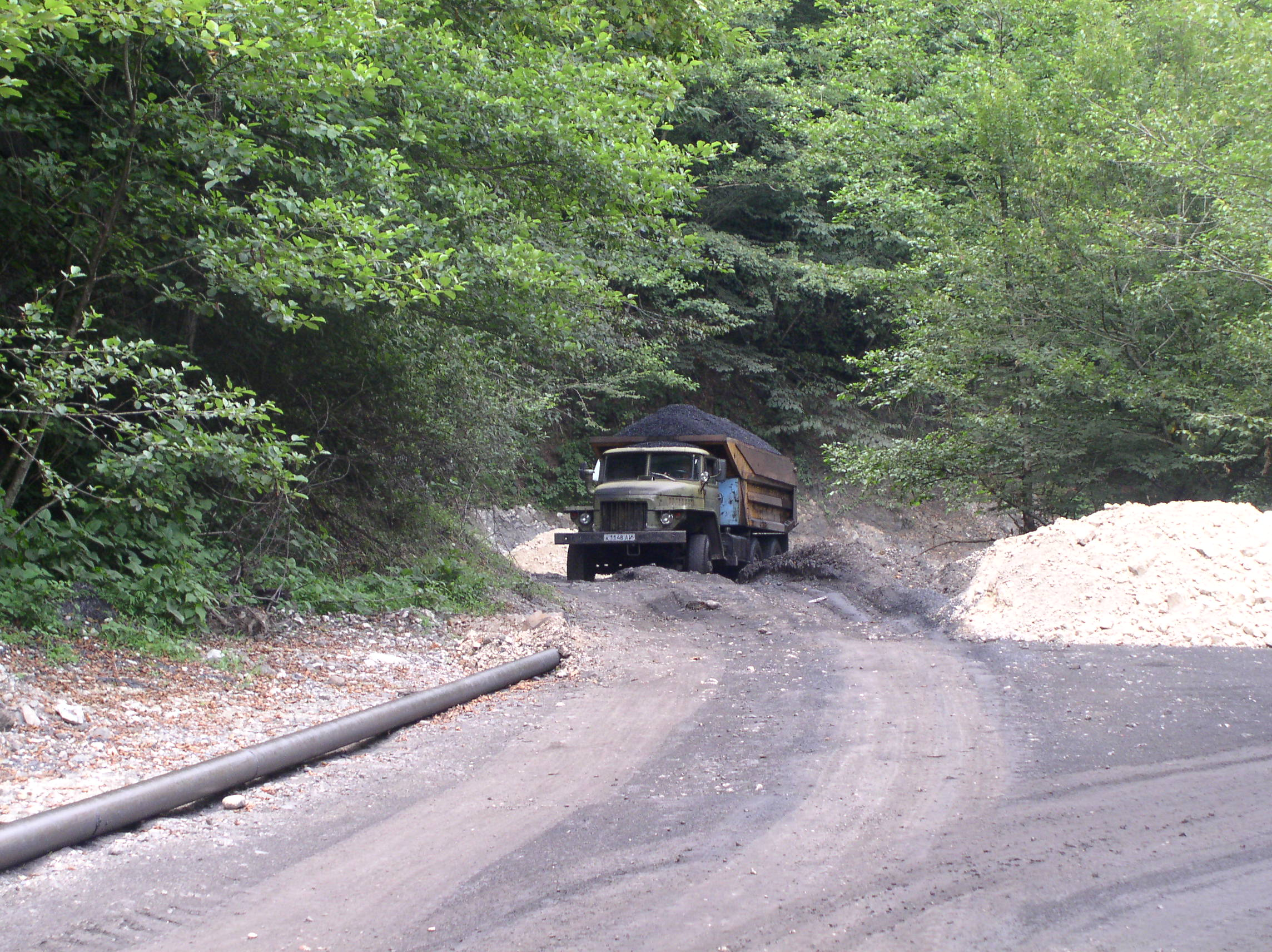
Coal is transported via pipeline (to the left) and trucks from the mines in Tkvarcheli district

The coal-mining carried out by the Turkish Tamsaş company is the district's main industry and source of income as Tamsaş's tax payments account for 75% of its budget. The company was criticised for neglecting environmental requirements. Construction of a new cement plant is planned now, its output to be used for the Olympic construction projects in Sochi.

== Administration ==
Valeri Kharchilava was reappointed as Administration Head on 10 May 2001 following the March 2001 local elections.

On 27 March 2003, Kharchilava announced at a meeting of the Cabinet of Ministers that he wanted to resign. On 31 March 2003, First Deputy Minister for Foreign Affairs Daur Arshba was appointed the new Administration Head.

On 22 March 2005, newly elected President Sergei Bagapsh dismissed Daur Arshba and appointed Timur Gogua in his stead. On 23 February 2007, before the local elections, President Bagapsh temporarily prolonged Timur Gogua's tenure as Head of the District Administration. After Gogua was re-elected to the District Assembly, he was permanently re-appointed on 21 March.

On 2 June 2014, following the 2014 Abkhazian political crisis, acting President Valeri Bganba dismissed Timur Gogua, as had been demanded by protesters, and appointed his Deputy Zurab Argunia as acting District Head. Following the election of Raul Khajimba as President, he on 3 November appointed Aida Chachkhalia as District Head in Argunia's stead.

=== List of Administration Heads ===
#	Name	Entered office	Left office	President	Comments
Heads of the District Administration:
	Valeri Kharchilava	≤ May 2001	31 March 2003	Vladislav Ardzinba	
	Daur Arshba	31 March 2003	22 March 2005	Vladislav Ardzinba	
	Timur Gogua	22 March 2005	29 May 2011	Sergei Bagapsh	
	Timur Gogua	29 May 2011	2 June 2014	Alexander Ankvab	
	Zurab Argunia	2 June 2014	3 November 2014	Valeri Bganba	Acting
	Aida Chachkhalia	3 November 2014	Present	Raul Khajimba	

== Settlements ==
The district's main settlements are:

- Tkvarcheli
