= Siege of Tkvarcheli =

Battle during the 1992–93 War in Abkhazia

- Part of the 1992–1993 War in Abkhazia
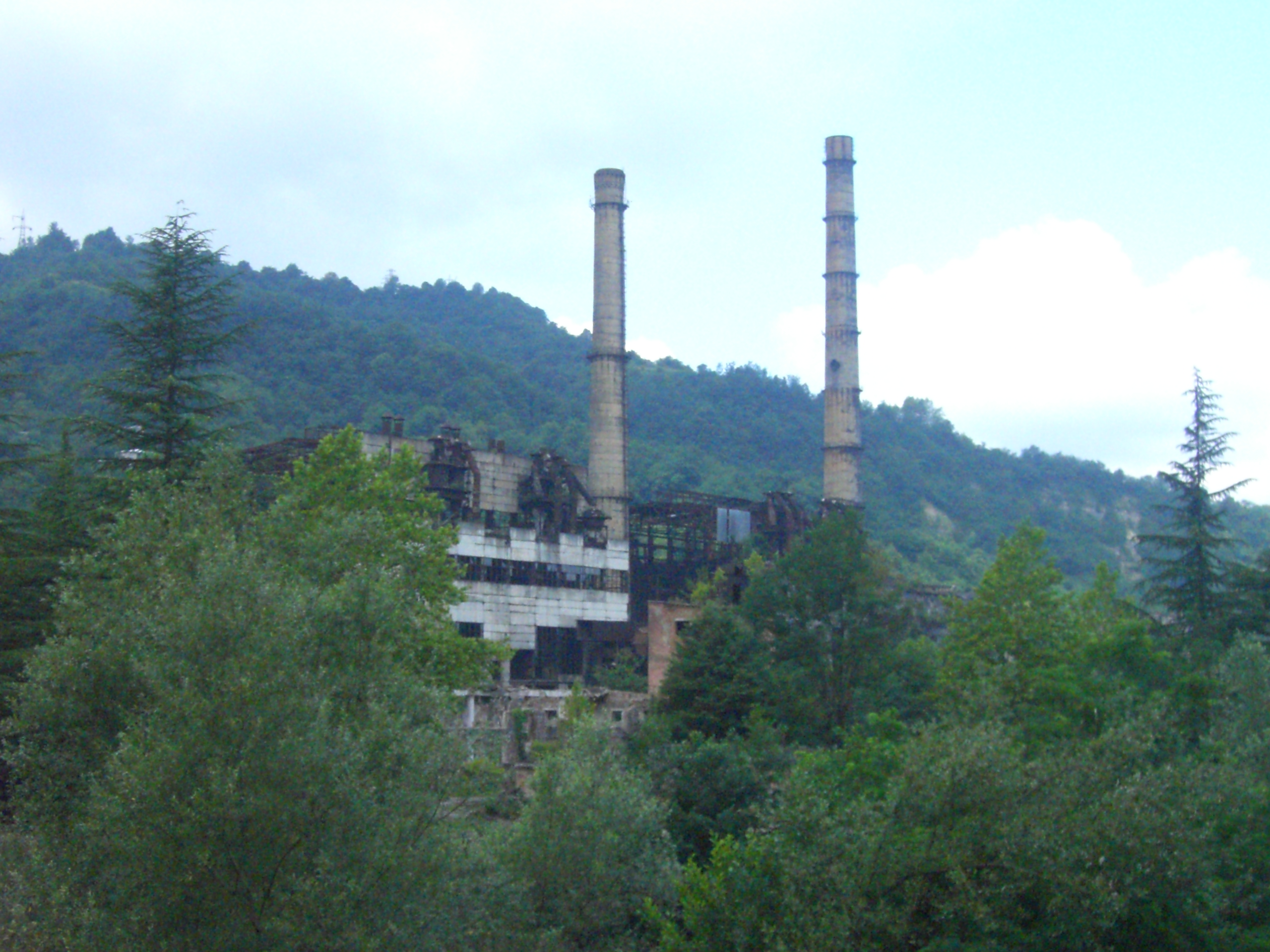
- The town's power plant was bombed in the first days of the siege and the town had to live without electricity for nearly a year
Date	October 1992 – 29 September 1993
Location	Tkvarcheli, Abkhazia, Georgia 42°50′51″N 41°41′06″E
Result	Abkhazian-North Caucasian victory: Siege lifted

Belligerents
Abkhazia; CMPC	Georgia

Units involved
National Guard of Abkhazia	Georgian National Guard

Siege of Tkvarcheli was a military engagement during the 1992–93 War in Abkhazia. The siege was undertaken by the Georgian armed forces and lasted from October 1992 to September 1993, almost the entire duration of the war, but was eventually unsuccessful. It was accompanied by inconclusive fighting in surrounding villages. Russian aid, both humanitarian and military, was critical for the defence of the town which suffered a severe humanitarian crisis during the siege.

== 1992 ==
Tkvarcheli is located in the eastern part of Abkhazia, which after the war became de facto independent, but is still generally recognised as de jure part of Georgia. According to the last pre-war census (1989), it had a population of 21,744, with ethnic Abkhaz (42.3%), Russian (24.5%) and Georgian (23.4%) communities but a bulk of the Georgian population left the town shortly after the Georgian-Abkhazian fighting erupted in August 1992.

Along with Gudauta on the Black Sea, Tkvarcheli became the main Abkhazian stronghold throughout the war. In October 1992, a Georgian contingent began to lay siege to the town, creating a severe humanitarian crisis in that region. Since the town had a sizeable Russian community, the Russian military actively intervened in the crisis, delivering both humanitarian and military support to besieged Tkvarcheli. Russian military helicopters regularly flew to the town, supplying it with food and medicine, evacuated many civilians and assisting the defenders against the Georgian forces. Many Russian-trained and Russian-paid fighters were transported to the area to take part in the fighting.

As several cease-fire agreements failed, the hostilities intensified towards December 1992. The fighting was marked by extreme confusion and frequently indiscriminate fire on all sides. Following the loss of Gagra to Abkhazian forces commanded by Chechen warlord Shamil Basayev, Georgian troops retaliated by shelling Tkvarcheli. The Russian army attempted to re-establish an air bridge, but on December 14, 1992, it suffered the loss of a Mi-8 helicopter carrying evacuees, which resulted in 52 to 64 deaths (including 25 children). Although Georgian authorities denied any responsibility, many believed the helicopter had been shot down by Georgian forces. On 16 December, the government of Georgia requested the Russians to evacuate their nationals from Abkhazia via other routes, foremost the Black Sea, but also to limit the number of missions flown from Gudauta, the main Russian air base in the area.

== 1993 ==
The helicopter incident catalysed more concerted Russian military intervention on behalf of the Abkhazian side. As the Abkhazian troops intensified their efforts to take hold of the zone around Abkhazia's capital Sukhumi in early 1993, the fighting for Tkvarcheli also became fiercer and spilled over into the neighbouring villages when the besieged Abkhazian troops attempted several sorties. In February 1993, Abkhaz fighters attacked the Georgian village of Kvirauri, just outside Tkvarcheli, and took some 500 civilians hostage, threatening to kill them unless Georgian forces ended their offensive in the neighbouring Ochamchira District.

A temporary ceasefire allowed the Russians to carry out the largest humanitarian operation in Tkvarcheli on June 16, 1993, evacuating several hundreds of civilians with 30 Kamaz trucks and 2 buses through the corridor offered by the Georgian army. The Georgians claimed, however, that a great deal of weaponry and ammunitions were simultaneously delivered to Tkvarcheli. A turning point in the battle occurred July 14, 1993, when a Russian landing group ousted Georgian units from the dominant heights around Tkvarcheli. Abkhazian forces failed to relieve the siege, but the town became much less vulnerable to Georgian fire from then on.

On the morning of September 16, 1993, Abkhazian forces, supported by strong reinforcements from the North Caucasus, broke a Russian-brokered ceasefire and launched simultaneous attacks against Sukhumi, Ochamchira and Georgian forces blockading Tkvarcheli. The Georgians were caught by surprise and, after several days of intense fighting, Sukhumi fell to Abkhazian troops September 27, 1993. Now, the Georgian troops at Tkvarcheli themselves came under the threat of being besieged and retreated. By September 29, 1993, the siege had been lifted.
