= Bedia Cathedral =

Medieval Georgian Orthodox cathedral

Bedia Cathedral ბედიის მონასტერი
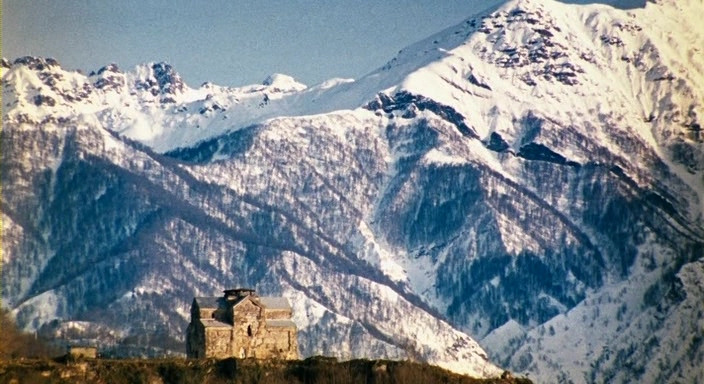
- Bedia Cathedral and the Caucasus Mountains in the background.

- Location within Georgia Location within Abkhazia

Religion
- Affiliation: Georgian Orthodox Church
- District: Ochamchire Municipality
- Region: Caucasus

Location
- Location: Bedia, Tkvarcheli District, Abkhazia / Agubedia, Ochamchire Municipality, Georgia
- Coordinates: 42.7672°N 41.6689°E

Architecture
- Architect: Avtandil Shulavreli
- Type: Domed cruciform plan
- Style: Georgian; Cathedral
- Groundbreaking: Late 10th century
- Completed: 999, during the reign of King Bagrat II of Abkhazia
- Domes: 1; the dome and drum are collapsed

Immovable Cultural Monument of National Significance of Georgia
- Official name: Bedia Monastery
- Designated: November 7, 2006; 19 years ago
- Reference no.: 3542
- Item Number in Cultural Heritage Portal: 9683
- Date of entry in the registry: October 3, 2007; 18 years ago

Bedia Cathedral (Georgian: ბედიის მონასტერი) is a medieval Georgian Orthodox cathedral located in Bedia, in the Tkvarcheli district of Abkhazia (or Ochamchire Municipality according to the Georgia's subdivision), a disputed region on the Black Sea coast.

Bedia Cathedral was originally built at the close of the 10th century and consecrated in 999 on the behest of King Bagrat II of Abkhazia, who would go on to become the first King of the Georgia as Bagrat III and who was interred at the church after his death. The extant edifices, however, date back to the 13th-14th centuries and include a domed cruciform church, a belltower resting upon the northern narthex and the ruins of an old palace. The southern wall of the main church contains fragments of contemporary murals, including the portraits of Bagrat II and the representatives of the Dadiani noble family of Georgia.

In the Catholicate of Abkhazia, Bedia was the centre of a diocese and the seat of a bishop. In the 17th century, services were ceased, but resumed from the second half of the 19th century onwards.

== Historical - architectural description ==
As evidenced by the historic sources, complex was erected in late 10th century, c. 999, by Bagrat III, the first king of the united Georgian Kingdom, who, as stated by the Georgian chronicler, “made a Bishop out of it”. The church of the Virgin, erected in the centre of the monastic courtyard, is the main church of the monastery. To its west is the two-storied palace of metropolitans of Bedia. The church of the Virgin was considerably transformed between 13th to 15th centuries. The bell-tower is a 12th-14th cc. structure, while the Bishops' Palace was built in the 16th century by Anton Zhuanisdze, a Georgian Metropolitan of Bedia. Three layers of mural decoration are preserved in the church interior, which date back the 10th-11th, 13th-14th, and 16th-17th cc. bell-tower, ground floor of which functions as a gate to the monastery, while from the south the two-storied Episcopal palace is adjoined.

Facades of the Bedia church, its interior murals and ecclesiastic objects preserved lapidary inscriptions in Georgian Asomtavruli (uncial) script, bearing evidences on the construction, renovation and restoration of the church. Over the centuries, Bedia Episcopal See was one of the most significant ecclesiastical, cultural and educational centre of Georgia. Archbishop Anton Zhuanisdze had established a rich library in the Bedia monastery, where old manuscripts were renovated and restored, theological treatises were translated and the library collection was enriched with new manuscripts. Bedia monastic complex is a symbol of unity and indivisibility of Georgia. Bagrat III, the first king of the united Georgian kingdom and his mother, Queen Gurandukht are buried in Bedia.

Bedia church landscape characteristic to the Middle Ages Georgian architecture was being created on such an ensemble of planning. A church capped with a cupola represented the main architectural element of the ensemble.

The complex was surrounded with a fence. On its west side, in the line of the fence wall, there is a bishop’s palace and a doorway included.

The ruins of the bishop’s palace are located in the west of the church, in approximately 50 meters’ distance. In the beginning, it consisted of two stories. Nowadays, the second floor is almost totally destroyed, only the fragments of the north-west corner and western wall are remained.

The door that leads to the second store-room contains a timpani stone bearing an inscription on it, in which the spiritual Georgian workers of the 16th century such as the archbishop of Bedia, Anton Zhuanidze, and restorer Kirile Zhuanidze, are mentioned. The arc entrance is adorned with decorative ornaments.

Inter-story roofing was repaired during the restoration of 1968-69 the floor was concreted and onto it, an isolation stratum was arranged from a thin layer of the tar, which prevents the first floor from water leakage. The doorway is located in the western part of the complex, on top of which a bell tower of the church was arranged. On its west, on the façade, there is an inscription in which Giorgi Dadiani and King Constantine are mentioned, living in the 14th century. The building of the doorway is joined to the palace and is perceived as one whole. The doorway represents a planning square.

The church with a cupola is the central building of the complex, typically similar to so-called “inserted cross”. In the plan, it is a cross inscribed in the rectangle. In the center of the church, on the square that we see on the crossroads of the cross arms, a cupola consisting of 14 facets is made by means of sails, in which the windows of the same quantity are cut. The cupola is based on two separately standing pillars in the west, and on the apses in the east. The eastern arm of the cross ends with an apse, whilst the remaining arms are rectangular. The space that is left between the arms of the cross is filled with two-storied store-rooms located beside the apses on the east, and by additional spaces on the west. The smaller floor located beside the apses represents a mass of entire wall, in which a small door is cut.

The upper gallery is located on the second floor of the northern and southern naves. One can ascend by a ladder. The church has three entrances. A cupola is erased exactly in the center of the church. From the outside, the church is built with a cleanly trimmed sandstone. All the windows of the church are preserved. In the interior, their contour is safe. On the facades, besides two of them, all the windows are damaged. They have no adornments.

In the end of the 19th century, the Bedia Church already represented a depopulated edifice, covered with plants, however, the big part of the cupola was preserved and the laying of apses was better protected. After this, in the beginning of the 20th century, with the aim to “renovate” the church, Russian monks and nuns totally removed the damaged cupola and took out the easily removable stones.

== Gallery ==
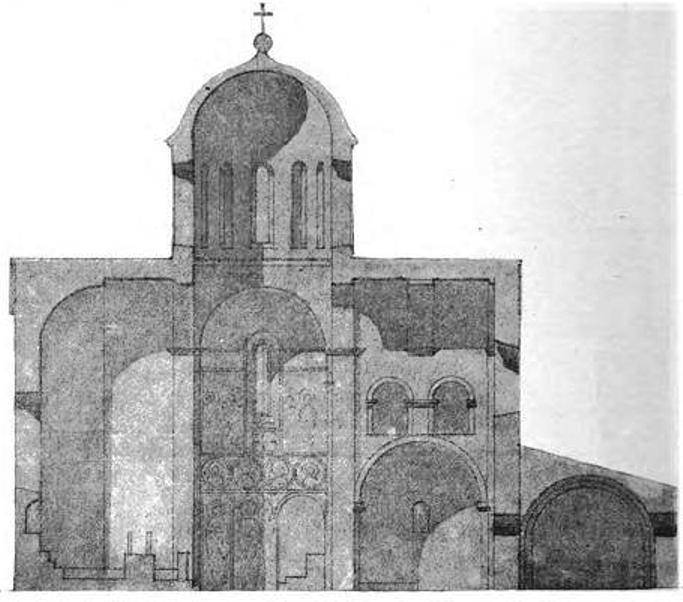

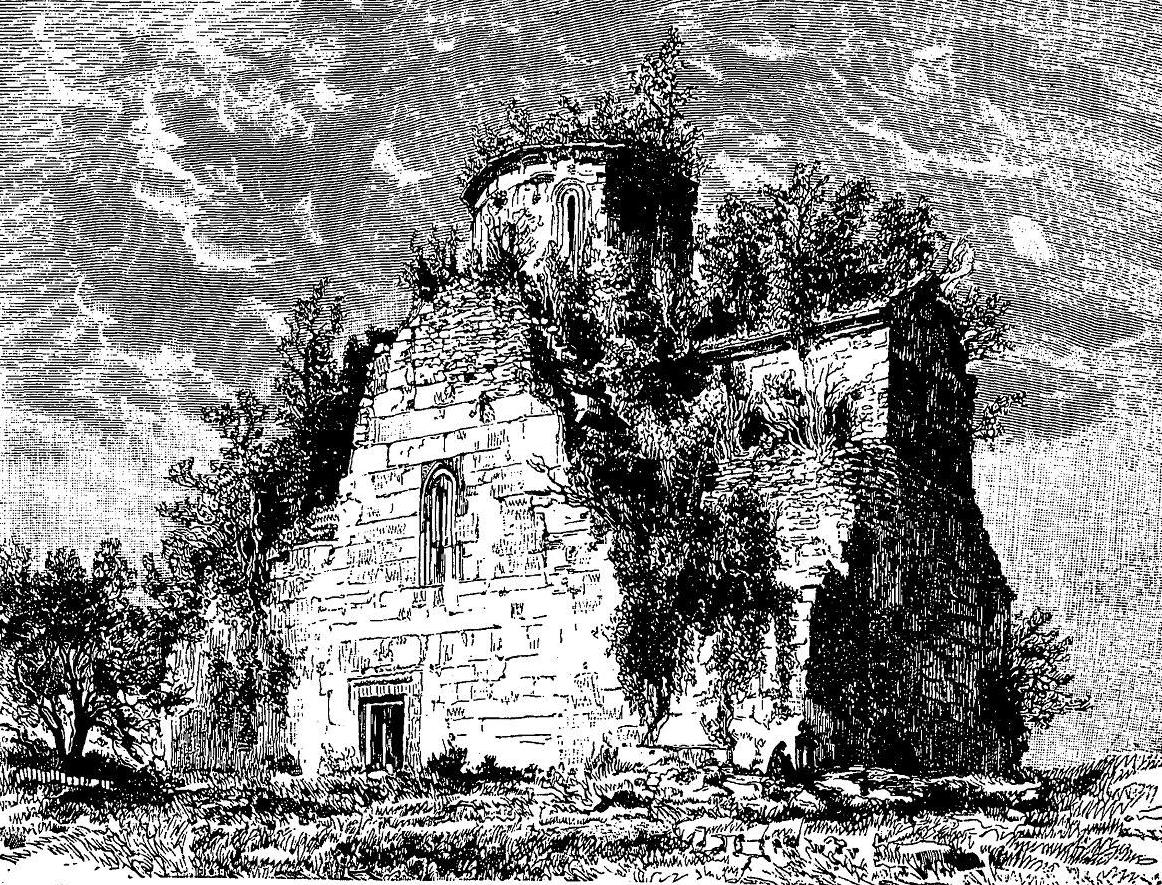

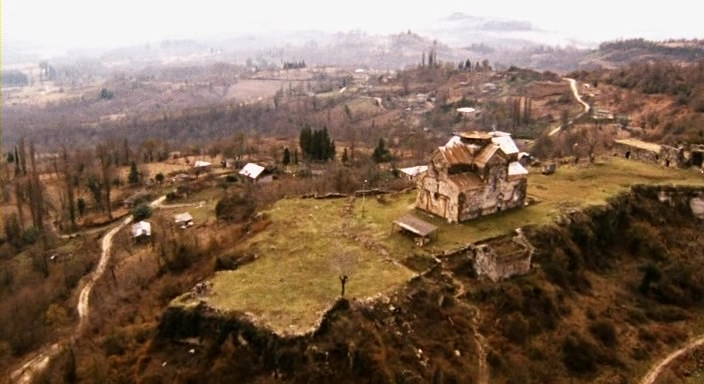

== See also ==
- Ghumurishi Church

== Literature ==
- Kudava, Buba (2026). "An Abkhazian Bagrationi: Three Stories of Bagrat III". Sokhumi.
