= Tkvarcheli =

Tkvarcheli ტყვარჩელი, Тҟəарчал, Ткварчели Tqvarcheli, Tqwarchal, Tkvarcheli
- Town
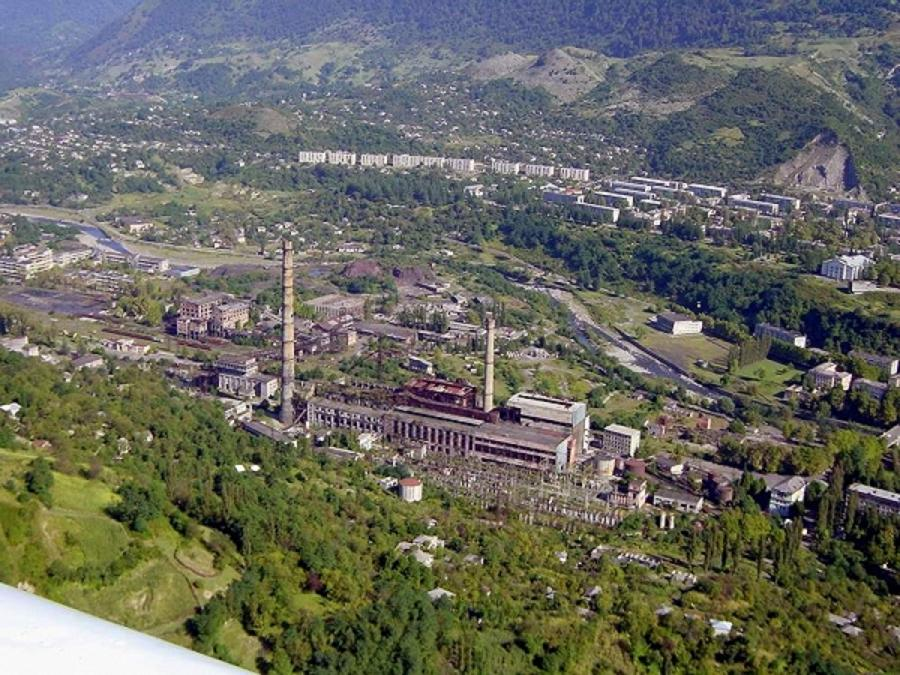
- Aerial view of the town

- Location within Georgia Location within Abkhazia
- Coordinates: 42°51′N 41°41′E
- Country: Georgia
- Partially recognized independent country: Abkhazia
- District: Tkvarcheli

Population (2011)
  - Total: 5,013
- Time zone: UTC+03:00 (MSK)
  - Summer (DST): UTC+04:00

Tkvarcheli (Georgian: ტყვარჩელი [tʼqʼʷaɾtʃʰeli]; Abkhaz: Тҟəарчал, Tqwarchal; Ткуарчал, Tkuarchal; Russian: Ткварчели, Tkvarcheli) is a town in Abkhazia, (Note: The political status of Abkhazia is disputed. Having unilaterally declared independence from Georgia in 1992, Abkhazia is formally recognised as an independent state by 4 UN member states (three other states previously recognised it but then withdrew their recognition), while the remainder of the international community recognizes it as de jure Georgian territory. Georgia continues to claim the area as its own territory, designating it as Russian-occupied territory.) a breakaway region of Georgia. It is situated on the river Ghalidzga and a railway connects it with Ochamchire. Akarmara, an area within the town, is a ghost town with abandoned apartments and factories which became uninhabited in the early 1990s due to the War in Abkhazia (1992–1993), and is home to just 35 residents today.

== History ==
Coal mining, which began in the area in 1935, grew in importance during the Second World War, especially after the Donbas was lost during the German invasion of the Soviet Union. Tkvarcheli was given town status on 9 April 1942.

During the War in Abkhazia (1992–1993), Tkvarcheli withstood, through Russian military aid, a siege by the Georgian forces. Since 1995, it has been the center of the newly formed Tkvarcheli District. On 27 September 2008, President Sergei Bagapsh awarded it the honorary title of Hero City.

== Industry ==
Coal mining has been the town's main industry, although now the Soviet mines are closed and coal is quarried only by the Abkhaz-Turkish Tamsaş company using the open pit method. Tamsaş's tax payments account for 75% of the Tkvarcheli district's budget however, the company was criticized for neglecting environmental requirements. Georgia regards all this investment as illegal, in clear violation of the 1996 CIS restrictions and has arrested several vessels, loaded with coal from Tkvarcheli, in its territorial waters, a measure that has reportedly brought Tamsaş to the verge of bankruptcy.

== Demography ==
The town's population was 21,744 in 1989. The three main ethnic groups were Abkhaz (42.3%), Russians (24.5%) and Georgians (23.4%). As a result of the War in Abkhazia the town's industries all but stopped and its population decreased greatly and was between 7,000 and 8,000 in 2004 according to some sources and only 4,800 according to others. At the time of the 2003 census, its population was 4,786. By the time of the 2011 census, it had increased to 5,013. Of these, 66.5% were Abkhaz, 17.4% Georgian, 9.7% Russian, 1.3% Ukrainian, 1.1% Armenian and 0.4% Greek.

== Economy ==
Tkvarcheli's economy has historically been centered around coal mining. However, the town has faced economic decline since the dissolution of the Soviet Union. While coal mining continues to some extent, the industry is no longer as robust, and the local economy has struggled with high unemployment and limited infrastructure development.

Efforts have been made to revive the local economy through investments in small-scale industries and tourism. The town's natural beauty and historical significance have attracted some interest from visitors, though political instability in the region remains a challenge for sustained development.

== Gallery ==
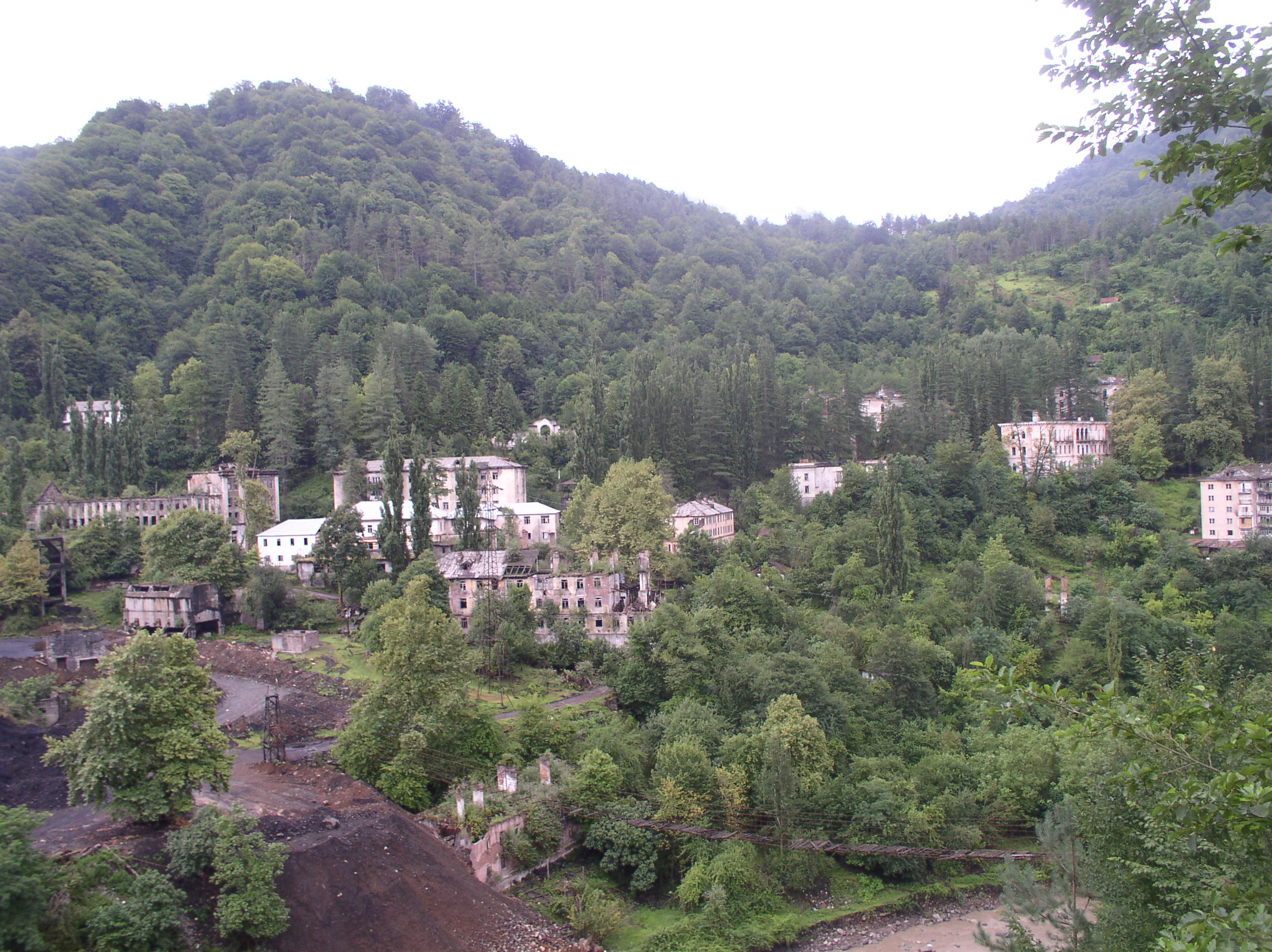
View of the Akarmara ghost town near Tkvarcheli

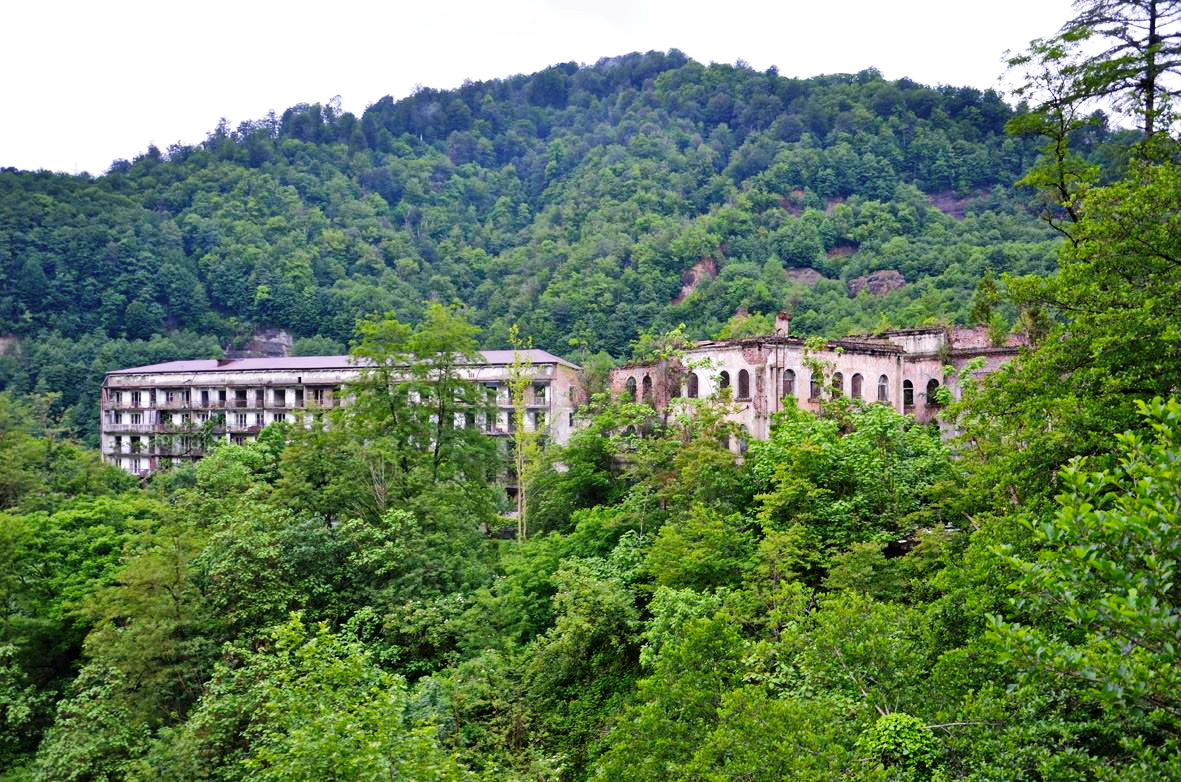
View of an abandoned factory in Akarmara

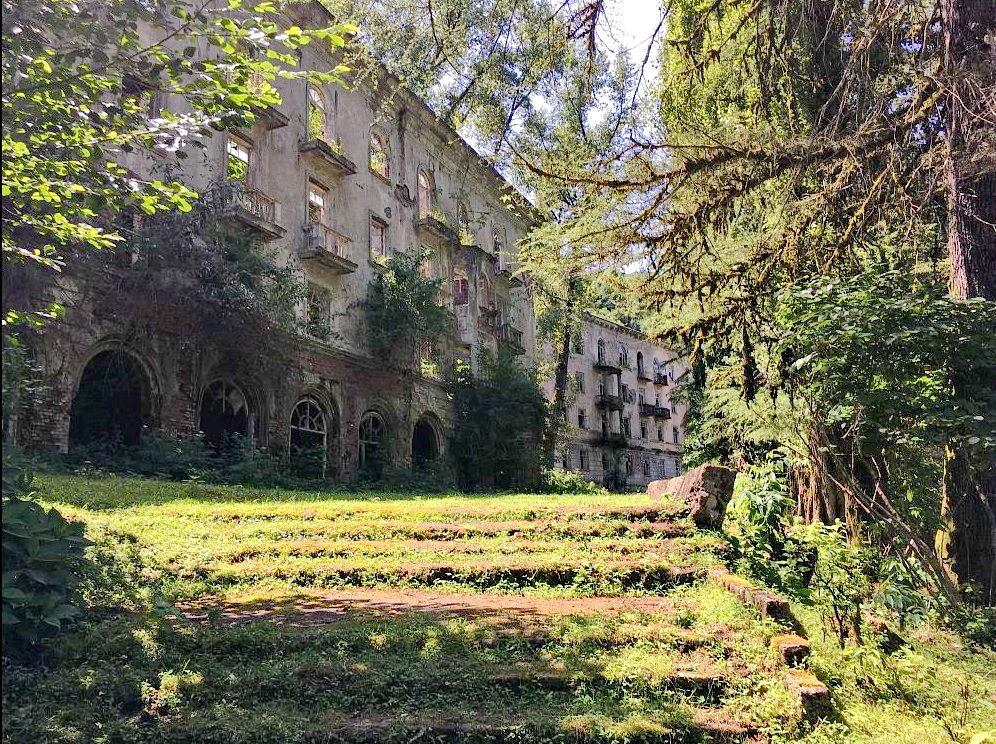
View of abandoned apartments in Akarmara
