= Ochamchire Naval Base =

Coal terminal and a patrol ship facility

- Ochamchire, Abkhazia
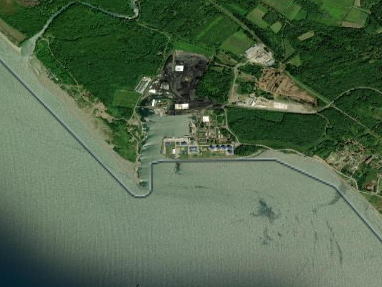
- Satellite imagery of Ochamchire naval base

Site information
- Type: Naval base
- Owner: Disputed: Russia (de facto); Georgia (de jure)
- Operator: Coast Guard of the FSB Border Service
- Controlled by: Russia
- Condition: Operational

Location
- Location within Abkhazia
- Coordinates: 42°44′33″N 41°25′36″E

Site history
- Built: 1933–1935
- Built by: Soviet Union
- In use: 2009–present

Garrison information
- Garrison: Coast Guard of the FSB Border Service
- Occupants: Federal Security Service

The Ochamchire Naval Base (Russian: Очамчира (пункт базирования), Georgian: ოჩამჩირის საზღვაო ბაზა) is a coal terminal and a patrol ship facility, currently serving the Coast Guard of the Russian FSB Border Service. It is located in Ochamchire, within Georgian territory under Russian occupation. Following a bilateral agreement between Russia and partially recognized Republic of Abkhazia, there is growing speculation about a planned expansion of the base, which may soon host vessels of the Russian Navy.

== Geography ==
The base is located in the Ochamchire District, approximately 5 kilometers northwest of Ochamchire (the district capital) and about 40 kilometers from the Abkhazia–Georgia separation line.

== History ==
An artificial harbor was built at the mouth of the Jukhmur River near town of Ochamchire, from which it takes its name. The port has a narrow entrance protected by two breakwaters and can dock up to 10 patrol boats, along with a cargo pier used for loading, refueling, and repairs. A railway branch and crane support operations.

Originally constructed in 1933–1935 as a civilian port, it was repurposed in 1940 for the NKVD Border Security fleet. During World War II, it served as a base for patrol boats and even hid submarines in artificial canals. In the Soviet era, the port could accommodate large vessels, but expansion plans in the late 1980s were scrapped after the USSR collapsed.

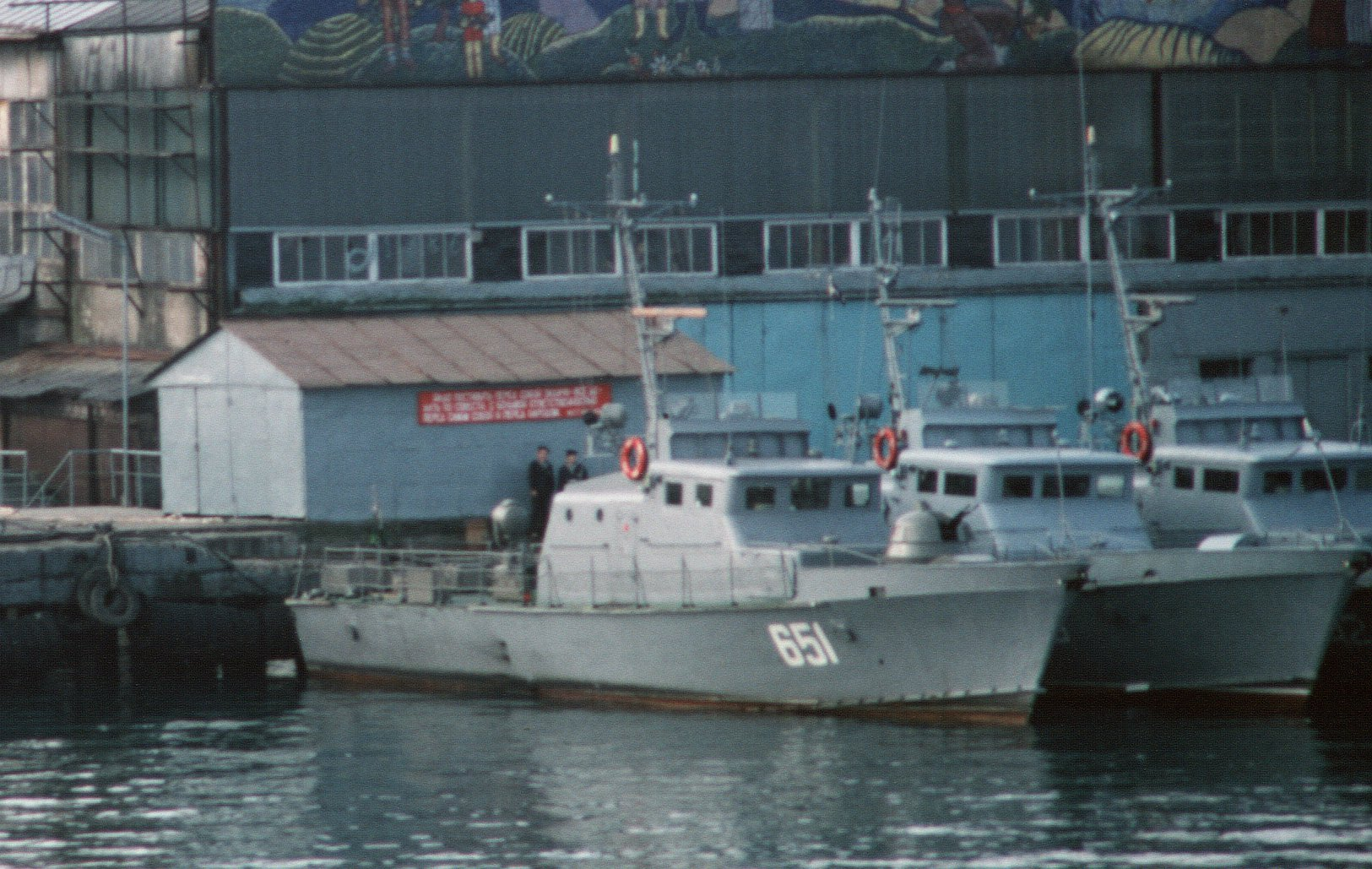
Stationed Project 1400 "Griff" patrol boats in 1980s.

During the 1992–1993 Abkhaz-Georgian war, the port’s forces defended Abkhaz borders and aided evacuations. The Russian brigade relocated to Kaspiysk in 1996, leaving the facility to Abkhaz forces. From 1997–1998, the port was used for repairs and customs operations before being largely abandoned.

By the 2000s, the Abkhaz military shared the harbor with civilian traffic, but years of neglect left it silted and damaged. In 2009, Russia took control, dredging the channel from 3.8 to 9 meters deep, allowing ships up to 10,000 tons. The port became a Russian naval base, equipped for maintenance, supply, and security. By late 2009, modern Russian patrol boats were stationed there for joint border protection, with plans announced in 2010 to increase the fleet to eight vessels.

=== Future enlargement ===
In October 2023, the de facto president of Abkhazia Aslan Bzhania announced that a new Russian naval facility would be established in the port of Ochamchire.

Although Russian authorities did not officially confirm the plans at the time, satellite imagery analyzed by Bellingcat indicates that construction activity at the site has accelerated since early 2024. The emergence of multiple new buildings and perimeter structures suggests a significant expansion of the harbor area. Analysis revealed ongoing development at the site, including the foundations of multiple new buildings, land clearance, and the construction of a large concrete structure approximately 100 by 40 meters in size. Around nine acres of land have been cleared near railway lines leading into the port, indicating preparations for substantial infrastructure expansion.

The development comes in the context of Russia’s ongoing invasion of Ukraine. Since the onset of the full-scale invasion, Russia’s Black Sea Fleet has been repeatedly targeted by Ukrainian drones and missiles. Following a major aerial and maritime assault on Sevastopol in October 2022, much of the fleet was relocated to Novorossiysk. This prompted Russia to further withdraw naval assets from Sevastopol in occupied Crimea. The proposed facility in Ochamchire, located roughly 500 kilometers southeast of Sevastopol Naval Base, would move Russian naval assets even farther from Ukrainian shores, potentially reducing their vulnerability to drone and missile attacks.

At present, the port at Ochamchire has a depth of only 9 meters, making it unsuitable for larger warships. However, it is capable of accommodating smaller vessels used for logistical support and missile deployment. Satellite imagery obtained by the BBC shows that dredging and construction have been underway since 2022, likely aimed at enhancing the port’s capacity to host larger vessels.

In a July 2024 interview with the Russian state news agency TASS, Abkhazian president Badra Gunba claimed that Russia was not constructing a full "military-naval base" in Ochamchire, but rather a "technical support base" for the Black Sea Fleet. He stated that agreements on the project had already been signed and that the facility would strengthen military cooperation between Abkhazia and Russia. However, the distinction between a "technical support base" and a conventional naval base remains unclear. Analysts suggest that Gunba’s remarks may reflect a shift in rhetoric rather than a substantive change in policy or planning.

Ukrainian President Volodymyr Zelenskyy responded to reports of the naval expansion by warning that Ukraine will not refrain from targeting Russian ships stationed in Abkhazia. “We will reach them everywhere,” he declared, signaling that Ukrainian forces would consider such assets legitimate military targets regardless of their location.
