= Ochamchire =

Seaside town in Abkhazia

Ochamchire ოჩამჩირე, Очамчы́ра
- town
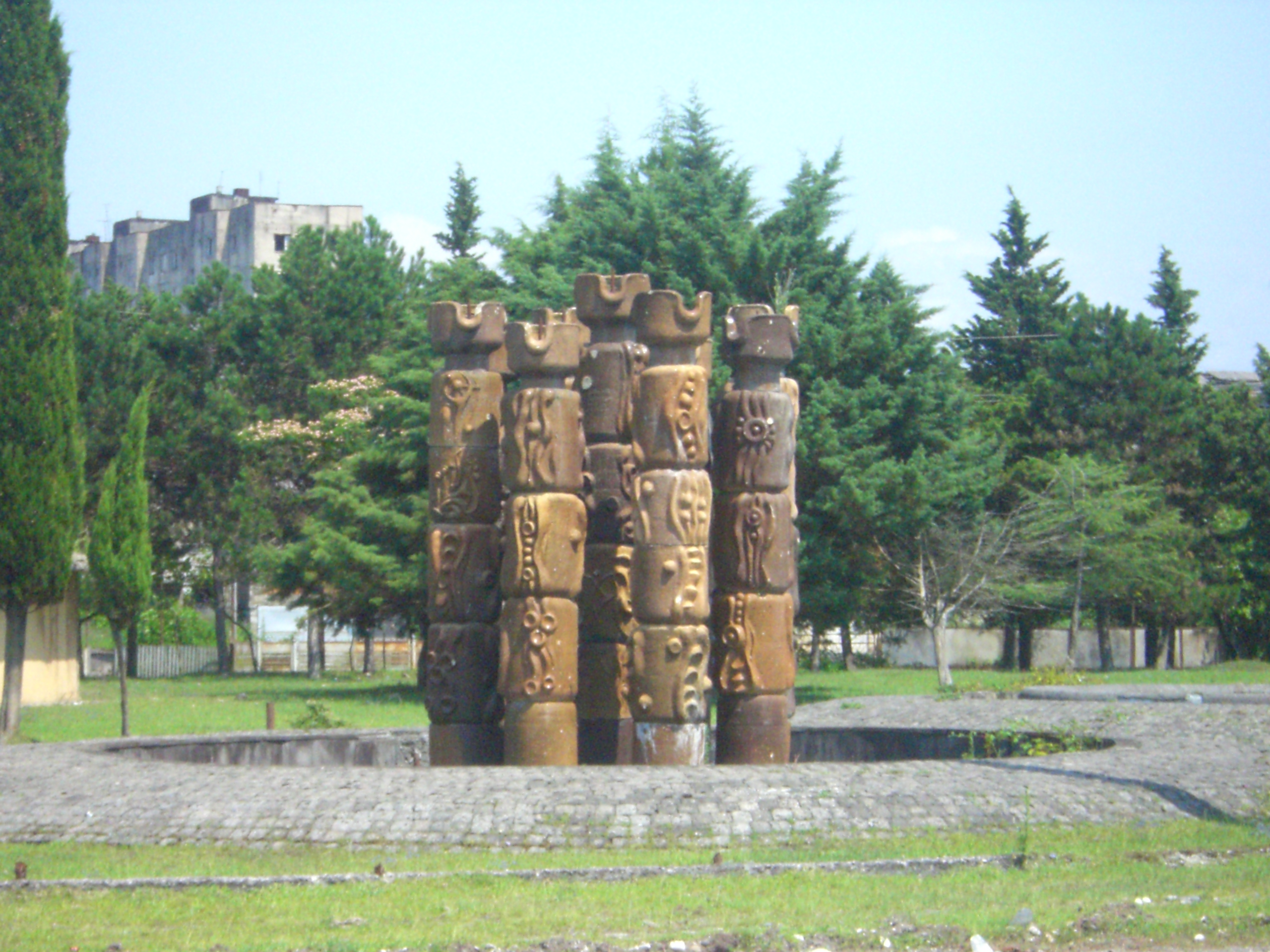
- Fountain in Ochamchire

- Location of Ochamchire within Abkhazia

- Location of Ochamchire in Georgia Ochamchire (Abkhazia)
- Coordinates: 42°43′00″N 41°28′00″E
- Country: Georgia
- Partially recognized independent country: Abkhazia
- District: Ochamchire

Population (2011)
  - Total: 5,280
- Time zone: UTC+3 (MSK)
  - Summer (DST): UTC+4

Ochamchire or Ochamchira (Georgian: ოჩამჩირე, [otʃʰamtʃʰiɾe]; Abkhaz: Очамчыра, Ochamchyra; Russian: Очамчира, Ochamchira) is a seaside city on the Black Sea coast of Abkhazia, Georgia, and a center of an eponymous district.

According to the 1989 Soviet population census, Ochamchire had 20,078 residents. After the Georgian-Abkhaz conflict of 1992–93, Ochamchire experienced a significant population decline due to ethnic cleansing of Georgians. Most of the displaced persons affected by the conflict have yet to return to the city. Ochamchire lies along the left bank of the Ghalidzga River where it enters the sea. The city is located 53 kilometres (33 miles) southeast of the Abkhazian capital of Sokhumi.

== Climate ==
Ochamchire's climate is humid subtropical, with mild winters and hot summers. The average annual temperature is 13.6 degrees Celsius. January's average temperature is 4.5 degrees Celsius while the average temperature in July is 23 degrees Celsius. Average annual precipitation is approximately 1,552 mm (61 in).

== History ==
Ochamchire evolved as a town from a small maritime settlement, which was a scene of fighting between the Russians and Turkish-Abkhaz forces in 1877.

The ancient Greek colony of Gyenos (Greek: Γυένος) is supposed to have been located near Ochamchire, though the identification can't be considered as definitive because of doubts as to the actual location and the very poor preservation of the archaeologic site itself. The archaeological evidence demonstrates the influence of the Greek culture, if not necessarily Greek settlement starting from 6th century BC.

According to Itar Tass, in 2009, Russia began discussing plans to construct a new naval base for its Black Sea Fleet (as of 2009 based at Sevastopol) in Ochamchire. The invasion of Ukraine and the attacks on the Russian fleet in Crimea provided new impetus to those plans in October 2023. After Aslan Bzhania met with Vladimir Putin in Moscow in October 2023, he told the newspaper Isvestiya that a treaty about the establishment of a Russian naval base in Ochamchire had been signed. As the town is notionally in neutral Georgia, if the prospective base were to be built, it would be considered to be relatively safe from Ukrainian attacks.

In January 2024, Russia signed an agreement with Abkhazia to host the Ochamchire Russian naval base. Some Abkhazians believe the agreement is principally a manifestation of political and information war conflict between pro-Russian and more independence-oriented Abkhazians, but have allowed that, at minimum, if the base is built, it would be a vital refueling port facility for the Russian Navy. However, no deepwater port facilities exist around the beaches of Ochamchire as of 2023.

== Notable people ==
The former Georgian Soviet footballer Vitaly Daraselia was from Ochamchire.

== International relations ==
=== Twin towns — Sister cities ===
Ochamchire is twinned with the following cities:

- Kostroma, Russia
- Bender, Transnistria (defacto), Moldova (dejure)

== See also ==
- Ochamchire Municipality
- Ochamchire Naval Base

== Sources ==
- Georgian State (Soviet) Encyclopedia. 1983. Book 7. p. 623.
