= Georgian sea blockade of Abkhazia =

The Georgian sea blockade of Abkhazia has been in force since 2004, when it was ordered to be imposed by Georgian president Mikheil Saakashvili. As a response to the 2008 South Ossetia war, Georgia moved to intensify Abkhazia and South Ossetia's isolation, declaring both entities as Russian-occupied territories outlawing economic activity in the regions without Tbilisi's permission. Several cargo ships in Georgian waters have been detained by the Georgian coast guard in 2009 on the grounds of violating of Georgia's law on occupied territories, which bans economic activities in breakaway Abkhazia and South Ossetia without Georgia's consent.

== Georgian naval raids ==
Twenty-three cargo ships were detained in the Black Sea by the Georgian Navy in 2009. Abkhaz authorities have called the Georgian actions "piracy." In mid-August, Georgia seized a Turkish tanker delivering gasoline and diesel to Abkhazia. The ship was taken into Georgian government ownership, and may later be auctioned by the Georgian ministry of finance. A Georgian court sentenced the captain of the ship to 24 years in prison for smuggling and violating the ban on unauthorized economic activity with Abkhazia.

== Reactions ==
On 2 September 2009, President of Abkhazia Sergei Bagapsh warned that the Abkhazian naval forces will destroy any Georgian ships engaged in future "pirate actions". Georgia's deputy prime minister Temur Yakobashvili shrugged off the Abkhazian threat, saying that Abkhazia has no technical means to destroy ships. "Moreover," Yakobashvili said, "it is not his [Bagapsh's] business. It looks more like a pre-election bluff."

The Georgian Foreign Minister, Grigol Vashadze, said Bagapsh was a criminal and it was up to Georgian law enforcement agencies to respond to his threats. The Georgian authorities said Russia was behind the Abkhaz side's threat.

Andrei Nesterenko, a spokesman of the Russian Foreign Ministry said, on September 3, 2009, further seizure of cargo ships en route to Abkhazia by Georgian coast guard may cause “serious armed incidents” and blamed Georgia for possible escalation. Earlier, Deputy head of Russian Federal Security Service border guard department, Yevgeny Inchin, said on August 28, 2009, that a unit of the Russian border guards in Abkhazia would be dispatched to provide security for ships entering Abkhazia. This statement was denounced by Georgia as a violation of the 1982 United Nations Convention on the Law of the Sea.

European Union Monitoring Mission in Georgia (EUMM) said on September 2, 2009, that it was concerned about the statements by the Georgian, Abkhaz, and Russian sides on the matter and the issue was to be included in the agenda of the meeting under the Incident Prevention and Response Mechanism (IPRM) scheme between the sides planned for September 8 in Gali.
