= Politics of Abkhazia =

Politics in Abkhazia is dominated by its conflict with Georgia. Abkhazia became de facto independent from Georgia after the 1992–1993 war, but its de jure independence has only been recognised by a few other countries. Abkhazia is a presidential representative democratic republic with a multi-party system, wherein the President is both head of state and head of government. Executive power is exercised by the government of the Republic of Abkhazia. Legislative power is vested in both the government and the People's Assembly of Abkhazia.

Georgia maintains an Abkhazian government in exile in Tbilisi.

== Institutions of the Republic of Abkhazia ==
=== Executive branch of the partially recognised Republic of Abkhazia ===
Main office-holders
Office	Name	Party	Since
President	Badra Gunba	Independent	2 April 2025
Prime Minister	Vladimir Delba	Independent	3 April 2025

=== Legislative branch ===
The People's Assembly has 35 members, elected for a five-year term in single seat constituencies.

== Latest elections ==
=== Presidential elections ===
Candidate	Running mate	Party	First round		Second round	
Candidate	Running mate	Party	Votes	%	Votes	%
Badra Gunba	Beslan Bigvava	Independent	45,817	47.76	54,954	55.66
Adgur Ardzinba	Alkhas Djindjal	Abkhaz People's Movement	36,476	38.03	41,708	42.25
Robert Arshba	Daut Agrba	Independent	7,434	7.75		
Oleg Bartsits	Adgur Kakoba	Independent	3,988	4.16		
Adgur Khurkhumal	Tengiz Kutelia	Independent	896	0.93		
Against all			1,313	1.37	2,065	2.09
Total			95,924	100.00	98,727	100.00
Valid votes			95,924	97.17	98,727	98.32
Invalid/blank votes			2,798	2.83	1,687	1.68
Total votes			98,722	100.00	100,414	100.00
Registered voters/turnout			143,960	68.58	143,651	69.90
Source: Central Election Commission

== Government of the Autonomous Republic of Abkhazia ==
The de jure Government of Abkhazia in exile, then the Council of Ministers of Abkhazia, left Abkhazia after the Russian-backed Abkhaz separatist forces and their allies from the Confederation of Mountain Peoples of the Caucasus took control of the region's capital Sukhumi after heavy fighting on 27 September 1993, leading to the mass killings of ethnic Georgians and loyal citizens, in which several members of the Abkhazian government, including its chairman Zhiuli Shartava, were executed by the rebels. The Council of Ministers relocated to Georgia's capital Tbilisi, where it operated as a de jure government of Abkhazia for almost 13 years. During this period, the GAIE was led by Tamaz Nadareishvili, until President of Georgia Mikheil Saakashvili appointed a new chairman, Irakli Alasania, his envoy in the peace talks over Abkhazia.

On 27 July 2006, the Georgian authorities relocated the Government of the Autonomous Republic of Abkhazia to Upper Abkhazia. "This decision means that for the first time since 1993 the government enters into the middle of Abkhazia, of our Abkhazia, to exercise Georgian jurisdiction and the Georgian constitutional order. This is very important fact and very fundamental political event," Saakashvili said in his televised address to the nation.

Malkhaz Akishbaia, a western-educated Abkhaz politician was Chairman of the Government of the Autonomous Republic of Abkhazia from April 2006 to June 2009, when he was succeeded by Giorgi Baramia.

This Government was forced out of Upper Abkhazia during the 2008 South Ossetia War.

=== Executive branch of the Government of the Autonomous Republic of Abkhazia ===
Main office-holders
Office	Name	Party	Since
Chairman of the Supreme Council	Gia Gvazava	Abkhazeti	June 2009
Chairman of Cabinet of Ministers	Giorgi Baramia	Abkhazeti	June 2009
Deputy of Supreme Council	Tamaz Khubua	Abkhazeti	June 2009

=== Council of Ministers of Abkhazia in exile ===
Ethnic Abkhaz and Georgian deputies elected to the Abkhaz Supreme Soviet under the unsuccessful 1991 power-sharing arrangement continue to operate from Tbilisi as the de jure government and parliament-in-exile. They began boycotting the Abkhaz parliament in May 1992, complaining of Abkhaz discrimination, and in June commenced a campaign of civil disobedience while attempting to set up parallel power structures in Sukhumi. In October 1992 elections to the Georgian parliament were conducted in those parts of Abkhazia controlled by the central Government. However, with Abkhazia outside Tbilisi's jurisdiction by the time of the 1995 Georgian parliamentary election, the MPs elected from Abkhazia in 1992 automatically retained their seats in the Georgian parliament. After the separatist victory, the de jure Government represented 300,000 IDPs in Tbilisi. There were two significant political groups of Abkhaz IDPs. In April 1999 Tamaz Nadareishvili, chairman of the government-in-exile and at the outbreak of the war Deputy Chairman of the parliament of the Abkhaz Autonomous Republic, founded the Abkhazia Liberation Party (ALP) to contest the October 1999 Georgian parliamentary elections. Formerly a Communist Party functionary in Abkhazia, he was Deputy Prime Minister of Georgia 1993–95. The ALP was the successor to My Home Abkhazia, a party he founded to contest the 1995 parliamentary election but which failed to gain parliamentary representation. However, the ALP is opposed by the Co-ordinating Council of Refugees from Abkhazia founded in 1996 by Boris Kakubava, an MP in the Abkhazeti faction. The Council was represented by the League of Popular Representatives of Georgia political party. Kakubava strongly opposed Shevardnadze whom he blamed for the loss of Abkhazia.

== Abkhazia today ==
The Abkhaz conflict has not been resolved; a ceasefire agreement was signed on 15 May 1994 and a United Nations peacekeeping force (UNOMIG) was given the task of monitoring the agreement. A separate force from the Commonwealth of Independent States (CIS) was assigned to a peacekeeping mission.

Peace talks have taken place on and off over the last ten years, but have achieved little of significance. Although there have been no major outbreaks of fighting in the meantime, border clashes and armed raids by both sides continue to inflict casualties.

A new constitution was adopted, on 4 November 1994, which declared Abkhaz sovereignty. Parliamentary elections were held on 23 November 1996, but these were not recognised by the Georgian government or the international community, as the elections were held after ethnic cleansing when majority of pre-war population had fled Abkhazia. The CIS imposed economic sanctions in January 1996 and the region is officially blockaded by Georgia.

The de facto authorities organised a referendum on 3 October 1999 which approved the current constitution though more than half of the pre-war population expelled from Abkhazia did not take part in voting.

=== 2004 elections ===
On 3 October 2004 presidential elections were held in Abkhazia. In the elections, Russia supported Raul Khajimba, the prime-minister backed by seriously ailing outgoing separatist President Vladislav Ardzinba. Posters of Russia's President Vladimir Putin together with Khajimba, who like Putin had worked as a KGB official, were everywhere in Sukhumi. Deputies of Russia's parliament and Russian singers, led by Joseph Kobzon, both a deputy and a popular songster, came to Abkhazia campaigning for Khajimba.

Still, on 12 October Abkhazia's Supreme Court, after a series of contradictory decisions by the Electoral Committee, recognised that the new president would be a businessman Sergei Bagapsh, accused by his rival's supporters of being pro-Georgian, although Georgia does not recognise any separatist candidates or even the elections. Abkhazia's outgoing President Ardzinba claimed the decision was illegal and made under pressure from supporters of Bagapsh. The decision was cancelled by the Supreme Court the night of the same day. When supporters of Raul Khajimba seized the building of the Supreme Court and destroyed the protocols from local electoral constituencies new elections were prescribed.

Soon the Supreme Court cancelled the later decision, and again named Bagapsh the new president. His supporters captured a local TV station, while Raul Khajimba's supporters took control over the parliament's building. Outgoing president Ardzinba replaced Raul Khajimba as a prime-minister with Nodar Khashba, who, before this appointment served in the Ministry for Extraordinary Situations.

On 5 December the presidential candidates Sergei Bagapsh and Raul Khadjimba agreed to hold new elections. In these elections they would run on a joint ticket, with Khadjimba as vice presidential candidate.

=== Politics after the recognition ===
After Russia recognised Abkhazian independence the Abkhazian president Sergei Bagapsh signed a series of controversial deals giving Russia control over the border with Georgia proper, the Abkhazian railway network and airport, the right to build long term military bases as well as rights to search for oil off its coast. He also called for the legalisation of the sale of real estate to non-citizens.

These policies were met with growing alarm by opposition parties and war veteran groups. Amid growing tension a meeting on 20 May 2009 of six political parties and war veteran movements held a press conference in Sukhumi to express their concern at the president's imputed plans to "hand over chunks of Abkhazia's national heritage to foreign commercial structures for a long time period." They described relations with Russia as "based on trust and mutual respect" before adding that the Abkhaz leadership's "hasty and thoughtless decisions" risked fuelling anti-Russian sentiment and domestic political tensions in the run-up to the presidential ballot. And they stressed, "our state must retain control over our strategic infrastructure."

The Vice President Raul Khadjimba (once an ally of Russia against Sergey Bagapsh) resigned on 28 May 2009, saying he agreed with the criticism the opposition had made. Subsequently, a conference of opposition parties in July 2009 nominated Raul Khadjimba as their candidate in the Abkhazian presidential election, 2009 scheduled for December of the same year.

== Abkhazia's future ==
Abkhazian leaders have made alternating demands in recent years. At times, they have insisted on full independence, and at other times, they have requested associate membership in the Russian Federation. However, the Russian government has inconsistently responded to the latter proposal, fearing the negative effect of such an action on its relations with Georgia. On 28 November 2003, Russian MP Vladimir Zhirinovsky brought forth such a resolution in the State Duma, but saw it rejected. Nonetheless, most citizens of Abkhazia now possess Russian citizenship, and Abkhazians do not require a visa. In April 2023, Russia threatened to annex Abkhazia, a move which was resolutely opposed by de facto Abkhazian authorities.

The Organization for Security and Co-operation in Europe, European Union and United Nations have continued to insist that Abkhazia must remain part of Georgia, and that at the very least, the many Georgian refugees who fled after the 1992–1993 war must be allowed to return, before any acceptable vote on independence can be held.

The Georgian government has continued to insist on Abkhazia's reunification with Georgia, but has differed in its suggestions of means to achieve this, particularly under the government of former President Mikhail Saakashvili.

The Georgian government has, at times, suggested that they may attempt to resolve the conflict by military means. After the 2004 removal of Ajarian leader Aslan Abashidze from office after large public protests, Saakashvili suggested that Abkhazia and fellow separatist entity South Ossetia could be reintegrated in the same manner. However, over the following months, he distanced himself from this idea.

Saakashvili also attempted to portray the Abkhaz dispute as being between Georgia and Russia, owing to the latter's support of the separatists, with the separatist government being portrayed as little more than a Russian puppet. To this end, they pushed for either the complete removal of, or major changes to the mandate of the Russian peacekeepers, and the removal of Russian military bases from Abkhaz territory. In 2003, they succeeded in achieving the latter demand, with Russia removing its bases, leaving only its peacekeeping force.

Both the Abkhaz de facto separatist government and separatist opposition parties (Amtsakhara) resolutely oppose reunification with Georgia under any circumstances.
