= Timeline of the War in Abkhazia (1992–1993) =

The War in Abkhazia from 1992 to 1993 was waged chiefly between Georgian government forces on one side, Russian military forces on other side supporting separatist forces demanding independence of Abkhazia from Georgia. http://www.historyorb.com/russia/georgia.php Ethnic Georgians, who lived in Abkhazia fought largely on the side of Georgian government forces. Ethnic Armenians and Russians within Abkhazia's population, largely supported Abkhazians and many fought on their side. The separatists were supported by thousands of the North Caucasus and Cossack militants and by the Russian Federation forces stationed in and near Abkhazia.

Handling of this conflict was aggravated by the civil strife in Georgia proper between the supporters of the ousted Georgian president, Zviad Gamsakhurdia and the post-coup government headed by Eduard Shevardnadze, as well as the Georgian-Ossetian conflict.

== 1992 ==
=== August ===
==== 14 ====
Police forces had been sent to Abkhazia to defend communication means. The Abkhazian government was informed about this operation. The Sukhumi Battalion of Soso Akhalaia (former officer of the Sukhumi Police Office) that returned from the Tskhinvali region led the police. A Tbilisi police unit had followed the battalion led by David Zeikidze.

The first attack took place in Ochamchire, near the village of Okhurei where the Abkhaz militia fired upon the police escort.

The next attack in Agudzera destroyed one Georgian armored troop carrier.

Another attack had been carried out near the village of Machara. One Georgian had been wounded and one Abkhaz boevik, who was sitting on the roof of a building shooting at the moving column, was killed.

The ambushed Abkhaz boeviks blew up one Georgian armored troop carrier. For some reason, reporters from Russian TV immediately showed up and reported that Georgian troops entered Abkhazia with tanks and occupied Sukhumi.

To avoid further bloodshed, Georgian units moved up to the city suburb.

The separatists called for a mobilization (Sergei Shamba addressed the Abkhaz population, calling them to report to certain places, which were defined in advance). The Presidium of the Supreme Council of Abkhazia, more accurately Vladislav Ardzinba, decided the further developments.

Armed Abkhaz separatists took control of strategic points in the city.

==== 15 ====
A small Georgian military unit had been dispatched to Gagra from the coast.

T. Sigua and J. Ioseliani arrived in Sukhumi for negotiations. It was decided to hold the negotiations in the Sukhumi Governmental Summer Residence, so-called Joseph Stalin's Dacha, but Sergei Bagapsh asked to change the place. The negotiators from the Georgian side were: T. Sigua, Jaba Ioseliani (members of the State Council), Tamaz Nadareishvili (Deputy Chairman of the Supreme Council of Abkhazia), V. Kolbaia (Deputy), N. Meskhia (Deputy), A. Ioseliani (Head of the Security Service of Abkhazia); from the Abkhazian side: S. Bagapsh (First Deputy Chairman of the Council of Ministers of Abkhazia), Z. Labakhua (Deputy Chairman of the Council of Ministers of Abkhazia, A. Ankvab (Deputy, Ministry of Interior), Z. Achba, S. Shamba, D. Pilia (Deputies). T. Sigua informed them that police forces had entered Abkhazia with the aim to defend communication systems, which was negotiated with Ardzinba. This information surprised the Abkhazian side. Sigua requested a meeting with Ardzinba, but he refused and avoided the possibility of dialogue. Z. Labakhua offered to control the railroads and other communication means with a group of 200 Georgians and 200 Abkhazians from the Psou River down to the Samegrelo Region. The agreement was elaborated but not signed. Sergei Bagapsh requested time to leave Sukhumi. The negotiation ended. The Abkhaz again tried to extend the time.

==== 17 ====
The Abkhazians placed pickets along the Bzibi highway.

A few hours later Georgians posted pickets near the village of Kolkhida.

Hostages were exchanged in Kolkhida.

Negotiating with the Georgians, the Head of the Gagra Administration announced an evacuation of holidaymakers.

==== 18 ====
The Government of Vladislav Ardzinba left Sukhumi taking all types of road vehicles and the medicines and narcotics from the main drug warehouse.

Well-organized snipers from the building rooftops, which resulted in casualties resisted the Georgian formations. Later Georgians made a stand at the Gumista River. They certainly could move ahead as Abkhazians escaped in panic in the direction of Gudauta. Georgian journalist Alexander Berulava, who had been taken hostage by the Abkhazian, was delivered from Gudauta to Gagra.

The Ministry of Defense, due to increasing criminal activity in Sukhumi, declared an emergency situation and curfew from August 18 until September 18. General G. Gulua was appointed Commandant.

The Caucasus Mountain Peoples’ Congress decides to dispatch groups of volunteer fighters to Abkhazia.

==== 19 ====
Georgian troops took control over the city of Gagra. Abkhazians left the city.

B. Pirtskheliani from the "Mkhedrioni" formation became Commandant of Gagra. Member of the Chavchavadze Society, J. Lataria, was his deputy.

The members of the evacuation Commission arrived in Gagra.

==== 20 ====
The leaders of the Northern Caucasian Republics, Rostov, Stavropol and Krasnodar oblasts held an anti-Georgian meeting in Armavir. In an appeal to Yeltsin they expressed concern about Russia's "late" reaction to the developments in Abkhazia.

Medicines delivered from Tbilisi were delivered to the Gudauta Regional Hospital (i.e. to the Abkhazian side).

15000 Russian holidaymakers were evacuated from Abkhazia – announced the Georgian Deputy Minister of Health Avtandil Jorbenadze.

==== 22 ====
Abkhaz formations, together with confederants, crossed the Gumista River, but Georgian troops pushed them back.

Georgian Commander in Chief G. Karkarashvili, giving a rash estimation to the military operations in Abkhazia made a speech on television.

==== 24 ====
Abkhazian fighters detained Georgian A. Chkheidze from Eshera and took him to Gudauta, where Chkheidze with other three Georgians were mistreated.

==== 26 ====
Armed Chechens mistreated V. Maliuk from Eshera, just because he expressed his sympathy to Georgians. They also raped Georgian teenager L.Ts-ia. In the village of Orjonikidze Abkhazians killed Georgian couple N. and R. Lobzhanidze.

==== 30 ====
A group of Armenian parliamentarians, led by Seiran Bagdasarian, member of the "Dashnaktsuitun" arrived in Sukhumi from Tbilisi. On Sunday they met Tamaz Nadareishvili and other Georgian Deputies. They visited Armenian villages controlled by Georgians and went to meet Ardzinba. They wanted to learn about security issues of the Armenian population in Abkhazia.

==== 31 ====
The Georgian military group moved to Kvemo Eshera but met the resistance of the Russian military unit located in that area. The group took control over oil storage and the mill–factory.

The office of the Red Cross of Sochi city gave 50 000 roubles worth of medicines to Gudauta hospital. Northern Caucasians sent 350 tons of humanitarian cargo to Abkhazia. 57 refugees from Abkhazia got 42 000 roubles compensation in Sochi.

G. Lominade had been approved as chairman of an ad hoc commission to exercise executive functions.

Humanitarian and other facilitator commissions were created. G. Nachkebia and E. Astemirova were in charge of the commission.

=== September ===
==== 1 ====
Respecting St. Virgin's Day, the leadership of the Sukhumi garrison released 17 Abkhazian hostages.

Abkhazian TV broadcast had been renewed. Vakhtang Kholbaia was in charge to organize the TV broadcasting.

Central Georgian TV transmissions reached over the whole of Abkhazia; Abkhazian broadcast only for the Gudauta region and part of the Gagra zone.

According to the figures of Ministry of Health of Abkhazia, since the beginning of the war 130 people of different nationalities had been killed and 510 wounded.

==== 3 ====
In Moscow with the mediation and [facilitation of Russia, Boris Yeltsin and Eduard Shevardnadze had signed a ceasefire document where a separation of forces was agreed. The document defined Abkhazians and Georgians in Abkhazia as opposing sides, and that is why Vladislav Ardzinba and Tamaz Nadareishvili also signed the document.

==== 5 ====
The Georgian side carried out the implementation of the agreement and they left the positions. The local population remained defenseless. Abkhaz formations violated the ceasefire and held the new positions, annihilating Georgian dwellers of the village of Kvemo Eshera.

==== 16 ====
The separatists adopted a resolution "On Military Aggression of the Georgian State Council against Abkhazia" and "The genocide of the Abkhaz people".

==== 22 ====
The ad hoc Commission on stabilization of the situation in Abkhazia created branch offices in the cities and villages providing assistance to displaced people.

==== 24 ====
Russian law-enforcement bodies detained the President of the Mountain Peoples’ Confederation M. Shanibov. The federation summoned the Congress.

==== 24–25 ====
Sergey Baburin (Russian Deputy) initiated a closed session of the Supreme Council of the Russian Federation. They discussed the Northern Caucasian consequences resulting from the conflict in Abkhazia. The session adopted a resolution on the "Social-Political situation in North Caucasia" that the Georgian Government identified as interference in Georgia's internal affairs.

==== 27 ====
The president of the Mountain Peoples’ confederation Musa Shanibov was released.

The leaders of the Abkhaz separatists declared a suspension of the withdrawal of military formations of the Mountain Peoples’ confederation.

==== 30 ====
Georgian Governmental forces ousted Gamsakhurdia's military formations from Senaki.

==== 10–30 ====
According to the Moscow agreement, the Georgian side withdrew [military forces from the Gagra zone. Only local volunteers remained in the city.

=== October ===
==== 1 ====
Gamsakhurdia's supporters' military formations seized the town Khobi.

==== 2–3 ====
Abkhaz, Russian and North Caucasian joint troops attacked Gagra using the newest military techniques, tanks and aviation. Russian navy blocked the seawater area. The military vessels: SKP "Bezukoriznenniy", "KIL-25", "BTH-38", "BM-66", "Golovin", Landing 345, aviation 529 (SU-25, SU-27, MI-8) and anti-aircraft 643 regiments commended by the first deputy Minister of Defense of Russian Federation G. Kolesnikov took part in the occupation of Gagra zone. Russian tanker "Don" delivered to Gudauta 420 tons of fuel.

==== 3 ====
With the active participation of Musa Shanibov, an Extraordinary Congress of the Mountain Peoples’ confederation had been called.

The organization got a new name – Caucasus Peoples’ Confederation. Assembly] decided to support the separatists in Abkhazia and involve Cossacks in military operations.

==== 3–4 ====
Abkhazs and formations of Confederation] attacked the position Dvurechia on the Gumista River to the direction of the villages Kamani and Shroma. Georgians repelled attack and the fighters of the Third Brigade of Georgian National Guard destroyed the technique and overwhelmed the enemy.

==== 5 ====
Russian military forces brought down Georgian helicopter MI-8.

==== 11 ====
Georgia held the first post-communist parliamentary elections. Gagra, Gudauta and Tkvarcheli regions were under the control of separatists; Gamsakhurdia's supporters boycotted the elections in Gali. The rest of Abkhazian regions participated in the election.

==== 13 ====
Georgian fighter SU-25 had been brought down.

==== 18 ====
The President of Caucasus Peoples’ Confederation, Musa Shanibov arrived in Gudauta and established Strategic Headquarter of the Confederation.

==== 31 ====
L. Kobalia, together with other supporters of ex-President Gamsakhurdia arrived in Sukhumi to play the role of mediator in the negotiations with Abkhaz side.

=== November ===
==== 5 ====
L. Kobalia arrived in Gudauta and offered the role of mediator together with the representatives of Dzhokhar Dudayev.

At 18.00 Russian SU-25 shelled the Georgian battalion at the Gumista River.

==== 15 ====
At 7 p.m. aviation shelled Georgian military formations and police detachment at the Gumista River.

==== 18 ====
Aviation bombed the residential area Kelasuri that caused civilian casualties.

==== 20–29 ====
Some Russian military formations left Sukhumi following a ceasefire agreement.

==== 24 ====
The Cabinet of Ministers of Abkhazia had been established chaired by Tamaz Nadareishvili. The faction "Democratic Abkhazia" and ad hoc Commission on Conflict Settlement suspended activities.

==== 29–30 ====
Abkhaz, Armenian and North Caucasian formations assaulted and captured the biggest Georgian village Kochara of Ochamchire region and completely devastated the area.

=== November ===
In the village Chlow of Ochamchire region Russians opened training center for Abkhaz boeviks, teaching them military operations and technique usage.

In the village Rekha of Ochamchire region Abkhazs formed the battalion of local residents of 150 people commanded by Slavik Kishmaria.

Ethnic Abkhazians of Ochamchire region established battalion "Zigzag" (220 people).

=== December ===
==== 1 ====
The Parliament of Georgia pronounced martial law in Sukhumi and Ochamchire region and approved the Standing Order of the ad hoc Commission on Abkhazia's issue. The minister of economy, Beslan Kobakhia, arrived in Sukhumi to have a negotiation with G. Khaindrava. Kobakhia declared that Ardzinba would resign if Shevardnadze would do the same. He did not approve the facts of vandalism in Gagra and noted that Abkhazia officially never declared the aim to secede from Georgia.

Abkhaz part of the Supreme Council had a session in Gudauta where they decided to remove immunity of the Georgian Deputies T. Nadareishvili, V. Kholbaia, O. Zukhbaia and, E. Gvazava. The session changed the name of Sukhumi to "Sukhum" and Tkvarcheli to "Tkvarchal".

==== 2 ====
Russian aviation bombarded Sukhumi.

==== 5 ====
Two SU-25 conducted an air attack on the Georgian strongholds at Gumista River.

==== 6 ====
A Russian helicopter with weapons and mercenaries on board crashed.

==== 7 ====
During fighting in the village Tskhenistskali of Ochamchire region Georgian battalion "Tbilisi" (Commander A. Kvashilava) lost 10 fighters.

==== 27 ====
To prevent permanent attacks along the motor roads Georgian army took positions to Tkvarcheli direction till the village Akvaska.

=== December ===
Russian-Abkhaz joint council and migratory service of Russia takes responsibility on resettlements of those Russian military officers that left East Europe and former Soviet republics. The first deputy of the Council of Ministers of Abkhazia Sergei Bagapsh chairs the commission.

== 1993 ==
=== January ===
==== 2 ====
At 13.00 Abkhaz fighters attacked the Georgian position on Gumista River. One Georgian infantryman was wounded. From grenade launcher "Grad" Abkhazs shelled Sukhumi with 10 missiles causing civilian casualties.

=== 3 ===
Near the Tskhenistskali River Georgians repulsed an attack. 15 Abkhazian fighters perished and 4 Georgians were wounded. 8

==== 4–5 ====
Abkhazians conducted attack at Gumista River. Four Georgian fighters were perished and 8 wounded. Abkhazian side lost 90 fighters and 4 tanks.

==== 5 ====
At about 20.00 o’clock Abkhaz boeviks flying with hang glider over Sukhumi airport bombed residential area; No casualties. 10

==== 7 ====
Abkhazs and Georgians fought in the village Kindghi of Ochamchire region. Abkhaz formations retreated.

At 4 in the morning in the suburb of Ochamchire Abkhaz diversionary group blew up high voltage electric pylon resulting in a blackout in Sukhumi, Sukhumi region and Gulripshi. 11

==== 11 ====
At the border of Gali and Ochamchire regions, at 7 o’clock in the morning Georgian military units surrounded diversionary group of 14 Abkhaz fighters. Three Abkhaz fighters had been killed and the rest were taken hostage. 12

==== 12 ====
The Parliament of Georgia approved the Regulations of Gagra Events’ Investigation commission. 13

==== 13 ====
An attack took place near the village Pokveshi of Ochamchire region. Abkhaz side lost two fighters and 10 were wounded. 14

==== 15 ====
Near the village of Kutoli in Ochamchire region the fighting was ended with 4 Georgians and 15 Abkhazian casualties. During this fighting Abkhazs brought down a Georgian military helicopter. 15

==== 27 ====
Near the village of Tskhenistskali in Ochamchire region along Akvaska River two Georgians from reconnaissance group of battalion #24 blew up an electronic check-board and four weapon emplacements.

=== February ===
==== 4 ====
The Georgian Parliament adopted the resolution "Russian –Georgian negotiations and the Measures of Conflict Resolution in Abkhazia" authorizing the Head of State and the Cabinet of Ministers to conduct negotiations. 16

==== 10 ====
Commander–in chief of the Georgian Armed Forces Eduard Shevardnadze issued an order "Measures on defense of Sukhumi and Ochamchire Regions" that states: "Military formations of different countries are concentrating in Gudauta and Gumista area. We have information that those forces have serious aim to seize Sukhumi and bring the chaos and turmoil in entire Georgia."

The statement of the Head of State had appointed Guram Gabiskiria Mayor of Sukhumi.

==== 15 ====
Fighting between government military forces and the supporters of ex-President Gamsakhurdia took place in Senaki and Zugdidi.

==== 24 ====
Georgian Parliament made a declaration blaming Russia in aggression against Georgia demanding withdrawal of Russian military forces from the territory of Abkhazia. 17

==== 25 ====
Georgian Parliament adopted resolution "On Military Units of Russia dislocated on the territory of Abkhazia" that states: "to consider inadmissible further presence of Russian forces on the territory of Abkhazia"; 2. To be asked the Chairman of the Parliament of Georgia to negotiate with the President of Russia the withdrawal of Russian military units from the conflict zone". 18

=== March ===
==== 4 ====
The Head of State Eduard Shevardnadze arrived in Sukhumi and led Sukhumi defense operations.

Parliament of Georgia announced the martial law in Gali and Gulripshi regions. 19

==== 10 ====
About 20 Abkhazians and 9 Georgians perished during the fight near village Labra of Ochamchire region.

==== 11 ====
Georgian parliament adopted a resolution on the timetable of Russian military force withdrawal (not later than 1995). 21

==== 12 ====
At 19.00 o’clock Russian SU-25 shelled civilians in the village Tsagera of Ochamchire region with missiles "Nursi". 2 Georgians were killed and 9 wounded (among them 5 minors).

==== 13 ====
At 19.00 and 23.00 hours Russian SU-25 conducted reconnaissance flight and bombed Georgian position at the Gumista River. The buildings had been destroyed. No casualties.

==== 14 ====
At 6 and 9 o’clock in the morning Abkhazs attacked Georgian positions at the Gumista River. In the afternoon SU-25 flew over Shroma.

At 21.00 hours Abkhazs assaulted Sukhumi with all types of weapon at their disposal. 20 buildings had been destroyed, 2 citizens killed and 12 wounded (among them 2 minors).

==== 16 ====
At 2 o’clock in the morning Abkhaz side started artillery bombardments to Georgian positions at the Gumista River and Sukhumi. Later several SU-25 had been shelling Sukhumi till the morning. In early morning enemy conducted the storm along the whole front-line. Russian special detachment led the operation followed with Abkhaz fighters and mercenaries. They crossed the Gumista River and took beachhead "Uchkhoz" and part of Achadara direction. Small group of Georgian fighters reinforced position by 5 o’clock. Georgians re-attacked and restored the front-line. Russian military aircraft bombed Sukhumi during the night causing destruction and casualties. At 2 o’clock in the morning enemy tried to cross the river again but failed.

Sukhumi streets became the targets of intensive bombardment, leading to casualties and destruction.

==== 17 ====
Parliament of Georgia sent the appeal to the United Nations, European Parliament, world Parliaments, Supreme Council of the Russian Federation. Declaration defined Russia's decisive role in March 16 assault. Parliament demanded withdrawal of Russian forces from the territory of Abkhazia. 22

Council of Deputies of Moscow appeals to the Supreme Council of Russia demanding sanctions against Georgia.

At 13.00 hours Georgian forces fired and sank warship that appeared near Sukhumi lighthouse.

At 3 o’clock in the morning Abkhaz side tried again crossing Gumista River. Georgian artillery repelled the attack.

==== 18 ====
At 17.00 hours Georgian artillery destroyed 4 trucks of enemy heading forward to Eshera direction.

==== 18–31 ====
Georgians offered the Abkhaz side a ceasefire to take and bury their deceased from Gumista battlefield. Instead they used Georgians’ good will to fortify their positions. Georgian side did not react.

==== 19 ====
At 5 o’clock in the morning a SU-27 was shot down. The pilot, Major V. Shipko perished.

==== 22 ====
Head of State of Georgia approved the Board of the council of Ministers of Abkhazia (Tamaz Nadareishvili – chairman, L. Marshania, R. Sichinava, V. Berulava, A. Gasviani, G. Adamia, G. Gabiskiria, J. Betashvili, D. Gulua, P. Datuashvili, I. Keshelava).

==== 25 ====
Near the village Beslakhuba of Ochamchire region diversionary group tried to break through Georgian positions. Attack had been repelled. 6 Georgian fighters – D. Sharangia, I. Kantaria, Z. Latsuzbaia, G. Titberidze, R. Zaria and K. Tsatava perished. 23

=== April ===
==== 1 ====
Georgian Parliament adopted resolution that for the first time blamed Russia for political facilitation of ethnic cleansing and genocide against Georgians. Relevant appeal had been sent to United Nations and other international organizations that defined Russia's behavior as aggression against Georgia and a violation of its independence and territorial integrity. "Encouraged by Russian military forces, the separatists take control over the part of Georgian territory – Abkhazia, conducting ethnic cleansing that takes a character of genocide of Georgians and other nationalities in the territory".

==== 6–9 ====
Negotiations between Georgian (T. Kitovani, J. Ioseliani) and Russian (P. Grachev, B. Pastukhov) sides were held. They discussed the withdrawal of Russian military forces from the territory of Georgia till 1995.

==== 22 ====
Georgian Parliament called Abkhaz People to ceasefire and reconciliation. 26

==== 26 ====
Shevardnadze issued a statement "On establishment of bilateral commission to elaborate timetable for the withdrawal of Russian military forces from the territory of Georgia". Major-General T. Reout had been informed.

Georgian aircraft for the first and last time bombed Gudauta.

==== 27 ====
Georgian Parliament adopted resolution "On withdrawal of Russian military units from the conflict zone in Abkhazia" that states: "Considering active participation of Russian military forces in conflict in Abkhazia, Supreme Council of Russian Federation adopted several resolutions violating Georgia's sovereignty as well as September 3, 1992 Moscow Agreement, (…) On the territories under the control of Russian forces and separatists, the ethnic cleansing and genocide is under way. Parliament of Georgia recognizes the tragic developments as Russia's attempt to annex the part of the territory of Georgia."

==== 28 ====
Head of State confers the rank of major general upon Tamaz Nadareishvili.

==== 29 ====
Head of State issues an order to establish Defense Council of Abkhazia chaired by Tamaz Nadareishvili.

Shevardnadze and Chairman of the Cabinet of Ministers T. Sigua arrived in Sukhumi.

==== 30 ====
Russian MI-8 helicopter delivered huge amount of "guided missiles" to Tkvarcheli.

=== May ===
==== 1 ====
Two SU-25 of Georgian airforce tried to stifle artillery weapon emplacements that bombed a Sukhumi residential area. Russian military airplane (SU-27) brought down one of them. The pilot R. Naroushvili had time to eject the plane. The pilot of another plane witnessed that Russian fighter, conducting the flight at a height of 2.7 thousand meters, took off from Bombora airport of Gudauta. 28

Russian military helicopters delivered "surface to surface" missiles and submachine guns to Tkvarcheli.

==== 5–6 ====
The Deputy Minister of Foreign Affairs of Russia B. Pastukhov, and one of the separatist leaders S. Jinjolia, had a confidential meeting in Adyghe capital Mayikop.

==== 6 ====
Giorgi Karkarashvili was appointed Minister of Defense of Georgia.

==== 7 ====
Jaba Ioseliani and Tengiz Kitovani were awarded Vakhtang Gorgasali First Degree decorations.

==== 10 ====
By the information of Reconnaissance group of Georgian military forces Abkhaz side increased number of Boeviks and weapons delivering them from North Caucasia and other regions of Russia. The aircraft systematically conducted flights between Gudauta-Tkvarcheli and Teberda-Tkvarcheli. For the May the formation consisted about 3000–3300 boeviks. In Abkhazian Atara they had 120–150 infantrymen, in Kutoli – 150–160, in Jgerdashi – 200, in Labra-80, in Gvadashi- 150–170, in Chlow – 110, in Mokvi – 460, in Merkula – 300, in Beslakhuba – 200–300, in Pokveshi – 130–150, in Reka – 180, in Bedia – 250–300, in Tkvarcheli – 500. They possessed: submachine guns – 3000, machine- guns – 69, launchers (РПГ) – 135, mortar – 23, wide-caliber anti-aircraft settings (ЗСУ) – 6, anti-aircraft missiles (Стрела) – 28, missiles (НУРС) – 7, jet anti-aircraft settings (Град) – 2, cannons – 4, grenade launchers (АГС) – 3, sharpshooter rifles (СВД) – 12, armored vehicles (БМП) – 4, armored troop carriers – 5, guided missiles (ПТУ-РС) – 5. Separatists also had well-organized communication. One radio radar worked in Tkvarcheli.

==== 14 ====
Shevardnadze and Boris Yeltsin signed a joint communiqué in Moscow that considered bilateral relations and conflict settlement in Abkhazia. The sides agreed to elaborate documents for high level meeting respecting September 3, 1992 Moscow meeting final document format.

B. Pastukhov had been appointed as a special representative of the president of Russia in conflict zone.

==== 20 ====
Special envoy of the UN Secretary General E. Bruner arrived in Sukhumi.

Georgian fighters shot at a Russian military helicopter that flew from Klukhori. The damaged helicopter left Georgian territory.

==== 21 ====
7–8 military transport helicopters with 10 tons of carrying capacity conducted several flights in the direction of Tkvarcheli.

==== 24 ====
The teachers and schoolchildren of the village Gudava had a meeting with the fighters of battalion #245.

==== 26 ====
Georgian fighters brought down Russian military helicopter MI-6 near the village Sakeni of Ochamchire region that carried weapons from Gudauta to Tkvarcheli. (L. Chubrov, E. Kasimov, A. Saveliyev, V. Tsariov and E. Fiodorov perished).

==== 27 ====
Abkhaz L. Zarandia sent from Moscow 120 well-trained mercenaries. They arrived in Tkvarcheli by helicopters and were deployed to Tamishi, Chlow and Tkvarcheli. Besides, the helicopters brought about 200 infantrymen. 100 submachine guns had been delivered from Turkey.

=== June ===
==== 9–10 ====
Russian helicopters made 6 flights landing in the village Tkhina of Ochamchire region delivering boeviks and weapons.

==== 14 ====
Separatists intensified delivery of military equipment to Ochamchire-Tkvarcheli direction. Only this day AN-2 airplane carried out 5 flights. Helicopters landed in the villages Mokvi, Reka, Bedia and Tkhina delivering about 200–250 Russian and Kabardo boeviks.

==== 16 ====
Russian government distributed humanitarian aid to Tkvarcheli population. 30 "Kamaz" trucks and 3 buses together with humanitarian cargo delivered a great deal of weapons and ammunitions to Tkvarcheli.

==== 24 ====
The Parliament of Georgia sent an appeal to the UN Secretary General Boutros Boutros-Ghali, Russian president Boris Yeltsin and to the Supreme Council of Russia that noted that Russia violated May 14 Russian-Georgian Agreement.

=== July ===
==== 1 ====
After an unsuccessful storming of Sukhumi in March, Russian high commanders elaborated new plans on the following: 1. To seize Ochamchire highway using Tkvarcheli formations and simultaneously conduct landing; 2. To assault Gumista front, strategic buildings and commanding heights around Sukhumi and create appropriate bridgehead.

Abkhaz side initiated attacks to the East front. Main blow was directed to the village Tamishi.

==== 2 ====
300 boeviks landed in the village Tamishi of Ochamchire region, mostly Russian nationals. One tank, armored vehicle and one "Ural" truck with anti-aircraft setting ("Grad") were unloaded from the ship.

At the daybreak Abkhazs and their mercenaries broke through Georgian positions, seized railway line and highroads and fortified positions in Labra and Tamishi. Georgian fighters from battalions of "Kakutsa Cholokashvili", "Avaza", Dusheti, Akhaltsikhe and Kochara resisted the advance.

==== 2–10 ====
Near the village Tsagera of Ochamchire region Georgian military forces annihilated Abkhaz formations.

Intensive mortar fire of Georgians prevented another attempt of landing in Ochamchire region.

That attack caused many casualties. 600 perished, many were wounded and taken into custody. Three boats, one warship and two tanks had been destroyed. Two helicopters of separatists were shot down. 29

==== 4 ====
Near the village Shroma of Sukhumi region Russian helicopter, trying to conduct landing was brought down. Four fighters perished.

==== 5–9 ====
Russian detachments, Abkhaz separatists and mercenaries captured the villages Akhalsheni, Guma and Shroma of Sukhumi region. The fiercest struggle near the village Kamani took away the life of many Georgians. The enemy could not seize Tsugurovka. Separatists occupied almost every strategic heights and practically besieged Sukhumi.

Having rigorous battles Georgians managed to get back positions on Tamishi section reopened railway and highroads. Rescue Corp "Mkhedrioni", formation of ex-President supporters, the fighters of battalions 242, 243, artillery division 247, reconnaissance brigade 24, mining battalion and operational group led by Major-General Z. Uchadze took an active part in this battle. Head of the Security Service I. Batiashvili, J. Ioseliani and Mayor of Tbilisi K. Gabashvili were with Georgian fighters during the assault.

==== 6 ====
UN Security Council in New York City passed the resolution on sending 50 military observers to monitor the conflict. The decision exasperated Ardzinba and he expressed his negative attitude in the letter to UN.

Head of State of Georgia pronounced two months martial law on the territory of Abkhazia.

==== 8 ====
Georgian Parliament passed the resolution "On martial law on the territory of Abkhazia".

Ambassadors and Heads of International Missions accredited in Georgia (Germany, USA, Russia, Turkey, Iran, China, Armenia, Israel) visited Sukhumi. They met T. Nadareishvili who gave them information about conflict. Then Ed. Shevardnadze received the guests.

==== 12 ====
Battles near the village Tsugurovka of Sukhumi region are in progress.

==== 14 ====
Russian landing group seized strategically important Mount Mishveli of Gali region that is over Tkvarcheli. 50 Georgian fighters from Kaspi battalion perished during the night struggle.

==== 18 ====
Chairman of the Council of Defense of Abkhazia T. Nadareishvili had resigned due to ill-health and the Member of Georgian Parliament Zhiuli Shartava took that post.

By the statement of the Head of State T. Nadareishvili got an award, Vakhtang Gorgasali First Degree Decoration.

==== 26 ====
Head of State confers the rank of major general upon Zhiuli Shartava.

==== 27 ====
Ceasefire agreement is signed in Sochi. Russia still plays the role of mediator and guarantor.

Ex-President supporters organized mass meeting in Tbilisi requesting the continuation of military operations till the end.

Self-proclaimed Abkhazian navy is shelling Sukhumi (Dranda) airport.

==== 28 ====
Group of L. Kobalia enters Senaki again and offers T. Kitovani to stand together against central government. Kitovani refuses.

==== 29–30 ====
Abkhaz formations assaulted Georgian positions in Tamishi, Tsugurovka and Shroma-Akhalsheni. Attack lasted a few hours. Georgians repulsed attack that brought many casualties.

==== 30 ====
Observers started to carry out their mission according Peace-agreement. They observed conflict development in Gagra, Gudauta, Akhali Atoni (Novy Afon), Sukhumi, Ochamchire, Tkvarcheli and Gali.

==== 31 ====
After having negotiations with central government, the formation of Loti Kobalia left Senaki.

=== August ===
==== 1–20 ====
Georgian side gave proper treatment to the agreement: disbanded battalions, moved all military equipment and installations to Poti, left only two check-points at the Gumista River.

Joint commission controls Agreement implementation and Georgian side takes an active part in this process.

==== 2 ====
Head of State established Commission on Peaceful Resolution of Conflict chaired by Zhiuli Shartava that was to implement July 27 Agreement.

==== 6 ====
In a statement sent to Boutros-Ghali and Yeltsin Ardzinba blamed the Georgian side for mistreating the Agreement. That gave advance warning of Sukhumi assault.

==== 9 ====
Prime Minister of Georgia T. Sigua resigned.

==== 24 ====
V. Ardzinba meets Yeltsin in Moscow.

==== 28 ====
Formation of Loti Kobalia seized Senaki and Abasha.

==== 31 ====
62 Deputies of Gamsakhurdia's Parliament gathered in Zugdidi discussing Russian-Georgian relations, current situation and demanded broadcast time on TV.

=== September ===
==== 1–15 ====
Displaced people return to their homes. Schools and other educational institutions start operating again. Reconstruction of Sukhumi is in progress.

==== 7 ====
L. Kobalia tries to seize Gali.

==== 14 ====
Having conflict at the Parliament Shevardnadze announced his resignation. It was followed with a mass meeting of his supporters.

==== 15 ====
L. Kobalia starts "campaign" in Guria region.

==== 16 ====
Separatists begin assault to the East (Tkvarcheli-Ochamchire) front.

==== 17 ====
Russian detachments and confederant formations crossed Gumista River, took both bridges and seized part of Achadara. The forces were unequal. The Georgian side did not have technique and installations, neither launchers nor artillery; great lack of ammunition.

Backed with artillery and aviation enemy attacked the villages Tavisupleba, Birtskha and Odishi.

Mountain Peoples’ Confederation announced mobilization of all military formations to be dispatched to Abkhazia.

Shevardnadze has confidential meeting with P. Grachev in Adler.

==== 18 ====
The following is the appeal of Shevardnadze: "To all friends of my homeland, I am addressing you from the besieged Sukhumi not knowing if my words will ever reach you. The fighting is underway only a few blocks away from where I am with my friends. Regardless what happens I will not leave this town which has been treacherously deceived once again. I will not leave Sukhumi residents who have suffered immensely in their own town, left to their fate vis-a-vis a brutal, inhuman force, which keeps shelling the residential areas. 40 civilians had been killed and 153 wounded in the last two days. The total number of casualties has reached 2,031 while that of the wounded is 5802. How often have I asked myself – what is happening? What for?

The Gudauta leaders say they are fighting for freedom, for the right to live on their native land. But it is not the same freedom, or the same right that the 240 000 Georgians, whose roots on this soil can be traced many centuries back, thirst for and are trying to gain.... We did not intend to conquer anyone – can one conquer his own people or seize his own land – the seedbed of our culture and statehood. We only aspired to defend the sovereignty of the Republic, protect its vital communications, do away with the hotbeds of sabotage and terror, and we wanted to do all that with consent and participation of our Abkhaz fellow-countrymen.... I am writing this at 3 a.m. The city is being shelled. 1500 houses have already been destroyed. There is no water, no bread, no light and the hope is dwindling. The shelling continues. A few shells have just hit a maternity home, where there were mothers and their infants. I am not saying good-bye, I don’t want to. May God send you peace and happiness." 31

Minister of Defense of Russia makes a provocative announcement in Moscow: "Neither Georgians nor Abkhazs would like peace. One is up for blood while another is unable to control the situation. There is a real civil war in Georgia and not only on the territory of Abkhazia."

==== 19 ====
Joint Commission on conflict settlement had the first sitting in Adler. Destructive position of Abkhaz side made the meeting futile (First Deputy of Separatist Government N. Khashba was most active).

Formations of separatists are controlling Tamishi and Kindgha roadways.

Russian Government made a statement (signed by Viktor Chernomyrdin) on violation of ceasefire Agreement of 27 July 1993 by Abkhaz side that reads: "In case of further violation of Sochi Agreement from Abkhaz side the measures of International Law are to be exercised, in particular, the energy supply from the territory of Russia is to be cut off." 32 September 20

The all-Georgian women organization "Tetri Mandili" (Secretary Keti Dolidze) organized the action, which was directed against the war and bloodshed. The train in which there were hundreds of activists of various nationalities (Georgians, Russians, Ukrainians, Jews, Germans, Lithuanians, Armenians, Azerbaijanians, etc.), moved from Tbilisi to Abkhazia and reached Ochamchire.

==== 21 ====
Shevardnadze visited battle positions in the suburb of Sukhumi.

==== 21–23 ====
Russian detachments, Abkhaz separatists and mercenaries entered Sukhumi suburb.

Enemy formations moved ahead to Shroma side and approached Sukhumi funicular, seized Achadara and from Lechkopi Cemetery came to the Central Railway Station, crossed the railway till the sea shore and besieged Georgian battalions around lighthouse; another part moved along Chochua Street and joined them at the so-called Mount Trapezium.

==== 24 ====
At the press conference in Sukhumi Shevardnadze evaluated the situation.

Shevardnadze appeals to Sukhumi population and defenders by radio: "Dear friends, Citizens of Sukhumi and Georgia! Georgia is facing the most difficult days, especially Sukhumi. Separatists and foreign invaders entered into city. I am proud of your courage… Separatists and adventurers will be judged by history.... They do not want Georgians to live in this Georgian City. Many of them dreams to repeat the Gagra tragedy here.... I know that you understand the challenge we are facing. I know how difficult the situation is. Many people left the city but you stay here for Sukhumi and for Georgia… I call you, citizens of Sukhumi, fighters, officers and generals: I understand the difficulties of standing on the positions now, but we have no right to step back, we all have to keep our places. We have to fortify the city and save Sukhumi. I would like to tell you that all of us – Government of Abkhazia, Cabinet of Ministers, Mr. Zhiuli Shartava, his colleagues, city and regional government of Sukhumi are prepared for action. The enemy witnesses our readiness, that's why he is fighting in the most brutal way and destructs our beloved Sukhumi. I call you to keep peace, tenacity and self-control. We have to meet the enemy in our streets as they deserve." 33

==== 18–27 ====
Gamsakhurdia arrives in Senaki from Chechnya. He holds mass meetings in Senaki, Chkhorotsqu, Zugdidi and Gali; He also arrives in Ochamchire and meets some field-commanders and L. Kobalia formation.

==== 16–27 ====
A Forty-five day cease-fire led displaced civilians to return. Civil aviation has no capacity to evacuate the civilians that are affected, The population, already adapted to shelling and bombardments is leaving the city en masse. Nobody had believed that Sukhumi would have fallen. They did not feel that harm was able to reach those Georgians which were staying in Sukhumi.

Civilian flights were canceled, and volunteers helped injured civilians. Georgian casualties were reported in the fighting. A plane carrying civilians was shot down at Sukhumi airport.

Separatists brought down another airplane with civilians on board.

Shelling Sukhumi airport separatists blew up a plane that was just about to evacuate civilians. Son of world-known athlete Levan Tediashvili, Vakhtang Tediashvili dies rescuing people from the burning airplane.

Negotiations with the supporters of ex-President Gamsakhurdia are in progress. Their military formations are dislocated in Samegrelo region. Their leaders (Loti Kobalia, Akakiy Eliava) do not agree to fight against enemies together with "Junta" (as they called Central Government) army and leaves alone besieged Sukhumi.

In the vicinity of the Kodori River Georgians dislocated about 3000 fighters and 60 armored vehicles. There are also some formations of ex-President. For some reasons they can not force over the river and help Sukhumi.

==== 29 ====
Together with Georgian Military Headquarter Shevardnadze moves to Agudzera.

The Parliament of Georgia calls Head of State Shevardnadze back to Tbilisi to continue his duty, prevent more bloodshed and larger civil war.

==== 25–28 ====
The population and military formations retreated on two directions. Boats evacuated part of them from Gulripshi and another part (the largest one) moved through Kodori Gorge Merkheuli-Tsebelda-Lata-Azhara-Gentsvishi-Chkhalta-Sakeni road. Thousands of people, hundreds of cars and trucks took their Calvary way. There was no food. Local population helped them as they could. People moved to Chuberi Crossing. Night is too cold there. Women, children and elders were getting sick. Victims of hunger and cold have never been reliably counted. Many deceased were buried just right there. Georgia appealed for help to the world. Many countries responded, especially Ukraine and Armenia, which sent helicopters. The Government and local population shared bread, meat, and warm clothing. But the facts of marauding and plunder were also fixed. People abandoned the cars and continued moving on foot.

==== 28 ====
Bombardment is undertaken in Gulripshi region (Machara, Agudzera, Dranda airport). Dranda airport is shelled both, from the water-area and ground.

Airplane takes off from Dranda airport having on board Eduard Shevardnadze, A. Jorbenadze, I. Batiashvili, K. Gabashvili, A. Kavsadze, Sh. Kviraia, journalist R. Egadze, security officers (most of them left Sukhumi through Kodori Gorge), many children and women. Shelling is conducted from the sea, but high-qualified pilots prevent the crash and the plane lands to Tbilisi via Batumi.

The Dranda airport Director Z. Khaindrava, having fixed (at the very last minutes) the damaged plane, manages to deliver to Tbilisi 120 elders, children and women via Gali and Kutaisi.

==== 29 ====
Separatists and mercenaries seized Gulripshi.

==== 30 ====
Abkhaz seized Ochamchire and Gali and reached Enguri River at 20.00 hour.

Gali population fled to Zugdidi and Tsalenjikha regions.
