= Mingrelians =

Ethnographic group of Georgians

Mingrelians Mingrelian: მარგალეფი Margalepi Georgian: მეგრელები Megrelebi
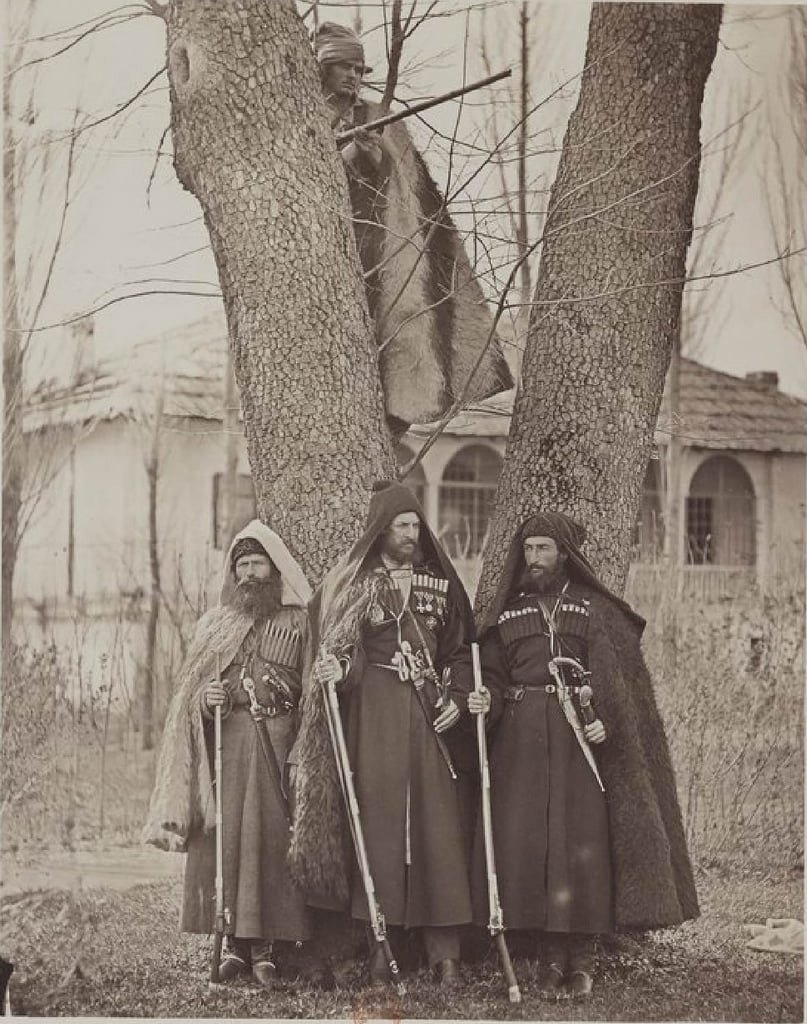
- Megrelians, by J. X. Raoult, 1870s

Total population
- c. 400,000

Regions with significant populations
- Georgia 400,000 (Note: Including Abkhazia, where 46,000 Mingrelians and other Georgians live.)

Languages
- Mingrelian, Georgian

Religion
- Predominantly Eastern Orthodox Christianity (Georgian Orthodox Church)

The Mingrelians (Note: Also called Megrelians, Mingrels or Megrels) (Mingrelian: მარგალეფი, romanized: margalepi; Georgian: მეგრელები, romanized: megrelebi) are an indigenous Kartvelian-speaking ethnic subgroup of Georgians that mostly live in the Samegrelo-Zemo Svaneti (Mingrelian: სამარგალო, romanized: samargalo; Georgian: სამეგრელო, romanized: samegrelo) region of Georgia. They also live in considerable numbers in Abkhazia and Tbilisi. In the pre-1930 Soviet census, the Mingrelians were afforded their own ethnic group category, alongside many other ethnic subgroups of Georgians.

The Mingrelians speak the Mingrelian language, and are typically bilingual also in Georgian. Both these languages belong to the Kartvelian language family.

== History ==
In the 13th century BC, the Kingdom of Colchis was formed as a result of the increasing consolidation of the tribes inhabiting the region, which covered modern western Georgia. The endonym margalepi (მარგალეფი) is presumably reflected in the Greek Manraloi (Μάνραλοι), recorded as a people of Colchis by Ptolemy in the 2nd century CE.

By the mid-3rd century, the Lazi tribe came to dominate most of Colchis, establishing the kingdom of Lazica (or Egrisi in Georgian sources). In the 5th century, the first Christian king Gubazes I declared Christianity as a state religion of Lazica. Locals began to have closer contact with the Greeks and acquired various Hellenic cultural traits, including in some cases the language. From 542 to 562, Lazica was a scene of the protracted rivalry between the Eastern Roman and Sassanid empires, culminating in the Lazic War. Emperor Heraclius's offensive in 628 AD brought victory over the Persians and ensured Roman predominance in Lazica until the invasion and conquest of the Caucasus by the Arabs in the second half of the 7th century.

In the 7th century Lazica fell to the Muslim conquest; however, in the 8th century combined Lazic and Abasgian forces successfully repelled the Arab occupation. In 780 Lazica was incorporated into the Kingdom of Abkhazia as a result of dynastic succession, the latter led the unification of the Georgian monarchy in the 11th century. The nobility and clergy of Lazica switched from the Hellenic ecclesiastic tradition to the Georgian, and Georgian became the language of culture and education. After the fragmentation of the Kingdom of Georgia in the 15th century, Mingrelia was an autonomous principality within the Kingdom of Imereti, until being annexed by the Russian Empire in the 19th century.

In several censuses under the Russian Empire and the early Soviet Union, Mingrelian were considered a separate group, largely because at the time of the annexation Mingrelia was politically separate from eastern Georgia, the historical political and cultural centers of the Medieval Georgian Kingdoms. They were reclassified under the broader category of Georgian in the 1930s. Currently, most Mingrelians identify themselves as a subgroup of the Georgian nation and have preserved many characteristic cultural features – including the Mingrelian language – that date back to the pre-Christian Colchian era.

Lavrentiy Beria, the Chief of Stalin's secret police, was a Mingrelian (Stalin himself was a Georgian).

The first President of an independent Georgia, Zviad Gamsakhurdia (1939–1993), was a Mingrelian and also a creator of Georgian nationalism. Therefore, after the violent coup d'état of December 21, 1991 – January 6, 1992, Mingrelia became the center of a civil war, which ended with the defeat of Gamsakhurdia's supporters.

Approximately 180,000–200,000 Mingrelian and other subgroups of Georgian people have been expelled from Abkhazia as a result of the Abkhaz–Georgian conflict in the early 1990s and the ensuing ethnic cleansing of Georgians in this separatist region.

== Notable Mingrelians ==
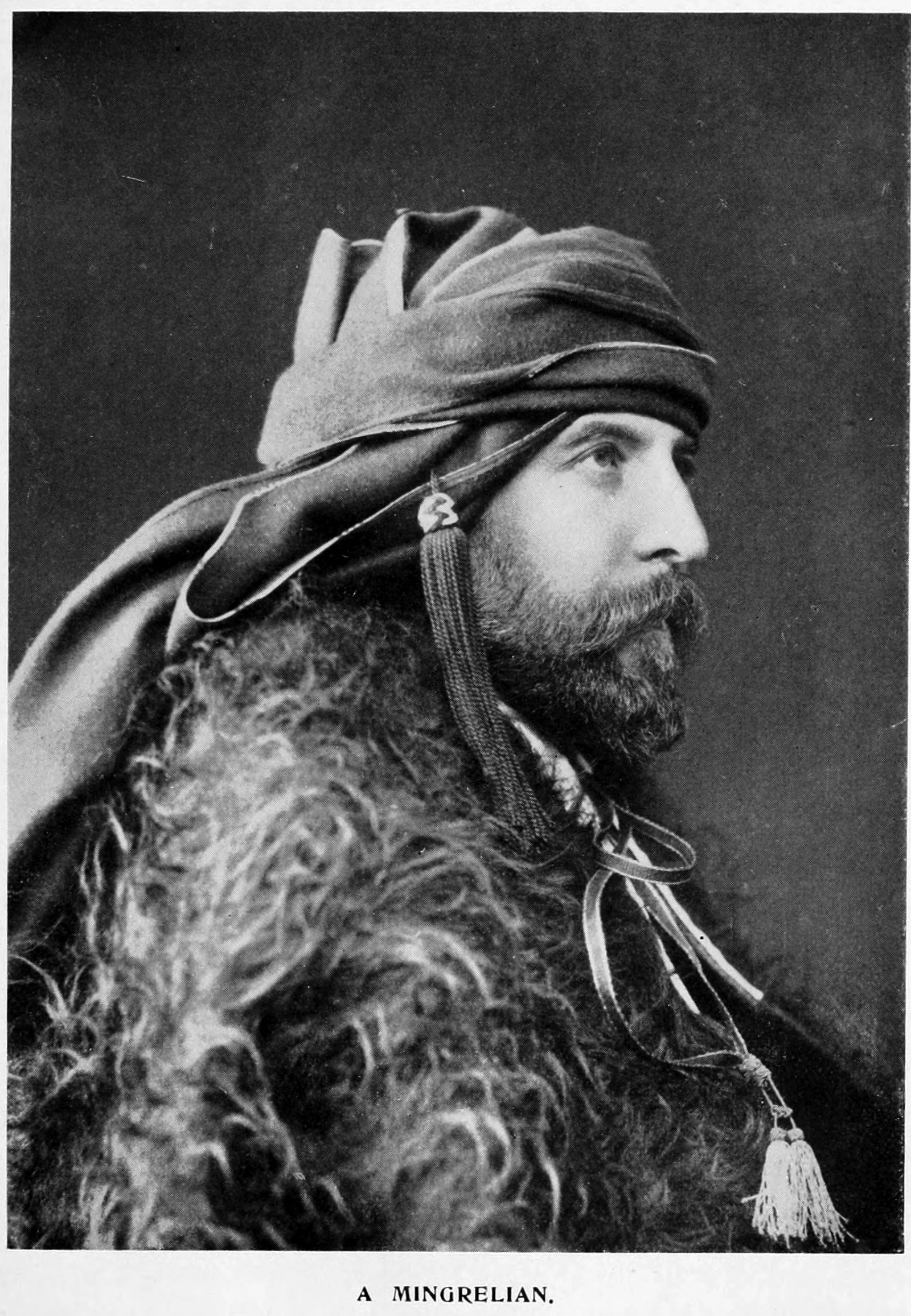
A Mingrelian (c. 1900)

- Konstantine Gamsakhurdia (1893–1975), Georgian writer and one of the most influential figures in 20th-century Georgian literature.
- Zviad Gamsakhurdia (1939–1993), Georgian politician and the first President of Georgia (in office: 1991–1992)
- Lavrentiy Beria (1899–1953), Georgian politician, notorious chief of secret police in Stalin's USSR, NKVD head, and former First Deputy Premier of the Soviet Union
- Merab Kostava (1939–1989), Georgian dissident, poet, musician, and National Hero of Georgia
- Ambrosi Khelaia (1861–1927), Catholicos-Patriarch of all Georgia
- Tedo Sakhokia (1868–1956), Georgian ethnographer, lexicologist, folklore scientist, translator, opinion journalist, and educator
- Akaki Khoshtaria (1868–1956), Georgian entrepreneur, socialite, and philanthropist
- Şevkefza Sultan (c. 1825–1889), Ottoman Valide sultan in 1876
- Guram Gabiskiria (1947–1993), Georgian politician and National Hero of Georgia
- Zhiuli Shartava (1944–1993), Georgian politician and National Hero of Georgia
- Geno Adamia (1936–1993), Georgian military officer and National Hero of Georgia
- Alexander Berulava (1945–1993), Georgian journalist, awarded Vakhtang Gorgasali First grade order for courage and heroism in the protection of the homeland and its territorial integrity
- Meliton Kantaria (1920–1993), Georgian sergeant of the Soviet Army, credited with hoisting a Soviet flag over the Reichstag
- Vera Pagava (1907–1988), Georgian artist
- Ilia Topuria (born 1997), Georgian professional mixed martial artist
- Khvicha Kvaratskhelia (born 2001), Georgian football player
- Tornike Shengelia (born 1991), Georgian basketball player
- Zaza Pachulia (born 1984), Georgian basketball player
- Mamia Alasania (1943–1993), Georgian military officer and National Hero of Georgia
- Shio III of Georgia (born 1969), Georgian prelate, Catholicos-Patriarch of All Georgia
- Demna (born 1981), Georgian fashion designer, creative director of Gucci

== See also ==
- Mingrelian affair
- Laz people

== Bibliography ==
- Stephen F. Jones. Mingrelians. World Culture Encyclopedia.
