= List of wars involving Abkhazia =

This is a list of wars involving post-Soviet Abkhazia (1991-present).

== List ==
Conflict	Combatant 1	Combatant 2	Results	Head of State of Abkhazia	Georgian losses	Abkhazian losses
War in Abkhazia (1992–1993)	Abkhazia; Confederation of Mountain Peoples of the Caucasus Supported by: Russia (Note: See Russia's role in the conflict section for more details)	Georgia	Russian and abkhaz victory: Abkhazia becomes a de-facto independent republic	Vladislav Ardzinba	4,000 combatants and civilians killed, 10,000 wounded, 1,000 missing, 250,000 ethnic Georgians displaced.	2,220 combatants killed, ~8,000 wounded, 122 missing in action, 1,820 civilians killed.
Guerilla War in Abkhazia (1993-2008)	AbkhaziaRussia	(Georgia (country)) White Legion (Georgia (country)) Forest Brothers Mkhedrioni	Abkhazian Victory: Georgian Guerrillas defeated; Start of Russo-Georgian War	Vladislav Ardzinba	?	?
War in Abkhazia (1998)	Abkhazia	Georgian separatists: White Legion; Mkhedrioni; Forest Brothers	Abkhazian victory	Vladislav Ardzinba	Georgian sources: 17 killed, 24 wounded, 56 captured, 6 missing. Abkhazian sources: 160 killed	Abkhazian sources: 8 killed, 17 wounded Georgian sources: 300+ killed, dozens wounded
Russo-Georgian War (2008)	Russia; South Ossetia (Note: South Ossetia's status is disputed. It considers itself to be an independent state, but this is recognised by only a few other countries. The Georgian government and most of the world's other states consider South Ossetia de jure a part of Georgia's territory.); Abkhazia (Note: The political status of Abkhazia is disputed. Having unilaterally declared independence from Georgia in 1992, Abkhazia is formally recognised as an independent state by 4 UN member states (three other states previously recognised it but then withdrew their recognition), while the remainder of the international community recognizes it as de jure Georgian territory. Georgia continues to claim the area as its own territory, designating it as Russian-occupied territory.)	Georgia	Russian, South Ossetian and Abkhaz victory: Ethnic cleansing of Georgians from South Ossetia and the Kodori Gorge in Abkhazia; Recognition of South Ossetia and Abkhazia by Russia; Russian military bases established in Abkhazia and South Ossetia; Severance of Georgia–Russia relations; Georgia loses control of Kodori Valley in Abkhazia, as well as Akhalgori Municipality and parts of the Tskhinvali District in South Ossetia.	Sergei Bagapsh	See main article.	

== See also ==
- List of wars involving Georgia (country)
- List of wars involving Russia
- List of conflicts in territory of the former Soviet Union
- Abkhazia–Georgia border
