= 1998 Gali clashes =

Ethnic conflict in Georgia

- Part of the Abkhazia conflict
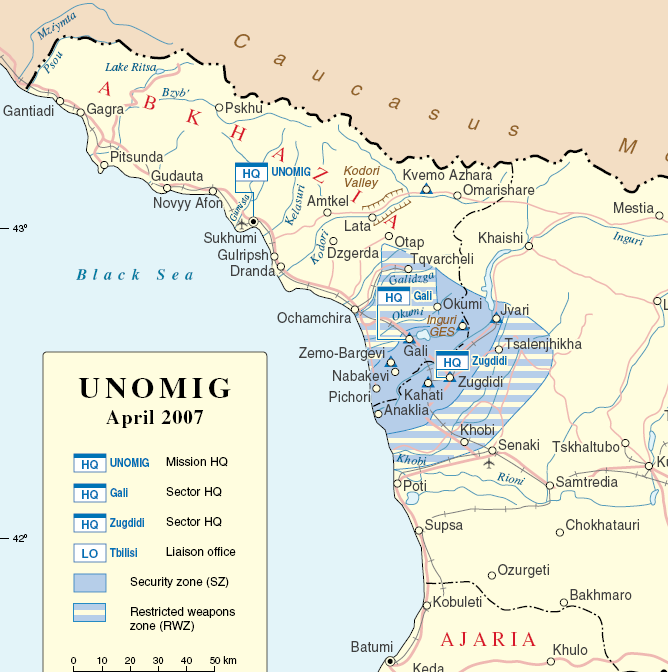
- UNOMIG map of the conflict region
| Date | 18–26 May 1998 (1 week and 1 day) |
| Location | Gali District |
| Result | See Aftermath |

Belligerents
| Abkhazia | Georgian paramilitaries; White Legion; Mkhedrioni; Forest Brothers |

Commanders and leaders
| Vladislav Ardzinba; Sergei Bagapsh | Zurab Samushia (White Legion); Dato Shengelia (Forest Brothers); Gujar Kurashvili |

Strength
| 1,500 troops | 400 guerrillas |

Casualties and losses
| Abkhazia: 8 killed 17 wounded Georgian sources: 300+ killed dozens wounded | Georgian sources: 17 killed 24 wounded 56 captured 6 missing Abkhazia: 160 killed |
- 35 Georgian civilians killed 30,000–40,000 displaced

The 1998 Gali clashes took place in the Gali district of Abkhazia, after ethnic Georgians launched an insurgency against the Abkhazian separatist government. The conflict is sometimes referred to as the Six-Day War of Abkhazia; however, this name only takes into account the Abkhazian offensive that lasted from 20 to 26 May 1998, while hostilities and insurgent attacks had already occurred before that date.

== Background ==
Following the end of the 1992–1993 War in Abkhazia, which resulted in the Ethnic cleansing of Georgians from the region, there were virtually no Georgians left in Abkhazia, except some pockets and the Gali district, the Abkhazia’s southernmost province. The situation in the Gali district remained unstable, with the tensions between the Georgian refugees trying to return to their homes in Abkhazia and the Abkhaz militias preventing them from doing so, which was marked by violence. There was an outbreak of violence in Gali in February 1994, the first major escalation since the end of the war. In November 1994, the Abkhaz separatist authorities closed the Georgian schools in Gali and began erecting a barbed-wire fence along the Enguri river separating Abkhazia with the rest of Georgia. In late December, they pulled out from Gali, which allowed larger inflow of refugees, however, they returned in late January of 1995 and the violence continued.

Several paramilitaries were formed in the region by Georgians, including White Legion and Forest Brothers.

== Timeline ==
In the eighteen months prior to the war, Georgian paramilitary forces systematically attacked both Russian peacekeeping troops and the Abkhazian military.

In the beginning of May, 300 fighters from the Georgian paramilitary White Legion crossed into Abkhazia, whereupon the Abkhazian government placed its military on combat alert. The White Legion was said to have received orders from Tamaz Nadareishvili, head of Georgia's government in exile for Abkhazia and member of Georgia's Security Council. In addition, Tornike Berishvili, a leader of the Mkhedrioni, declared on 27 May that 100 of its men had also fought in Abkhazia. According to Georgian sources, on 2 and 3 May Georgian forces gained control of the villages of Saberio, near the Inguri Dam, and Khumushkuri, and killed six Abkhazian soldiers when Abkhazian forces tried to retake the two villages. On 12 May, Georgian MP Germane Patsatsia announced that he was resigning to join the Georgian guerillas in Abkhazia who he claimed had seized control of Gali District.

On 18 May, Georgian forces killed about twenty Abkhazian policemen in a surprise attack in the village of Repi. The next day, Abkhazian troops carried out reprisal attacks, resulting in ten to thirty deaths and causing Georgian residents to flee across the border. The following days saw minor, sporadic clashes as the Abkhazian Interior Ministry sent 800 more men into Gali District. Abkhazian forces were reported to set fire to Georgian homes.

On 22 May, the two sides signed a cease-fire agreement in Tbilisi, which was broken that same day when fighting broke out in the village of Tskhiri, killing four people. The next three days saw fierce fighting, with ITAR-TASS reporting the death of 40 Abkhazian soldiers, 4 Georgian soldiers and more than 20 Georgian civilians.

On 25 May, the Georgian and Abkhazian foreign ministers signed another cease-fire agreement in Gagra, set to take effect at 6:00 the following day, but fighting continued. On the night of 26 to 27 May, Abkhazian forces expelled the last Georgian guerillas.

Georgia's opposition blamed President Eduard Shevardnadze for losing the war by not supporting the guerillas with the Georgian Military. Shevardnadze declared that one of the reasons he had not sent in the military was it was not combat-ready.

== Aftermath ==
The 1998 hostilities in the Gali district fundamentally destabilized the region and altered the trajectory of the Abkhaz–Georgian peace process. Following several days of intense combat, a ceasefire protocol was signed in Gagra on 25 May 1998 by Georgian Foreign Minister Irakli Menagharishvili and Abkhaz representative Sergei Shamba. The agreement, which was also signed by the United Nations special envoy and the commander of the CIS peacekeeping forces, called for an immediate cessation of hostilities, the withdrawal of Abkhaz reinforcements, and the safe return of refugees to the Gali raion.

Despite the protocol, the ceasefire failed to take effect on schedule on 26 May. The Georgian leadership, including President Eduard Shevardnadze, disclaimed official jurisdiction over partisan groups such as the White Legion and the Forest Brothers, which complicated efforts to ensure their compliance with the truce. While Abkhaz authorities claimed to have neutralized these guerrilla forces, ongoing skirmishes suggested that the security situation remained volatile.

The conflict resulted in a severe humanitarian crisis as between 30,000 and 40,000 ethnic Georgian civilians, many of whom had only recently returned following the 1992–1993 war, were forced to flee Gali for the second time. Reports from the period indicated that dozens of civilians were killed and approximately 1,500 houses were burned during Abkhaz "sweep operations" against local villages. This mass displacement created a powerful new pressure group within Georgian domestic politics, further complicating Shevardnadze's position.

The reputation of the Russian-led CIS peacekeeping force was significantly damaged by the events. Allegations surfaced among the Georgian public and officials that the peacekeepers had either actively supplied Abkhaz forces with heavy artillery or failed to intervene to protect Georgian civilians. These accusations led to renewed demands from the Georgian opposition for the withdrawal of Russian troops. Ultimately, the 1998 clashes stripped the Abkhaz leadership of incentives to compromise on the region's political status, further entrenching the diplomatic stalemate between Tbilisi and Sukhumi.
