= Sumbat Saakian =

Georgian politician

Sumbat Saakian (Armenian: Սումբատ Սահակյան; 1951–1993) was an ethnic Armenian politician in the Government of Abkhazian Autonomous Republic who was killed in Sukhumi along with Zhiuli Shartava, Guram Gabiskiria and others by Abkhaz separatist rebels during the Sukhumi massacre on September 27, 1993.

== See also ==
- Sukhumi massacre
