= Raul Eshba =

Georgian politician (1944–1993)

Raul Eshba (Abkhaz: Раул Эшба; Georgian: რაულ ეშბა) (1944 – 27 September 1993) was a pro-Georgian ethnic Abkhaz politician who was killed in Sukhumi along with Zhiuli Shartava, Guram Gabiskiria, Alexander Berulava and others by Abkhaz separatist rebels during the mass murder of Georgians in Abkhazia on 27 September 1993. He was reburied in Tbilisi in 2017.

== See also ==
- List of Abkhazians
- Sukhumi Massacre
