= Ethnic cleansing of Georgians in Sukhumi =

1993 massacre

Sukhumi massacre
- Part of the 1992–1993 war in Abkhazia and ethnic cleansing of Georgians in Abkhazia
- Date: 27 September 1993; 33 years ago
- Location: Sukhumi, Abkhazia, Georgia; 43°00′12″N 41°00′55″E
- Motive: Anti-Georgian sentiment
- Target: Georgian population of Sukhumi, Georgian administration of Abkhazia
- Perpetrators: Abkhazian Armed Forces; Confederation of Mountain Peoples of the Caucasus; Bagramyan Battalion
- Outcome: Ethnic cleansing of the Georgian population
- Deaths: 1,000 (Georgian estimate)
- Displaced: 50,000

The Sukhumi massacre took place on 27 September 1993, during and after the fall of Sukhumi into separatist hands in the course of the War in Abkhazia. It was perpetrated against Georgian civilians of Sukhumi, mainly by militia forces of Abkhaz separatists and North Caucasian allies. It became part of a violent ethnic cleansing campaign carried out by the separatists.

== Events ==
On 27 September 1993, separatist forces violated the ceasefire initiated by the United Nations and guaranteed by the Russian Federation, which barred both sides from performing military operations. As part of the ceasefire, Georgian forces had withdrawn their heavy artillery and tanks from Sukhumi. Abkhaz, Confederation of Mountain Peoples of the Caucasus and Cossack militants stormed Sukhumi early in the morning. Confronted by large numbers of combatants, the Georgian army units that remained in the city were unable to prevent the separatist advance into the city. By noon, separatist militants and their allies had taken over television buildings and bridges. Georgian forces retreated to the Government building of the Abkhazian Autonomous Republic, where they intended to provide security for members of Abkhazian Autonomous Republic Government. By late afternoon, the city was overrun by separatists and their allies.

Placing their hopes on the ceasefire, a large number of civilians remained in the city. The separatists and their allies started to sweep through the streets of Sukhumi rounding up all civilians that they found. Men, women and children were executed in the streets, on the roads and inside their own apartments, houses and back yards. According to the witnesses, many people became objects of torture, and some were forced to watch as their own family members were killed—children in front of their parents, and parents in front of their children.

When Abkhaz entered my house, they took me and my seven year old son outside. After forcing us to kneel, they took my son and shot him right in front of me. After they grabbed me by the hair and took me to the nearby well. An Abkhaz soldier forced me to look down that well; there I saw three younger man and couple of elderly woman who were standing soaking in water naked. They were screaming and crying while Abkhaz were dumping dead corpses on them. After that, they threw a grenade there and placed more people inside. I was forced again to kneel in front of the dead corpses. One of the soldiers took his knife and took the eye out from one of the dead near me. Then he started to rub my lips and face with that gouged eye. I could not take it any longer and fainted. They left me there in a pile of corpses.

The massacres occurred in the city park, in front of the governmental building, in schools and hospitals. Almost all members of the Abkhaz government (those who refused to leave the city) — Zhiuli Shartava, Guram Gabiskiria, Alexander Berulava, Mamia Alasania, and Raul Eshba — were captured and executed.

The 1994 U.S. State Department Country Reports also describes scenes of massive human rights abuse:

The [Abkhaz] separatist forces committed widespread atrocities against the Georgian civilian population, killing many women, children, and elderly, capturing some as hostages and torturing others ... they also killed large numbers of Georgian civilians who remained behind in Abkhaz-seized territory.

The separatists launched a reign of terror against the majority Georgian population, although other nationalities also suffered. Chechens and other North Caucasians from the Russian Federation reportedly joined local Abkhaz troops in the commission of atrocities. ... Those fleeing Abkhazia made highly credible claims of atrocities, including the killing of civilians without regard for age or sex. Corpses recovered from Abkhaz-held territory showed signs of extensive torture. (The evidence available to Human Rights Watch supports the U.S. State Department's findings.)

== Aftermath ==
Eduard Shevardnadze fled the city only just before the arrival of separatist forces, having earlier committed to try to remain there as long as possible. Soon the forces overran the whole territory of Abkhazia, except a small region of the Kodori Gorge (which remained under the control of the Georgian warlord Emzar Kvitsiani until July 2006 and later the Tbilisi government until August 2008). The total defeat of the Georgian government forces was followed by the ethnic cleansing of the Georgian population. 200,000 - 250,000 refugees (mainly Georgians) were forced out of Abkhazia. Violence continued in 1994 despite an agreement between the Georgian and Abkhazian governments for the deployment of a peacekeeping force from the Commonwealth of Independent States. Chechen militants who had fought on the side of Abkhazia later took part in the First Chechen War.

== Perpetrators ==
There are a number of conflicting claims as to whether the massacre was conducted by Abkhaz militias or those of their North Caucasian allies. Allegedly partly responsible for the massacre was the commander of the separatist forces, deputy defence minister and "hero" of Abkhazia Shamil Basaev. According to witness testimonies, the militants spoke North Caucasian languages and Russian. However, some refugees who survived the massacre have claimed that they recognized their Abkhaz and Armenian neighbours collaborating with the militants during the massacres in various neighbourhoods.

== See also ==
- Ethnic cleansing of Georgians in Abkhazia
- Georgian-Abkhaz conflict
- United Nations resolutions on Abkhazia

== Bibliography ==
- Chervonnaia, Svetlana Mikhailovna. Conflict in the Caucasus: Georgia, Abkhazia, and the Russian Shadow. Gothic Image Publications, 1994.
- Human Rights Watch (March 1995). "Georgia/Abkhazia: Violations of the Laws of War and Russia's Role in the Conflict". Human Rights Watch.
- Lynch, Dov. The Conflict in Abkhazia: Dilemmas in Russian 'Peacekeeping' Policy. Royal Institute of International Affairs, February 1998.
- Marshania L. Tragedy of Abkhazia Moscow, 1996
- White Book of Abkhazia. 1992–1993 Documents, Materials, Evidences. Moscow, 1993.
- Derluguian, Georgi M., The Tale of Two Resorts: Abkhazia and Ajaria Before and Since the Soviet Collapse, in Beverly Crawford and Ronnie D Lipschutz (eds.), "The Myth of 'Ethnic Conflict': Politics, Economics, and Cultural Violence" (Berkeley: University of California, 1998). p. 263
