= Mingrelian =

Mingrelian may refer to:

- the Mingrelians
- the Mingrelian language
