= Gujar Kurashvili =

Georgian general

Gujar Kurashvili (Georgian: გუჯარ ყურაშვილი; born 1 June 1951) is a former Georgian general who was involved in the War in Abkhazia in the 1990s. He was convicted of plotting a 1999 coup d'etat in 2001, pardoned for it in 2002 and compensated for the miscarriage of justice in 2009.

== Military career ==
Born in the village of Khovle (Kaspi district), Kurashvili began his career in the Soviet military in 1968 and retired with the rank of a colonel in February 1992. The same year he returned to Georgia and joined the Georgian military, being appointed a commander of an Interior Troops brigade. He took part in the War in Abkhazia (1992–93), where he commanded the Gumista front and was promoted, in July 1993, to the rank of major general in recognition of his success in defending Sukhumi. In September 1993, he was among the last defenders of Sukhumi. Years later, he blamed the political leadership of Georgia for the loss of Sukhumi, but claimed the Georgian forces were still able to defend Ochamchire and Gali, which the Georgian military commanders evacuated without any significant resistance.

In the mid-1990s, he served as Deputy Defense Minister and commander of the Georgian Land Forces. In May 1998, he was again involved in Abkhazia, during the brief War in Abkhazia (1998) in Gali District. In later interviews, Kurashvili blamed the defense officials in Shevardnadze's government for abandoning the initially successful Georgian guerrillas during the fighting.

== Arrest, conviction and exoneration ==
On 22–24 May 1999, Kurashvili and nine other people were arrested over accusations of plotting to assassinate President of Georgia Eduard Shevardnadze and seize power in the country. The trial opened at the Supreme Court of Georgia in April 2001. The Georgian authorities claimed that former security minister, Igor Giorgadze, wanted for involvement in the failed 1995 assassination attempt against Shevardnadze, was behind the plot. Shevardnadze said the plot was masterminded in Russia to thwart Georgia's rapprochement with the West and intended to eliminate the country's entire leadership.

In November 2001, Kurashvili and former members of National Security Ministry's Alpha special unit, Archil Panjikidze and Kakhaber Kantaria, were found guilty of plotting the overthrow of the constitutional order and each sentenced to three years in prison. Kurashvili denied the involvement, claiming that the charges were trumped-up to get rid of the witness of the "treacherous mistakes" of the Georgian leadership in the conflict of Abkhazia. In 2002, Kurashvili was pardoned by Shevardnadze.

Kurashvili, Panjikidze, and Kantaria appealed to the European Court of Human Rights, which ruled, on 27 October 2009, that Georgia had breached the Article 6 of the European Convention on Human Rights (right to a fair trial) and imposed the state of Georgia to pay EUR 2.000 to the three men for non-pecuniary damage.
