= Malkhaz Akishbaia =

Georgian Abkhaz politician

- Малхас Акшба
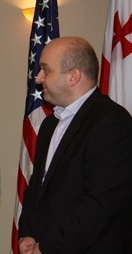
- Malkhaz Akishbaia

5th Chairman of Council of Ministers of the de jure Government of the Autonomous Republic of Abkhazia
- In office March 2006 – June 2009
- Preceded by: Irakli Alasania
- Succeeded by: Giorgi Baramia

Malkhaz Akishbaia (Abkhaz: Малхас Акшба, Georgian: მალხაზ აკიშბაია; born May 6, 1972) is an Abkhaz politician and the Chairman of Council of Ministers of the de jure Government of the Autonomous Republic of Abkhazia (GARA) from March 2006 to June 2009.

Born in Gudava, Gali district, Abkhaz ASSR, Georgian SSR, in 1972, Akishbaia graduated from Kyiv University in 1994 and finished his master's degree at University of Oxford. He worked for the ministries of economics (1999–2001) and defense (2004) and for the National Security Council of Georgia (2004). From December 2004 to March 2006, he served as a minister of finances within the GARA and became the chair of this government in March 2006. His government was in exile in Tbilisi after the war with Russia in August 2008. He resigned on June 11, 2009, and was succeeded by Giorgi Baramia as the chairman of the GARA. Akishbaia was later appointed deputy Minister of Agriculture of Georgia.
