= Mamia Alasania =

Georgian military commander

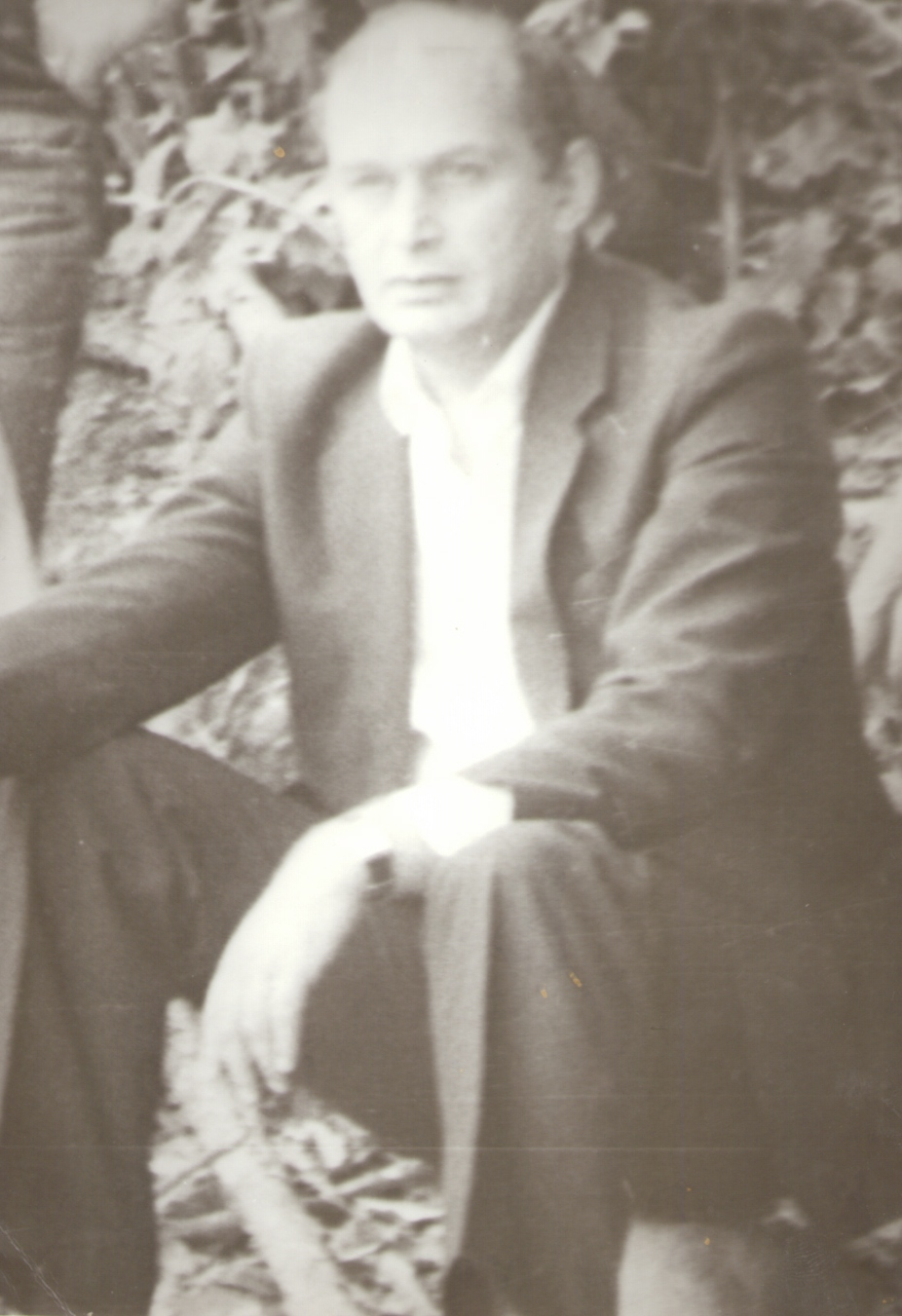
- Born: 6 May 1943; Samegrelo, Georgian SSR, USSR
- Died: 27 September 1993 (aged 50); Sukhumi, Abkhazia
- Occupation: Colonel in the Georgian Army

Mamia Alasania (Georgian: მამია ალასანია; 6 May 1943 – 27 September 1993) was a colonel of the Georgian Armed Forces, defending the Government of the Georgian Autonomous Republic of Abkhazia from Abkhaz separatists during the conflict in Abkhazia in 1990s. When the city of Sukhumi fell to the Abkhaz separatist forces, Mamia Alasania, along with Zhiuli Shartava, Guram Gabiskiria, Alexander Berulava, Geno Adamia and others, refused to flee and was captured by the Abkhaz militants. He was killed during the Sukhumi Massacre, on September 27, 1993. He was posthumously awarded the Order of the National Hero in 2018.

== Life and career ==
Mamia Alasania was born in Georgia's region of Mingrelia on May 6, 1943. He graduated from the Polytechnic Institute of Tbilisi and, later, from the upper school of State Security in Moscow. During his professional career, Mamia Alasania served in counterintelligence for nearly 30 years, including two tours in Afghanistan (1980-1981). After Georgia's independence in 1991, he was designated as the Deputy Chair of the country's State Security Agency. In 1992–1993, Mamia Alasania was invested by the Georgian State with a special mission and sent to the Samegrelo region of Georgia in order to resolve the existing civil confrontation.

== Legacy ==
After the assassination of his father, his son, Irakli Alasania, joined a gruelling march out of Abkhazia, then-aged sixteen. From that point forward, Irakli Alasania identified his professional ambition as contributing to the defence and reintegration of a whole and free Georgia. In 2005, he was tasked with serving as the Georgian President's Special Envoy for the Georgian-Abkhaz Peace Talks, which he successfully re-initiated the same year. In this capacity, Irakli Alasania focused on building trust between the sides and efforts at reconciliation. From 2012, when Georgian Dream Coalition came to power after parliamentary elections, Irakli Alasania become the Minister of Defense of Georgia.

In October 2017, Alasania's body was uncovered in Abkhazia and transferred to Tbilisi, where he was interred with military honors at the Church of St. Nicholas of Narikala.
