= Alexander Berulava =

Georgian politician, journalist, and human rights activist

Alexander (Sasha) Berulava ალექსანდრე (საშა) ბერულავა
- Alexander Berulava's official portrait, Sukhumi
- Born: Alexander Berulava (Georgian: ალექსანდრე ბერულავა); 11 November 1945; Sukhumi, Abkhazian ASSR, Georgian SSR, USSR
- Died: 27 September 1993 (aged 46); Sukhumi, Georgia
- Resting place: Unknown
- Education: Tbilisi State University
- Occupations: Journalist, writer
- Spouse: Natela Gogia
- Children: Iya
- Writing career
- Period: 1970–1993
- Subjects: Politics, human rights,
- Notable awards: Vakhtang Gorgasali Order, First Rank

Alexander "Sasha" Berulava (Georgian: ალექსანდრე (საშა) ბერულავა; 11 November 1945 – 27 September 1993) was a Georgian journalist, writer, and human rights activist, founder of the Georgian Television of Abkhazia, who was murdered by Abkhaz separatists during the ethnic cleansing of Georgians in Abkhazia in 1993 together with other members of the Government of Abkhazia.

== Early life ==
Alexander Berulava was born on 11 November 1945 in Sukhumi, Georgia. Berulava graduated from the Tbilisi State University, Faculty of Journalism.

== Political career and death ==
Berulava joined the Council of Ministers and the Council of Self-Defense of Abkhazian Autonomous Republic during the Georgian-Abkhazian War in 1993 and served as the head of Military Press-Center. When the city of Sukhumi fell to the Abkhaz separatists on 27 September 1993, Berulava along with other authorities from the Government of Abkhazian Autonomous Republic (Zhiuli Shartava, Raul Eshba, Mamia Alasania, Guram Gabiskiria and others) refused to leave the besieged city and was captured by Abkhaz militants and North Caucasian volunteers.

Based on video materials, Human rights documents and witness accounts of the event, Berulava, Gabiskiria, Shartava, Eshba and other members of the government were dragged outside of the parliament building and forced to knee by the Abkhaz/North Caucasian militants. Berulava is not seen on the video, though according to the testimony of his friends, he refused to surrender and always kept a bullet and a F1 grenade in case of his capture (He was already captured by Abkhazian forces at the beginning of conflict and was tortured in Gudauta).

All captured members of the government including Berulava were murdered by the Abkhaz militants.

== Honors ==
The President of Georgia Giorgi Margvelashvili awarded Alexander Berulava with the Vakhtang Gorgasali Order first grade for his courage and heroism in the fight for the protection of the homeland and its territorial integrity.
