= Giorgi Baramia =

Georgian diplomat and politician

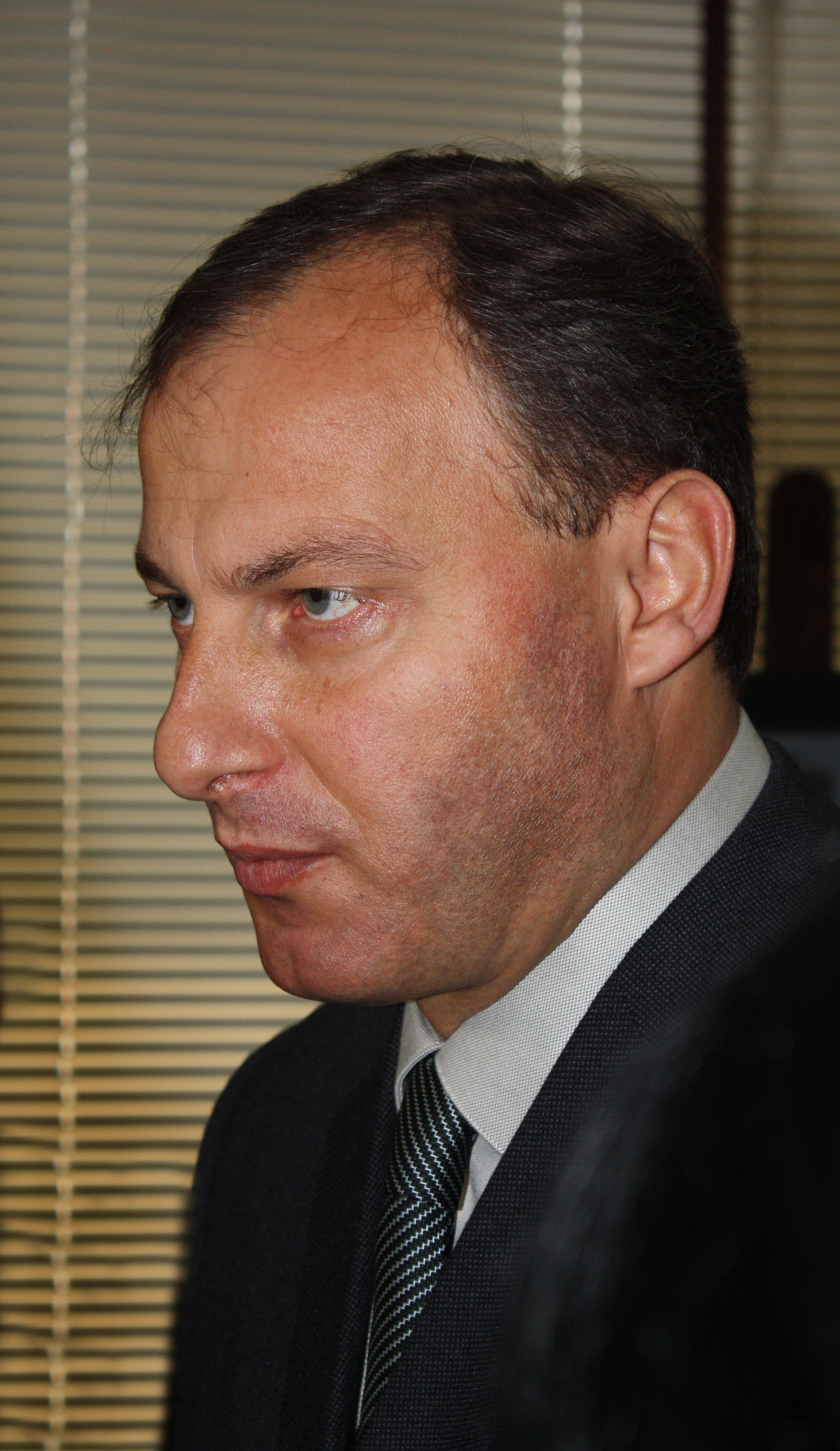
Giorgi Baramia

Giorgi Baramia (Georgian: გიორგი ბარამია) (born 25 February 1966) is a Georgian diplomat and the chairman of the Government of the Autonomous Republic of Abkhazia (-in exile) from June 15, 2009 to April 5, 2013.

Born in Sukhumi, Abkhaz ASSR, Georgian SSR, Baramia graduated from the Institute of Subtropical Agriculture of Georgia in 1987 and worked as an agronomist and later as a tax official in Abkhazia from 1988 to 1993. The secessionist war in Abkhazia forced him to leave his homeland in 1993. He worked for the Abkhaz government-in-exile and for Georgia's Ministry of Foreign Affairs from 1996 to 2009, including being a consul in Thessaloniki, Greece (2007–2009). In June 2009, he was elected a chairman of the Tbilisi-based Abkhazian government-in-exile, succeeding on this post Malkhaz Akishbaia. He resigned from his position on April 5, 2013.
