= Anti-Georgian sentiment =

Dislike, hatred, or persecution of Georgians

Anti-Georgian sentiment, also known as Kartvelophobia, refers to the dislike, hatred, discrimination, or persecution of Georgians, the country of Georgia, or Georgian culture. Anti-Georgian sentiment has taken root mainly in Russia, and partly in Turkey.

== Abkhazia ==
Anti-Georgian and anti-Soviet riots took place in Abkhazia during the Soviet period in 1957, 1967, and 1979. Reports of these incidents were largely suppressed until the late 1980s.

During the 1992–93 war the ethnic Georgians were victims of ethnic cleansing by the Abkhaz separatist government.

== Armenia ==
According to a July 2007 poll in Armenia, Georgia was viewed as a political and economic threat by 12% of respondents, while 9% viewed it as an important partner. According to a 2013 poll, a majority of respondents opposed women marrying Georgians (70% disapproving vs 29% approving). In contrast, a majority approved doing business with Georgians (67% vs 31%).

== Azerbaijan ==
According to a 2013 poll, a majority of respondents in Azerbaijan opposed women marrying Georgians (94% disapproving vs 5% approving). In contrast, a majority approved doing business with Georgians (78% vs 20%).

== Iran ==
The statue of word Allah made by Iranian Georgians from the Georgian Mkhedruli letters was to be installed in a square in Fereydunshahr, Iran. On the first installation attempt, the statue was not installed because of opposition from the Lurs. 120 days later, it was installed, but only for a few hours at night, then taken down and moved out of the city.

== Russia ==
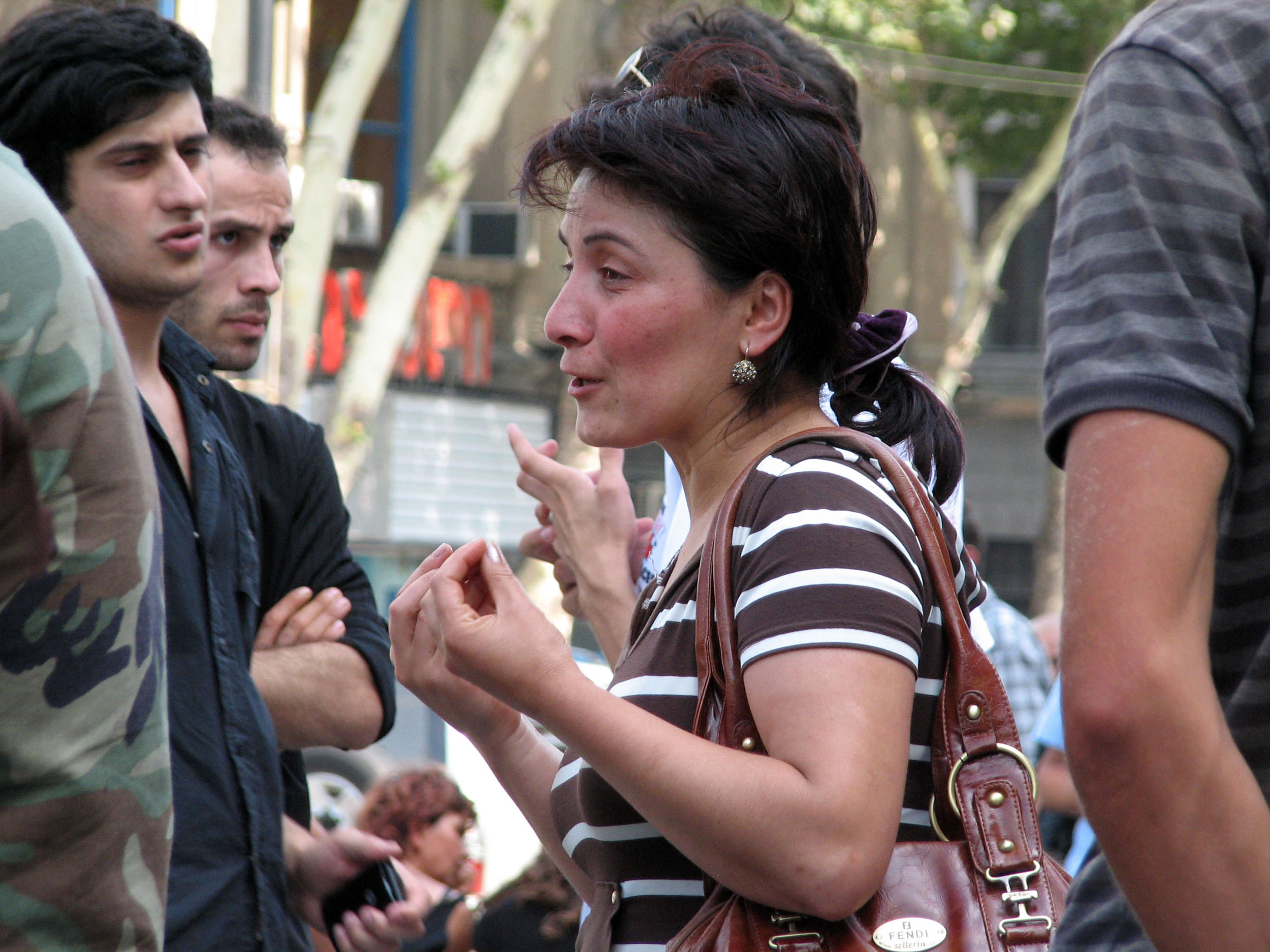
Georgian refugees from South Ossetia asking for help outside the Georgian parliament in Tbilisi.

According to the Russian-based human rights center Memorial as of 2006 "Georgian citizens or just ethnic Georgian are subject to unlawful mass checks of observance of regime of sojourn" in Russia. The atmosphere of fear for Georgians in Russia was "supported by a lot of anti-Georgian materials in mass media, first of all on TV."

Russian television stations actively supported and justified the government’s singling out of Georgians through daily news programs as well as weekly analytic and political programming and special series. For example, one-sided news coverage in early October on the government-owned Channel One exclusively presented the position of government officials and agencies and regularly connected Georgians to violations of the law, including organized crime. — "Singled Out: Russia's Detention and Expulsion of Georgians" (PDF). Human Rights Watch. 19 (5(D)): 34–35. 2007.

It especially intensified during and after the Russo-Georgian War of 2008. In the months following the war, discrimination against Georgian residents in Russia ran high. Svante Cornell and S. Frederick Starr described the situation as follows:

Police, tax, fire, and other inspection teams were sent to the cafés, restaurants, hotels, entertainment centers, and other enterprises belonging to ethnic Georgians in Russia. Scheduled Georgian cultural performances were cancelled. Taxi drivers were encouraged to request identification from their passengers and refuse service if they turned out to be Georgians. And a massive anti-Georgian propaganda campaign unfolded in the Russian mass media.

By early October 2008, the "anti-Georgian campaign had turned into a full-scale witch hunt". Sanctions against Georgia were passed by the State Duma, while visas for Georgian citizens were shortened by half. Temur Iakobashvili, Georgia's State Minister for Reintegration, accused Russia of financially backing an anti-Georgian campaign in the Western media. After change of leadership in Georgia in 2012-2013, when Georgian Dream replaced Saakashvili's UNM, "Moscow’s anti-Georgian rhetoric has softened as the strong ideological opposition frequently raised by the previous Georgian government has disappeared, and Russia has lifted its previous embargoes on Georgian wines and mineral water."

In 2012, then-Prime Minister Vladimir Putin, at a dinner with journalists, said that Boris Akunin, a popular fiction writer in Russia, supports the Russian opposition just because "he's an ethnic Georgian".

In August 2008 opposition activist Alexei Navalny referred to Georgians as "rodents." Navalny later apologized, but said that "he stands by the other positions he took at that time."

== South Ossetia ==
During 2008 Russo-Georgian war, ethnic cleansing of Georgians in South Ossetia was conducted by the South Ossetian separatists and Russian forces.
