= Geno Adamia =

Georgian military commander

Geno Adamia (Georgian: გენო ადამია; 8 March 1936 – 28 September 1993) was a Georgian military commander who was killed during the war in Abkhazia, Georgia.

A native of Senaki, he engaged, immediately after the outbreak of the hostilities in 1992, in the struggle with the Abkhaz separatists who fought for the secession of Georgia's autonomous republic of Abkhazia, where the Georgians constituted 45.7% of the population. Adamia organized a large volunteer detachment of the citizens of Sukhumi and was actively involved in the defence of the city against the combined Abkhaz-North Caucasian forces aided by the Russian navy and aviation. He was soon promoted to Major General and appointed the commander of the 23rd Mechanized Brigade of the Ministry of Defence of Georgia. One of the most energetic and popular Georgian commanders, he refused to surrender when Sukhumi fell on 27 September 1993. With a tiny force, he continued to fight in the vicinities of Sukhumi and trying to organize a counterattack on the seized Sukhumi, he was killed in the action at the Kelasuri Bridge on 28 September.

Adamia's friends ransomed his body which was buried in Tbilisi, the capital of Georgia, in November 1993. The Georgian society, especially the IDPs from Abkhazia, marked the 70th anniversary of his birth on 8 March 2006. On 27 September 2020, he was awarded the Order of the National Hero of Georgia.
