= Zhiuli Shartava =

Georgian politician (1944–1993)

- ჟიული შარტავა
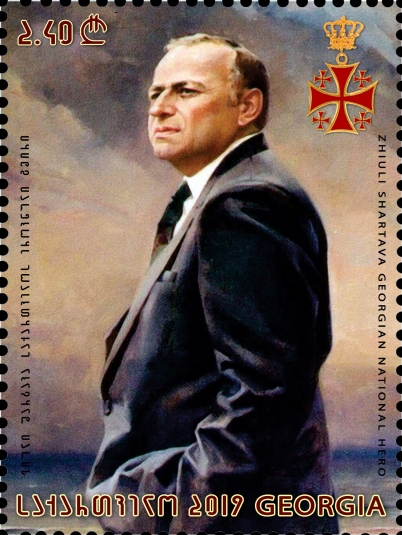
- 2019 stamp

Chairman of the Government of the Autonomous Republic of Abkhazia
- In office July 18, 1993 – September 27, 1993
- President: Eduard Shevardnadze
- Preceded by: Tamaz Nadareishvili

Head of the Council of Self-Defence of Autonomous Republic of Abkhazia
- In office 1992–1993
- President: Eduard Shevardnadze

Personal details
- Born: March 7, 1944 Senaki, Georgian SSR, Soviet Union
- Died: September 27, 1993 (aged 49) Sukhumi, Abkhazia, Georgia

Zhiuli Shartava (Georgian: ჟიული შარტავა; March 7, 1944 – September 27, 1993) was a Georgian politician and National Hero who served as the Head of the Government of the Autonomous Republic of Abkhazia and was killed by Abkhaz militants during the ethnic cleansing of Georgians in Abkhazia in 1993.

== Biography ==
Shartava was born on March 7, 1944, in Senaki, Georgian SSR. An engineer by education, he was elected to the Parliament of Georgia in 1992. Shartava chaired the Council of Ministers and the Council of Self-Defence of Autonomous Republic of Abkhazia during the Georgian-Abkhazian War in 1993. When the city of Sukhumi fell to the Abkhazian separatist forces on September 27, 1993, Shartava with other members of the Abkhaz Government (Guram Gabiskiria, Raul Eshba, Alexander Berulava, Mamia Alasania, Sumbat Saakian, Misha Kokaia and others) refused to flee and were captured by the Abkhaz militants. Initially they were promised safety, however Shartava and others from the Council of Ministers were killed by the militants and according to UN report Shartava was tortured. In 2005, American journalist Malcolm Linton displayed his photo materials taken during the war in Abkhazia at the art gallery in Tbilisi, where Shartava's body was identified among the pile of corpses, clearly visible on one of the photographs. On video materials taken during the capture of Sukhumi by the militants, Shartava is carried out from the Government building and physically assaulted, after which he was forced into the van and taken to the outskirts of Sukhumi where he was killed with other Georgian and Abkhaz members of the government and their staff. Shartava's body was handed over to the Georgian side and was buried in the western Georgian city of Senaki. In 2004, Shartava was posthumously honored as a National Hero of Georgia.

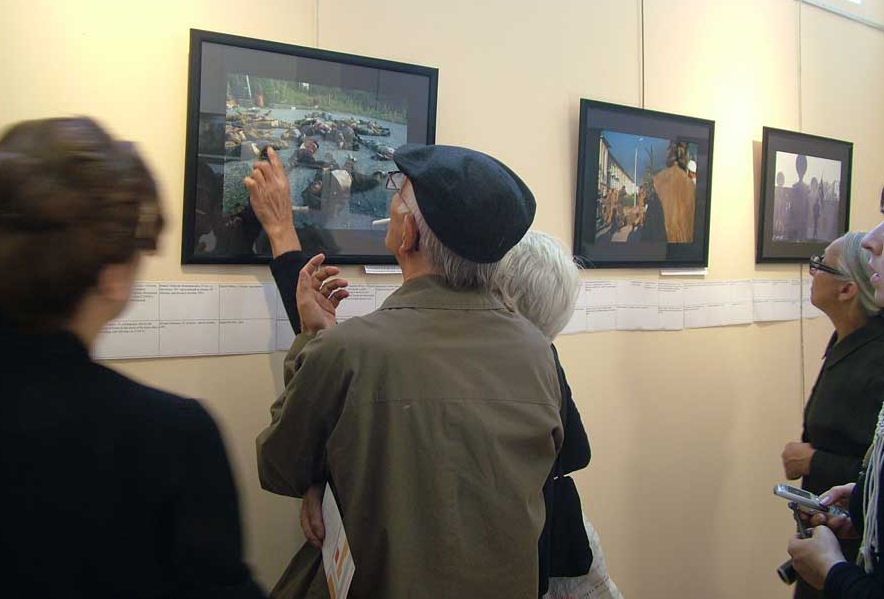
Malcolm Lintons Photo gallery in Tbilisi where Shartavas body was identified among the piles of corpses on the photograph.

== See also ==
- Ethnic cleansing of Georgians in Abkhazia
- Sukhumi Massacre
