= Tamaz Nadareishvili =

Georgian politician

Tamaz Nadareishvili (Georgian: თამაზ ნადარეიშვილი; 19 July 1954 – 31 August 2004) was a Georgian politician who served as head of the Council of Ministers of Abkhazia, a government-in-exile for the province.

== Early life ==
Nadareishvili was a great grandson of the famous Abkhaz prince Shervashidze. He was born and raised in Sukhumi. Nadareishvili attended the Tbilisi Military Academy and then the Sukhumi University, graduatuating from the latter in 1981. Afterwards, he worked as an instructor of the State Security Committee and was head of a department.

== Political career ==
During the break-up of the Soviet Union, Nadareishvili became involved in Georgian National Liberation movement. After the war in Abkhazia, Nadareishvili was elected by fellow Georgian refugees as the head of an exile government. In the 1990s he served at times in the Georgian parliament, continuing to draw support from refugees, to whom he helped distribute government aid.

As head of the Council, Nadareishvili loudly supported military action to retake Abkhazia. Allegations were made claiming him being involved in paramilitary operations on the Abkhaz/Georgia administrative border. The Forest Brothers under Dato Shengelia and the White Legion under Zurab Samushia were both allegedly associated with the Supreme Council.

Nadareishvili remained neutral during the Rose Revolution that ousted Eduard Shevardnadze in favor of Mikhail Saakashvili. However, Nadareishvili soon faced a revolt of his own, and resigned in January 2004 after a vote of no confidence by the Supreme Council. In 2005 he published a book ("Conspiracy Against Georgia"), which mostly includes information about ethnic cleansing and genocide of Georgian population in Abkhazia.

Nadareishvili died of a heart attack on August 31, 2004.
