= Forest Brothers (Georgia) =

Ethnic Georgian guerilla group in Abkhazia

The Forest Brothers (Georgian: ტყის ძმები, tq'is dz'mebi) were a guerrilla group consisting mostly of ethnic Georgians who remained in the breakaway republic of Abkhazia after the Georgian regular army's defeat in the War in Abkhazia (1992–1993) and resisted the ethnic cleansing of Georgians in the disputed territory.

The group, along with another guerrilla group called the White Legion, continued low-intensity guerrilla war against Abkhaz forces along the ceasefire line in the late 1990s and the early 2000s. According to the Georgian Interior Ministry, under the cover of its guerrilla warfare, the Forest Brothers engaged in kidnappings, smuggling and other crimes.

The Forest Brothers were led by Dato Shengelia, who disbanded the group after Mikheil Saakashvili was elected President of Georgia in January 2004. On 4 February, the police arrested a large number of Forest Brothers in Zugdidi. On 11 February, Shengelia declared that he had reached an agreement with Interior Minister Giorgi Baramidze to lay down his arms.

In December 2006, Shengalia was arrested for the possession of heroin and methadone, and was convicted to 24 years of imprisonment. However, he was released in 2010 on account of bad health. On 22 February 2011, the Abkhazian delegation at the 25th meeting on incident prevention in Chuburkhinji questioned his release and demanded his extradition from the Georgian side for various serious crimes.

== In popular culture ==
The 1995 novel Our Game by John le Carré features a group of Ossetian mercenaries known as "The Forest," which may have been based on the Forest Brothers.
