= White Legion =

Georgian guerrilla group

The White Legion (Georgian: თეთრი ლეგიონი, t'et'ri legioni) was a guerrilla group consisting mostly of ethnic Georgians who remained in Abkhazia after the Georgian regular army's defeat in the War in Abkhazia (1992–1993).

The group, along with another guerrilla group called the Forest Brothers, continued low-intensity guerrilla war against Abkhaz forces along the ceasefire line in the late 1990s and early 2000s.

The White Legion was led by Zurab Samushia.
