= Guram Gabeskiria =

Georgian politician; mayor of Sukhumi (1947–1993)

- გურამ გაბესკირია
- Gabeskiria in 1988

Mayor of Sukhumi
- In office 15 January 1992 – 27 September 1993
- Succeeded by: Nodar Khashba

Personal details
- Born: 2 March 1947 Sukhumi, Abkhazian ASSR, Georgian SSR, Soviet Union
- Died: 27 September 1993 (aged 46) Sukhumi, Abkhazia, Georgia
- Cause of death: Execution
Association football career
Senior career*
Years	Team	Apps	(Gls)
1966	FC Shakhter Torez		
1967–1968	Dinamo Sukhumi		
1969–1970	Narzan Kislovodsk		
1970–1973	Dinamo Sukhumi		
1974	Khimik Grodno	7	(3)
1974	Guria Lanchkhuti	12	(6)
- * Club domestic league appearances and goals

Guram Gabeskiria (Georgian: გურამ გაბესკირია; 2 March 1947 – 27 September 1993) was a Georgian politician who served as mayor of Sukhumi. He was murdered by separatists during the ethnic cleansing of Georgians in Abkhazia in 1993.

== Biography ==
Guram Gabeskiria was born on 2 March 1947 in Sukhumi, Georgian SSR. Gabiskia graduated from the State University of M. Gorki with a degree in history and excelled as a soccer player. He played for the Dinamo Sukhumi in the late 1960s and later continued his career in Stavropol, Minsk and Kislovodsk before joining CSKA (Tbilisi). In 1972, he became a soccer referee of republican level and two years later upgraded himself to the union level soccer referee. As a result of political tensions in the USSR in 1989 all the Georgian teams except for Dinamo Sukhumi left the Soviet championship. Gabeskiria helped to create Sukhumi-based Tskhumi soccer club (which played in the newly formed Georgian football league) where he served as a president. In 1990 he was a candidate in the elections for the parliament of Abkhazian Autonomous Republic but gave up his claims in favour of Tamaz Nadareishvili.

Gabeskiria became a mayor of Sukhumi in 1992 and joined the Council of Ministers and the Council of Self-Defense of Abkhazian Autonomous Republic during the Georgian-Abkhazian War in 1993. When the city of Sukhumi fell to the Abkhaz separatists on 27 September 1993, Gabeskiria along with other authorities from the Government of Abkhazian Autonomous Republic (Zhiuli Shartava, Raul Eshba, Mamia Alasania, and others) refused to leave the besieged city and was captured by Abkhaz militants and North Caucasian mercenaries. Based on video materials, Human rights documents and witness accounts of the event, G. Gabeskiria, Z. Shartava, R. Eshba and other members of the government were dragged outside of the parliament building and forced to kneel by the Abkhaz/North Caucasian militants. Gabeskiria refused to do so by replying in Russian: "Never in my life!" ("Никогда в жизни!").

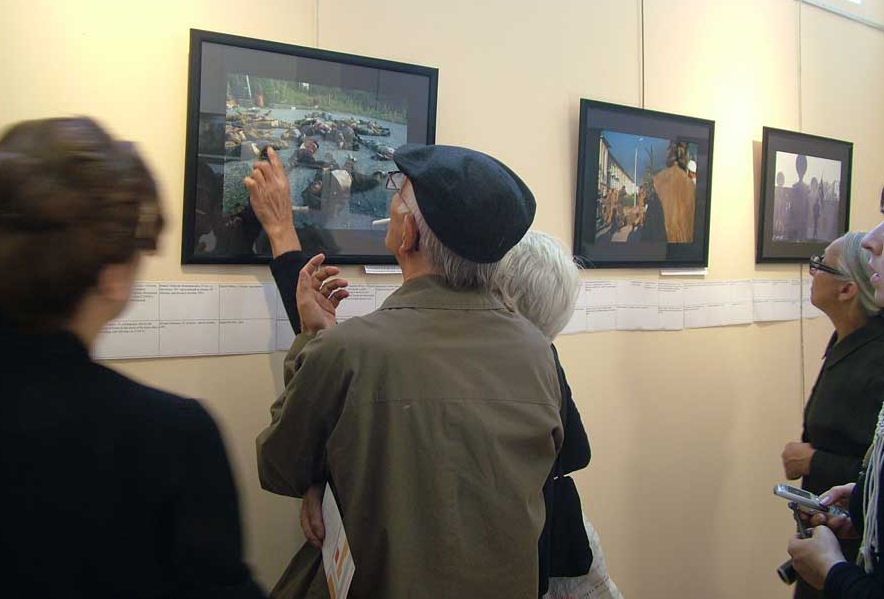
Malcolm Linton's photo gallery in Tbilisi, where Gabeskiria's body was identified among the piles of corpses on the photograph.

All captured members of the government including Gabeskiria were murdered by the Abkhaz militants. They were all executed without trial. In 2005, American journalist Malcolm Linton displayed his photo materials taken during the war in Abkhazia at the art gallery in Tbilisi, where Gabeskiria's son Vladimir Gabeskiria identified his father among the pile of corpses (along with Zhiuli Shartava and other members of the government), clearly visible on one of the photographs.

On 27 September 2017, Gabeskiria was posthumously awarded by President Giorgi Margvelashvili the title and Order of National Hero. His remains were uncovered and interred with military honors in Tbilisi in October 2017.

On 31 October 2019, in Georgia Today, Tbilisi mayor Kakha Kaladze was reported to have announced that Gabeskiria will be honored with a statue in Tbilisi, alongside Zhiuli Shartava.
