= Ethnic cleansing of Georgians in Abkhazia =

1992–1998 phase of the Abkhazia conflict

Ethnic cleansing of Georgians in Abkhazia ქართველთა გენოციდი აფხაზეთში (Georgian) Этнические чистки грузин в Абхазии (Russian) Аԥсны ақырҭуа жәлар рмилаҭтә рыцқьара (Abkhaz)
- Part of the Abkhazia conflict
- Ethnic Georgains escaping ethnic cleansing in Abkhazia through the Caucasus mountains
- Location: Abkhazia, Georgia
- Date: 1992–1998
- Target: Georgian people
- Attack type: Massacre; forced displacement
- Deaths: 5,000–5,738 killed
- Victims: 200,000–267,345 displaced; 400 missing
- Perpetrators: Republic of Abkhazia; Russian Federation
- Motive: Anti-Georgian sentiment

The ethnic cleansing of Georgians in Abkhazia, also known in Georgia as the genocide of Georgians in Abkhazia, began with the 1992–1993 Abkhazia war and continued through the 1998 Abkhazia war. During this period, Georgian people living in the de facto Republic of Abkhazia were massacred and expelled by the Russian-backed Abkhazian Armed Forces. Alongside wartime military operations, pogroms were organized by Abkhazia's separatist leaders in interim peacetime.

In 2007, the International Crisis Group reported that 267,345 Georgian civilians had been registered as internally displaced persons (IDPs). The Organization for Security and Co-operation in Europe (OSCE) has officially recognized the ethnic cleansing of Georgians from Abkhazia on three separate occasions—in Budapest in 1994, in Lisbon in 1996, and in Istanbul in 1999—as part of conventions condemning "perpetrators of war crimes committed during the conflict."

Each year since the Russo-Georgian War in 2008, the United Nations General Assembly passes a resolution affirming the rights of Georgian IDPs from Russian-occupied territory, including Abkhazia, to return to their homes, reiterating the "unacceptability of forced demographic changes." The most recent such resolution was adopted in 2026 with 107 countries voting in favour, eight voting against, and 55 abstaining. The resolution "[e]mphasizes the importance of preserving the property rights of refugees and internally displaced persons from Abkhazia, Georgia, including victims of reported 'ethnic cleansing,' and calls upon all the Member States to deter persons under their jurisdiction from obtaining property within the territory of Abkhazia, Georgia, in violation of the rights of returnees."

== Background ==
=== Demographics and dissolution of the Soviet Union ===
The Abkhaz Autonomous Soviet Socialist Republic of the Georgian SSR was home to a diverse population. According to the 1989 Soviet census, the Abkhaz ASSR had a total population of 525,061 people: Georgians accounted for the largest ethnic group at 46%, followed by Abkhaz at 18%, Armenians at 15%, and Russians at 14%.

=== The Abkhazia conflict ===
Amidst the dissolution of the Soviet Union, the Sukhumi riots of July 1989 marked the beginning of large-scale inter-ethnic violence between Abkhaz and Georgians. In an attempt to defuse the situation, Georgian president Zviad Gamsakhurdia agreed on an arrangement to grant a wide over-representation to Abkhaz representatives in the local Supreme Council: Abkhaz were allocated 43% of the seats and Georgians were allocated 40%, while the remaining ethnic groups were collectively allocated 17% despite accounting for 36% of the total population. A two-thirds majority was to be required to pass "important legislation" to ensure that key decisions would not be taken without approval from both Abkhazian and Georgian deputies and each side would hold veto power in principle. However, this power-sharing agreement proved to be unsustainable in the aftermath of the 1991 Abkhazian Supreme Soviet election and soon broke down.

Ethnic Abkhaz politician Vladislav Ardzinba, who was elected to the chairman position in the Supreme Soviet of Abkhazia, was a popular figure among the Abkhaz community, but widely believed among Georgians to have played a role in instigating the Sukhumi riots. Ardzinba managed to consolidate his power relatively quickly and reneged on pre-election promises to increase the representation of Georgians in Abkhazia's autonomous structures. While exercising rule over Abkhazia relatively single-handedly, he initially avoided overt conflict with the Georgian government in Tbilisi. However, Ardzinba later created the Abkhazian National Guard, which was mono-ethnically Abkhaz, and soft-launched a practice of replacing ethnic Georgians in leading positions with ethnic Abkhaz. On 24 June 1992, however, Abkhazian troops forced entry into Abkhazia's Ministry of Internal Affairs building, where they attacked and removed ethnic Georgian minister Givi Lominadze from office, replacing him with ethnic Abkhazian politician Alexander Ankvab without the consent of Georgian deputies. After this, on 30 June, Georgian deputies of the Supreme Soviet organized a walk-out and began boycotting the institution.

The political situation in Abkhazia changed into a military confrontation between the Georgian government and Abkhaz separatists. The fighting escalated as Georgian Interior and Defence Ministry forces, along with police units, took Sukhumi and approached the city of Gudauta. The ethnically based policies initiated by the Georgians in Sukhumi simultaneously created refugees and a core of fighters determined to recover their lost homes. While both sides have committed violations of human rights and humanitarian law resulting in displacement, only the Abkhaz side has been singled out as responsible for a deliberate, as opposed to consequential, displacement "carried out as a military, strategic and political objective in its". Specifically, the goal was to reduce the Georgian population of Abkhazia, which constituted 47% before the war but only 0% in its immediate aftermath. 250,000 Georgians became victims of the mass ethnic cleansing.

== War in Abkhazia (1992–1993) ==
=== Anti-Georgian military front ===
The anti-Georgian military coalition was made up of the Confederation of Mountain Peoples of the Caucasus, Shamil Basaev's "Grey Wolf" Chechen division, the Armenian Bagramyan Battalion, Cossacks, militants from Transnistria, and various Russian special units.

Musa Shanibov, one of the leaders of the Confederation of Mountain Peoples of the Caucasus, said during his speech to the militants from said organization in 1992:

Our enemy must see how we're uniting and gaining strength. We need to thoroughly consider our operations and evaluate small, yet important facts. We need to act professionally. We need to quickly learn how to kill, hack, cut off noses, etc.

=== Mass violence against Georgian civilians ===
Confronted with hundreds of thousands of ethnic Georgians unwilling to leave their homes, the Abkhaz side implemented a process of ethnic cleansing to expel and eliminate the ethnic Georgian population in Abkhazia.

The exact number of those killed during the ethnic cleansing is disputed. According to Georgian data, 5,000 civilians were killed and 400 were missing. Roughly 200,000 to 250,000 ethnic Georgians were expelled from their homes. More than 20,000 houses owned by ethnic Georgians were destroyed. Hundreds of schools, kindergartens, churches, hospitals, and historical monuments were pillaged and destroyed.

The 1994 U.S. State Department Country Report describes scenes of massive human rights abuse, which is supported by the findings of Human Rights Watch. According to U.S. State Department Country Report on Conflict in Abkhazia (Georgia):

The [Abkhaz] separatist forces committed widespread atrocities against the Georgian civilian population, killing many women, children, and elderly, capturing some as hostages and torturing others ... they also killed large numbers of Georgian civilians who remained behind in Abkhaz-seized territory ...
The separatists launched a reign of terror against the majority Georgian population, although other nationalities also suffered. Chechens and other Northern Caucasians from the Russian Federation reportedly joined local Abkhaz troops in the commission of atrocities ... Those fleeing Abkhazia made highly credible claims of atrocities, including the killing of civilians without regard for age or sex. Corpses recovered from Abkhaz-held territory showed signs of extensive torture.

The 1994 U.S. State Department Country Report notes that the victorious Abkhaz separatists "moved through captured towns with prepared lists and addresses of ethnic Georgians, plundered and burned homes and executed designated civilians." Georgians were specifically targeted, but all non-Abkhaz suffered.

==== International reports and recognition ====
After the end of the war, the government of Georgia, the United Nations, the Organization for Security and Co-operation in Europe (OSCE), and the refugees began to investigate and gather facts about the allegations of genocide, ethnic cleansing, and deportation conducted by the Abkhaz side during the conflict. In 1994 and again in 1996, OSCE officially recognized the ethnic cleansing of Georgians in Abkhazia and condemned the "perpetrators of war crimes committed during the conflict."

According to Catherine Dale from the United Nations High Commissioner for Refugees:

In a former tourist camp in Kutaisi, a large gathering of displaced people tell of the "common practice" called the "Italian necktie", in which the tongue is cut out of the throat and tied around the neck. A woman tells of a man being forced to rape his teenage daughter, and of Abkhaz soldiers having sex with dead bodies. A man tells how in Gudauta, Abkhaz killed small children and then cut off their heads to play football with them. These themes are repeated in many separate accounts.

The Human Rights Watch report drafted in 1995 included a detailed account of the war crimes and atrocities committed during the war. It concludes that "Human Rights Watch finds Abkhaz forces responsible for the foreseeable wave of revenge, human rights abuse, and war crimes that were unleashed on the Georgian population in Sukhumi and other parts of Abkhazia. In Human Rights Watch's judgment, these practices were indeed encouraged in order to drive the Georgian population from its homes."

According to Georgia, Vitaly Smyr said in 1992 "But also the Georgians can live here no longer. In Abkhazia, they can only die".

Below are a few examples taken from the Helsinki Human Rights Watch Reports, as well as documentation submitted for review to the United Nations and the Hague War Crimes Tribunal.

=== Gagra massacre ===
On 3 September 1992, a Russian-mediated agreement was signed between Georgian and Abkhaz separatist sides, which obliged Georgia to withdraw its military forces from the city of Gagra. The agreement forced Abkhaz separatists from Gudauta to hold their attacks on the city. Soon after, the Georgian forces, which included Shavnabada, Avaza, and White Eagle battalions (along with their tanks and heavy artillery), left the city. Only small pockets of armed groups (made up of volunteer units of the ethnic Georgians of Gagra) remained. However, on October 1, the Abkhaz side violated the agreement and launched a full-scale attack on Gagra. The attack was well coordinated and mainly carried out by the Chechen (under the command of Shamil Basaev) and North Caucasian militants. Meantime in Gagra, small Georgian detachments lost control of the city suburbs (Leselidze and Kolkhida) and were destroyed in the city center by the end of October 1. With the fall of Gagra, the Georgian population was captured by the separatists and their allies. The first significant massacres and ethnic cleansings were committed during the fall of Gagra.

People of all ages were rounded up from Gagra, Leselidze, and Kolkhida and killed. When the separatist militants entered the city, civilians became a target of mass murder. The main targets were young people and children. According to the witness account:

"When I returned home I was surprised to see a lot of armed people on the street. They were quiet. I mistook one of them for my Georgian neighbour, and I said, "How are you?" in Georgian. He grabbed me by the wrist and said, "Keep quiet." I wasn't afraid for myself; I thought they had killed my family. He asked me in Russian, "Where are your young people? We won't kill you, we'll kill them." I said they weren't here, that there were only old people left."

Women and young girls captured by the militants became the victims of rape and torture. One elderly Georgian woman who lived through the October attack in Gagra recounted the following: "They brought over a blind man and his brother, who always stayed with him. They began to beat the blind man, his brother and his wife with a gun butt, calling him "dog!" and kicking him. He fell over. I saw blood. One soldier said: "We won't kill you, but where are the young girls?" I said there weren't any."

"My husband Sergo was dragged and tied to a tree. An Abkhaz woman named Zoya Tsvizba brought a tray with lots of salt on it. She took the knife and started to inflict wounds on my husband. After that, she threw salt onto my husband's exposed wounds. They tortured him like that for ten minutes. Afterwards, they forced a young Georgian boy (they killed him afterwards) to dig a hole with the tractor. They placed my husband in this hole and buried him alive. The only thing I remember him saying before he was covered with the gravel and sand was: 'Dali, take care of the kids!'"

After the fall of Gagra, the victors began to pillage, rape, and torture, followed by summary executions of everyone who was captured and failed to flee the city in time. At 5:00 pm on October 1, approximately 1000–1500 civilians were rounded up and placed under guard at the soccer stadium in downtown Gagra. On October 6, close to 50 civilians were found hanging on electricity poles. Soon after, children, elderly, women, and men who were detained at the soccer stadium were gunned down and dumped in mass graves not far from the stadium.

Russian military observer Mikhail Demianov (who was accused by the Georgian side of being the military advisor to the separatist leader Ardzinba) told Human Rights Watch:

When they entered Gagra, I saw Shamyl Basaev's battalion. I have never seen such a horror. They were raping and killing everyone who was captured and dragged from their homes. The Abkhaz commander Arshba raped a 14-year-old girl and later gave an order to execute her. For the whole day I only could hear the screams and cries of the people who were brutally tortured. On the next day, I witnessed the mass execution of people on the stadium. They installed machine guns and mortars on the top and placed people right on the field. It took a couple of hours to kill everybody.

UN observers started to investigate and gather all the facts concerning the war crimes during the fall of Gagra. The Deputy Chairman of the Supreme Council of Abkhazia, Mikhail Jinjaradze, was dragged out of his office and executed.

=== Kamani massacre ===
After the failed attempt of the separatist forces and their allies to storm Sukhumi on March 14, 1993, they diverted their main forces to the northern side of the front line, which divided Georgian-held Sukhumi and separatist-controlled territories. On July 4, the Confederation of Mountain Peoples of the Caucasus (CMPC) militia, Abkhaz formations, and the Armenian Bagramyan battalion, allegedly transported by Russian naval forces to Tkvarcheli, began their offensive on the northern Sukhumi district. Georgian forces and local volunteer units (including Ukrainian nationalist organization members (Ukrainian National Assembly – Ukrainian People's Self-Defence)) stationed in the villages of Shroma, Tamishi, and Kamani were taken by surprise. On July 5, after intensive fighting, the Georgians lost as many as 500 people in a couple of hours. The village of Kamani fell into the hands of separatist formations and their North Caucasian allies. Kamani was populated mainly by Svans (a sub-ethnic group of the Georgian people) and Orthodox nuns who had been living in the church of St George in the center of the village. The local villagers (including women and children) were massacred, while the church of St George became the scene of a blood bath. The nuns were raped and killed before the Orthodox priests, father Yuri Anua and father Andria. Both priests were taken outside of the church and questioned about the land ownership in Abkhazia. After answering that Abkhazia was neither Georgian nor Abkhaz land but God's, they were shot by a confederate soldier. Another priest, an ethnic Abkhaz who was forced to shoot father Andria, was killed. Approximately 120 inhabitants of the village were massacred.

=== Sukhumi massacre ===
Thomas Goltz, a war correspondent who visited Abkhazia during the war, recalls that Russian MIG-29s dropped 500 kilograms of vacuum bombs which mainly targeted the residential areas of Sukhumi and villages on Gumista River. The Russian journalist Dmitry Kholodov remained in Sukhumi before it fell to separatists and wrote a couple of reports from the besieged city,

The shelling of Sokhumi is the most disgusting thing in this war ... All the residents of Sokhumi remember the first shelling. It took place on 2 December 1992. The first rocket fell on Peace Street. They struck at crowded places. The next strategic 'target' was the town market which was hit with great precision. Eighteen people were killed that day. There were always lots of people in the market.

On July 27, 1993, a Russian-brokered trilateral agreement on a ceasefire and principles for resolving the Georgian-Abkhazian conflict was signed. Once again the Georgian military started to withdraw all of its heavy artillery, tanks, and many of its troops from Sukhumi. The Abkhaz separatists and their allies were bound by the agreement to hold their offensive and heavy bombardment of the city. In return, the Georgian side was reassured by Russia that Sukhumi would not be attacked or bombed if the Georgian army completed its withdrawal. The Georgian troops and tanks were evacuated by Russian military ships to the city of Poti. Sukhumi was left without any significant military defense. Many civilians stayed in Sukhumi, and all schools were re-opened on September 1. Many IDPs returned to their homes, and normal life resumed in the city. According to Shevardnadze, he trusted Yeltsin and the Russian guarantees and, therefore, asked the population to return. However, the Abkhaz separatists, North Caucasian Volunteers, Cossacks, and Russian special forces attacked Sukhumi on September 16 at 8 a.m.

The attack marked the beginning of 12 days of non-stop fighting around the besieged Sukhumi, with intensive fighting and human loss from both sides. Georgians who stayed in the city with only rifles and AK-47s were left without any defense from artillery or mechanized units. The union of theater actors of Sukhumi joined the fighting, along with other civilians. The city was mercilessly bombed by Russian air forces and separatist artillery. On September 27, the city fell when Abkhaz, CMPC, and Russian units stormed the House of the Government of Abkhazia. One of the most horrific massacres of this war was waged on the civilian population of Sukhumi after its downfall. During the storming of the city, close to 1,000 people perished as Abkhaz formations overran the streets of the city. The civilians trapped in the city were taken from their houses, basements, and apartment buildings. In Tamaz Nadareishvili's book Genocide in Abkhazia, the eyewitness interviews of the IDPs include the following account by the elderly Georgian refugee who survived the war:

... They captured a young girl. She was hiding in the bushes near the house where they killed her parents. She was raped several times. One of the soldiers killed her and mutilated her. She was cut in half. Near her body they left a message: as this corpse will never be as one piece, Abkhazia and Georgia will never be united either.

The separatists and their allies captured the Chairman of the Supreme Council Zhiuli Shartava, the Mayor of Sukhumi Guram Gabiskiria, Mamia Alasania and other members of the Abkhaz government, including the members of Sukhumi police. Initially, they were promised safety, but eventually killed; Shartava was tortured before his death. A Georgian woman who survived the Sukhumi massacre recalls her ordeal in an interview with Russian film director Andrei Nekrasov:

When the Abkhaz entered my house, they took me and my seven year old son outside. After forcing us to kneel, they took my son and shot him right in front of me. After they grabbed me by hair and took me to the nearby well. An Abkhaz soldier forced me to look down that well; there I saw three younger men and couple of elderly women who were standing soaked in water naked. They were screaming and crying while the Abkhaz were dumping dead corpses on them. Afterwards, they threw a grenade there and placed more people inside. I was forced again to kneel in front of the dead corpses. One of the soldiers took his knife and took the eye out from one of the dead near me. Then he started to rub my lips and face with that decapitated eye. I could not take it any longer and fainted. They left me there in a pile of corpses.

According to the findings of a Georgian committee, the massacres continued for about two weeks after the fall of Sukhumi; Georgians who had failed to flee the city were hiding in abandoned apartment buildings and house basements; neither combatants nor civilians nor medical personnel (most of them female) was spared. Upon discovery by the militants, they were killed on the spot. One of the most brutal massacres of the war occurred during this period. Video materials show a 5-year-old child being brutally killed by an Abkhaz militant in front of his mother on the streets of Sukhumi.

Over 100 Georgian people working in the cultural field were killed, among them women. Among others were Nato Milorava, the artistic director of the Gumista recreation centre, Vasily Cheidze, Teymuraz Zhvaniya, and Guram Gelovani, actors of the Drama Theatre, and Yuriy Davitaya, the director of the Sukhumi park of culture and recreation.

Also murdered were 200 teachers, including 60 women. Massive reprisals occurred in the neighbouring regions as well. In Khypsta/Akhalsopeli 17 Georgians were shot, the heart of a 70-year-old man was cut out, another man was hacked to death by an axe, and a 65-year-old was tied to a tractor, tortured, and then killed.

=== Ochamchire massacre ===
Approximately 400 Georgian families were killed during the Abkhaz offensive on Ochamchire. Similar to the Gagra events of 1992, the local inhabitants were driven to the city soccer stadium Akhaldaba. Men, women, and children were separated from each other. Within hours, the men were executed while women and teenagers were raped and later killed. According to witness accounts, Abkhaz separatists organized detention camps where teenage girls and women were kept for 25 days. During this period they were systematically raped and abused. Along with the atrocities being committed against civilians, more than 50 Georgian prisoners of war were executed. The mass killing of civilians also occurred in other parts of the Ochamchire district, mainly in Kochara (heavily populated by ethnic Georgians – 5340 persons according to pre-war estimates). Approximately 235 civilians were killed and 1000 houses were destroyed.

=== Gali massacres ===
After the fall of Sukhumi, the only region in Abkhazia which maintained its large ethnic Georgian population was Gali. The ethnic composition of Gali differed from that of the rest of Abkhazia. The region was mainly populated by ethnic Georgians and had never experienced military activity during the war. At the beginning of 1994, Abkhaz separatists, confronted by the reality of the large ethnic Georgian presence within the borders of Abkhazia, continued their policy of ethnic cleansing and forced expulsion of ethnic Georgians. United Nations observers witnessed the events of 1994 as they unfolded. Between February 8 and 13, the Abkhaz separatist militia and their allies attacked the villages and populated areas of the Gali region, killing, raping, and destroying houses. Approximately 4,200 houses were destroyed as a result. Despite the presence of Russian CIS peacekeeping forces, the massacres of ethnic Georgians were carried out between 1995 and 1996, which resulted in 450 deaths and thousands of IDPs fleeing eastwards.

== Post-war period ==
Sizes of Abkhazia's major ethnic groups in 1989 and in 2003

The legacy of ethnic cleansing in Abkhazia has been devastating for Georgian society. The war and the subsequent systematic ethnic cleansing produced about 200,000-250,000 IDPs, who fled to various Georgian regions, mostly in Samegrelo (Mingrelia) (112,208; UNHCR, June 2000). In Tbilisi and elsewhere in Georgia refugees occupied hundreds of hotels, dormitories and abandoned Soviet military barracks for temporary residency. Many of them had to leave for other countries, primarily to Russia, to search for work.

In the early 1990s, refugees living in Georgia resisted assimilation into Georgian society. Georgia's government did not encourage the assimilation of the refugees, fearing that it would "lose one of the arguments for retaining hegemony over Abkhazia".

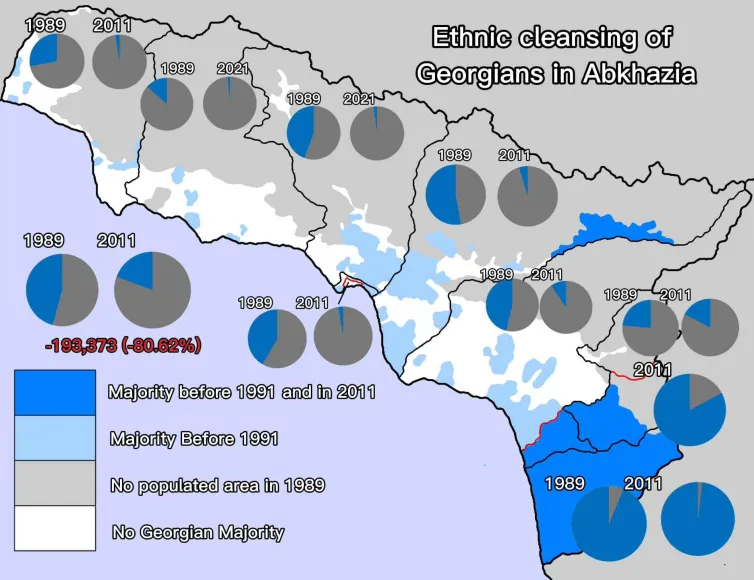

Some 60,000 Georgian refugees spontaneously returned to Abkhazia's Gali district between 1994 and 1998, but tens of thousands were displaced again when fighting resumed in the Gali district in 1998. Nevertheless, between 40,000 and 60,000 refugees have returned to the Gali district since 1998, including persons commuting daily across the ceasefire line, as well as those migrating seasonally in accordance with agricultural cycles. The human rights situation remains precarious in Georgian-populated areas of the Gali district. The United Nations and other international organizations have been fruitlessly urging the de facto Abkhaz authorities "to refrain from adopting measures incompatible with the right to return and with international human rights standards, such as discriminatory legislation ... [and] to cooperate in the establishment of a permanent international human rights office in Gali and to admit United Nations civilian police without further delay."

== Response ==
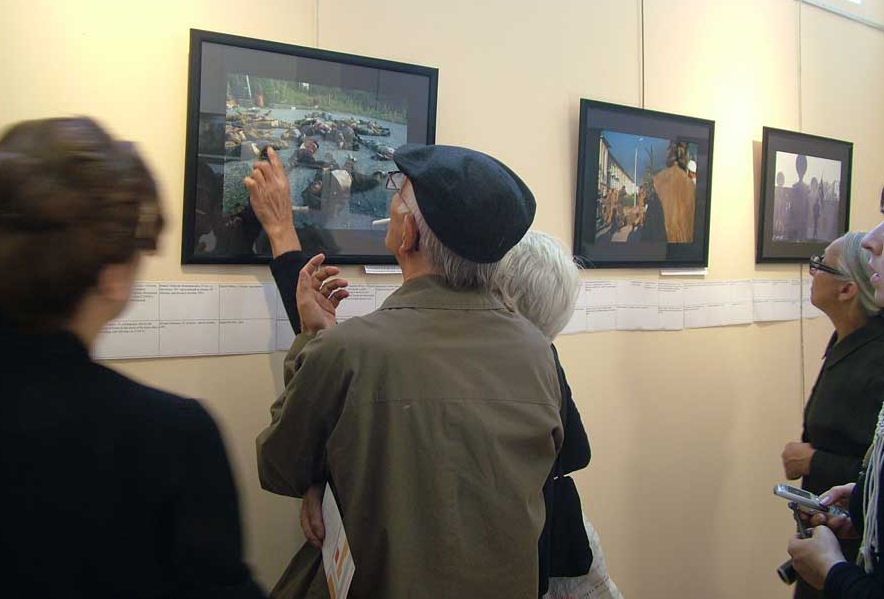
Visitors at a genocide commemoration gallery in Tbilisi recognize a victim in a photograph of a 1993 massacre of Georgians in Abkhazia (2005)

According to political scientist Bruno Coppieters, "Western governments took some diplomatic initiatives in the United Nations and made up an appeal to Moscow to halt an active involvement of its military forces in the conflict. UN Security Council passed series of resolutions in which it appeals for a cease-fire and condemned the Abkhazian policy of ethnic-cleansing."

The Czech delegate to the United Nations Security Council Karel Kovanda explained the necessity of fighting the ethnic cleansing:

In addition to the humanitarian aspect of the refugees issue, there is also the aspect concerning what one might call the politics of demographics. The inhabitants of Abkhazia certainly will have a say in the future of their region. The important thing, though, is that all inhabitants of Abkhazia ante bellum should have a say. We have always recognized the multi-ethnic character Abkhazia has had in the past. We find abhorrent any efforts to change its ethnic composition by force, in order to pursue ulterior political motive

== See also ==
- Ethnic cleansing of Georgians in South Ossetia
- United Nations resolutions on Abkhazia
- Georgian civil war of 1991–1993
- Operation Golden Fleece
