= 1989 Sukhumi riots =

Civil disorder in Sukhumi, Abkhazia, Georgia, Soviet Union

- Part of Georgian-Abkhaz conflict and Dissolution of the Soviet Union
- Date: July 1989
- Location: Sukhumi, Abkhaz ASSR; 43°00′12″N 41°00′55″E
- Caused by: Opening of a Tbilisi State University branch in Sukhumi
- Methods: Rioting, street fighting, looting, siege

Parties
(Abkhaz Autonomous Soviet Socialist Republic) Abkhaz civilians	(Georgian Soviet Socialist Republic) Georgian civilians	Soviet police

Casualties
- Deaths: 18
- Injuries: 448

The Sukhumi riot was a riot in Sukhumi, Abkhaz Autonomous Soviet Socialist Republic, Georgian Soviet Socialist Republic, Soviet Union, in July 1989, triggered by an increasing inter-ethnic tensions between the Abkhaz and Georgian communities and followed by several days of street fighting and civil unrest in Sukhumi and throughout Abkhazia.

The riots started as an Abkhaz protest against opening of a branch of Tbilisi State University in Sukhumi, and concluded with looting of the Georgian school which was expected to house the new university on 16 July 1989. The ensuing violence quickly degenerated into a large-scale inter-ethnic confrontation. By the time when the Soviet army managed to temporarily bring the situation under control, the riots resulted in at least 18 dead and 448 injured, mostly Georgians. The first case of inter-ethnic violence in Georgia, it effectively marked the start of the Georgian-Abkhaz conflict.

== Background ==
Abkhazia, being part of medieval Kingdom of Georgia and western Georgian Kingdom of Imereti, joined the Georgia in modern times as recently as 1918 as an autonomous entity. After Soviet annexation of Georgia, from 1921 until 1931, Abkhazia was a quasi-independent Soviet republic, the Socialist Soviet Republic of Abkhazia (SSR Abkhazia), united with the Georgian SSR in a special treaty status but not fully subservient. This arrangement ended when the SSR Abkhazia was downgraded into the Abkhaz ASSR and fully under the control of the Georgian SSR.

In 1956, Georgians protested a policy of de-stalinization of Nikita Khrushchev, inflamed by sarcastic and bitter manner in which Khrushchev emphasized Stalin's Georgian character. Thus, Stalin's denigration was seen as a symbol for the mistreatment of Georgian national consciousness at the hands of the Soviet rulers. The protests were violently dispersed by the Soviet authorities, with estimates of the number of casualties ranging from several dozens to several hundred. The separatist elements in Abkhazia capitalized on these circumstances to win over the support of the Soviet government and launched counter-protests in 1957, including against autonomous status of Abkhazia within Georgia. Anti-Georgian telegrams, letters and statements were sent to the central Soviet authorities in Moscow by the Abkhaz, while the Georgian inscriptions in Abkhazia were destroyed or falsified. The Soviet government responded by granting significant privileges to the Abkhaz. These protests were repeated again in 1967, and in 1978, the latter capitalizing on embarrassment faced by the Soviet government when it had to concede to the Georgian protesters who thus successfully defended the constitutional status of Georgian language in the Georgian SSR. Therefore, each time the Abkhaz protests resulted in the Soviet government favoring the Abkhaz and granting ethnic-based privileges in the Abkhaz SSR. These privileges included the upgrading of the Sukhum Pedagogical Institute into a full university, Abkhaz State University, but also wide over-representation of the Abkhaz in the nomenklatura.

As the Georgian dissidents began to campaign for the Georgian independence and mobilized large number of protesters in the late 1980s, on 17 June 1988, an 87-page document, known as the 'Abkhazian Letter', was sent to Mikhail Gorbachev and the rest of the Soviet leadership. Signed by 60 leading Abkhaz Communists, it outlined "the grievances the Abkhaz felt", and argued that despite the concessions of 1978, autonomy had largely been ignored in the region. Thus, it asked for Abkhazia to be removed from the Georgian SSR, and to be "restored as a full Soviet republic, akin to the SSR Abkhazia".

Further issues occurred on 18 March 1989. Around 37,000 people met at the village of Lykhny, a traditional meeting spot for the Abkhaz, and signed what became known as the Lykhny Declaration. It once again called for Abkhazia to become a separate republic like it was between 1921 and 1931. The Declaration, which unlike the prior 'Abkhazian Letter' was made public immediately saw mass opposition demonstrations from the Georgian community in Abkhazia. The protests climaxed in the Georgian capital of Tbilisi and evolved into a major anti-Soviet and pro-independence rally on 9 April 1989, which was violently dispersed by Internal Troops of the Soviet Union, resulting in the deaths of at least nineteen, mostly young women, and the injury of hundreds of demonstrators. (Note: Sources differ on the number of dead: Stephen Jones, a historian of the Caucasus, states 19 (Jones 2013, pp. 31–32), while the BBC and Eurasianet, a news website focusing on the Caucasus, both claim 20 (Eke 2009; Lomsadze 2014); Donald Rayfield, a professor of Russian and Georgian literature and history, has written that 21 died (Rayfield 2012, p. 378)) By April, the demonstrations had become increasingly violent. Abkhaz rioters attacked buses carrying Georgian students in Gagra, Bzipi, and Gudauta. At a plenum of the Georgian central committee the following day the Communist party first secretary, Jumber Patiashvili, resigned and was replaced by the former head of the Georgian KGB, Givi Gumbaridze. The 9 April tragedy removed the last vestiges of credibility from the Soviet regime in Georgia and pushed many Georgians into radical opposition to the Soviet Union, and exacerbated ethnic tensions between Georgians and other groups, in particular the Abkhaz and Ossetians.

== The university controversy ==
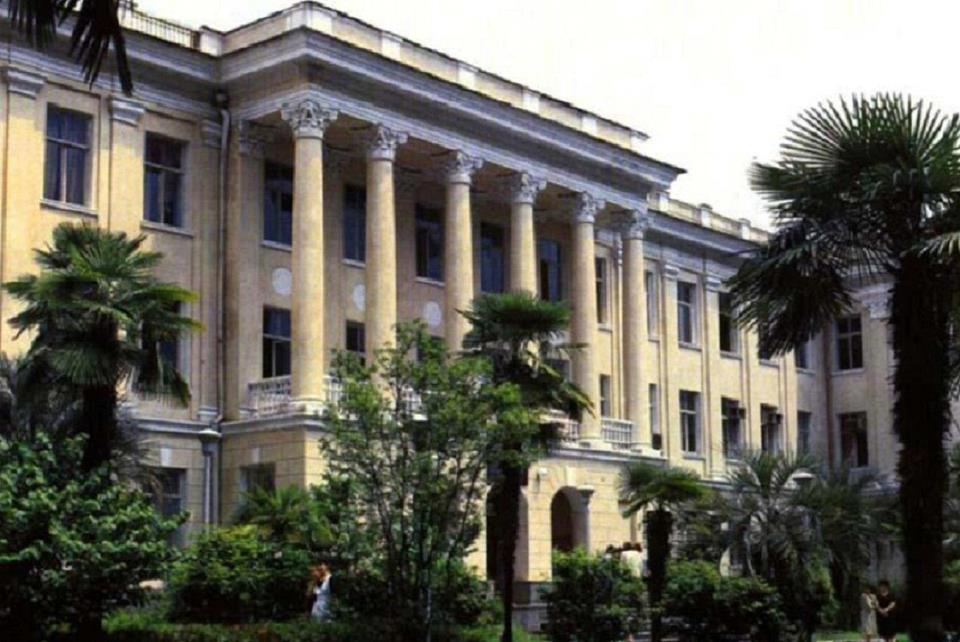
The status of Abkhazian State University, pictured here in 2013, was the source of the riots.

The issue of a university had always been very sensitive in Abkhazia. Sukhumi State University was established in 1978 as a part of the concessions towards the Abkhaz secessionist demands, which in its turn was triggered by the Georgian national mobilization in defense of their language and culture. The university had three sectors: Abkhaz, Georgian, and Russian. However, Georgian students repeatedly complained of discrimination at the hands of their Abkhaz and Russian lectors and administration. In the aftermath of the 9 April events, Georgian students at Sukhumi State University started a hunger strike, calling for the Georgian sector of the university to be transformed into a branch of Tbilisi State University, and in effect controlled by Georgians and not Abkhaz. Joined by students and faculty from the Subtropical Institute, this was part of a campaign started by ethnic Georgians in Abkhazia for greater cultural separation, and more clear division between the two ethnic groups. Aware it would cause unrest in Abkhazia, the authorities approved the measure on 14 May. In response Abkhaz organized a sit-in. The Supreme Soviet in Moscow also launched a commission, which ruled that the Georgians had no authority to establish the university, as that was solely under its purview. They concluded that a region the size of Abkhazia had no need for two universities.

== The riots ==
Despite the ruling against the legality of the university, entrance exams were scheduled for 15 July. Attempts by Abkhaz to photograph the crowds of Georgians congregated in the city is said to have started the violence. By 7:00pm the university was under attack. Late on 16 July, a crowd of five thousand Abkhaz, many of whom were armed, surged into the building. Several members of the Georgian exam commission were beaten up, and the school was looted.

This set off a chain of events that produced further casualties and destruction as the both sides engaged in armed fighting for several days to come. That evening, Abkhaz and Georgians began mobilizing all over Abkhazia and western Georgia. Svans, an ethnic Georgian subgroup from northeastern Abkhazia, and Abkhaz from the town of Tkvarcheli in Abkhazia clashed in a shootout that lasted all night and intermittently for several days afterward. Meanwhile, up to 25,000 Georgians from western Georgia, and the predominantly Georgian Gali district in southern Abkhazia, gathered near Ochamchire. Soviet Interior Ministry troops were sent in to restore order, and by 17 July the violence had largely dissipated.

== Aftermath ==
The July events in Abkhazia left at least 18 dead and 448 injured, of whom, according to official accounts, 302 were Georgians. It also marked the first case of inter-ethnic violence in Georgia; while previous protests and demonstrations had occurred in Abkhazia, none had seen any casualties. Although a continuous presence of the Interior Ministry troops maintained a precarious peace in the region, outbursts of violence did occur, and the Soviet government made no progress toward solving any of the inter-ethnic problems. The Georgians suspected the attack on their university was intentionally staged by the Abkhaz secessionists in order to provoke a large-scale violence that would prompt Moscow to declare a martial law in the region, thus depriving the government in Tbilisi of any control over the autonomous structures in Abkhazia. At the same time, they accused the Soviet government of manipulating ethnic issues to curb Georgia's otherwise irrepressible independence movement. On the other hand, the Abkhaz claimed that the new university was an instrument in the hands of Georgians to reinforce their cultural dominance in the region, and continued to demand that the investigation of the July events be turned over to Moscow and that no branch of Tbilisi State University be opened in Sukhumi.

Tensions remained high in Abkhazia, and saw the Abkhaz totally disregard Georgian authority in the region. This was confirmed on 25 August 1990, when the Abkhaz Supreme Soviet passed a declaration, "On Abkhazia's State Sovereignty," which gave supremacy to Abkhaz laws over Georgian ones. The same day the Supreme Soviet also declared Abkhazia to be a full union republic within the Soviet Union. Georgian authority had effectively ceased in Abkhazia: Abkhazia took part in the Soviet referendum on 17 March 1991, which the rest of Georgia boycotted, while the non-Georgian population of region (along with South Ossetia, another autonomous region of Georgia), in turn boycotted the referendum on independence on 9 April 1991.

The Abkhaz demanded guaranteed representation of no less than 50 percent in the Abkhaz Supreme Soviet and opposed democratic elections because they constituted only 18 percent of Abkhazia's population. The recently elected Georgian President Zviad Gamsakhurdia chose to compromise rather than force a confrontation and gave greater representation in the Supreme Soviet to the predominantly Abkhaz districts of the region. Of the sixty-five seats, twenty-eight were reserved for the Abkhaz, twenty-six for Georgians, and eleven for other nationalities. The conflict, however, continued after the election of the Supreme Soviet, centering on disputes over government appointments. On 23 July 1992, the Abkhaz Supreme Soviet re-instated the 1925 constitution, which had called Abkhazia a sovereign state, albeit one in a "treaty union" with Georgia, effectively declaring independence. In August 1992, Abkhaz militias fired upon the Georgian army, which had been sent by the new Georgian leader Eduard Shevardnadze to retrieve Georgian officials held hostage in Abkhazia. With significant support from the Russian military and volunteers from the North Caucasus, Abkhaz forces recaptured the territory held by the Georgians by September 1993. This was followed by the mass exodus of ethnic Georgians from Abkhazia as a result of the brutal ethnic cleansing carried out by Abkhaz forces. In the aftermath of the 1992–1993 war, the Sukhumi branch of Tbilisi State University, which had remained open, was relocated to Tbilisi as the city fell out of Georgian control. It was re-established in Tbilisi in December 1993, and remains there.

== Bibliography ==
- Beissinger, Mark R. (2002), Nationalist Mobilization and the Collapse of the Soviet State, Cambridge, United Kingdom: Cambridge University Press, ISBN 0-521-00148-X
- Chervonnaya, Svetlana (1994), Conflict in the Caucasus: Georgia, Abkhazia and the Russian Shadow, translated by Ariane Chanturia, Glastonbury, United Kingdom: Gothic Image Publications, ISBN 978-0-90-636230-3
- Cornell, Svante E. (2002), Autonomy and Conflict: Ethnoterritoriality and Separatism in the South Caucasus: Cases in Georgia, Uppsala, Sweden: Uppsala University, Department of Peace and Conflict Research, ISBN 91-506-1600-5
- Eke, Stephen (2009), Georgia recalls Soviet crackdown, BBC
- Francis, Céline (2011), Conflict Resolution and Status: The Case of Georgia and Abkhazia (1989–2008), Brussels: VUB Press, ISBN 978-90-5487-899-5
- Hewitt, B.G. (1993), "Abkhazia: A problem of identity and ownership", Central Asian Survey, 12 (3): 267–323, doi:10.1080/02634939308400819
- Hewitt, George (2013), Discordant Neighbours: A Reassessment of the Georgian-Abkhazian and Georgian-South Ossetian Conflicts, Leiden, The Netherlands: Brill, ISBN 978-9-00-424892-2
- Hewitt, B.G (1996), "The Georgian/South Ossetian territorial and boundary dispute", in Wright, John F.R.; Goldenberg, Suzanne; Schofield, Richard (eds.), Transcaucasian Boundaries, London: UCL Press Limited, pp. 190–225, ISBN 1-85728-234-5
- Jones, Stephen (2013), Georgia: A Political History Since Independence, London: I.B. Taurus, ISBN 978-1-78453-085-3
- Kaufman, Stuart J. (2001), Modern Hatreds: The Symbolic Politics of Ethnic War, Ithaca, New York: Cornell University Press, ISBN 0-8014-8736-6
- Lakoba, Stanislav (1995), "Abkhazia is Abkhazia", Central Asian Survey, 14 (1): 97–105, doi:10.1080/02634939508400893
- Lang, David Marshall (1962), A Modern History of Soviet Georgia, New York City: Grove Press, OCLC 317495278
- Lomsadze, Giorgi (2014), For Tbilisi, the Battle of April 9, 1989 Continues, Eurasianet
- Ozhiganov, Edward (1997), "The Republic of Georgia: Conflict in Abkhazia and South Ossetia", in Arbatov, Alexei; Chayes, Abram; Handler Chayes, Antonia; Olson, Lara (eds.), Managing Conflict in the Former Soviet Union: Russian and American Perspectives, Cambridge, Massachusetts: The MIT Press, pp. 341–400, ISBN 0-262-51093-6
- Popkov, Viktor (1998), "Soviet Abkhazia 1989: A Personal Account", in Hewitt, George (ed.), The Abkhazians: A Handbook, New York City: St. Martin's Press, pp. 102–131, ISBN 978-0-31-221975-8
- Rayfield, Donald (2012), Edge of Empires: A History of Georgia, London: Reaktion Books, ISBN 978-1-78-023030-6
- Saparov, Arsène (2015), From Conflict to Autonomy in the Caucasus: The Soviet Union and the making of Abkhazia, South Ossetia and Nagorno Karabakh, New York City: Routledge, ISBN 978-0-41-565802-7
- Slider, Darrell (1985), "Crisis and response in Soviet nationality policy: The case of Abkhazia", Central Asian Survey, 4 (4): 51–68, doi:10.1080/02634938508400523
- Sokhumi State University (2014), Brief History of University, archived from the original on 2018-01-03
- Suny, Ronald Grigor (1994), The Making of the Georgian Nation (Second ed.), Bloomington, Indiana: Indiana University Press, ISBN 978-0-25-320915-3
- Zürcher, Christoph (2005), "Georgia's Time of Troubles, 1989–1993", in Coppieters, Bruno; Legvold, Robert (eds.), Statehood and Security: Georgia after the Rose Revolution, Cambridge, Massachusetts: The MIT Press, pp. 83–115, ISBN 0-262-03343-7
