= Abkhaz Autonomous Soviet Socialist Republic =

Former autonomous soviet socialist republic of a union republic of the Soviet Union

Coordinates: 43°00′N 41°01′E

Abkhaz Autonomous Soviet Socialist Republic Аҧснытәи Автономтә Советтә Социалисттә Республика (Abkhaz) აფხაზეთის ავტონომიური საბჭოთა სოციალისტური რესპუბლიკა (Georgian) Абхазская Автономная Советская Социалистическая Республика (Russian)
- 1931–1992
- Flag (1978–1992) State emblem (1981–1992)
- Motto: Атәылақуа зегьы рпролетарцәа, шәҽеидышәкыл! Aṭ°əlakwa zeg'y rproletarc°a, š°čeidyš°kyl! "Proletarians of all countries, unite!"
- Status: 1931–1990: Autonomous republic of the Soviet Union; 1990–1992: Autonomous republic with priority of the Abkhaz legislation
- Capital: Sukhumi
- Common languages: Abkhaz, Georgian, Russian
- Government: 1931–1991: Unitary communist state; 1991–1992: Unitary parliamentary republic
- First Secretary
  - 1931–1936 (first): Vladimir Ladariya
  - 1989–1991 (last): Vladimir Khishba
- Head of state
  - 1931–1936 (first): Nestor Lakoba
  - 1990–1992 (last): Vladislav Ardzinba
- Head of government
  - 1931–1936 (first): Nestor Lakoba
  - 1990–1992 (last): Vladimir Mikanba (acting)
- Legislature: Supreme Soviet
- History
  - Established: 19 February 1931
  - Declaration of sovereignty: 25 August 1990
  - New Union Treaty referendum: 17 March 1991
  - Disestablished: 23 July 1992

Area
- 1989: 8,600 km^{2} (3,300 sq mi)

Population
  - 1989: 525,061
- Currency: Ruble
- Calling code: +7 881
Preceded by	Succeeded by
SSR Abkhazia	Abkhazia; Government of the Autonomous Republic of Abkhazia

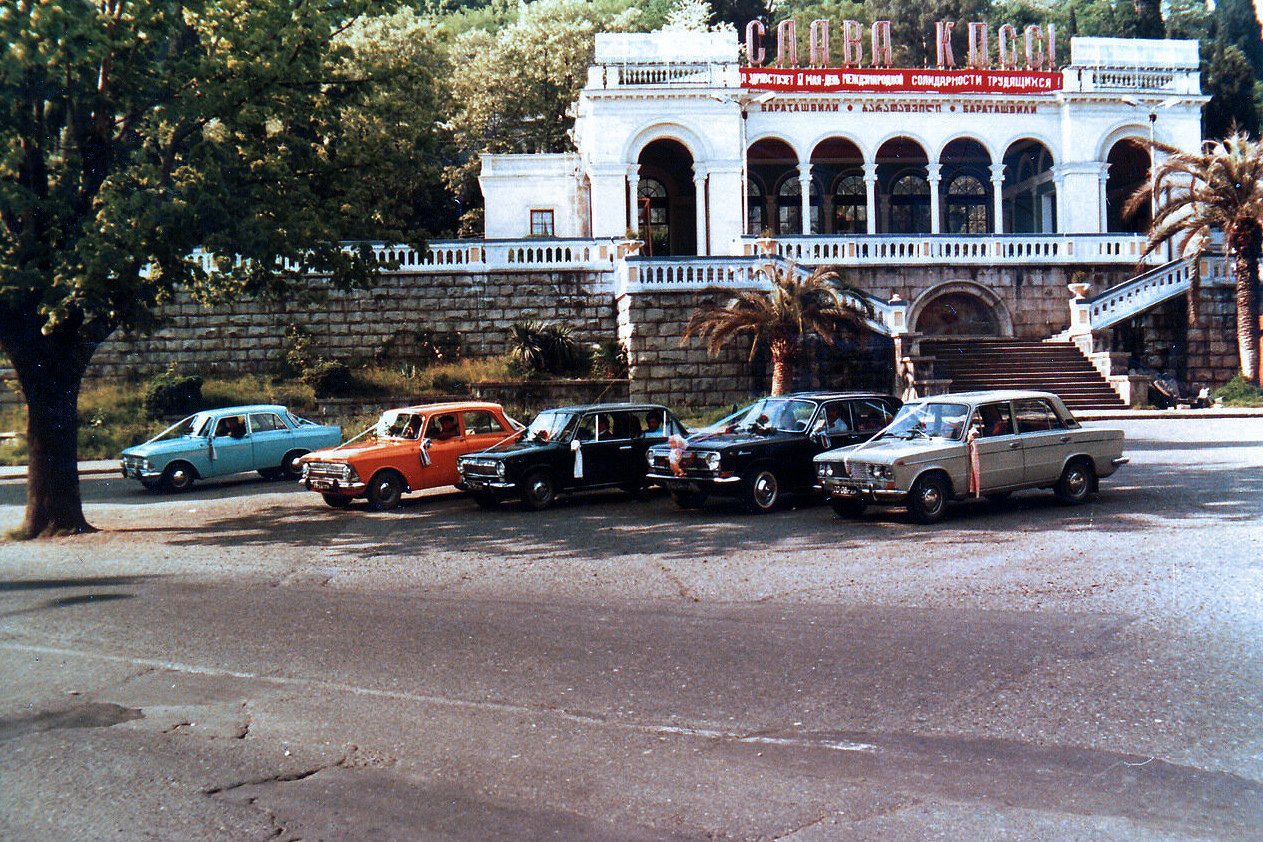
Street scene in Sukhumi, 1979. The slogan Slava KPSS! is visible on top of the building, meaning "Glory to the Communist Party of the Soviet Union!"

The Abkhaz Autonomous Soviet Socialist Republic, (Note: Russian: Абхазская Автономная Советская Социалистическая Республика, romanized: Abkhazskaya Avtonomnaya Sovetskaya Sotsialisticheskaya Respublika; Georgian: აფხაზეთის ავტონომიური საბჭოთა სოციალისტური რესპუბლიკა, romanized: apkhazetis avt'onomiuri sabch'ota sotsialist'uri resp'ublik'a; Abkhaz: Аԥснытәи Автономтә Советтә Социалисттә Республика, romanized: Apsnyt'i Avtonomt' Sovett' Socialistt' Respublika) abbreviated as Abkhaz ASSR, (Note: Russian: Абхазская АССР; Georgian: აფხაზეთის ასსრ; Abkhaz: Аҧснытәи АССР) was an autonomous republic of the Georgian SSR within the Soviet Union. It came into existence on 19 February 1931 and adopted its first constitution on 2 August 1937. The supreme organ of legislative power in the autonomous republic was the Supreme Soviet, elected every 4 years, and its Presidium. The executive power in the autonomous republic was vested with the Council of Ministers appointed by the Supreme Soviet. The Abkhaz ASSR had 11 representatives in the Council of Nationalities of the Supreme Soviet of the USSR. The autonomous republic ceased to exist following the dissolution of the Soviet Union.

== History ==
=== Formation ===
The Socialist Soviet Republic of Abkhazia (SSR Abkhazia) was established in 1921 following the Soviet invasion of Georgia, in place of the Abkhazian Autonomy. The Abkhazian SSR, which was united with the Georgian SSR later that year as a "treaty republic", existed until 1931. During this period, it was granted considerable autonomy by virtue of its unique status within Georgia. Its precise constitutional status was never fully defined and remained ambiguous; paradoxically, the 1924 Soviet Constitution had referred to Abkhazia as an autonomous republic. This concerned the Soviet and Georgian authorities, and its status was eventually brought into line with that of other autonomous republics. So on 19 February 1931 the SSR Abkhazia was reformed as the Abkhaz Autonomous Soviet Socialist Republic within the Georgian SSR, which itself was a constituent republic of the Transcaucasian Socialist Federative Soviet Republic (TSFSR).

The downgrading of Abkhazia was not popular amongst the Abkhaz population. The SSR Abkhazia had a considerable degree of autonomy, including its own national symbols (a flag and coat-of-arms), and national army units, a right only given to full republics. It also had its own constitution, another right only granted to full republics. When it was reformed into the Abkhaz ASSR protests broke out in the region, the first time large-scale protests against the Soviet authorities had occurred there. However, the continued existence of the Abkhaz SSR would have been an anomaly within Soviet nationalities policy, as the Abkhaz population was too small to sustain a separate union republic. Full-republic status was generally reserved for ethnic groups with substantial populations, both in absolute numbers and as a proportion of the population of the respective region (ethnic Abkhazians accounted for only 27.8% of Abkhazia's population according to the 1926 census). Although Abkhazia was formally granted an independent status in 1921, this did not imply separation from Georgia. Soviet documentation consistently envisaged only three Soviet republics in the South Caucasus—Armenia, Azerbaijan, and Georgia—indicating that Abkhazia was not intended to rank alongside the other Union republics. Its status followed a broader Bolshevik pattern of establishing nominally independent Soviet socialist republics in smaller territories during the Civil War, which were subsequently incorporated into larger Soviet units. Similar examples included the Nakhichevan SSR, Kuban–Black Sea SSR, Stavropol SSR, and several republics in Central Asia.

=== Dissolution ===
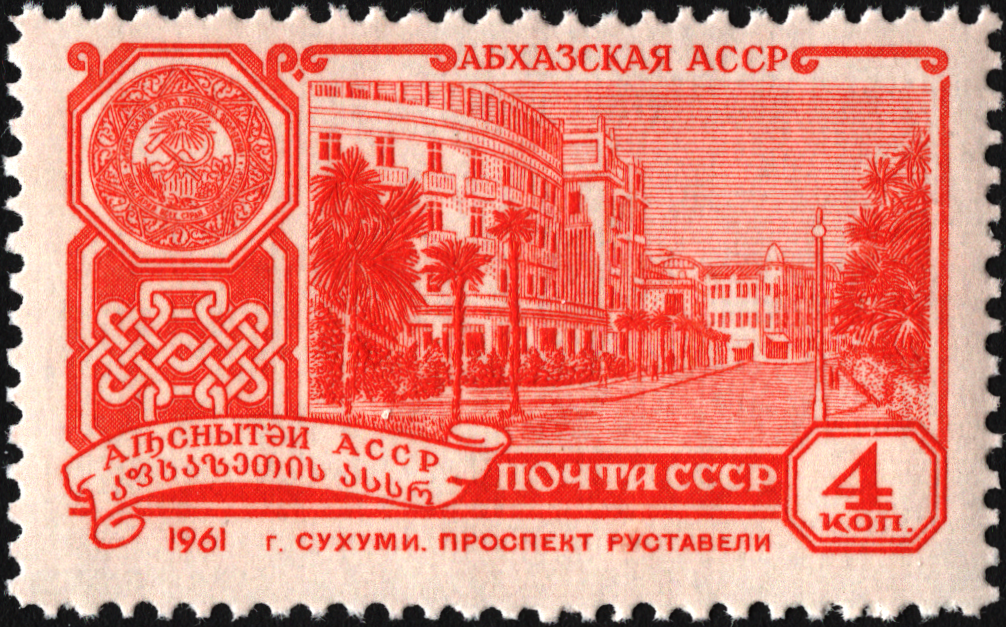
1961 stamp showing Rustaveli Avenue, Sukhumi.

In the 1980s, the advent of perestroika allowed the Abkhaz an outlet to express their dissatisfaction of their status within Georgia. In 1988 a letter, signed by leading Abkhazians, was forwarded to Mikhail Gorbachev and the Soviet leadership. It outlined the grievances the Abkhaz felt and argued that despite the concessions of 1978, autonomy had largely been ignored in the region. It concluded by asking for Abkhazia to be removed from the Georgian SSR, and it to be restored as a full Soviet republic, akin to the SSR Abkhazia. This was followed in March 1989 with the Lykhny Declaration, which was a document signed by some 37,000 people. This led to protests in Georgia, which culminated into a major anti-Soviet and pro-Georgian independence rally in Tbilisi on 9 April 1989, which was violently dispersed by Soviet Interior Ministry troops, resulting in the deaths of twenty, mostly young women, and the injury of hundreds of demonstrators. The 9 April tragedy removed the last vestiges of credibility from the Soviet regime in Georgia and pushed many Georgians into radical opposition to the Soviet Union, and exacerbated ethnic tensions between Georgians and other groups, in particular the Abkhaz and Ossetians. Further riots in Sukhumi opposing the establishment of a branch of the Tbilisi State University exacerbated Abkhaz nationalism.

Tensions remained high in Abkhazia and saw the Abkhaz totally disregard Georgian authority in the region. This was confirmed on 25 August 1990, when the Abkhaz Supreme Soviet passed a declaration, "On Abkhazia's State Sovereignty", which gave supremacy to Abkhaz laws over Georgian ones. The Supreme Soviet also declared Abkhazia to be a full union republic within the Soviet Union. The Georgian Supreme Soviet promptly annulled the declaration. Abkhazia took part in the Soviet referendum on the New Union Treaty on 17 March 1991, which the rest of Georgia boycotted, while the non-Georgian population of the region (along with South Ossetia, another autonomous region of Georgia), in turn boycotted the Georgian referendum on independence on 9 April 1991.

A power-sharing deal was agreed upon in August 1991, dividing electoral districts by ethnicity, with the 1991 elections held under this format. The agreement granted the Abkhaz disproportionate representation in the Supreme Soviet, giving them the largest number of seats despite being a minority of the republic's population. However, the newly elected Supreme Soviet of Abkhazia became polarized along ethnic lines, and the arrangement proved short-lived. On 23 July 1992, the Abkhaz Supreme Soviet, without the consent of its Georgian deputies, reinstated the 1925 Abkhaz constitution, which had defined Abkhazia as a sovereign state, albeit one in treaty union with Georgia. The Georgian army entered Abkhazia in August 1992 to rescue captured Georgian officials and restore railway communications, but was met with fire from Abkhaz militias, leading Georgian forces to take Sukhumi and dissolve the regional parliament. The crisis would develop into a war that lasted until September 1993 and ultimately lead to the ongoing Abkhazia conflict.

== Culture ==
The Abkhaz language saw multiple changes in script during the Soviet era. Under korenizatsiia the Abkhaz were considered as "culturally backward", and thus saw an increased focus on their national language and cultural development. As part of these policies, the Abkhaz language script was Latinized in 1928, along with many other regional languages in the USSR, moving from the original 19th-century Cyrillic-based script in the process. This policy was reversed in 1938, with Cyrillic replacing most of the Latin alphabets. Abkhaz was one of the few exceptions; along with Ossetian in the South Ossetian Autonomous Oblast (also of the Georgian SSR), it adopted a Georgian script, which lasted until 1953 when it reverted to Cyrillic (Ossetian did the same).

== See also ==
- Abkhazian Autonomy
- Government of the Autonomous Republic of Abkhazia
- Abkhaz Regional Committee of the Communist Party of Georgia

== Sources ==
- Anchabadze, Yu. D.; Argun, Yu. G. (2012), Абхазы (Abkhazians) (in Russian), Moscow: Nauka
- Blauvelt, Timothy (May 2007), "Abkhazia: Patronage and Power in the Stalin Era", Nationalities Papers, 35 (2): 203–232, doi:10.1080/00905990701254318, S2CID 128803263
- Broers, Laurence (June 2009), "'David and Goliath' and 'Georgians in the Kremlin': a post-colonial perspective on conflict in post-Soviet Georgia", Central Asian Survey, 28 (2): 99–118, doi:10.1080/02634930903034096, S2CID 144297310
- Chervonnaya, Svetlana (1994), Conflict in the Caucasus: Georgia, Abkhazia and the Russian Shadow, translated by Ariane Chanturia, Glastonbury, United Kingdom: Gothic Image Publications, ISBN 978-0-90-636230-3
- Francis, Céline (2011), Conflict Resolution and Status: The Case of Georgia and Abkhazia (1989–2008), Brussels: VUB Press, ISBN 978-90-5487-899-5
- Hewitt, B.G (1996), "The Georgian/South Ossetian territorial and boundary dispute", in Wright, John F.R.; Goldenberg, Suzanne; Schofield, Richard (eds.), Transcaucasian Boundaries, London: UCL Press Limited, pp. 190–225, ISBN 1-85728-234-5
- Hewitt, George, ed. (1998), The Abkhazians: A Handbook, New York City: St. Martin's Press
- Jones, Stephen (2013), Georgia:A Political History Since Independence, London: I.B. Taurus, ISBN 978-1-78453-085-3
- Jones, Stephen F. (October 1988), "The Establishment of Soviet Power in Transcaucasia: The Case of Georgia 1921–1928", Soviet Studies, 40 (4): 616–639, doi:10.1080/09668138808411783
- Lakoba, Stanislav (1995), "Abkhazia is Abkhazia", Central Asian Survey, 14 (1): 97–105, doi:10.1080/02634939508400893
- Lakoba, Stanislav (1990), Очерки Политической Истории Абхазии (Essays on the Political History of Abkhazia) (in Russian), Sukhumi, Abkhazia: Alashara
- Lakoba, Stanislav (2001), "Я Коба а ты Лакоба (I am Koba and you are Lakoba", in Iskander, Fasil (ed.), Мое сердце в горах: очерки о современной Абхазии (My heart is in the mountains: Essays on modern Abkhazia) (in Russian), Yoshkar Ola: Izd-vo Mariskogo Poligrafkombinata
- Martin, Terry (2001), The Affirmative Action Empire: Nations and Nationalism in the Soviet Union, 1923–1939, Ithaca, New York: Cornell University Press, ISBN 978-0-80-143813-4
- Rayfield, Donald (2012), Edge of Empires: A History of Georgia, London: Reaktion Books, ISBN 978-1-78-023030-6
- Saparov, Arsène (2015), From Conflict to Autonomy in the Caucasus: The Soviet Union and the making of Abkhazia, South Ossetia and Nagorno Karabakh, New York City: Routledge
- Suny, Ronald Grigor (1994), The Making of the Georgian Nation (Second ed.), Bloomington, Indiana: Indiana University Press
- Wheatley, Jonathan (2005). Georgia from National Awakening to Rose Revolution. Ashgate Publishing. ISBN 9780754645030.
- Slider, Darrell (1997). "Democratization in Georgia". In Parrott, Bruce; Dawisha, Karen (eds.). Conflict, Cleavage, and Change in Central Asia and the Caucasus. Cambridge University Press.
- Zürcher, Christoph (2007), The Post-Soviet Wars: Rebellion, Ethnic Conflict, and Nationhood in the Caucasus, New York City: New York University Press
