= Parliamentary republic =

Form of government

A parliamentary republic is a republic that operates under a parliamentary system of government where the executive branch (called the government in such systems) derives its legitimacy from and is accountable to the legislature (the parliament). Both executive and legislative powers are ultimately held within the parliament (fusion of powers) as most commonly the government is a subset of the members of the parliament (as opposed to congressional systems, where the congress - the legislature - is part of the government in the wider sense of the word).

There are a number of variations of parliamentary republics. Most have a clear differentiation between the head of government and the head of state, with the head of government holding real power and the head of state being a ceremonial position, similar to constitutional monarchies. In some countries the head of state has reserve powers to use at their discretion as a non-partisan "referee" of the political process. Some parliamentary republics (parliamentary republics with an executive presidency) have combined the roles of head of state and head of government, like presidential systems, but with a dependency upon parliamentary confidence.

In general, parliamentary republics grant the highest sovereign powers to the parliament. However, much like in monarchies, the head of state occupies an important formal role on the top of the legal system. The head of state, called a president (or president of the republic) in parliamentary republics, is usually elected directly by popular vote. However, there are some notable exceptions, where the president is elected by a special assembly or electoral college (e.g. Germany) or by members of parliament (e.g. Italy) in a special process.

== Fusion of powers ==
World's states colored by systems of government: Parliamentary systems: Head of government is elected or nominated by and accountable to the legislature. Constitutional monarchy with a ceremonial monarch Semi-constitutional monarchy: Monarch holds significant executive or legislative power but is still restricted by the constitution. Parliamentary republic with a ceremonial president Parliamentary republic with an executive president Presidential system: Head of government (president) is popularly elected and independent of the legislature. Presidential republic Theocratic presidential republic: Supreme leader is highest authority; popularly elected president still exists. Hybrid systems: Semi-presidential republic: Executive president is independent of the legislature; head of government is appointed by the president and is accountable to the legislature. Assembly-independent republic: Head of government (president or directory) is elected by the legislature, but is not accountable to it. Other systems: Islamic theocracy: Supreme leader holds unlimited political and religious power; state and faith are a single institution. Absolute monarchy: Monarch has unlimited power. One-party state: Power is constitutionally linked to a single political party. Provisional government: Current regime is temporary or transitional; no permanent constitution. Military junta: Committee of military leaders controls the government; constitutional provisions are suspended. Places without governments. Note: this chart represents the de jure systems of government, not the de facto degree of democracy.

In parliamentary republics, both executive and legislative powers are primarily held within the parliament.

In contrast to republics operating under either the presidential system or the semi-presidential system, the head of state usually does not have executive powers as an executive president would (some may have reserve powers or additional, but limited, powers), because many of those powers have been granted to a head of government (usually called a prime minister).

In a parliamentary republic with a head of state whose tenure is dependent on parliament, the head of government and head of state can form one office (as in Botswana, the Marshall Islands, Nauru, and South Africa), but the president is still selected in much the same way as the prime minister is in most Westminster systems. This usually means that they are the leader of the largest party or coalition of parties in parliament.

In some cases, the president can legally have executive powers granted to them to undertake the day-to-day running of government (as in Iceland) but by convention, they either do not use these powers or they use them only to give effect to the advice of the parliament or head of government. Some parliamentary republics could therefore be seen as following the semi-presidential system but operating under a parliamentary system.

== Historical development ==
Typically, parliamentary republics are states that were previously constitutional monarchies with a parliamentary system.

Following the defeat of Napoleon III in the Franco-Prussian War, France again became a republic – the French Third Republic – in 1870. The President of the Third Republic had significantly less executive powers than those of the previous two republics had. The Third Republic lasted until the invasion of France by Nazi Germany in 1940. Following the end of the war, the French Fourth Republic was constituted along similar lines in 1946. The Fourth Republic saw an era of great economic growth in France and the rebuilding of the nation's social institutions and industry after the war, and played an important part in the development of the process of European integration, which changed the continent permanently. Some attempts were made to strengthen the executive branch of government to prevent the unstable situation that had existed before the war, but the instability remained and the Fourth Republic saw frequent changes in government – there were 20 governments in ten years. Additionally, the government proved unable to make effective decisions regarding decolonization. As a result, the Fourth Republic collapsed and Charles de Gaulle was given power to rule by decree, subsequently legitimized by approval of a new constitution in a referendum on 28 September 1958, which led to the establishment of the French Fifth Republic in 1959.

=== Commonwealth of Nations ===
Since the London Declaration of 29 April 1949 (just weeks after Ireland declared itself a republic and excluded itself from the Commonwealth), republics have been admitted as members of the Commonwealth of Nations.

In the case of many republics in the Commonwealth of Nations, it was common for the sovereign, formerly represented by a governor-general, to be replaced by a non-executive head of state. This was the case in South Africa (which ceased to be a member of the Commonwealth immediately upon becoming a republic, and later transitioned to having an executive presidency), Malta, Trinidad and Tobago, India, Vanuatu and since 30 November 2021, Barbados. In many of these examples, the last governor-general became the first president. Such was the case with Sri Lanka and Pakistan.

Other states became parliamentary republics upon gaining independence.

== List of modern parliamentary republics and related systems ==
Full parliamentary republics
Country/territory	Head of state	Head of state elected by	Cameral structure	Parliamentary republic adopted	Previous government form	Notes
Albania	Bajram Begaj	Parliament, by three-fifths majority	Unicameral	1991	One-party state	
Armenia	Vahagn Khachaturyan	Parliament, by absolute majority	Unicameral	2018 (Note: Changed after the 2015 referendum.)	Semi-presidential republic	
Austria	Alexander Van der Bellen	Direct election, by two-round system	Bicameral	1945	One-party state (as part of Nazi Germany, see Anschluss)	De jure semi-presidential republic operating as a full parliamentary republic.
Bangladesh	Hafiz Uddin Ahmad	Parliament	Unicameral	1991 (Note: Was, previously, a parliamentary republic between 1972 and 1975.)	Semi-presidential republic	
Barbados	Jeffrey Bostic	Parliament, by two-thirds majority if there is no joint nomination	Bicameral	2021	Constitutional monarchy (Commonwealth realm)	
Bosnia and Herzegovina	Denis Bećirović; Željka Cvijanović; Željko Komšić	Direct election of collective head of state, by first-past-the-post vote	Bicameral	1991	One-party state (part of Yugoslavia)	
Bulgaria	Iliana Iotova	Direct election, by two-round system	Unicameral	1991	One-party state	
Croatia	Zoran Milanović	Direct election, by two-round system	Unicameral	2000	Semi-presidential republic	
Czech Republic	Petr Pavel	Direct election, by two-round system (since 2013; previously parliament, by majority)	Bicameral	1993	Parliamentary republic (part of Czechoslovakia)	
Dominica	Sylvanie Burton	Parliament, by majority	Unicameral	1978	Associated state of the United Kingdom	
Estonia	Alar Karis	Parliament, by two-thirds majority	Unicameral	1991 (Note: Estonia was previously a parliamentary republic between 1918 and 1934 when the system was changed to a presidential system which was thereafter overthrown by a coup d'état. In 1938, Estonia finally adopted a presidential system and in June 1940 was illegally occupied by the Soviet Union. Became a parliamentary republic again in 1990 with the implementation of an interim period to restore full independence, which was achieved by 1991.)	Presidential republic, thereafter occupied by a one-party state	
Ethiopia	Taye Atske Selassie	Parliament, by two-thirds majority	Bicameral	1991	One-party state	
Fiji	Naiqama Lalabalavu	Parliament, by majority	Unicameral	2014	Military dictatorship	
Finland	Alexander Stubb	Direct election, by two-round system	Unicameral	2000 (Note: Formerly a semi-presidential republic, it is now a parliamentary republic according to David Arter, First Chair of Politics at Aberdeen University. In his "Scandinavian Politics Today" (Manchester University Press, revised 2008 ISBN 9780719078538), he quotes Nousiainen, Jaakko (June 2001). "From semi-presidentialism to parliamentary government: political and constitutional developments in Finland". Scandinavian Political Studies. 24 (2): 95–109. doi:10.1111/1467-9477.00048. as follows: "There are hardly any grounds for the epithet 'semi-presidential'." Arter's own conclusions are only slightly more nuanced: "The adoption of a new constitution on 1 March 2000 meant that Finland was no longer a case of semi-presidential government other than in the minimalist sense of a situation where a popularly elected fixed-term president exists alongside a prime minister and cabinet who are responsible to parliament (Elgie 2004: 317)". According to the Finnish Constitution, the president has no possibility to rule the government without the ministerial approval, and does not have the power to dissolve the parliament under his or her own desire. Finland is actually represented by its prime minister, and not by its president, in the Council of the Heads of State and Government of the European Union. The 2012 constitutional amendments reduced the powers of the president even further.)	Semi-presidential republic	
Georgia	Mikheil Kavelashvili (disputed) (Note: Kavelashvili's election is contested by outgoing President Salome Zourabichvili, all large opposition parties, as well as numerous watchdogs and constitutional experts, who question the legitimacy of the 2024 Georgian parliamentary election that determined the composition of the electoral college for the presidential election.)	Parliament and regional delegates, by absolute majority (since 2024; previously direct election, by two-round system)	Unicameral	2018	Semi-presidential republic	
Germany	Frank-Walter Steinmeier	Federal Convention (Bundestag and state delegates (Note: The Federal Convention is made up of all the members of the Bundestag. The other half is distributed to the 16 Länder, that then each elect Members to elect the President of Germany. Often German celebrities are chosen by the state parliaments.)), by absolute majority	Two unicameral institutions (Note: The Bundesrat is sometimes referred to as an upper chamber of the German legislature. This is technically incorrect, since the German Constitution defines the Bundestag and Bundesrat as two separate legislative institutions. It describes the Bundesrat as the constitutional organ which is representing the 16 Länder (States) of Germany. Hence, the federal legislature of Germany consists of two unicameral legislative institutions, not one bicameral parliament. However the Federal Constitutional Court itself referred to the Bundesrat in the English translation of this decision.)	1949 (Note: In the case of the former West German states, including former West Berlin, the previous one-party state is Nazi Germany, but in the case of the New Länder and former East Berlin it is East Germany. German reunification took place on 3 October 1990, when the five re-established states of the German Democratic Republic (East Germany) joined the Federal Republic of Germany, and Berlin was united into a single city-state. Therefore, this date applies to today's Federal Republic of Germany as a whole, although the area of former East Germany was no part of that parliamentary republic until 1990.)	One-party state (Nazi Germany)	
Greece	Konstantinos Tasoulas	Parliament, by majority	Unicameral	1975	Military dictatorship; constitutional monarchy	
Hungary	Ágnes Forsthoffer (Acting)	Parliament, by majority	Unicameral	1990	One-party state (Hungarian People's Republic)	
Iceland	Halla Tómasdóttir	Direct election, by first-past-the-post vote	Unicameral	1944	Constitutional monarchy (in a personal union with Denmark)	
India	Droupadi Murmu	Parliament and state legislature, by instant-runoff vote	Bicameral	1950	Constitutional monarchy (British Dominion)	
Iraq	Nizar Amidi	Parliament, by two-thirds majority	Unicameral (Note: Officially bicameral, upper house never entered into functions, to present day.)	2005	One-party state	
Ireland	Catherine Connolly	Direct election, by instant-runoff vote	Bicameral	1949 (Note: The head of state was ambiguous from 1936 until the Republic of Ireland Act came into force on 18 April 1949. A minority of Irish republicans assert that the Irish Republic proclaimed in 1919 is still extant.)	To 1936: Constitutional monarchy (British Dominion); 1936–1949: ambiguous	
Israel	Isaac Herzog	Parliament, by majority	Unicameral	2001	Semi-parliamentary republic	
Italy	Sergio Mattarella	Parliament and region delegates, by two-thirds majority; by absolute majority, starting from the fourth ballot, if no candidate achieves the aforementioned majority in the first three ballots	Bicameral	1946	Constitutional monarchy	Prime minister is dependent on the confidence of both of the houses of Parliament.
Kosovo	Albulena Haxhiu (Acting)	Parliament, by two-thirds majority; by a simple majority, at the third ballot, if no candidate achieves the aforementioned majority in the first two ballots	Unicameral	2008	UN-administered Kosovo (informally part of Serbia)	
Latvia	Edgars Rinkēvičs	Parliament	Unicameral	1991 (Note: Latvia was previously a parliamentary republic between 1921 and 1934 when the then prime minister Kārlis Ulmanis took power in a coup d'état. In June 1940 Latvia was occupied and annexed by the Soviet Union.)	Presidential republic, thereafter occupied by a one-party state	
Lebanon	Joseph Aoun	Parliament	Unicameral	1941	Protectorate (French mandate of Lebanon)	
Malta	Myriam Spiteri Debono	Parliament, by two-thirds majority	Unicameral	1974	Constitutional monarchy (Commonwealth realm)	
Mauritius	Dharam Gokhool	Parliament, by majority	Unicameral	1992	Constitutional monarchy (Commonwealth realm)	
Moldova	Maia Sandu	Direct election, by two-round system (since 2016; previously by parliament, by three-fifths majority)	Unicameral	2001	Semi-presidential republic	
Montenegro	Jakov Milatović	Direct election, by two-round system	Unicameral	1992	One-party state (Part of Yugoslavia, and after Serbia and Montenegro)	
Nepal	Ram Chandra Poudel	Parliament and state legislators	Bicameral	2008 (Note: Under a transitional government between 2006 and 2015; this Transitional Government was responsible to an elected Constituent Assembly, which resolved to establish a republic in 2008.)	Constitutional monarchy	
North Macedonia	Gordana Siljanovska-Davkova	Direct election, by two-round system	Unicameral	1991	One-party state (part of Yugoslavia)	
Pakistan	Asif Ali Zardari	Parliament and state legislators, by instant-runoff vote	Bicameral	2010	Assembly-independent republic	
Poland	Karol Nawrocki	Direct election, by two-round system	Bicameral	1989	One-party state	
Samoa	Tuimalealiifano Va'aletoa Sualauvi II	Parliament	Unicameral	1960	Trust Territory of New Zealand	
Serbia	Aleksandar Vučić	Direct election, by two-round system	Unicameral	1991	One-party state (part of Yugoslavia, and later Serbia and Montenegro)	
Singapore	Tharman Shanmugaratnam	Direct election (since 1993)	Unicameral	1965	State of Malaysia	
Slovakia	Peter Pellegrini	Direct election, by two-round system (since 1999; previously by parliament)	Unicameral	1993	Parliamentary Republic (part of Czechoslovakia)	
Slovenia	Nataša Pirc Musar	Direct election, by two-round system	Bicameral	1991	One-party state (part of Yugoslavia)	
Somalia	Hassan Sheikh Mohamud	Parliament	Bicameral	2012 (Note: Had a transitional government between 1991 and 2012.)	One-party state	
Togo	Jean-Lucien Savi de Tové	Parliament	Bicameral	2024	Presidential republic	
Trinidad and Tobago	Christine Kangaloo	Parliament	Bicameral	1976	Constitutional monarchy (Commonwealth realm)	
Vanuatu	Nikenike Vurobaravu	Parliament and regional council presidents, by majority	Unicameral	1980	British–French condominium (New Hebrides)	
Parliamentary republics with an executive presidency
Country	Head of state	Head of state elected by	Cameral structure	Parliamentary republic with an executive presidency adopted	Previous government form	Notes
Botswana	Duma Boko	Parliament, by majority	Unicameral	1966	British protectorate (Bechuanaland Protectorate)	
Kiribati	Taneti Maamau	Direct election, by first-past-the-post vote	Unicameral	1979	Protectorate	Following a general election, by which citizens elect the members of the House of Assembly, members select from their midst "not less than 3 nor more than 4 candidates" for the presidency. No other person may stand as candidate. The citizens of Kiribati then elect the president from among the proposed candidates with first-past-the-post voting.
Guyana	Irfaan Ali	Semi-direct election, by first-past-the-post vote (vacancies are filled by Parliament, by majority)	Unicameral	1980	Full parliamentary republic	
Marshall Islands	Hilda Heine	Parliament	Bicameral	1979	UN Trust Territory (part of Trust Territory of the Pacific Islands)	
Nauru	David Adeang	Parliament	Unicameral	1968	UN Trusteeship between Australia, New Zealand, and the United Kingdom.	
South Africa	Cyril Ramaphosa	Parliament, by majority	Bicameral	1961	Constitutional monarchy (Commonwealth realm)	Was a full parliamentary republic from 1961–1984; adopted an executive presidency in 1984.
Suriname	Jennifer Geerlings-Simons	Parliament (vacancies are filled by Parliament, by majority)	Unicameral	1987	Full parliamentary republic	Was a full parliamentary republic from 1975–1980; adopted an executive presidency in 1987 after the military coup period from 1980–1987, when the president was given executive powers and the prime minister title became vice-president.

== List of former parliamentary republics and related systems ==
Country	Became a parliamentary republic	Status changed	Changed to	Reason for change	Notes
Full parliamentary republics
SSR Abkhazia	1921	1931	One-party parliamentary republic	Creation of the Abkhaz Autonomous Soviet Socialist Republic	Had a collective head of state with a distinct chairman One-party system under the Communist Party of Abkhazia
Abkhaz ASSR	1931	1991	Full parliamentary republic	Constitutional amendment	Had a collective head of state with a distinct chairman One-party system under the Communist Party of Abkhazia
Abkhazia	1991	1994	Semi-presidential republic	New constitution adopted	
First Republic of Armenia	1918	1920	Multi-party parliamentary republic	Creation of the Armenian Soviet Socialist Republic	
Armenian SSR	1920	1991	Multi-party semi-presidential republic	Constitutional amendment	Had a collective head of state with a distinct chairman until 1990; One-party system under the Communist Party of Armenia
(Austria) First Austrian Republic	1920	1929	Semi-presidential system	Constitutional amendment	
Azerbaijan Democratic Republic	1918	1920	One-party parliamentary republic	Creation of the Azerbaijan Soviet Socialist Republic	
Azerbaijan SSR	1920	1990	Presidential republic	Constitutional amendment	Had a collective head of state with a distinct chairman One-party system under the Communist Party of Azerbaijan
Belarusian Democratic Republic	1918	1920	One-party parliamentary republic	Creation of the Byelorussian Soviet Socialist Republic	
Byelorussian SSR	1920	1991	Full parliamentary republic	Constitutional amendment	Had a collective head of state with a distinct chairman until 1990; One-party system under the Communist Party of Byelorussia
Belarus	1991	1994	Presidential republic	New constitution adopted	
Brazil	1961	1963	Presidential system	Referendum	
Burma (present-day Myanmar)	1948	1962	Military dictatorship	1962 Burmese coup d'état	
Chile	1891	1924	Military junta	1924 Chilean coup d'état	
Chile	1925	1925	Presidential system	New constitution	
Republic of China	1947	1949	One-party parliamentary republic.	Chinese Civil War	One-party system under the Chinese Communist Party (Mainland China). Provisions for parliamentary system "temporarily" suspended during martial law period on Taiwan. 1947 Constitution remains active only on the ROC-controlled territories but amendments in 1991 use the semi-presidential system.
(Czechoslovakia) First Czechoslovak Republic	1920	1939	One-party state	Munich agreement	
(Czechoslovakia) Third Czechoslovak Republic	1945	1948	One-party parliamentary republic	Coup d'état	
(Czechoslovakia) Fourth Czechoslovak Republic	1948	1989	Multi-party parliamentary republic	Velvet Revolution	One-party system under the Communist Party of Czechoslovakia
(Czechoslovakia) Fifth Czechoslovak Republic	1989	1992	State dissolved	Velvet Divorce	
State of East Indonesia	1946	1950	State dissolved	Merged to the Republic of Indonesia	
Republic of Estonia	1920	1934	One-party parliamentary republic	1934 Estonian coup d'état	In June 1940, Estonia was occupied and annexed by the Soviet Union.
Republic of Estonia	1934	1938	One-party presidential republic	New constitution adopted	In June 1940, Estonia was occupied and annexed by the Soviet Union.
(France) French Third Republic	1870	1940	Puppet state	World War II German occupation	
(France) French Fourth Republic	1946	1958	Semi-presidential system	New constitution adopted	
Democratic Republic of Georgia	1918	1921	One-party parliamentary republic	Creation of the Georgian Soviet Socialist Republic and the Socialist Soviet Republic of Abkhazia	
Georgian SSR	1921	1991	Multi-party semi-presidential republic	Constitutional amendment	Had a collective head of state with a distinct chairman until 1990; One-party system under the Communist Party of Georgia
Guyana	1970	1980	Assembly-independent republic	New constitution adopted	
Hungary	1946	1949	One-party state	Creation of the People's Republic of Hungary	
Indonesia	1945	1959	Presidential parliamentary system	Presidential constitution reinstated	
Israel	1948	1996	Semi-parliamentary system	Constitutional amendment	
Democratic Kampuchea	1976	1979	One party parliamentary republic	Capture of Phnom Penh	One-party system under the Communist Party of Kampuchea
People's Republic of Kampuchea	1979	1992	Transitional government, then constitutional monarchy	United Nations Security Council Resolution 745	One-party system under the Kampuchean People's Revolutionary Party
Kenya	2008	2013	Presidential system	New constitution and elections	A separate prime minister existed between 2008 and 2013; The switch to a fully presidential system was legislated in 2010, but only took effect in 2013.
(South Korea) Second Republic of Korea	1960	1961	Military junta	16 May coup	
Kazakh SSR	1936	1990	Presidential republic	Constitutional amendment	Had a collective head of state with a distinct chairman One-party system under the Communist Party of Kazakhstan
Kirghiz SSR	1936	1990	Presidential republic	Constitutional amendment	Had a collective head of state with a distinct chairman One-party system under the Communist Party of Kirghizia
Kyrgyzstan	2010	2021	Presidential republic	Referendum	The 2010 Constitution of Kyrgyzstan introduced a parliamentary system to the country while remaining a de facto semi-presidential republic, with the president retaining many forms of executive powers such as appointing a prime minister as the head of government. The decision was subjected to a parliamentary vote of confidence.
First Republic of Latvia	1922	1934	One-party parliamentary republic	1934 Latvian coup d'état	In June 1940, Latvia was occupied and annexed by the Soviet Union.
First Republic of Latvia	1934	1940	State dissolved	World War II Soviet occupation	In June 1940, Latvia was occupied and annexed by the Soviet Union.
First Republic of Lithuania	1920	1926	One-party state	1926 Lithuanian coup d'état	In June 1940, Lithuania was occupied and annexed by the Soviet Union.
Lithuania	1990	1992	Multi-party semi-presidential republic	New constitution adopted	In February 1993, Lithuania holds its first presidential election since the state re-established.
Moldavian SSR (present-day Moldova)	1940	1990	Multi-party semi-presidential republic	Constitutional amendment	Had a collective head of state with a distinct chairman One-party system under the Communist Party of Moldavia
Nigeria	1963	1966	Military dictatorship (which led in 1979 to the democratic, presidential Second Nigerian Republic)	Coup d'état	
Myanmar	2016	2021	Military dictatorship	2021 Myanmar coup d'état	De jure Assembly-independent republic, de facto Parliamentary republic
Pakistan	1956	1958	Military dictatorship	1958 Pakistani coup d'état	
Pakistan	1973	1977	Military dictatorship	1977 Pakistani coup d'état	
Pakistan	1997	1999	Military dictatorship	1999 Pakistani coup d'état	
Pakistan	2002	2003	Assembly-independent republic	Constitutional amendment	
(Poland) Second Polish Republic	1919	1935	Presidential system	New constitution adopted	
(Portugal) First Portuguese Republic	1911	1926	Military dictatorship (which led in 1933 to the Estado Novo one-party presidential republic)	28 May coup	
(Philippines) First Philippine Republic (Malolos Republic)	1899	1901	Military dictatorship (de facto United States colony)	Capture of Emilio Aguinaldo to the American forces	
(Philippines) Fourth Philippine Republic	1973	1981	Semi-presidential system (de facto military dictatorship under martial law between 1972 and 1986.)	Constitutional amendment	
(Democratic Republic of the Congo) Republic of the Congo	1960	1965	Military dictatorship (De facto one-party state)	1965 Congolese coup d'état	
Rhodesia	1970	1979	Parliamentary system	Creation of Zimbabwe-Rhodesia	Political rights were restricted to the white minority
Russian SFSR	1917	1991	Multi-party semi-presidential republic	Referendum	
Soviet Union	1922	1990	Multi-party semi-presidential republic	Constitutional amendment	Had a collective head of state with a distinct chairman until 1989; One-party system under the Communist Party of the Soviet Union
(Spain) First Spanish Republic	1873	1874	Constitutional monarchy	Restoration of the monarchy	
Second Spanish Republic	1931	1939	One-party state (which declared itself a constitutional monarchy in 1947)	Coup d'état	
Suriname	1975	1987	Assembly-independent republic	New constitution adopted	
Sri Lanka	1972	1978	Semi-presidential system	New constitution adopted	
(Syria) Syrian Republic	1930	1958	State dissolved	Creation of the United Arab Republic	Merged into the United Arab Republic, which operated as a One-party presidential system
(Syria) Syrian Arab Republic	1961	1963	One-party presidential system	1963 Syrian coup d'état	
1991	Semi-presidential system	Constitutional amendment			
(South African Republic) Transvaal Republic	1852	1902	Colony of the British Empire	Second Boer War	
Tajik SSR	1929	1990	Presidential republic	Constitutional amendment	Had a collective head of state with a distinct chairman One-party system under the Communist Party of Tajikistan
Turkey	1923	2018	Presidential system	Referendum	
Turkmen SSR	1925	1990	Presidential republic	Constitutional amendment	Had a collective head of state with a distinct chairman One-party system under the Communist Party of Turkmenistan
Uganda	1963	1966	One-party state	Suspension of the constitution	
Ukrainian People's Republic	1917	1918	Client state	1918 Ukrainian coup d'état	
Ukrainian People's Republic	1918	1919	One-party parliamentary republic	Creation of the Ukrainian Soviet Socialist Republic	
Ukrainian People's Republic	1918	1921	State dissolved	Treaty of Riga	
Ukrainian SSR	1919	1991	Multi-party semi-presidential republic	Constitutional amendment	Had a collective head of state with a distinct chairman until 1990; One-party system under the Communist Party of Ukraine
Uzbek SSR	1924	1990	Presidential republic	Constitutional amendment	Had a collective head of state with a distinct chairman One-party system under the Communist Party of Uzbekistan
Yugoslavia	1945	1953	Parliamentary republic with an executive presidency	Constitutional amendment	Had a collective head of state with a distinct chairman One-party system under the Communist Party of Yugoslavia
Zimbabwe Rhodesia	1979	1979	Dependent territory	Reversion to Southern Rhodesia	
Zimbabwe	1980	1987	Presidential system	Constitutional amendment	
Parliamentary republics with an executive presidency
Country	Became a parliamentary republic with an executive presidency	Status changed	Changed to	Reason for change	Notes
Gambia	1970	1982	Presidential system	Constitutional amendment	The president was elected semi-directly by a constituency-based double simultaneous vote, with vacancies filled by Parliament; a motion of no confidence automatically entailed snap parliamentary elections. Presidential elections were made fully direct and separate from parliamentary elections in 1982.
Indonesia	1959	2001	Presidential system	Constitutional amendment	As defined by the original Constitution of 1945 (reinstated under the Presidential Decree of 5 July 1959), this was finally changed during the amendments of 2001, occurring just months after the ousting of Abdurrahman Wahid. The first direct presidential election was held in 2004.
Iran	1979	1989	Presidential system under an Islamic theocracy	Constitutional amendment	The Supreme Leader of Iran was established on 3 December 1979 following the Iranian Revolution to function as the country's head of state. Both the president and prime minister, which was retained under the former monarchy, were simultaneously the co-heads of government, but they answer to the Supreme Leader. The post of the prime minister was dropped in 1989 leaving the president as the sole head of government.
Kenya	1964	2008	Full parliamentary system	Coalition and power-sharing	Originally, the president was elected semi-directly by a constituency-based double simultaneous vote, with vacancies filled by Parliament; a motion of no confidence automatically entailed either the resignation of the president or snap parliamentary elections. Presidential elections were made fully direct in 1969, including after a vacancy, but their schedule remained linked to the parliamentary elections. A separate prime minister existed between 2008 and 2013.
Yugoslavia	1953	1963	Assembly-independent republic	New constitution	One-party system under the League of Communists of Yugoslavia
Assembly-independent systems
Country	Became an assembly- independent republic	Status changed	Changed to	Reason for change	Notes
First Republic of Ghana	1960	1966	Military dictatorship (Which led to the fully parliamentary Second Republic of Ghana)	Coup d'état	
Pakistan	1985	1997	Full parliamentary republic	Constitutional amendment	
Pakistan	2003	2010	Full parliamentary republic	Constitutional amendment	
Serbia and Montenegro	1992	2000	Semi-presidential republic	Constitutional amendment	
Tanganyika	1962	1964	State dissolved	Creation of the United Republic of Tanzania	Merged into the United Republic of Tanzania, which operated as a One-party presidential system
Yugoslavia	1963	1980	Directorial republic	New constitution and the death of Josip Broz Tito	One-party system under the League of Communists of Yugoslavia; The change to a directorial system was legislated in 1973, but only took effect in 1980.
Directorial systems
Yugoslavia	1980	1992	—	Breakup of Yugoslavia	One-party system under the League of Communists of Yugoslavia

== See also ==
- List of countries by system of government
- Constitutional monarchy
- Parliamentary system
- Republic
- Republicanism
- Semi-presidential system
- Semi-parliamentary system
- Parliamentary republics with an executive presidency
