= Abkhazia conflict =

1989–present conflict in the South Caucasus

- Part of Dissolution of the Soviet Union and post-Soviet conflicts
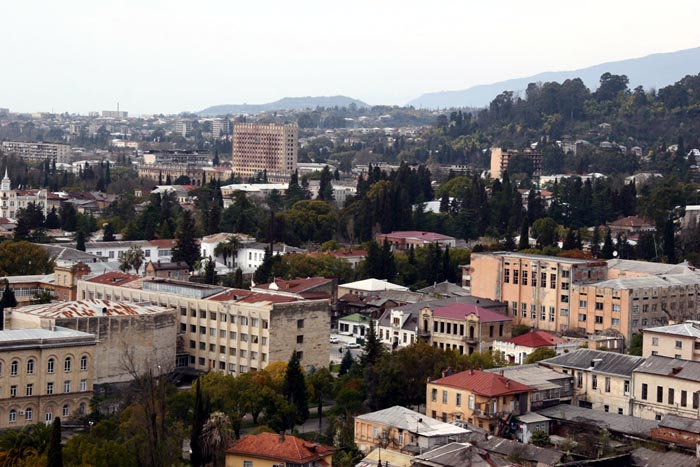
- Sukhumi with the burned-out Government House of Abkhazia in the background, 2006
Date	18 March 1989 – present
Location	Abkhazia, Georgia
Status	Ongoing; frozen conflict
Territorial changes	Abkhazia becomes a de facto independent republic, but remains internationally recognized as part of Georgia

Belligerents
Abkhazia (Note: Abkhaz ASSR before 1992.); CMPC (1992–1993); Russia	(Georgia (country)) Georgia (Note: Georgian SSR before 1990.); UNA-UNSO (1992–1993) (Chechen Republic of Ichkeria) Chechen militants (2001)

Commanders and leaders
(Abkhaz Autonomous Soviet Socialist Republic) Valerian Kobakhia; (Abkhaz Autonomous Soviet Socialist Republic) (Abkhazia) Vladislav Ardzinba; (Abkhazia) Sergei Bagapsh #; (Abkhazia) Alexander Ankvab; (Abkhazia) Raul Khajimba; (Abkhazia) Aslan Bzhania; (Abkhazia) Badra Gunba; Shamil Basayev; Sultan Sosnaliyev #; Musa Shanibov #; (Russia) Boris Yeltsin #; (Russia) Dmitry Medvedev; (Russia) Vladimir Putin; Killed senior commanders: (Abkhazia) Yassin Zelimkhanov †; (Abkhazia) Anatoly Zaitsev †; (Abkhazia) Boris Pachulia †; Gena Kardanov †	(Georgian Soviet Socialist Republic) Jumber Patiashvili; (Georgian Soviet Socialist Republic) Givi Gumbaridze; Zviad Gamsakhurdia (DOW); Eduard Shevardnadze #; (Chechen Republic of Ichkeria) Ruslan Gelayev; (Georgia (country)) Mikheil Saakashvili; (Georgia (country)) Giorgi Margvelashvili; (Georgia (country)) Salome Zourabichvili; (Georgia (country)) Mikheil Kavelashvili; Killed senior commanders: (Georgia (country)) Geno Adamia † (Georgia (country)) Zhiuli Shartava † (Georgia (country)) Zurab Samushia † Dato Shengelia † (Georgia (country)) Guram Gabiskiria (executed) (Georgia (country)) Mamia Alasania (executed) (Georgia (country)) (Georgia (country)) Tengiz Kitovani #

Casualties and losses
1992–1993: 12,000; 1998: 25–300; 2008: 3	1992–1993: 14,000 250,000 displaced 1998: 103-160, 35,000-40,000 displaced 2008: 2,192
- 18 killed 448 injured in 1989; 40 killed in 2001

The Abkhazia conflict is a territorial dispute over Abkhazia, a region on the eastern coast of the Black Sea in the South Caucasus, at the intersection of Eastern Europe and Western Asia. The conflict involves Georgia, the Russian Federation and the Russian-backed self-proclaimed Republic of Abkhazia, which is internationally recognised only by Russia, Venezuela, Nicaragua and Syria; Georgia and all other United Nations members consider Abkhazia a sovereign territory of Georgia. However, Georgia lacks de facto control over the territory.

The beginning of the conflict dates back to the dissolution of the Soviet Union in 1991; however, the dispute can be traced to 1918–1919 Abkhazia conflict over Sukhumi okrug (which corresponds to the Abkhazia region) between the Georgian Democratic Republic, White Russia and the Russian SFSR. Since 1989, the conflict has involved several wars: the 1992–1993 War in Abkhazia, the 1998 War in Abkhazia and the 2008 Russo-Georgian War.

The conflict, one of the bloodiest in the post-Soviet era, remains unresolved. The Georgian government has offered substantial autonomy to Abkhazia several times. However, both the Abkhaz government and the opposition in Abkhazia refuse any form of union with Georgia. Abkhaz regard their independence as the result of a war of liberation from Georgia, while Georgians believe that historically Abkhazia has always formed part of Georgia. Georgians formed the single largest ethnic group in pre-1993 Abkhazia, with a 45.7% plurality as of 1989. During the war the Abkhaz separatist side carried out an ethnic cleansing campaign which resulted in the expulsion of up to 250,000 and in the killing of more than 5,000 ethnic Georgians. The Organization for Security and Co-operation in Europe (OSCE) conventions of Lisbon, Budapest and Istanbul have officially recognized the ethnic cleansing of Georgians, which UN General Assembly Resolution GA/10708 also mentions. The UN Security Council has passed a series of resolutions in which it appeals for a cease-fire.

== Background ==
The written history of Abkhazia largely begins with the colonization by Ancient Greeks of its coast in the 6th-5th centuries BC. During this time, the territory was part of the western Georgian kingdom of Colchis (Egrisi). During the Antiquity, various tribes were recorded on the territory today known as Abkhazia: Moschi, Sanigs, Misimians, Apsilae and Abasgois. Moschi, Sanigs and Misimians were known to have Georgian (Kartvelian) origin, while origin of Apsilae and Abasgois is disputed, with some scholars considering them to be Kartvelian tribes, while others regard them as being ancestors of people today called as Abkhazians. Throughout Antiquity, the territory was controlled by Pontus, the Roman Empire, and the Byzantine Empire. Local tribes played a huge role in the consolidation of local population into a single unit. They managed to break free from the Byzantine Empire in the 8th century and establish their independent kingdom. During this time, the term "Apkhazeti" first appeared in the Georgian annals, which is of Mingrelian (Western Georgian) origin, "Apkha" meaning back or shoulder. The term gave rise to the name "Abkhazia", which is used today in most foreign languages. It was used to denote whole Abasgia (Byzantine name for the territory). The medieval Kingdom of Abkhazia managed to unite whole Western Georgia into a single political entity and transferred its capital to the Georgian city of Kutaisi. Although the origin of this kingdom's ruling family is still disputed, most scholars agree that the Abkhazian kings were Georgian in culture and language. The kingdom is frequently referred in modern history writing as the Egrisi-Abkhazian kingdom due to the fact that medieval authors viewed the new monarchy as a successor state of Egrisi and sometimes used the terms interchangeably. In order to eliminate the Byzantine religious influence, the dynasty subordinated the local dioceses to the Georgian Orthodox patriarchate of Mtskheta.

In the 10th century, Kingdom of Abkhazia played an important role in the unification of the Georgian realm. Through dynastic succession, Bagrat Bagrationi united Kingdom of Abkhazia, Southern Georgian Kingdom of the Iberians and Eastern Georgian territories of Kartli under a single political entity, Kingdom of Georgia. Duchy of Tskhumi was established on the territory of Abkhazia, which later was transformed into Duchy of Abkhazia. The Kingdom became the largest entity in the Caucasus by the 12th century. However, in the late 15th century, the civil strife within the Kingdom of Georgia led to its dissolution. Various new Georgian kingdoms arose in its place, such as Kingdom of Kakheti and Kingdom of Kartli in the Eastern Georgia, Samtskhe-Saatabago in the Southern Georgia and Kingdom of Imereti in the Western Georgia. The latter consisted of three principalities: Principality of Mingrelia, Principality of Guria and Principality of Abkhazia. Eventually Kingdom of Imereti declined due to power struggle within its ruling elites and constant Ottoman invasions, leading to these principalities gaining semi-independent status as they frequently acted independently and at times titled themselves as kings. In the 1570s, the Ottoman navy occupied the fort of Tskhumi on the Abkhazian coastline, turning it into the Turkish fortress of Suhum-Kale (hence, the modern name of the city of Sukhumi). In 1555, Georgia and the whole South Caucasus became divided between the Ottoman and Safavid Persian empires per the Peace of Amasya, with Abkhazia, along with all of western Georgia, remaining in the hands of the Ottomans. As a result, Abkhazia came under the increasing influence of Turkey and Islam, gradually losing its cultural and religious ties with the rest of Georgia. According to the Soviet historical science, Turkey, after the conquest aimed at obliterating the material and spiritual culture of Abkhazia and forcibly converting the population to Islam.

== Conflict in 1918–1920 ==
Following the Russian Revolutions, Georgia initially joined the Transcaucasian Democratic Federative Republic and subsequently became independent as the Democratic Republic of Georgia (DRG) governed by Georgian Mensheviks, while Abkhazia fell under control of a group of local Bolsheviks and the Red Army of Russia following a Bolshevik-led rebellion against the local Abkhazian self-government, Abkhaz People's Council (APC). This forced the APC to request aid from the Democratic Republic of Georgia, which ousted the Bolshevik rebels in Sokhumi with the National Guard of Georgia. Abkhazia joined Democratic Republic of Georgia as an autonomous entity. This later led to the conflict between Georgia and Soviet Russia over ownership of Abkhazia and the territories of the former Black Sea Governorate (Sochi conflict). Georgia managed to repulse the Red Army from Abkhazia but conceded to Russian claims over Sochi and Tuapse. In 1920, Psou river was agreed as a new state border between Soviet Russia and Georgia. This corresponds to the modern internationally recognized Georgia–Russia border. In 1921, Abkhazia was granted the status of the autonomy within the Georgian Democratic Republic.

In 1921, the Red Army invaded Georgia and toppled the Menshevik government of the DRG. Georgian Soviet Socialist Republic (GSSR) was established under Bolshevik government, which was later incorporated into the USSR. In exchange for support for Bolsheviks in Abkhazia, the Soviet government agreed to increase the autonomy of Abkhazia. In 1921, Socialist Soviet Republic of Abkhazia was created. However, it was not separate from Georgia and its status was defined as a treaty republic of GSSR. In 1931, status of Abkhazia was again downgraded to the autonomous republic, with Abkhaz Autonomous Soviet Socialist Republic being established.

== The late Soviet era conflict ==
Tensions between Abkhazians and Georgians began to escalate in 1980s as Georgians increasingly pushed for independence from the Soviet Union, while Abkhazians wanted to remain in the Soviet Union. On 18 March 1989, a group of Abkhazian intellectuals wrote letter to the Kremlin, expressing their desire to upgrade the status of Abkhazia to independent SSR within the Soviet Union or join Russia as an autonomous republic. This is known as Lykhny appeal. According to the 1979 Soviet Census, Georgians made up 45.7% of the population of Abkhazia, while Abkhazians were 17.8%. In response to the appeal, the Georgian anti-Soviet groups organized a series of unsanctioned meetings across Georgia, claiming that the Soviet government was using Abkhaz separatism in order to oppose the Georgia's pro-independence movement. The peaceful demonstration in Tbilisi was suppressed by the Soviet Army on 9 April 1989, which is known today as April 9 tragedy. In July 1989, the riots started in Abkhazia with the Abkhaz protest against an opening of a branch of Tbilisi State University in Sukhumi, and concluded with the looting of the Georgian school which was expected to house the new university on 16 July 1989. The ensuing violence quickly degenerated into a large-scale inter-ethnic confrontation. The first case of inter-ethnic violence in Georgia, it effectively marked the start of the Georgian-Abkhaz conflict.

The July events in Abkhazia left at least 18 dead and 448 injured, of whom, according to official accounts, 302 were Georgians. The local Abkhaz authorities endeavored to regulate the flow of information by censoring newspaper articles and television programs deemed to threaten the peace of multiethnic autonomy. On August 15, 1990, the Georgian section of Abkhazian radio appealed to the chairman of the Ministerial Council to safeguard the rights and freedoms of expression. In response to this appeal, the Abkhaz authorities imposed a ban on radio broadcasts concerning the Georgian language and interfered with the editorial policies of journalists. Although the government managed to end the violence and maintain peace at that time, the conflict developed further and resulted in the next years in what is often referred as "war of laws". In 1991, Georgia refused to take part in referendum to preserve the Soviet Union as a renewed federation, opting to hold an independence referendum, which led to a declaration of independence. However, Abkhazia defied Tbilisi and took part in the Soviet referendum, which was boycotted by the Georgian population of Abkhazia.

In order to defuse tensions, newly elected Georgian president Zviad Gamsakhurdia agreed on an arrangement to grant a wide over-representation to the Abkhazians in the local Supreme Council, with Abkhazians, while being only 18% of the population, getting the largest portion of seats. According to this settlement, the 65 seats in the Supreme Soviet were allocated to different ethnic groups; 28 were reserved for Abkhazians, 26 for Georgians (46% of the total population) and 11 for the other ethnic groups. The elections were held in September 1991 and resulted in Vladislav Ardzinba being appointed as Chairman of the Abkhazian Supreme Council. Ardzinba, who was a charismatic but excitable figure popular among the Abkhaz, was believed by Georgians to have helped to instigate the anti-Georgian violence of July 1989. Ardzinba exploited the Georgian Civil War which began in December 1991 to consolidate his power and launched a practice of replacing ethnic Georgians in leading positions with the Abkhaz. Ardzinba created the Abkhazian National Guard that was mono-ethnically Abkhaz, and on 24 June 1992, attacked the building of the Abkhazian Interior Ministry, a last stronghold of Georgian authority in Abkhazia, severely beating the ethnic Georgian minister Givi Lominadze and installing Abkhaz Alexander Ankvab. These events led to a split in the Supreme Council between Georgian and Abkhazian factions and forced the Georgian faction to boycott the sessions. In turn, On 23 July 1992, the Abkhazian faction of the Supreme Council, without a quorum, passed a resolution on restoring the 1925 Abkhazian constitution, declaring a "sovereign state" from Georgia. On 25 July 1992, State Council of the Republic of Georgia, a governing body of Georgia at that time, responded with a special resolution, which nullified this declaration, with Georgian leader Eduard Shevardnadze pointing out that the separatist decision contradicted the opinion of the majority of Abkhazian population. Meanwhile, the Abkhaz leader Vladislav Ardzinba intensified his ties with hard-line Russian politicians and military elite and declared he was ready for a war with Georgia. Russia used Abkhaz and also South Ossetian separatists as its ethnically based proxies to inflame ethnic conflicts in Georgia, undermine Georgian independence and assert Russia's control over the strategically important South Caucasus.

== War in Abkhazia ==
The conflict eventually devolved into a war, which lasted for 13 months, beginning in August, 1992, with Georgian government forces and a militia composed of ethnic Georgians who lived in Abkhazia and separatist forces consisting of ethnic Abkhazians and Armenians who also lived in Abkhazia. The separatists were supported by the North Caucasian and Cossack militants and (unofficially) by Russian forces stationed in Gudauta. The conflict resulted in the ethnic cleansing of Georgians in Abkhazia. The agreement in Moscow ended hostilities in 1994, however, this would not last.

== Resumption of hostilities ==
In April–May 1998, the conflict escalated once again in the Gali District when several hundred Abkhaz forces entered the villages still populated by Georgians to support the separatist-held parliamentary elections. Despite criticism from the opposition, Eduard Shevardnadze, President of Georgia, refused to deploy troops against Abkhazia. A ceasefire was negotiated on May 20. The hostilities resulted in hundreds of casualties from both sides and an additional 20,000 Georgian refugees.

In September 2001, around 400 Chechen fighters and 80 Georgian guerrillas appeared in the Kodori Valley. The Chechen-Georgian paramilitaries advanced as far as Sukhumi, but finally were repelled by the Abkhazian forces.

== Saakashvili era ==
The new Georgian government of President Mikheil Saakashvili promised not to use force and to resolve the problem only by diplomacy and political talks.

Georgia decried the unlimited issuing of Russian passports in Abkhazia with subsequent payment of retirement pensions and other monetary benefits by Russia, which Georgia considers to be economic support of separatists by the Russian government.

In May 2006 the Coordinating Council of Georgia's Government and Abkhaz separatists was convened for the first time since 2001. In late July the 2006 Kodori crisis erupted, resulting in the establishment of the de jure Government of Abkhazia in Kodori. For the first time after the war, this government was located in Abkhazia, and it was headed by Malkhaz Akishbaia, Temur Mzhavia and Ada Marshania.

On May 15, 2008 United Nations General Assembly adopted a resolution recognising the right of all refugees to return to Abkhazia and reclaim their property rights. It regretted the attempts to alter pre-war demographic composition and called for the "rapid development of a timetable to ensure the prompt voluntary return of all refugees and internally displaced persons to their homes."

== August 2008 ==
On August 10, 2008, the Russo-Georgian War spread to Abkhazia, where separatist rebels and the Russian air force launched an all-out attack on Georgian forces. Abkhazia's pro-Moscow separatist President Sergei Bagapsh said that his troops had launched a major "military operation" to force Georgian troops out of the Kodori Gorge, which they still controlled. As a result of this attack, Georgian troops were driven out of Abkhazia entirely.

On August 26, 2008, the Russian Federation officially recognized both South Ossetia and Abkhazia as independent states.

In response to Russia's recognition of Abkhazia and South Ossetia, the Georgian government announced that the country cut all diplomatic relations with Russia and that it left the Commonwealth of Independent States.

== After the 2008 war ==
Relations between Georgia and Abkhazia have remained tense after the war. Georgia has moved to increase Abkhazia's isolation by imposing a sea blockade of Abkhazia. During the opening ceremony of a new building of the Georgian Embassy in Kyiv (Ukraine) in November 2009, Georgian president Mikheil Saakashvili stated that residents of South Ossetia and Abkhazia could also use its facilities. "I would like to assure you, my dear friends, that this is your home, as well, and here you will always be able to find support and understanding", he said.

On July 9, 2012, the OSCE Parliamentary Assembly passed a resolution at its annual session in Monaco, underlining Georgia's territorial integrity and referring to breakaway Abkhazia and South Ossetia as occupied territories. The resolution "urges the Government and the Parliament of the Russian Federation, as well as the de facto authorities of Abkhazia, Georgia and South Ossetia, Georgia, to allow the European Union Monitoring Mission unimpeded access to the occupied territories." It also said that the OSCE Parliamentary Assembly was "concerned about the humanitarian situation of the displaced persons both in Georgia and in the occupied territories of Abkhazia, Georgia and South Ossetia, Georgia, as well as the denial of the right of return to their places of living."

In 2016, murder of ethnic Georgian Giga Otkhozoria by Abkhaz border guards caused international resonance and raised question about human rights situation of ethnic Georgians remaining in Abkhazia, particularly Gali district, where 98% are ethnic Georgians and are often subject to ethnic discrimination, denial of political and civil rights and police misconduct.

== See also ==
- Abkhazia–Georgia border
- Georgian–Ossetian conflict
- Russo-Georgian War
- Politics of Abkhazia
- Transnistria conflict
- Women's Peace Train

== Bibliography ==
- Chervonnaya, Svetlana (1994), Conflict in the Caucasus: Georgia, Abkhazia and the Russian Shadow, translated by Ariane Chanturia, Glastonbury, United Kingdom: Gothic Image Publications, ISBN 978-0-90-636230-3
- Cornell, Svante E. (2001), Small Nations and Great Powers: A Study of Ethnopolitical Conflict in the Caucasus, London: Curzon Press, ISBN 978-0-70-071162-8
- Cornell, Svante E.; Starr, S. Frederick (2009), The Guns of August 2008: Russia's War in Georgia, Armok, New York: M.E. Sharpe, ISBN 978-0-76-562508-3
- Derluguian, Georgi M. (1998), "The Tale of Two Resorts: Abkhazia and Ajaria Before and Since the Soviet Collapse", in Crawford, Beverley; Lipshutz, Ronnie D. (eds.), The Myth of "Ethnic Conflict": Politics, Economics, and "Cultural" Violence, Berkeley, California: University of California Press, pp. 261–292, ISBN 978-0-87-725198-9
- Hewitt, B.G. (1993), "Abkhazia: a problem of identity and ownership", Central Asian Survey, 12 (3): 267–323, doi:10.1080/02634939308400819
- Hewitt, George (2013), Discordant Neighbours: A Reassessment of the Georgian-Abkhazian and Georgian-South Ossetian Conflicts, Leiden, The Netherlands: Brill, ISBN 978-9-00-424892-2
- Kaufman, Stuart J. (2001), Modern Hatreds: The Symbolic Politics of Ethnic War, Ithaca, New York: Cornell University Press, ISBN 0-8014-8736-6
- Lakoba, Stanislav (1995), "Abkhazia is Abkhazia", Central Asian Survey, 14 (1): 97–105, doi:10.1080/02634939508400893
- Rayfield, Donald (2012), Edge of Empires: A History of Georgia, London: Reaktion Books, ISBN 978-1-78-023030-6
- Saparov, Arsène (2015), From Conflict to Autonomy in the Caucasus: The Soviet Union and the making of Abkhazia, South Ossetia and Nagorno Karabakh, New York City: Routledge, ISBN 978-0-41-565802-7
- Suny, Ronald Grigor (1994), The Making of the Georgian Nation (Second ed.), Bloomington, Indiana: Indiana University Press, ISBN 978-0-25-320915-3
- Welt, Cory (2012), "A Fateful Moment: Ethnic Autonomy and Revolutionary violence in the Democratic Republic of Georgia (1918–1921)", in Jones, Stephen F. (ed.), The Making of Modern Georgia, 1918 – 2012: The first Georgian Republic and its successors, New York City: Routledge, pp. 205–231, ISBN 978-0-41-559238-3
- Zürcher, Christoph (2007), The Post-Soviet Wars: Rebellion, Ethnic Conflict, and Nationhood in the Caucasus, New York City: New York University Press, ISBN 978-0-81-479709-9
