= Abkhaz Regional Committee of the Communist Party of the Soviet Union =

The First Secretary of the Abkhaz regional branch of the Communist Party of the Soviet Union was the position of highest authority in the SSR Abkhazia (1921–1931) and the Abkhaz ASSR (1931–1991) in the Georgian SSR of the Soviet Union. The position was created on February 14, 1921, and abolished in 1991. The First Secretary was a de facto appointed position usually by the Politburo or the General Secretary himself.

== List of First Secretaries of the Communist Party of Abkhazia ==
| Name | Term of Office | | Life years |
| Name | Start | End | Life years |
Chairman of the Organization Bureau
| N.E. Zhvaniya | February 14, 1921 | 1921 | |
First Secretaries of the Communist Party
| G. Krishtof | March 29, 1921 | 1921 | |
| Pyotr Agniashvili (Agniev) | 1921 | 1921 | 1898–1937 |
| Larionov | 1921 | 1921 | |
| Nikolay Svanidze | September 1921 | January 1922 | 1895–1937 |
| S.A. Gubeliya-Mezdmarishvili | 1922 | 1922 | |
| Nikolay Akirtava | 1922 | 1923 | 1894–1937 |
| G.M. Makarov | 1923 | 1924 | |
| Yervand Asribekov | April 1924 | January 1925 | 1898–1937 |
| Georgy Sturua | 1925 | 1927 | 1884–1956 |
| Aleksand Amas (Amirbekov) | 1928 | 1929 | 1904–1938 |
| Pavel Meladze | 1929 | 1930 | 1898–1937 |
| Vladimir Ladariya | 1930 | January 17, 1936 | 1900–1937 |
| Aleksey Agrba | January 17, 1936 | February 18, 1937 | 1897–1938 |
| Kirill Bechvaya (Note: Acting to June 1938) | 1937 | 1940 | 1903–? |
| Mikhail Baramiya | 1940 | February 20, 1943 | 1905–? |
| Akaki Mgeladze | February 20, 1943 | November 1951 | 1910–1980 |
| Shota Getiya | December 1951 | April 21, 1953 | 1904–? |
| Grigory Karchava | April 21, 1953 | October 2, 1953 | 1907–? |
| Georgy Gegeshidze | October 2, 1953 | January 1956 | 1924–1971 |
| Otar Gotsiridze | January 1956 | 1958 | 1919– |
| Mikhail Bgazhba | February 1958 | September 1965 | 1915–1993 |
| Valerian Kobakhia | September 1965 | 1975 | 1929–1992 |
| Valery Khintba | 1975 | February 1978 | 1940– |
| Boris Adlejba | February 1978 | April 6, 1989 | 1931–1990 |
| Vladimir Khishba | April 1989 | 1991 | 1936– |

== See also ==
- Socialist Soviet Republic of Abkhazia
- Abkhaz Autonomous Soviet Socialist Republic

== Sources ==
- WorldStatesmen.org
