= 1991 Abkhazian New Union Treaty referendum =

- 17 March 1991
- Do you consider it necessary to preserve the Union of Soviet Socialist Republics as a renewed federation of equal sovereign republics, in which the rights and freedoms of a person of any nationality will be fully guaranteed?

Results
Choice	Votes	%
Yes	164,231	99.06%
No	1,566	0.94%
Valid votes	165,797	99.55%
Invalid or blank votes	747	0.45%
Total votes	166,544	100.00%
Registered voters/turnout	318,317	52.32%

A referendum on the New Union Treaty was held in Abkhazia on 17 March 1991, as part of the wider Soviet referendum. The treaty was approved by 99.06% of voters.

== Background ==
The treaty would have reorganised the Soviet Union into a less centralised state. However, it was largely boycotted by the Georgian population in Abkhazia, whilst in Georgia no referendum was held.

== Results ==
Choice	Votes	%
For	164,231	99.06
Against	1,566	0.94
Total	165,797	100.00
Valid votes	165,797	99.55
Invalid/blank votes	747	0.45
Total votes	166,544	100.00
Registered voters/turnout	318,317	52.32
Source: RRC

== Aftermath ==
The Union Treaty was approved in the republics where referendums were held, but its coming into effect was prevented by the August 1991 coup attempt and the subsequent dissolution of the Soviet Union on 26 December.

The fact that voters in Abkhazia approved the new union treaty while the Georgian SSR declared its independence on 9 April has been used by Abkhazia as an argument that Georgia became de jure independent from the Soviet Union without Abkhazia, which was then free to choose its own future.
