= Larionov =

Larionov (Russian: Ларио́нов; masculine) or Larionova (Ларио́нова; feminine) is a common Russian surname originating from the masculine given name Hilarion. The surname is shared by the following people:

- Alla Larionova (1931–2000), Russian theater and film actress
- Anna Larionova (born 1975), retired Russian Olympic alpine skier
- Dmitry Larionov (born 1985), Russian slalom canoer
- Igor Larionov (born 1960), Russian ice hockey player
- Ivan Larionov (1830–1889), Russian composer, writer and folklorist
- Mikhail Larionov (1881–1964), Russian avant-garde painter
- Mira Larionova, Russian para swimmer
- Nikita Larionov (1932–2014), Russian writer and poet
- Nikolay Larionov (born 1957), Russian association football player
- Olga Larionova (born 1935), pen name of Olga Tideman, Soviet/Russian science fiction writer
- Stanislav Larionov (born 1976), Russian futsal player and coach
- Tatiana Larionova (born 1955), Russian politician
- Vadim Larionov (born 1996), Russian football player
- Vsevolod Larionov (1928–2000), Russian film and television actor
- Yekaterina Larionova (born 1994), freestyle wrestler from Kazakhstan
- Yuliya Larionova (born 1984), Azerbaijani football referee and former player
- Yuri Larionov (born 1986), Russian pairs figure skater
