= Council of Nationalities =

Council of Nationalities, Soviet of Nationalities, etc. may refer to the following organizations in the Soviet Union and Russia:

- Council of nationalities of the People's Commissariat for Nationalities of the RSFSR
- Department of nationalities of the Presidium of VTsIK, often called simply Department of nationalities of VTsIK
- Council of nationalities of the Central Executive Committee of the Soviet Union
- Soviet of Nationalities, upper chamber of the Supreme Soviet of the Soviet Union (1938–1991)
- Soviet of Nationalities (Supreme Soviet of Russia) (1990–1993), parliamentary chamber
