= Demographics of Abkhazia =

The demographics of Abkhazia include population density, ethnicity, education level, health, socioeconomic status, religious affiliations and other aspects of the population.

== Size ==
The exact present size of Abkhazia's population is disputed. According to the 2011 census it measured 240,705 people, but this is contested by Georgian authorities. The Department of Statistics of Georgia estimated Abkhazia's population to be approximately 179,000 in 2003, and 178,000 in 2005 (the last year when such estimates were published in Georgia).

Encyclopædia Britannica estimates the population in 2007 at 180,000 and the International Crisis Group estimates Abkhazia's total population in 2006 to be between 157,000 and 190,000 (or between 180,000 and 220,000 as estimated by United Nations Development Program in 1998).

The size of Abkhazia's population more than halved due to the 1992–1993 war – at the time of the 1989 census it had measured 525,061.

== Vital statistics ==
Year	Average population	Live births	Deaths	Natural change	Crude birth rate (per 1000)	Crude death rate (per 1000)	Natural change (per 1000)
2002		1,557	1,059	498	7.3	5.0	2.3
2003	214,016	1,816	1,142	674	8.5	5.3	3.2
2004	217,281	1,919	1,233	686	8.9	5.8	3.1
2005	223,847	1,669	1,533	136	7.7	7.1	0.6
2006	223,847	1,715	1,493	222	7.9	6.9	1.0
2007	227,204	1,772	1,761	11	8.2	8.2	0.0
2008	230,611	1,990	1,553	437	9.2	7.2	2.0
2009	234,069	2,207	1,699	508	10.2	7.8	2.4
2010	237,579	2,156	1,699	457	8.9	7.0	1.9
2011	240,705	2,143	1,645	498	8.9	6.8	2.1
2012	241,414	2,258	1,723	535	9.3	7.1	2.2
2013	242,028	2,017	1,561	456	8.3	6.4	1.9
2014	242,756	2,004	1,467	543	8.2	6.0	2.2
2015	243,206	1,927	1,654	273	7.9	6.8	1.1
2016	243,564	1,768	1,465	303	7.2	6.0	1.2
2017	243,936	1,711	1,262	449	7.0	5.2	1.8
2018	244,832	1,430	1,282	148	5.8	5.2	0.6
2019	245,246	1,274	1,240	34	5.2	5.1	0.1
2020	245,424	1,295	1,411	−116	5.3	5.8	−0.5
2021	244,926	1,110	1,785	−675			
2022		997	1,532	−535			
2023		897	1,259	−362			
2024		1,261	1,251	+10			

== Ethnic composition ==
The population of Abkhazia remains ethnically very diverse, even after the 1992–1993 War. As of 2011 the population of Abkhazia is made up of ethnic Abkhaz (50.71%), Georgians (mostly Mingrelians) (17.93%), Hamshen Armenians (17.39%), Russians (9.17%) and Greeks (0.6%).

=== Historical developments ===
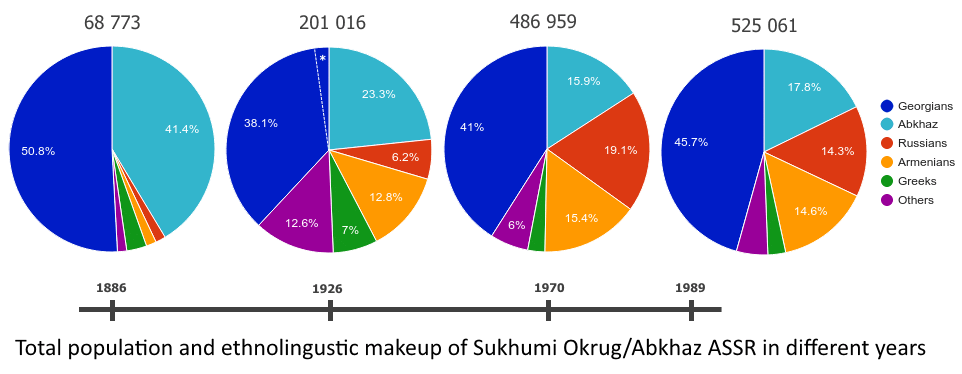
Ethnolinguistic makeup of Sukhumi Okrug-Abkhazian ASSR in different years. Samurzakanians are grouped with Georgians in 1886 which is disputed (see the article text for details)

The demographics of Abkhazia were affected by the Caucasus War and subsequent forced expulsion and migration of Muslim Abkhaz, Russian policy of settling Georgians, Russians and others in Abkhazia and by the 1992–1993 war, which saw the ethnic cleansing of Georgians in Abkhazia. Prior to the war, ethnic Georgians made up 45.7% of Abkhazia's population of 525,061, however, by 1993, most Georgians and some Russians and Armenians had fled Abkhazia or had been ethnically cleansed. The ethnic composition of Abkhazia in past and current times plays a central role in the Georgian-Abkhazian conflict.

The earliest reliable records for Abkhazia are the Family Lists compiled in 1886, according to which the Sukhum Okrug (district of the Kutais Governorate of the Caucasus Viceroyalty of the Russian Empire) population was 68,773 of which 4,166 were Georgians (3,558 Mingrelians), 28,323 Abkhaz, 30,640 Samurzakanians, 2,149 Greeks, 1,090 Armenians, 1,090 Russians, 637 Estonians.

"It is in any case easy to see that, and why, the Samurzaq’anians are the bone of contention between Abkhaz and Georgians. According to the Family Lists, they were actually the most numerous group of all. Some (pro-)Abkhaz scholars have stated the percentage of Abkhaz in Abkhazia for 1886 to have been 85.7%; that clearly is an addition of Abkhaz plus Samurzaq’anoans (30,640 + 28,323 = 58,963 or 85.7% of 68,773). On the other hand, some (pro-)Georgian scholars have claimed that actually they, the 'Georgians', were in a majority of 50.6%, clearly arriving at this by adding all Kartvelians (Mingrelians [and some Laz for Sukhum town] + Georgians [including Imeretians and Gurians] to the Samurzaq’anoans (30,640 + 3,558 + 515 + 84 + 9 = 34,806 or 50.6% of 68,773). Presentation of figures should always be supported by explanation of how they are calculated. While the (pro-)Abkhaz may be criticized for the form they choose, they are quite justified in the essence: the very source itself compiles additional summary tables, and in these, Samurzaq’anoans are not listed, but the number of Abkhaz in Kutaisskaja Gubernija is given as 60,432. Now, in Batumi (city and okrug), 1,469 Abkhaz were listed; thus 58,963 remain – clearly, these are the Abkhaz plus the Samurzaq’anoans in our okrug! Besides the proof offered by the table, we have additional evidence in the fact that Samurzaq’anoans and Abkhaz are kept apart quite neatly. Only in two villages in Gumista, far from Samurzaq’an(o), are both listed side by side; elsewhere, it is either one or the other: Abkhaz in the rest of Gumista, in Gudauta and in K’odor (minus one large village of Samurzaq’anoans with no Abkhaz), Samurzaq’anoans in Samurzaq’an(o). Clearly the authorities had trouble distinguishing Abkhaz and Samurzaq’anoans, (Note: One bibliographical rarity not mentioned in this article is Mach’avariani (1913). This Mingrelian-born Kartvelian, raised in Samurzaq’an(o)/Abkhazia, had been arguing since the 1890s that Samurzaq’anoans were Abkhazians. In 1913 he calculated that Abkhazia's population was 140,000; of these he numbered the Abkhazians at 82,960 (including 33,639 Samurzaq’anoans who deemed themselves to be Abkhazians), making Abkhazians 60% of Abkhazia's population (pp.7, 116, 139, 150, 179) [Editor].) going by territorial divisions instead. On the other hand, they seem to have had little difficulty distinguishing Mingrelians and Samurzaq’anoans, who are regularly listed living side by side".

According to the 1897 census there were 58,697 people in Abkhazia who listed Abkhaz as their mother tongue, 23,810 people listed Mingrelian as their mother tongue, 1,971 people listed Georgian (including Imeretian dialect) as their mother tongue. The population of the Sukhumi district (Abkhazia) was about 100,000 at that time. Greeks, Russians and Armenians composed 3.5%, 2% and 1.5% of the district's population. By the end of the nineteenth century, Abkhazians made up slightly more than 53% of the population of Abkhazia. According to the 1917 agricultural census organized by the Russian Provisional Government, Georgians and Abkhaz composed 41.7% (54,760) and 30,4% (39,915) of the rural population of Abkhazia respectively.

During the Soviet Union, the Russian, Armenian, Greek and Georgian population grew faster than the Abkhaz, due to the large-scale migration enforced especially under the rule of Joseph Stalin and Lavrenty Beria, who himself was a Georgian born in Abkhazia.

In 2008 almost all of the circa 2000 Svans in the upper Kodori Valley fled Abkhazia when this tract of land was conquered by the Abkhazian army during the August war. The Abkhazian authorities have appealed for the Svan refugees to return, but by late March 2009 only 130 people continued to live in the upper Kodori Valley.

In 1993, during the military conflict, the Georgian/Mingrelian inhabitants of the Gali district left Abkhazia, however after some time nearly all came back.

The Abkhazian government has been trying to attract members of the Abkhaz diaspora (mainly in Turkey). In August 2013, the State Committee for Repatriation announced that since 1993, 7365 diaspora members had returned to Abkhazia, of which 4268 from Turkey, 494 from Syria, 107 from Egypt and Jordan and 2496 from Russia and other countries.

In September 2014, the Ministry of Internal Affairs of Abkhazia announced that 273 Ukrainians fleeing the War in Donbas had come to Abkhazia.

The following tables summarize the results of the censuses carried out in Abkhazia.

Year	Georgians (Note: including Mingrelians and Svans)		Abkhaz		Russians		Armenians		Greeks		Samurzakanians (Note: counted separately only in 1886)		Total
Year	%	#	%	#	%	#	%	#	%	#	%	#	Total
1886 Family Lists	6.1%	4,166	41.2%	28,323	1.6%	1,090	1.6%	1,090	3.1%	2,149	44.6%	30,640	68,773
1897 Census	24.4%	25,873	55.3%	58,697	4.8%	5,135	6.2%	6,552	5.1%	5,393	—N/a	—N/a	106,179
1926 Census	33.6%	67,494	27.3%	55,918	6.7%	12,553	12.8%	25,677	7.6%	14,045	—N/a	—N/a	201,016
1939 Census	29.5%	91,967	18.0%	56,197	19.3%	60,201	15.9%	49,705	11.1%	34,621	—N/a	—N/a	311,885
1959 Census	39.1%	158,221	15.1%	61,193	21.4%	86,715	15.9%	64,425	2.2%	9,101	—N/a	—N/a	404,738
1970 Census	41.0%	199,596	15.9%	77,276	19.1%	92,889	15.4%	74,850	2.7%	13,114	—N/a	—N/a	486,959
1979 Census	43.9%	213,322	17.1%	83,087	16.4%	79,730	15.1%	73,350	2.8%	13,642	—N/a	—N/a	486,082
1989 Census	45.7%	239,872	17.8%	93,267	14.3%	74,913	14.6%	76,541	2.8%	14,664	—N/a	—N/a	525,061
2003 Census	21.3%	45,953	43.8%	94,606	10.8%	23,420	20.8%	44,870	0.7%	1,486	—N/a	—N/a	215,972
2011 Census	17.93%	46,367	50.71%	122,069	9.17%	22,077	17.39%	41,864	0.6%	1,380	—N/a	—N/a	240,705
2021 Census	17.85%	43,604	51.36%	125,434	9.13%	22,303	16.99%	41,487	0.55%	1,348	—N/a		244,236

The number of Abkhaz might be inflated in the 2011 census. The growth of Abkhaz also probably reflects decisions by those of mixed ancestry to declare themselves as Abkhaz.

== Ethnic minorities ==
The ethnic Georgians who mostly live in Gali district are often subject to ethnic discrimination, denial of political and civil rights and police misconduct.

== See also ==
- Demographics of Georgia
- Armenians in Abkhazia
- History of the Jews in Abkhazia
- Afro-Abkhazians
