= Valerian Kobakhia =

Abkhazian politician (1929–1992)

Valerian Osmanovich Kobakhia (Russian: Валериан Османович Кобахия; 15 May 1929 – 28 August 1992) was an Abkhaz and Soviet statesman and party leader from Lykhny, Abkhazia. As the head of parliament, he signed the Declaration on the sovereignty of Abkhazia.

Valerian Kobakhia
