= Socialist Soviet Republic of Abkhazia =

Soviet country (1921–1931)

Socialist Soviet Republic of Abkhazia Социалисттә Советтә Республика Аҧсны (Abkhaz) აფხაზეთის სოციალისტური საბჭოთა რესპუბლიკა (Georgian) Социалистическая Советская Республика Абхазия (Russian)
- 1921–1931
- Flag State emblem
- Motto: Пролетарии всех стран, соединяйтесь! Proletarii vsekh stran, soyedinyaytes'! "Proletarians of all countries, unite!"
- Anthem: Интернационал; Internatsional "The Internationale"
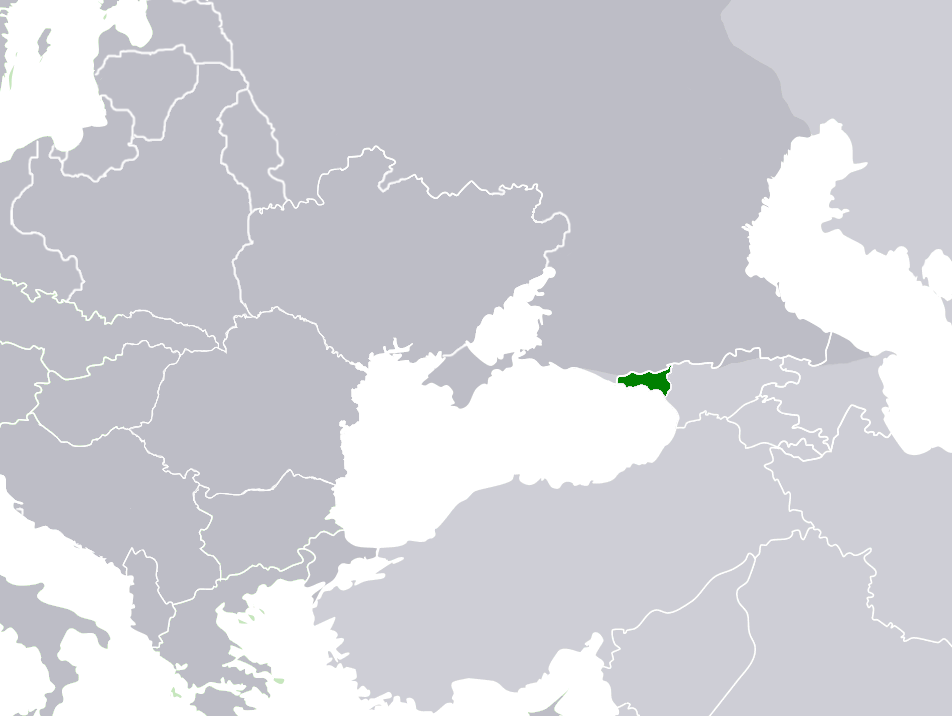
- The Socialist Soviet Republic of Abkhazia in 1921
- Capital: Sukhum
- Official languages: Abkhaz, Georgian, Russian
- Common languages: Abkhaz; Georgian; Russian; Armenian; Turkish
- Government: Soviet republic
- Legislature: Congress of Soviets
- History
  - Established: 31 March 1921
  - Disestablished: 19 February 1931

Population
  - 1926: 201,016
- Currency: Ruble
Preceded by	Succeeded by
Democratic Republic of Georgia	Abkhaz ASSR

The Socialist Soviet Republic of Abkhazia (SSR Abkhazia) (Note: Abkhaz: Социалисттә Советтә Республика Аҧсны, ССР Аҧсны; Sociālicṭṭw Soveṭṭw Resṗubliḳā Āpsnə Georgian: საბჭოთა სოციალისტური რესპუბლიკა აფხაზეთი, სსრ აფხაზეთი; Sabch'ota Sotsialist'uri Resp'ublika Apkhazeti Russian: Социалистическая Советская Республика Абхазия, ССР Абхазия; Sotsialisticheskaya Sovetskaya Respublika Abkhaziya) was a short-lived Soviet republic within the Caucasus region of the Soviet Union that covered the territory of Abkhazia, (Note: Abkhazia is the subject of a territorial dispute between the Republic of Abkhazia and Georgia. The Republic of Abkhazia unilaterally declared independence on 23 July 1992, but Georgia continues to claim it as part of its own sovereign territory. Abkhazia has received formal recognition as an independent state from 7 out of 193 United Nations member states, 3 of which have subsequently withdrawn its recognition.) and existed from 31 March 1921 to 19 February 1931. The region was previously part of the Georgian Democratic Republic as an autonomy and was formed in the aftermath of the Red Army invasion of the country in 1921. It was declared on 31 March 1921 and on 16 December 1921 agreed to a treaty that united it with the Georgian Soviet Socialist Republic (Georgian SSR). The SSR Abkhazia was similar to an autonomous Soviet republic, though it retained nominal independence from Georgia and was given certain features only full union republics had, like its own military units. Through its status as a "treaty republic" with Georgia, Abkhazia joined the Transcaucasian Soviet Federative Socialist Republic, which united Armenian, Azerbaijani, and Georgian SSRs into one federal unit when the latter was formed in 1922. The SSR Abkhazia was abolished in 1931 and replaced with the Abkhaz Autonomous Soviet Socialist Republic within the Georgian SSR.

During its existence, the SSR Abkhazia was led by Nestor Lakoba, who served officially as the Chairman of the Council of People's Commissars but controlled the republic to such an extent that it was jokingly referred to as "Lakobistan". Due to Lakoba's close relationship with Soviet leader Joseph Stalin, collectivisation was delayed until after Abkhazia was incorporated into Georgian SSR. Abkhazia remained a major tobacco producer in this era, growing over half of the USSR's supply. It also produced other agricultural produce, including tea, wine, and citrus fruits, leading to Abkhazia being one of the wealthiest regions in the Soviet Union. Its sub-tropical climate also made it a prime holiday destination, with Stalin and other Soviet leaders owning dachas (holiday homes) in the region and spending considerable time there.

An ethnically diverse region, Abkhazia was nominally led by the Abkhaz people. Other major groups included Georgians, Armenians, Greeks, and Russians. Even though they did not form the majority, the Abkhaz were heavily favoured and the Abkhaz language was promoted as a result of the korenizatsiia policies of the era. The quasi-independent republic was downgraded in 1931. With the advent of glasnost and perestroika in the late 1980s, Abkhaz leaders called for their state to be re-formed and secede from Georgia, citing the SSR Abkhazia as a precedent. This led to them restoring the 1925 SSR Abkhazian constitution, which led to the 1992–1993 war between Abkhazian secessionists and Georgia, and the modern Abkhazia conflict.

== History ==
=== Background ===
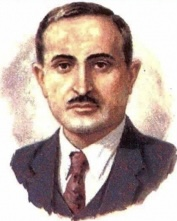
Efrem Eshba

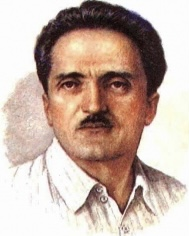
Nestor Lakoba

The Russian Empire annexed Abkhazia in the early nineteenth century and had consolidated its authority over the region by 1864. Reluctant to create ethno-territorial units, the Russian authorities incorporated the region into the Kutais Governorate. Large-scale population transfers saw the ethnic composition of Abkhazia radically altered, with thousands of ethnic Abkhaz expelled and ethnic Mingrelians brought in to replace them. After the 1917 February Revolution, which ended the Russian Empire, the status of Abkhazia became contested and was unclear. Free from Russian rule, it considered joining the Mountainous Republic of the Northern Caucasus in 1917, but ultimately decided against this due to the distance between Abkhazia and the rest of the groups involved, but in Abkhazia, clashes continued with the nationalists, who were supported by the Mountainous Republic and the Socialist Party of Abkhazia, who were supported by the Russian Soviet Federative Socialist Republic. In response, the Mountainous Republic declared Abkhazia as part of its territory. In February 1918, Abkhaz Bolsheviks attempted to create a commune—a similar system to the soviets (councils) being formed in Russia. This effort was unsuccessful and the Bolshevik leaders, Efrem Eshba and Nestor Lakoba, fled. The Abkhaz People's Council (APC) was formed in the aftermath and effectively controlled the region. When the Democratic Republic of Georgia was formed in May 1918, it annexed Abkhazia, considering it an integral part of its territory. Georgia never fully established control of the region, leaving the APC to rule it until the Bolshevik invasion of 1921.

The status of Abkhazia was confirmed in the Georgian constitution of 1921. Article 107 guaranteed "Abkhazeti (Note: The Georgian language version of Abkhazia is used in English translations of the 1921 Constitution.) (district of Soukhoum)" autonomy for "the administration of their affairs". The constitution was proclaimed after the Red Army invasion of Georgia in February 1921; the nature of the promised autonomy was never determined. According to the historian Timothy Blauvelt, this had a lasting legacy in the region because it marked the first time in modern history Abkhazia was defined as a distinct geographic entity.

=== Formation ===
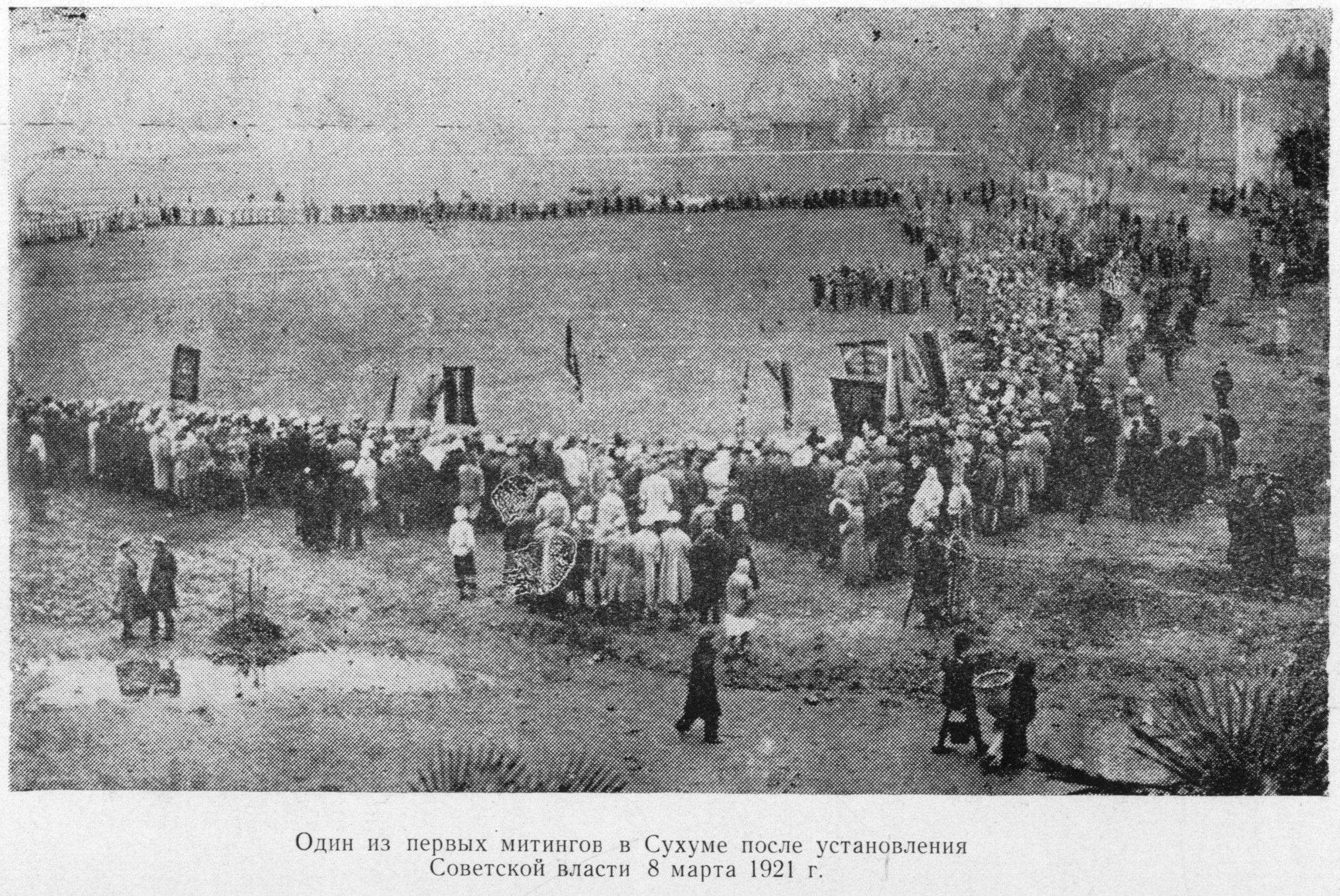
One of the first rallies in Sukhumi after the establishment of Soviet power on 8 March 1921

On 15 February 1921, the Red Army invaded Georgia. Abkhazia was invaded two days later. Eshba and Lakoba returned to Abkhazia before the invasion and formed a Revolutionary Committee (Revkom) in preparation for a Bolshevik government. Sukhumi, the capital, was captured on 4 March. With fighting in Georgia continuing, the Revkom, who did not expect to be the sole authority over Abkhazia, took advantage of the confusion and moved to declare Abkhazia an independent republic. They sent a telegram to Moscow asking for advice on how to proceed, and suggested joining the Russian Soviet Federative Socialist Republic, but Sergo Ordzhonikidze—a leading Bolshevik and the leader of the Caucasus Bureau (Kavbiuro)—dismissed the idea. As a result, on 31 March 1921, it declared that "at the will of workers a new Socialist Soviet Republic of Abkhazia is born." This made Abkhazia a nominally independent republic with the understanding on both the Abkhaz and Georgian sides that eventually Abkhazia would join the newly formed Georgian Soviet Socialist Republic (Georgian SSR). Until then it was regarded as being completely detached from Georgia and was treated as such. The Georgian Revkom, the governing body of the Georgian SSR, welcomed Abkhazia in a telegram on 21 May 1921, and said the form of relations should be settled during the first Workers' Congresses of both republics.

=== Status ===
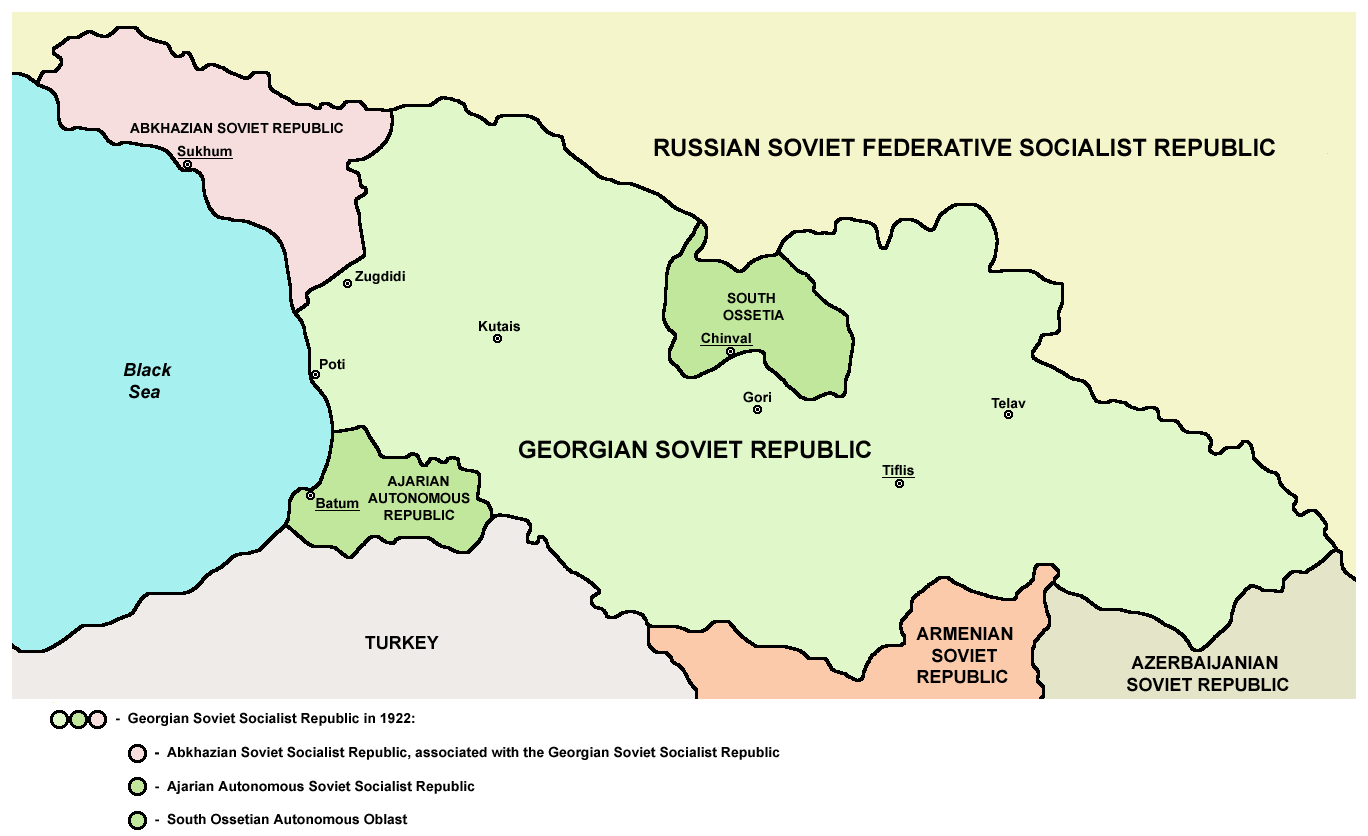
The Georgian SSR as it appeared in 1922. The SSR Abkhazia is highlighted in pink.

The Abkhaz Revkom, in a position of power, was reluctant to schedule a congress to determine the future status of Abkhazia because it would mean relinquishing control over the region. The Kavbiuro forced the Revkom to act and negotiations for a treaty between Abkhazia and Georgia began in October 1921. The result, signed on 16 December 1921, was a two-article treaty:

1. SSR Georgia and SSR Abkhazia enter into political, military and financial-economic union.
2. In order to fulfill the aforementioned goal both governments declare the merging of the following Commissariats: a) military, b) finance, c) peoples' agriculture, d) post and telegraph, e) ChKa, f) RKI, g) People's Commissariat of Justice, and h) [Commissariat of] Sea Transport.

— Union Treaty between SSR Georgia and SSR Abkhazia

The treaty united the two states, leaving Abkhazia as a "treaty republic" nominally subservient to Georgia. The special status of Abkhazia within Georgia was reinforced in the 1922 Georgian constitution, which mentioned the "special union treaty" between the two. The 1925 Abkhazian constitution noted it was united with Georgia "on the base of a special treaty". On 13 December 1922, while united with Georgia, Abkhazia joined the Transcaucasian Socialist Federative Soviet Republic (TSFSR), along with Armenia and Azerbaijan. This new federation was created ostensibly for economic purposes, but was more likely done to consolidate Soviet control over the region, which had been contentious. Abkhazia was mostly treated as an autonomous region of Georgia, though unlike other autonomous states in the Soviet Union, it had its own national symbols—a flag and coat of arms—and national army units, a right only given to full republics. The coat of arms was initially described in the 1925 constitution as being "composed of a golden hammer and sickle on the background of the Abkhazian landscape with inscription in the Abkhaz language 'SSR Abkhazia'". This was slightly modified in 1926, when the republican (and Soviet-wide) motto "Proletarians of all countries, unite!" was written in Abkhaz, Georgian, and Russian (previously it had only been written in Abkhaz). It also had its own constitution, created on 1 April 1925, another right only granted to full republics.

The union with Georgia was not popular among the Abkhaz populace or leadership. It was also received poorly in Georgia, where it was regarded as a ploy by the Bolsheviks to divert Georgian hostility from the authorities in Moscow towards the Abkhaz, as the Georgians were one of the most hostile groups towards the Bolsheviks. As the only "treaty republic" in the USSR, the exact status of the SSR Abkhazia concerned the Soviet and Georgian authorities, which did not want other regions to demand a similar status. To resolve this it was decided to downgrade Abkhazia, and on 19 February 1931, it was re-formed as the Abkhaz Autonomous Soviet Socialist Republic, subservient to the Georgian SSR while remaining a member of the TSFSR. The move was met with public protests, the first large-scale protests in Abkhazia against the Soviet authorities.

== Politics ==
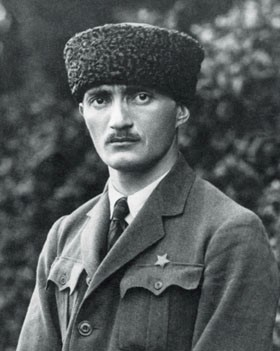
Nestor Lakoba, who served as the de facto leader of Abkhazia from 1921 until his death in 1936. He was instrumental in having the SSR Abkhazia established.

Initially, the Abkhaz Revkom, led by its chairman Efrem Eshba, controlled Abkhazia until a more permanent body could be established. On 17 February 1922 the Council of People's Commissars was established, and Nestor Lakoba was elected its Chairman, becoming the head of government of the republic; this was a formality for Lakoba, who had effectively been in control of Abkhazia since the Bolsheviks took control in 1921. Alongside Eshba, he had been a leading Bolshevik in the aftermath of the Russian Revolution. Lakoba and Eshba led two abortive attempts to seize Abkhazia in February and April 1918. After the latter attempt failed, they both fled, only returning in March 1921 after Bolshevik control had been consolidated; Eshba was soon transferred to other positions, leaving Lakoba alone as the head of Abkhazia.

Lakoba effectively controlled Abkhazia and his status as a leader of the republic was never contested or challenged. He resisted many of the repressive policies that were being implemented elsewhere in the Soviet Union, including collectivization. Lakoba also financially supported the Abkhaz nobility, which he was able to do because of his close personal relationship with Soviet leader Joseph Stalin.

== Economy ==
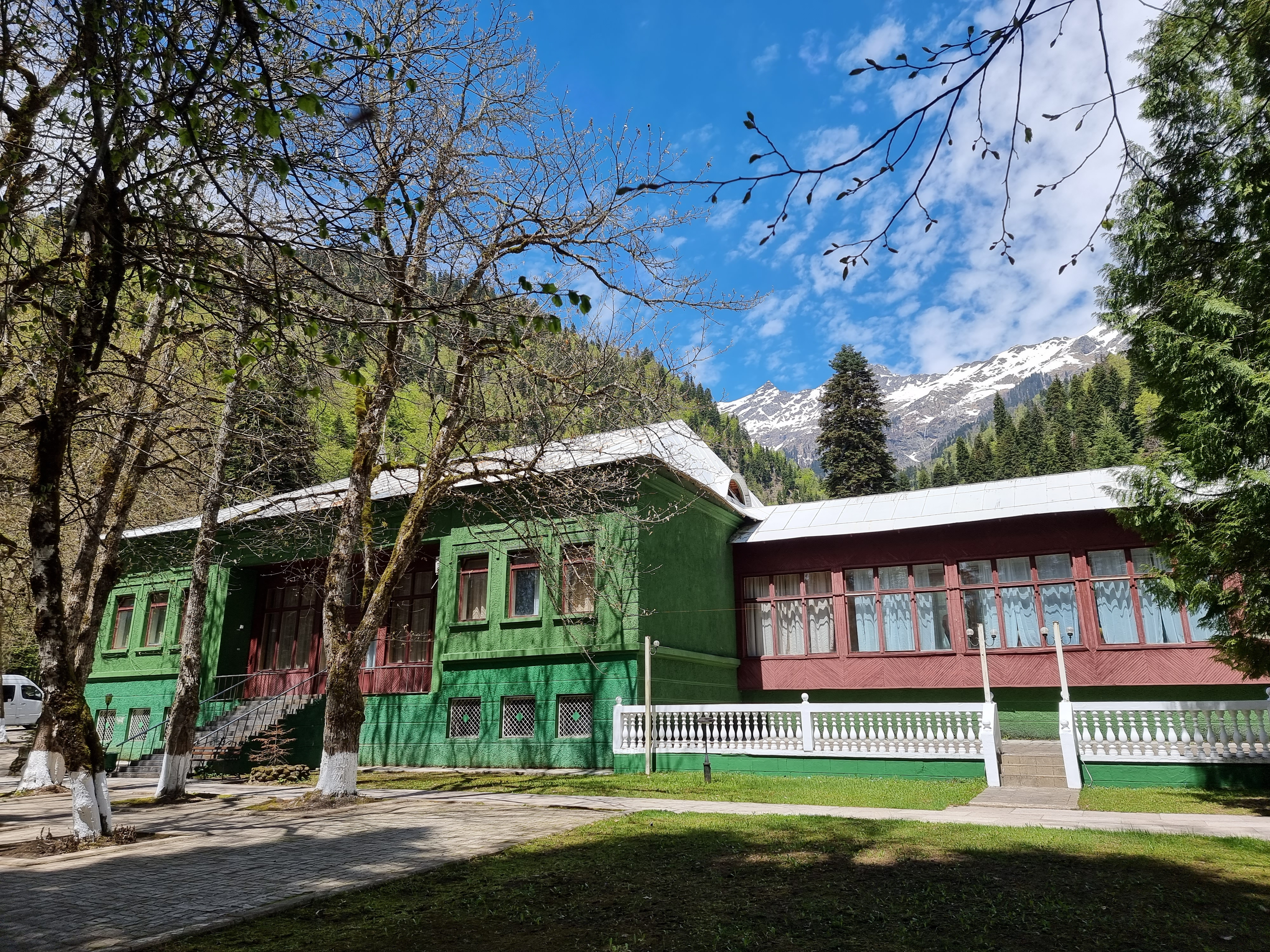
Joseph Stalin's Dacha at Lake Ritsa, one of Stalin's dachas in Abkhazia

Abkhazia was a major producer of tobacco during the Soviet era. In the 1930s, it was responsible for up to 52 per cent of the Soviet Union's tobacco exports. Other agricultural products, including tea, wine, and citrus fruits—especially tangerines—were produced in large quantities, making Abkhazia one of the most well-off regions in the entire Soviet Union, and considerably richer than Georgia. The export of these resources turned the region into "an island of prosperity in a war-ravaged Caucasus". Several factories were also built in the region as part of the overall development of the Soviet Union, though they had less impact on the overall economic strength of Abkhazia.

Abkhazia was also prized as a major holiday destination for both the Soviet elite and the general population. Stalin visited annually throughout the 1920s and was joined by his associates from the Kremlin, who used this time to gain his trust. As host, Lakoba grew increasingly close to Stalin and became a confidant of his, allowing him to keep his dominant position over Abkhazia. This was most apparent when Lakoba refused to implement collectivisation, arguing that there were no kulaks (affluent peasants) in the state. Such a policy was defended by Stalin, who said the anti-kulak policy did not "take account of the specific peculiarities of Abkhaz social structure and made the mistake of mechanically transferring Russian models of social engineering to Abkhaz soil". Collectivisation was first carried out after Abkhazia was downgraded in 1931, and fully implemented in 1936 after Lakoba's death.

Throughout the SSR's existence, the Soviet ruble was its official currency.

== Demographics ==
Ethnicity in Abkhazia per 1926 Soviet census
1. Georgians (33.6%)
2. Abkhazs (27.8%)
3. Armenians (12.8%)
4. Caucasus Greeks (6.99%)
5. Russians (6.25%)
6. Other (12.6%)

The SSR Abkhazia was an ethnically diverse region, whose demographics changed considerably in the decades after its annexation by Russia. Up to 100,000 Abkhaz had been deported in the late nineteenth century, mainly to the Ottoman Empire. By the time the SSR Abkhazia was formed, ethnic Abkhaz comprised less than 30 per cent of the population. The korenizatsiia (nativization) policy implemented in this era, which was to promote minority groups within the USSR, saw the numbers of Abkhaz increase: between 1922 and 1926, ethnic Abkhaz grew by roughly 8%, while the number of ethnic Georgians dropped by 6%. Thus, according to the 1926 Soviet census, the only census conducted during the SSR's existence, the number of ethnic Abkhaz reached 55,918 or around 28% of the total population (which numbered 201,016), while the number of Georgians was around 67,494 (36%). Other major ethnic groups counted in the 1926 census were Armenians (25,677, or 13%), Greeks (14,045, or 7%), and Russians (12,553, or 6%).

The script used for the Abkhaz language was modified during the era of the SSR Abkhazia. Under korenizatsiia the Abkhaz were not considered one of the "advanced" peoples in the USSR, and thus saw an increased focus on their national language and cultural development. As part of these policies, Abkhaz—along with many other regional languages in the USSR—was Latinized in 1928, moving it away from the original Cyrillic-based script. Emphasis was placed on developing Abkhaz culture, which was heavily promoted and financed. To further this, an Abkhazian Scientific Society was created in 1922, while an Academy of Abkhazian Language and Literature was founded in 1925.

In recognition of the multiple ethnic groups within Abkhazia, Article 8 of the 1925 Abkhaz constitution called for three official languages—Abkhaz, Georgian, and Russian—while a later amendment stated, "all nationalities populating the SSR Abkhazia are guaranteed the right of free development and use of the native language both in national-cultural and in general state agencies". Most of the population did not understand Abkhaz so Russian was the dominant language of government while local regions used the language that was most prevalent there.

== Legacy ==
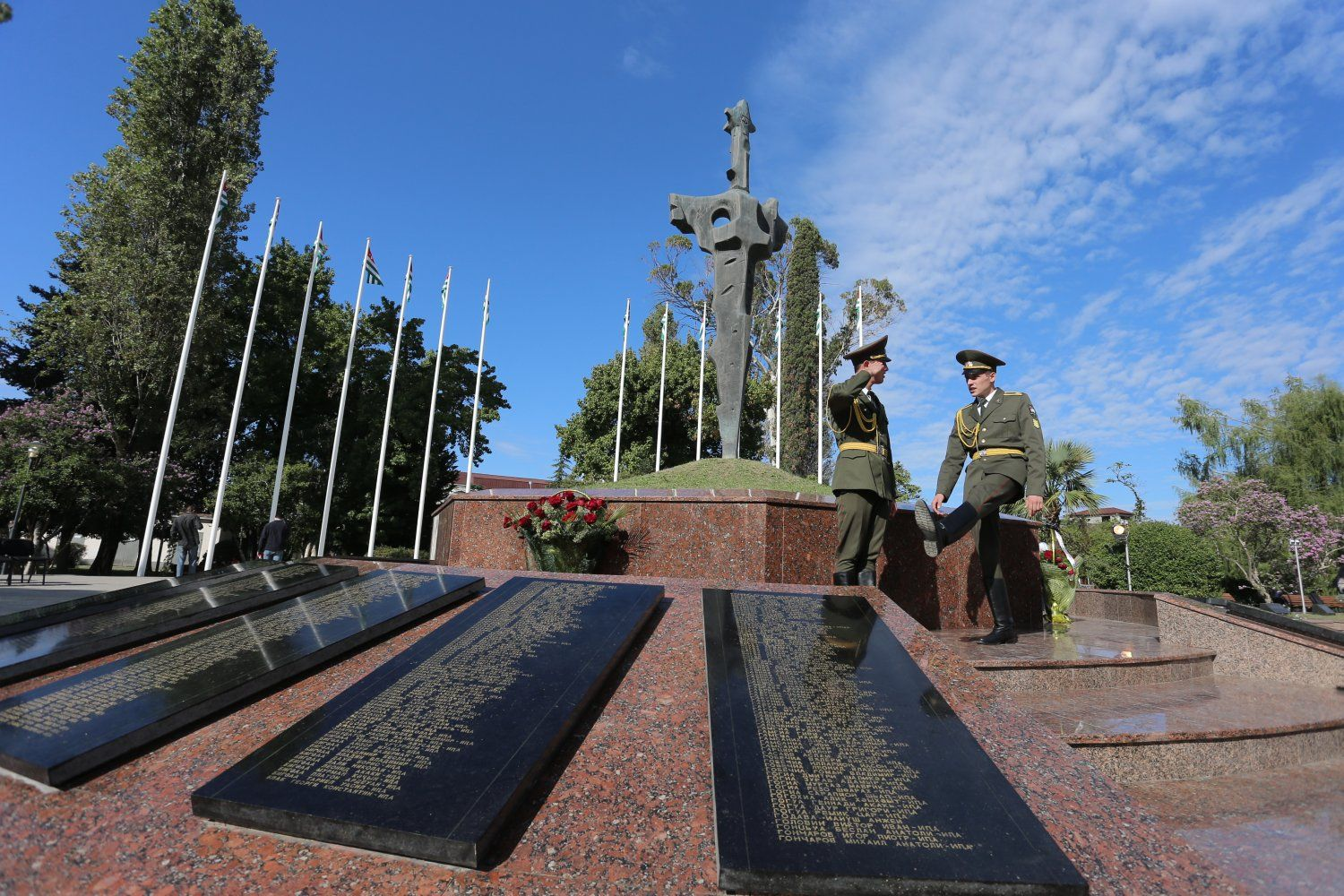
Park of Glory in Sukhumi, commemorating the fallen Abzhaz soldiers in the 1992–1993 war

The exact status of Abkhazia as a "treaty republic" was never clarified during its existence, and historian Arsène Saparov has suggested even officials at the time did not know what the phrase meant. The status had symbolic meaning to the Abkhaz people, who never forgot they had, at least in theory, an independent state. With the advent of glasnost and perestroika in the 1980s, calls for Abkhazia to restore its status began. An assembly at Lykhny in 1989 called for the Soviet authorities to make Abkhazia a full union republic, claiming the SSR Abkhazia as a precedent for this move. When Abkhazia declared independence in 1990, it requested the restoration of the 1925 constitution, which called for Abkhazia and Georgia to unite, allowing for the possibility of a future union between the two states. The restoration of the 1925 constitution was a pretext for the 1992–1993 war and the ensuing dispute over the status of Abkhazia, which has led to Abkhazia being de facto independent of Georgia since 1992.
