= Christoph Zürcher =

Professor of political science

Christoph Zürcher (also spelled Zuercher, born 3 June 1967) is a professor at the graduate school of public and international affairs at the University of Ottawa, where he has been since 2008. He was previously a professor of political science at the Free University in Berlin. He was also a Humboldt fellow at the Center on Democracy, Development and the Role of Law at Stanford University.

== Books ==
Zürcher is the author of:

- The Post-Soviet Wars: Rebellion, Ethnic Conflict, and Nationhood in the Caucasus (NYU Press, 2007)

His edited volumes include:

- Potentials of Disorder: New Approaches to Conflict Analysis (with Jan Koehler, Manchester University Press, 2003)
- Interventionskultur: Zur Soziologie von Interventionsgesellshaften (with Thorsten Bonacker, Michael Daxner, and Jan H. Free, VS Verlag für Sozialwissenschaften, 2010)
- Costly Democracy: Peacebuilding and Democratization After War (with Carrie Manning, Kristie D. Evenson, Rachel Hayman, Sarah Riese, and Nora Roehner, Stanford University Press, 2013)
