= 1991 Abkhazian Supreme Soviet election =

- 29 September 1991; 14 October 1991; 1 December 1991
- All 65 seats in the Supreme Soviet; 33 seats needed for a majority

Supreme Soviet elections were held in Abkhazia, Georgia, on 29 September 1991, with a second round on 14 October. A third round was held in twelve constituencies where voter turnout had been below the 50% threshold on 1 December.

== Background ==
The victory of the opposition bloc Round Table—Free Georgia in the October 1990 elections to the Georgian Soviet Socialist Republic's Supreme Council brought significant political changes that also affected Georgia's autonomous units. On 23 June 1991, elections were held in the Autonomous Republic of Adjara. Meanwhile, South Ossetia, another autonomous region, had already moved toward separation from Georgia in September 1990. In response, the newly elected Supreme Council of Georgia adopted a decree abolishing South Ossetia's autonomous status. The ensuing political crisis eventually developed into an armed conflict.

The Abkhaz Autonomous Soviet Socialist Republic was another autonomous unit within Georgia. By the summer of 1991, the situation in Abkhazia remained relatively calm, although the legacy of the Abkhaz nationalist movement of the late 1980s remained strong, particularly that of the 1989 Lykhny Appeal, which had called for Abkhazia's separation from Georgia. Amid the ongoing conflict in South Ossetia, the Georgian central government pursued a moderate and conciliatory policy toward Abkhazia. Georgian and Abkhaz political representatives actively negotiated new legislation governing the autonomous republic and the organization of its elections.

== Electoral system ==
On 5 July 1991, the Abkhazia's Voice newspaper published a draft law on the election of deputies to the Supreme Soviet of the Autonomous Soviet Socialist Republic of Abkhazia. The draft provided for the election of 65 deputies in single-member electoral districts drawn according to the ethnic composition of the population. The Supreme Soviet of Abkhazia subsequently approved the electoral law, which retained the provision for creating single-member districts on the basis of nationality. Following negotiations between the central government in Tbilisi and Vladislav Ardzinba, then chairman of the Supreme Soviet of Abkhazia, it was agreed that the central government would propose the allocation of electoral districts by nationality in a manner that would favor Abkhaz representation. As a result, the distribution of electoral districts did not correspond to the region's actual demographic composition. The ethnic basis of the electoral districts presented a further problem, since, apart from a few regions such as Gali and Gudauta, most of Abkhazia's population lived in ethnically mixed areas. Under the law, only candidates belonging to the ethnicity assigned to a particular district could stand for election. Thus, for example, in districts designated as Abkhaz, only individuals whose Soviet passports identified them as "Abkhazian" were eligible to be nominated.

The 65 seats in the Supreme Soviet were distributed among the region's ethnic groups as follows: 28 seats were allocated to Abkhazians, 26 to Georgians, and 11 to members of other ethnic groups. A two-thirds majority was to be required to pass "important legislation", ensuring that key decisions could not be adopted without the support of both Abkhaz and Georgian deputies and, in principle, giving each side veto power.

The distribution of seats caused discontent among a significant number of Abkhazia's residents, as it did not accurately reflect the region's demographic composition. According to the 1989 Soviet census, Georgians accounted for 46% of Abkhazia's population, Abkhazians 18%, Armenians 15%, and Russians 14%. Despite this, Abkhazians were allocated 43% of the seats, while Georgians, the largest ethnic group, received 40%. The remaining ethnic groups, which together accounted for 36% of the population, were allocated only 17% of the seats. The electoral districts also varied considerably in size. For example, districts in the Gali region, which were reserved for Georgian candidates, contained an average of 4,000–6,500 voters, whereas Abkhaz-designated districts in Gudauta, Gagra, and Ochamchire had fewer than 2,000 voters.

== Campaign ==
In the Abkhaz single-member districts, candidates included independents, current and former Communist Party officials, and members of Aidgilara. In the Georgian districts, candidates from the ruling Round Table coalition predominated, while the Georgian Green Party, Rustaveli Society, Ilia Chavchavadze Society, and other political organizations also fielded candidates. In the Abkhaz districts, typically only one or two candidates were registered, whereas most Georgian districts had three or more. Georgian political parties were often divided and competed against one another, although some attempted unsuccessfully to reach an agreement on a single list of candidates.

== Results ==
According to the local press, voters in many electoral districts were confused and disillusioned by the electoral system. In numerous ethnically mixed areas, candidates representing one particular ethnic group were allowed to contest elections, while members of other ethnic groups were excluded from the race. Voter turnout was low in the first round: fewer than half of eligible voters cast their ballots in 12 of the 65 districts, necessitating repeat elections. A total of 38 deputies were elected in the first round, including 26 Abkhazians, eight Georgians, and four representatives of other ethnic groups. In 14 districts—12 Georgian and two designated for other ethnic groups—the winner could not be determined in the first round. Appeals were filed against the election results in some districts, and the local Central Election Commission revoked the district results. Ultimately, repeat elections were to be held in 13 districts. The second round was held on 14 October, while repeat elections were conducted on 1 December 1991; in some districts, the second round took place in November. In several districts, however, the elections were again inconclusive because of low voter turnout. Although new elections were scheduled for January–February 1992, the Supreme Soviet ultimately remained incompletely constituted.

== Aftermath ==
The newly elected Supreme Soviet was only able to approve legislation in some areas of policy with a 75% majority. In May 1992 the Abkhaz faction of the Soviet approved the appointment of Alexander Ankvab, an Abkhaz member of the Supreme Soviet, as the Internal Affairs Minister, replacing the ethnic Georgian Givi Lominadze. The appointment was opposed by the Georgian members of the Soviet. The tensions increased on 24 June 1992, when the chairman of the Abkhazian Supreme Soviet, Vladislav Ardzinba, ordered the republican guard to storm the building of the Abkhazian Ministry of Internal Affairs and remove Lominadze from office resulting in Lominadze's hospitalization. On 30 June, the Georgian deputies of the Supreme Soviet walked out and began boycotting its sessions.

== Sources ==
- Iremadze, Irakli (2020). Electoral History of Georgia: 1990-2018 (PDF). Central Election Commission of Georgia.
- Potier, Tim (2001). Conflict in Nagorno-Karabakh, Abkhazia and South Ossetia: A Legal Appraisal. The Hague / London / Boston: Kluwer Law International. ISBN 9789041114778.
- Wheatley, Jonathan (2005). Georgia from National Awakening to Rose Revolution. Ashgate Publishing. ISBN 9780754645030.
