= Stephen F. Jones =

American historian

Stephen F. Jones (born c. 1953) is an English expert on post-Communist societies in the former Soviet Union and Eastern Europe who currently serves as Chair of Russian and Eurasian Studies at Mount Holyoke College, South Hadley, Massachusetts.

Jones received his B.A. in 1974 from the University of Essex, his PhD from the London School of Economics in 1984. He has taught at the University of California, Santa Cruz (1986), the University of London (1986–88), and at the University of Oxford (1988–89).

Jones specialises in the history and politics of the South Caucasus nations (Georgia, Armenia, Azerbaijan). He speaks fluent Georgian and reads Russian and French fluently. He has lectured at various schools in the United States and regularly briefs the US State Department in the Caucasus.

== Selected publications ==
- Socialism in Georgian Colors: The European Road to Social Democracy, 1883–1917 (Harvard University Press 2005)
- War and Revolution in the Caucasus: Georgia Ablaze (Routledge 2010)
- Georgia: A Political History Since Independence (I.B. Tauris 2012)
- The Making of Modern Georgia, 1918–2012: The First Georgian Republic and its Successors (Routledge 2014)
