= Tourism in Abkhazia =

Tourism in Abkhazia has been an important part of its economy. Visiting Abkhazia for non-Georgian citizens is technically illegal under the Georgian law, by which the Georgian government prohibits most foreigners from entering the disputed territory except from the Georgian side, which in turn is not usually allowed by the Abkhaz authorities. Abkhazia continues to be accessible for tourists coming from the Russian side of the Abkhazia–Russia border which is not under Georgian control. Low prices and an absence of any visa requirements attracts Russian tourists, especially those who can not afford the vacations in Turkey, Egypt, Bulgaria and other popular Russian touristic directions.

== Background ==
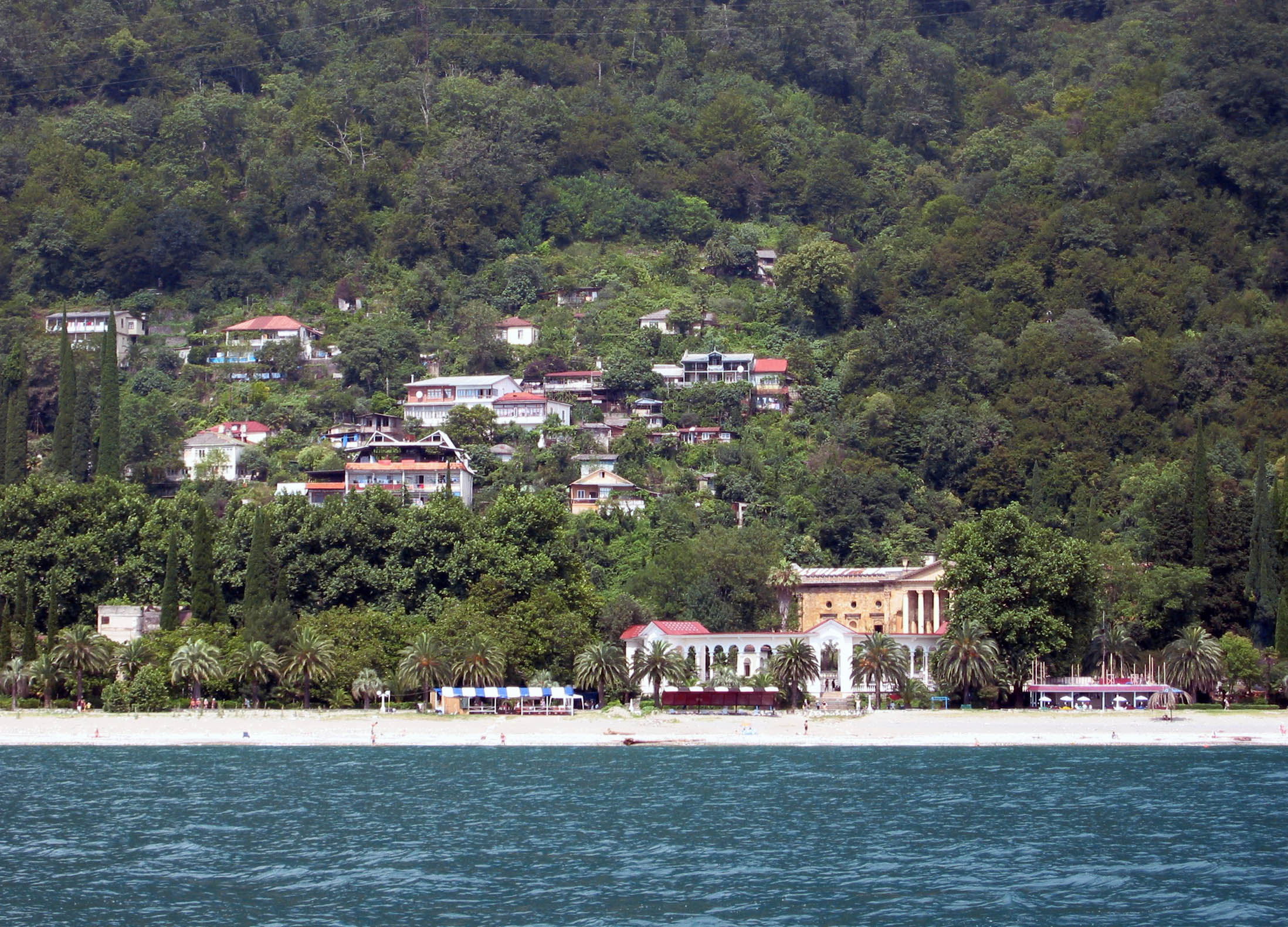
Gagra

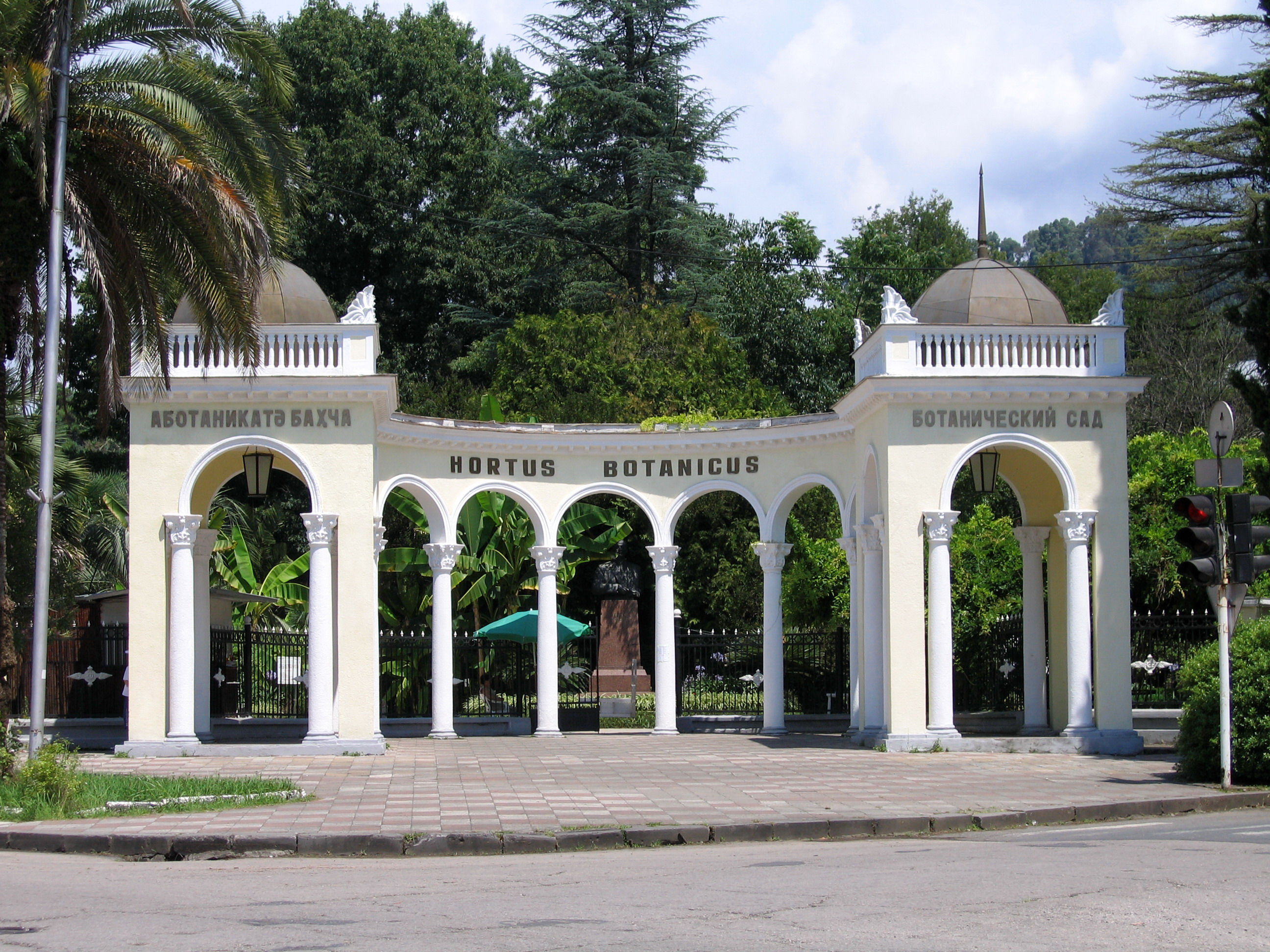
Sukhumi botanical garden

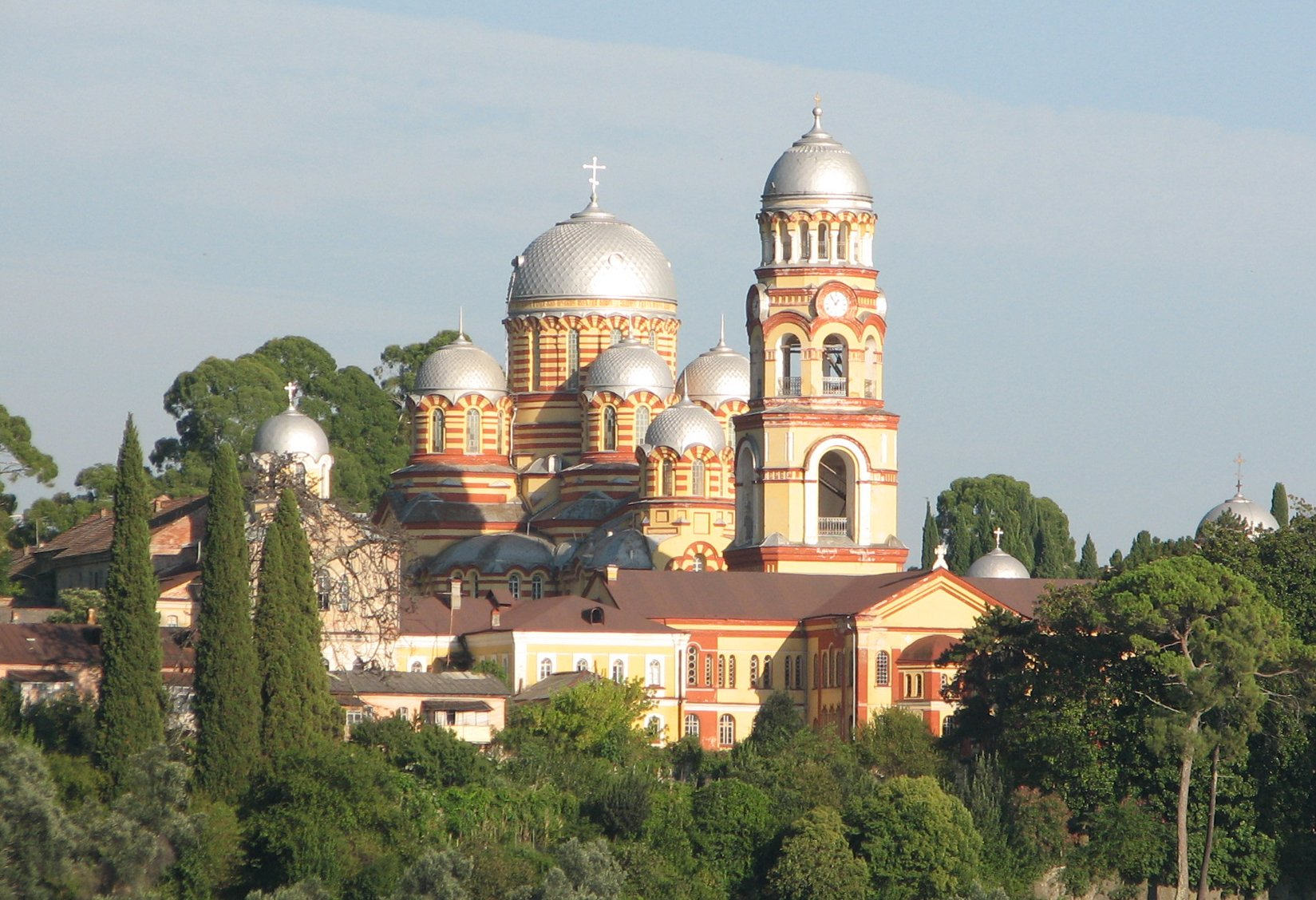
New Athos Monastery

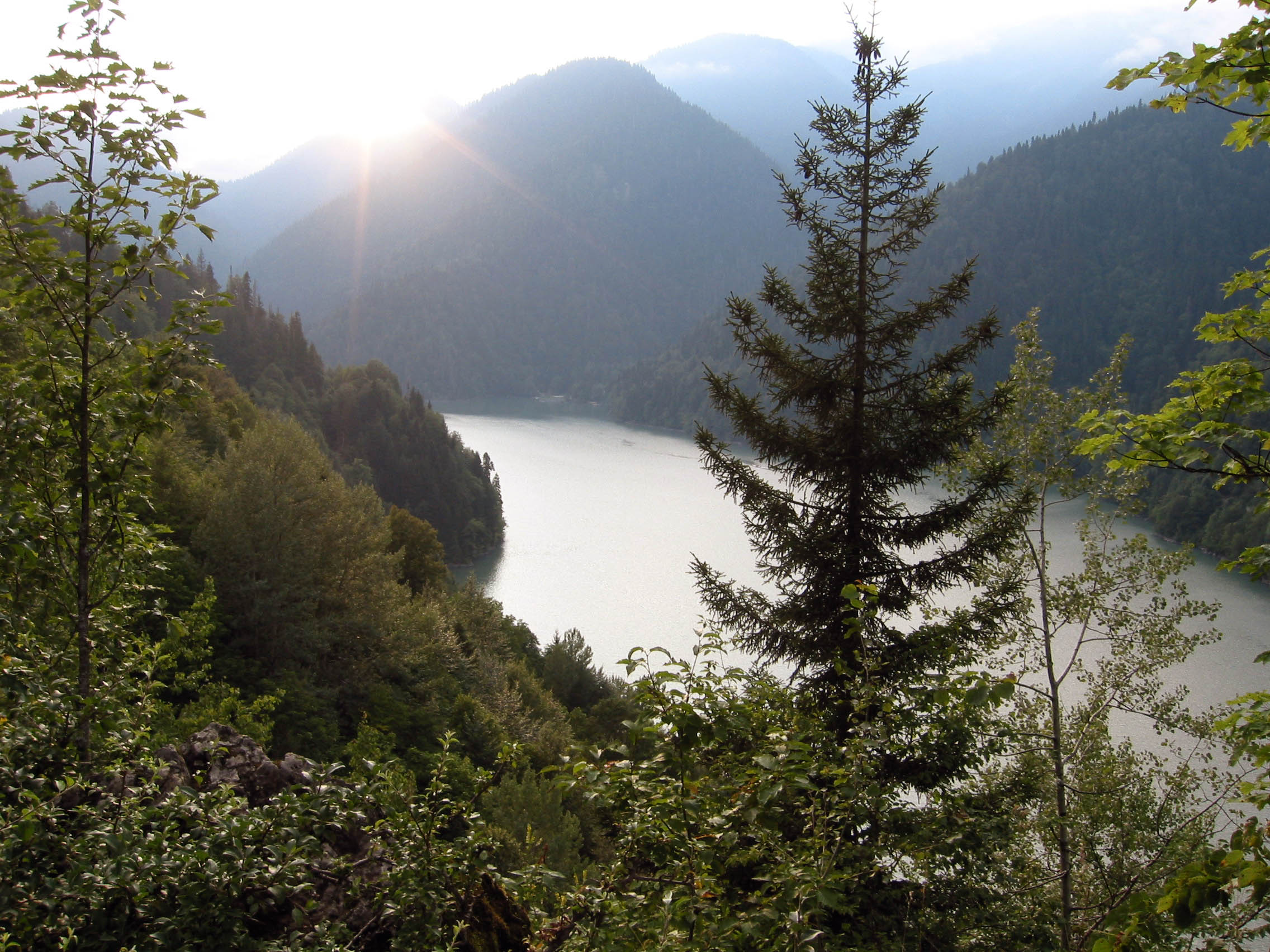
Ritsa lake

During the time of the Soviet Union, Abkhazia's Black Sea beaches attracted tourists from a number of surrounding countries, constituting a 40 percent share of the Georgian Soviet Socialist Republic's tourism market. Prior to the 1992-93 war in Abkhazia, over 202,000 tourists visited the region every year. Abkhazia is now a disputed region, with Russia, Nicaragua and Venezuela as the only United Nations member states that recognize the territory as an independent nation.

Despite the risks involved, about one million tourists visit Abkhazia each year, mainly from Russia. One of the attractions of visiting Abkhazia as opposed to other Black Sea coastal towns, such as Sochi, is the lower cost of visiting the breakaway state. One night's accommodation in Gagra, for example, cost US$25 in 2003, with the cheapest hotel in the region setting a rate of US$12 for a room and meals in that year. A trainride from a Russian border town of Sochi to the Abkhazian capital of Sukhumi only cost US$1 in 2003. However, Abkhazia's tourism facilities are below Western standards, with much of its infrastructure dating back to the Soviet era.

== Tourism attractions ==
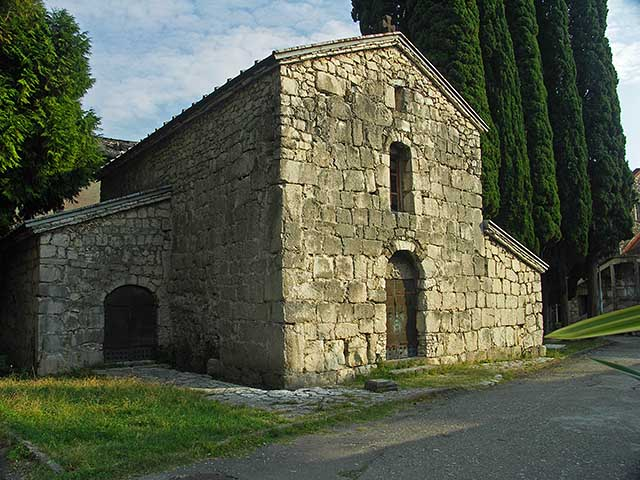
Church of Gagra

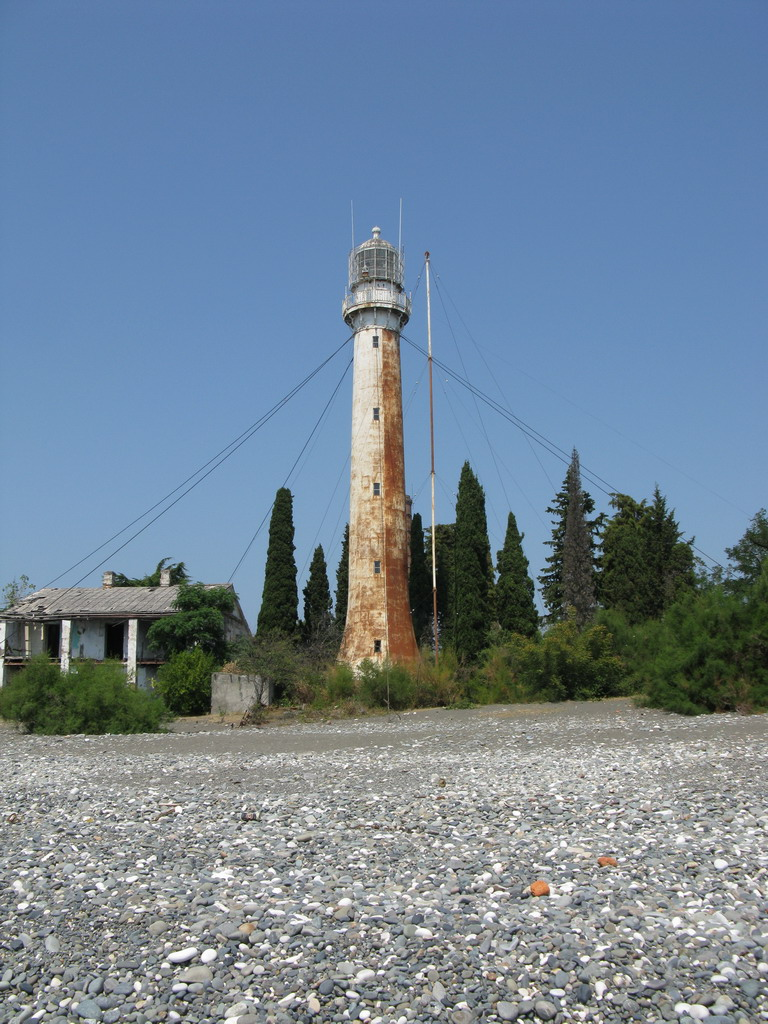
Sukhumi Lighthouse

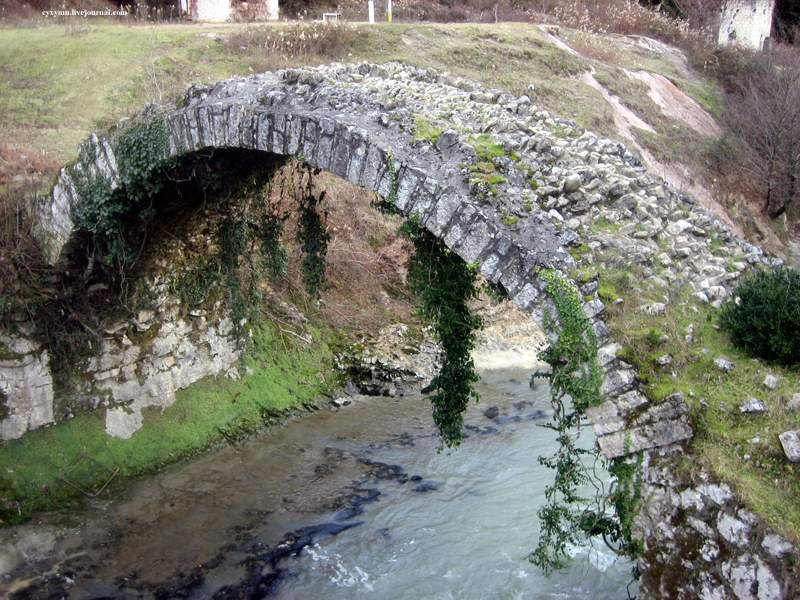
Besleti Bridge

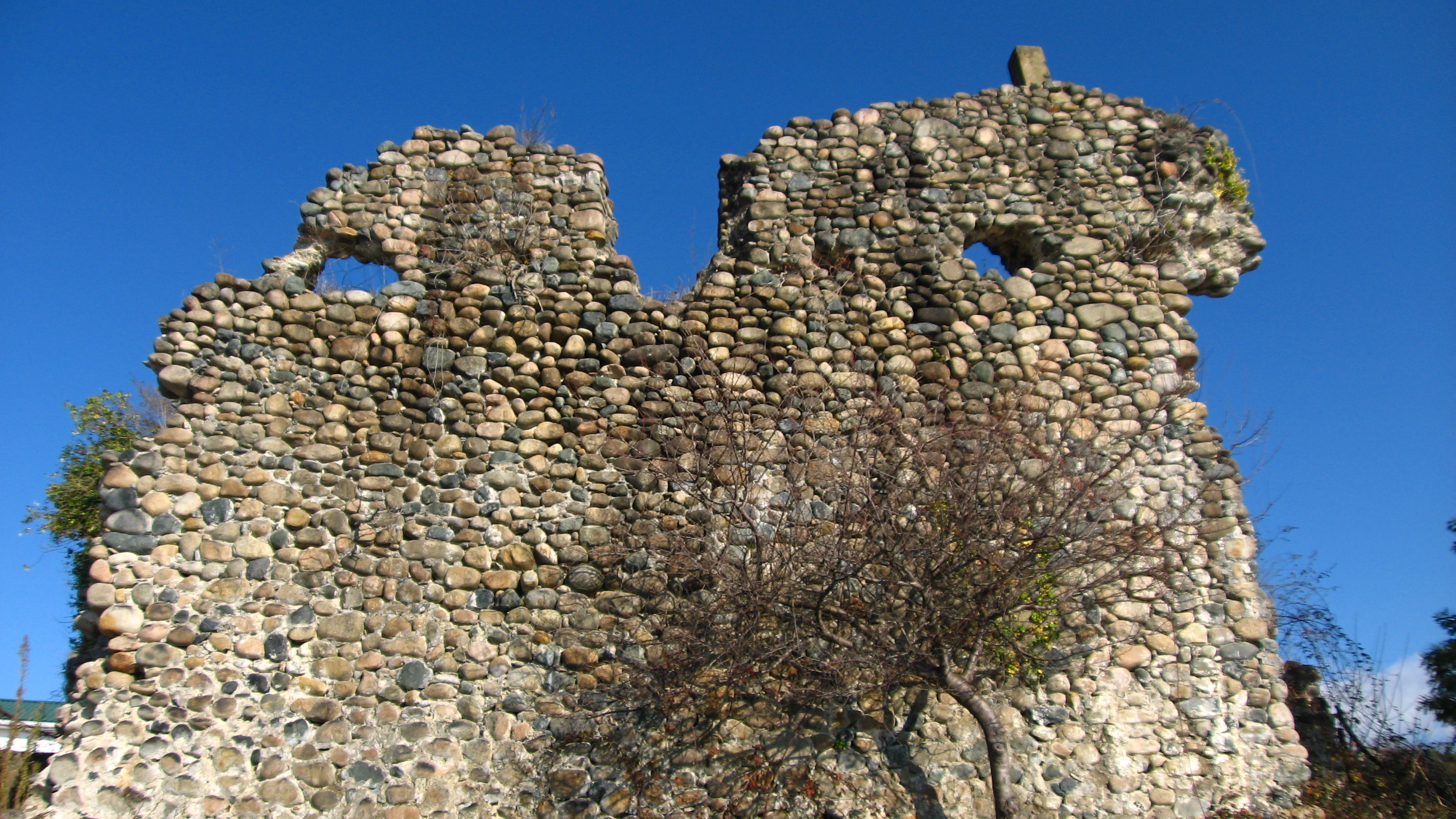
Kelasuri Wall

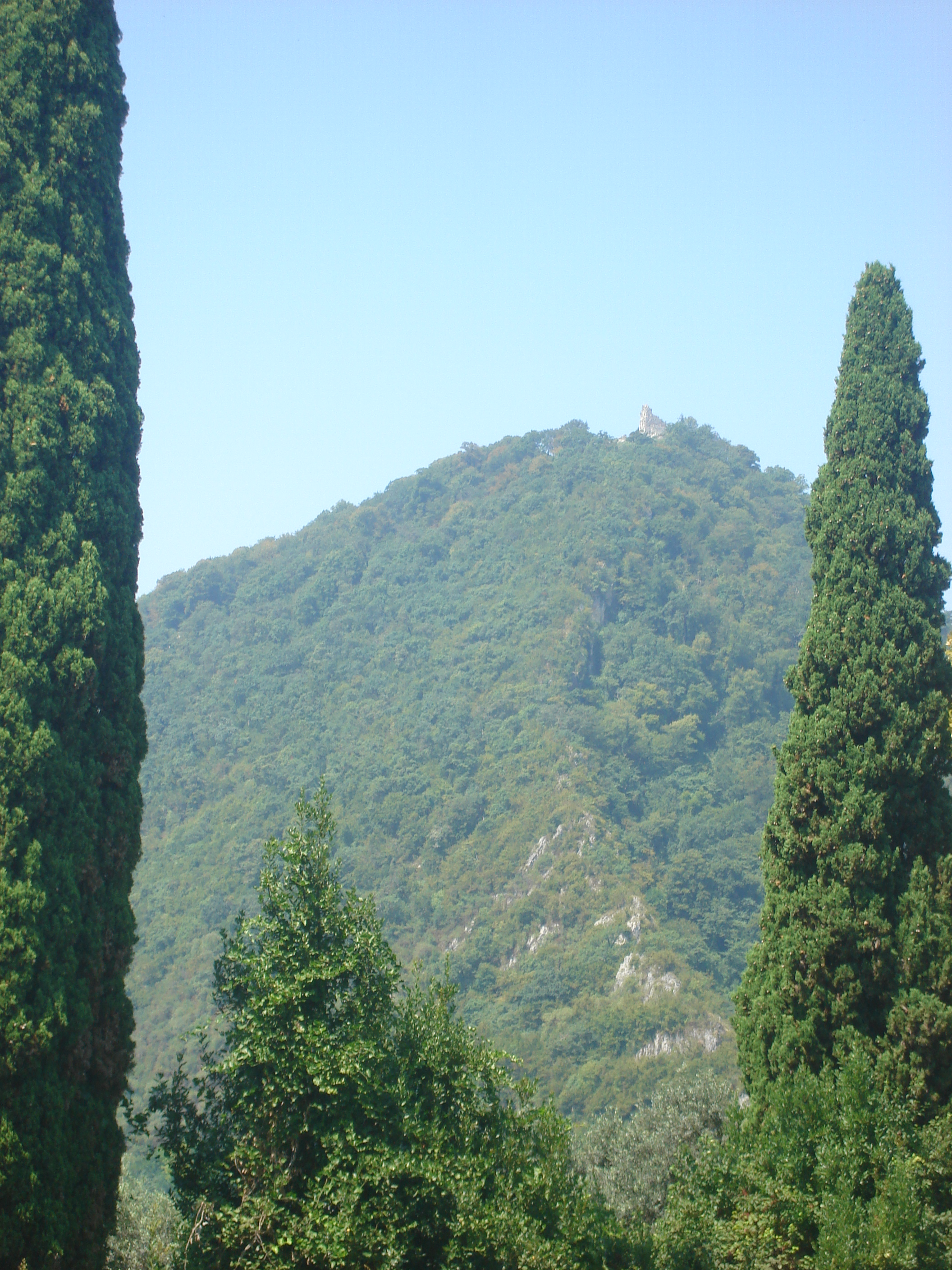
Iverian Mountain

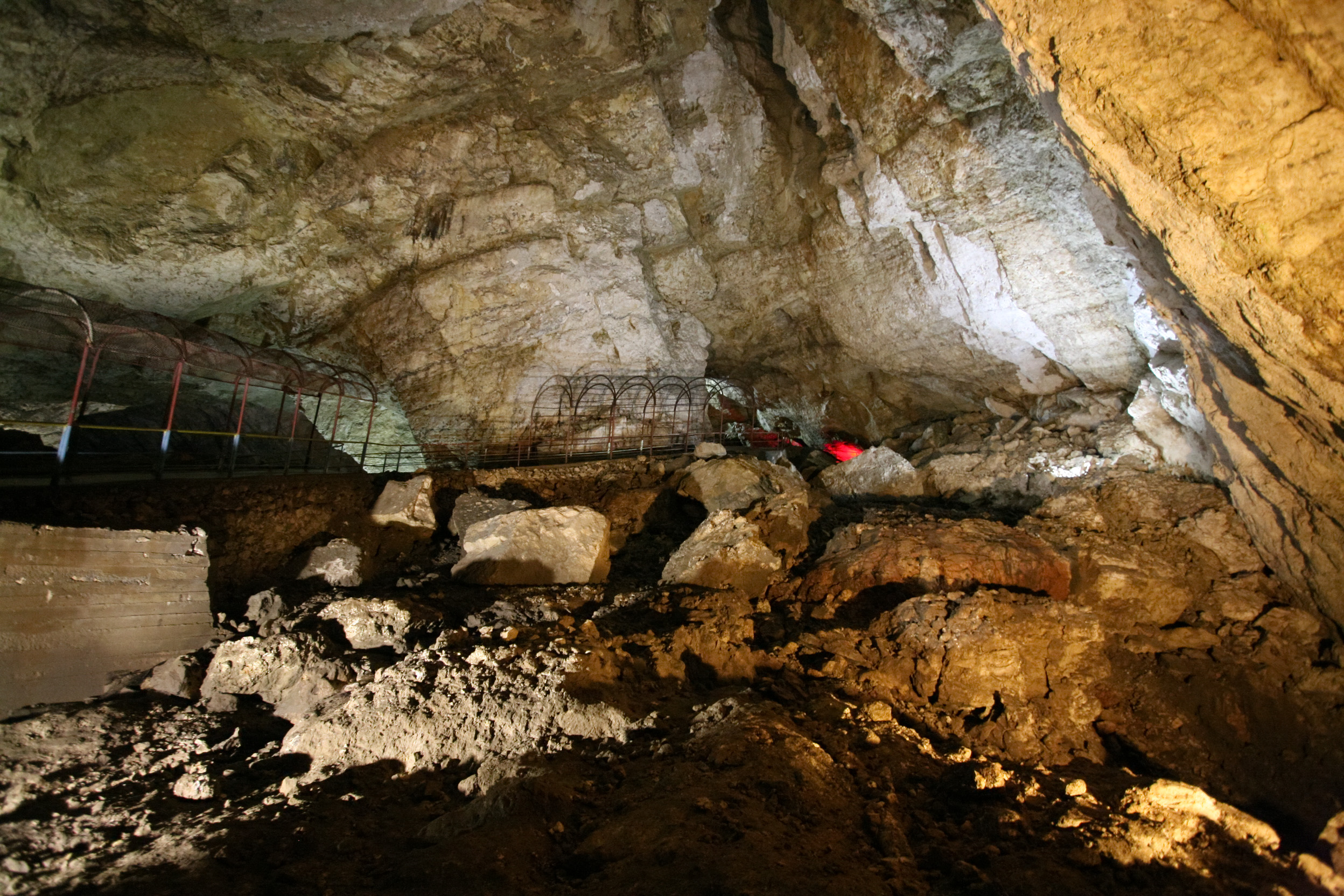
New Athos Cave

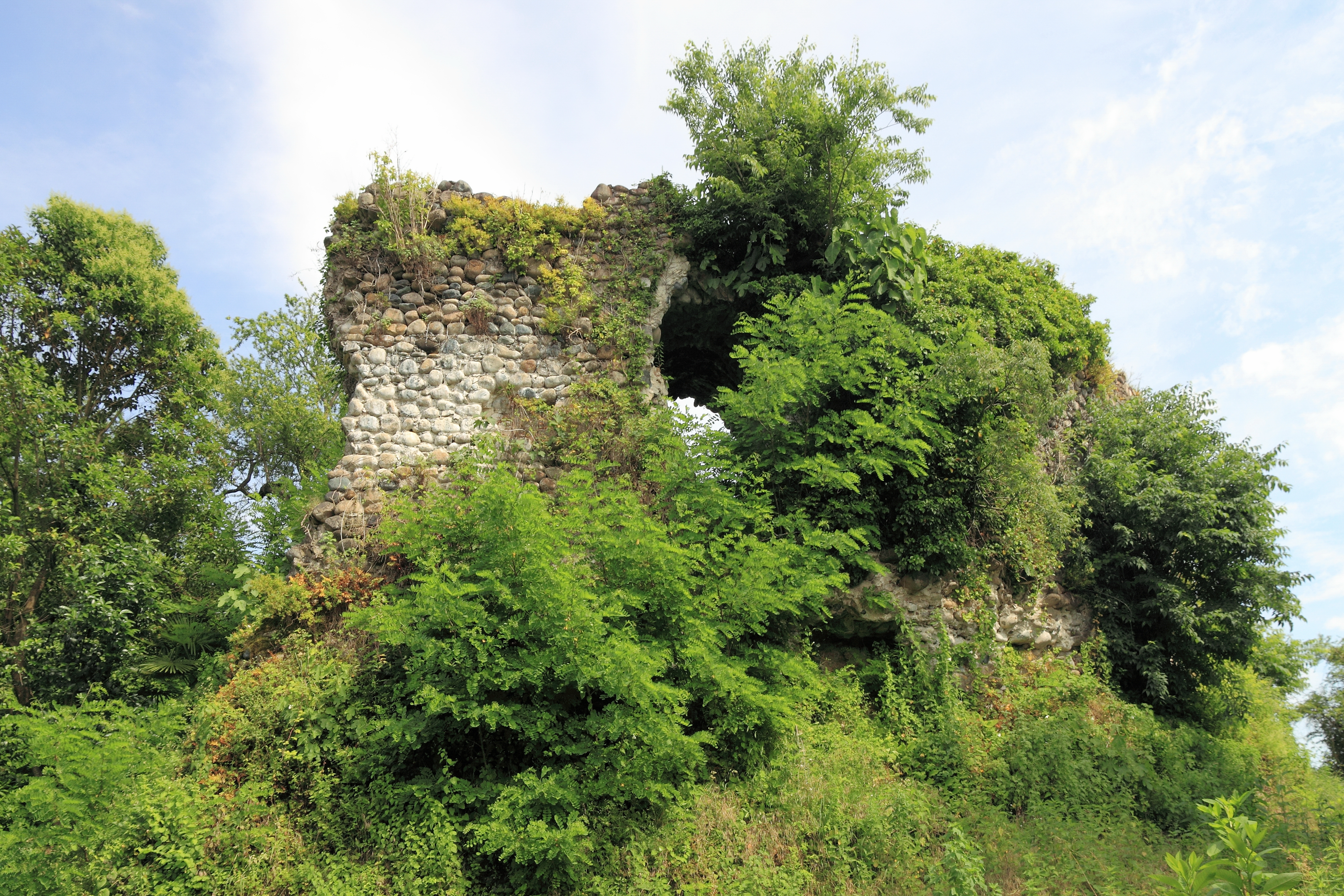
Bagrat's Castle

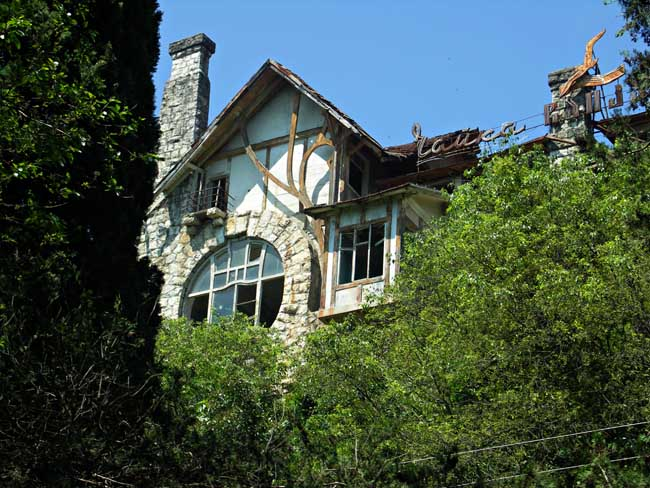
Palace of the Prince of Oldenburg

Abkhazia lies on the coast of the Black Sea, and as such, much of its tourism appeal is derived from its coastal resort towns. A number of resort facilities exist in easy and cheap reach of Russian tourists, with Sukhumi and Gagra two of the most popular towns. Tourism is most prevalent in the region's north. Some of the tourist attractions include:

- Sukhumi Botanical Garden
- Besleti Bridge
- Sukhumi Lighthouse
- Kelasuri Wall
- Lake Ritsa
- New Athos Monastery
- Iverian Mountain
- New Athos Cave
- Krubera Cave, the second deepest known cave on Earth
- Bagrat's Castle

== Legal status ==
As part of organized tourist groups from travel companies registered in Abkhazia or in Russia, tourists from all countries (except Georgia) can visit Abkhazia without an Abkhazian visa by land only through Russia, for a period of no more than 24 hours. Crossing the border with Abkhazia from Russia is free, but according to the Georgian law visitors may only enter Abkhazia from Georgia. (In practice, it is impossible for tourists to enter Abkhazia from Georgia, since the only checkpoint between them is open only to Abkhaz citizens and residents, barring special exceptions.) Despite that, the fact of crossing the border is easy to hide because Abkhazian customs officials don't make any stamps in visitors' passports since 2014.

== See also ==
- Visa policy of Abkhazia
