= Lakoba =

Lakoba (Abkhaz or Russian: Лакоба) is an Abkhaz surname. Notable people with the surname include:

- Iakub Lakoba (1949–2022), Abkhaz politician
- Nestor Lakoba (1893–1936), Abkhaz Communist leader
- Sariya Lakoba (1904–1939), wife of Nestor
- Stanislav Lakoba (1953–2025), Abkhaz academic and politician
