= Nestor Lakoba =

Abkhazian communist leader

- Нестор Лакоба ნესტორ ლაკობა
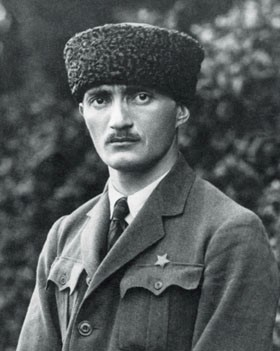
- Lakoba in 1931

1st Chairman of the Council of People's Commissars of the Soviet Socialist Republic of Abkhazia
- In office February 1922 – 17 April 1930
- Preceded by: Post created
- Succeeded by: Avksenty Rapava

Chairman of the Central Executive Committee of the Abkhaz ASSR
- In office 17 April 1930 – 28 December 1936
- Preceded by: Post created
- Succeeded by: Alexei Agrba

Personal details
- Born: Nestor Apollonovich Lakoba; 1 May 1893 Lykhny, Sukhum Okrug, Kutais Governorate, Russian Empire
- Died: 28 December 1936 (aged 43) Tbilisi, Georgian SSR, Soviet Union
- Cause of death: Poisoning
- Citizenship: Soviet
- Party: RSDLP (Bolsheviks) (1912–1918); Communist Party of the Soviet Union (1918–1936)
- Spouse: Sariya Lakoba
- Children: 1

Nestor Apollonovich Lakoba (Note: Russian: Не́стор Аполло́нович Лако́ба [ˈnʲestər əpɐˈlonəvʲɪtɕ lɐˈkobə]; Abkhaz: Нестор Аполлон-иԥа Лакоба, romanized: Nestor Ap’ollon-ipa Lak’oba [ˈnestʼɔr ɑpʼɔlˈlɔnipʰɑ lɑˈkʼɔbɑ]; Georgian: ნესტორ აპოლონის ძე ლაკობა, nest’or ap’olonis dze lak’oba) (1 May 1893 – 28 December 1936) was a Soviet Abkhaz leader. He became a Bolshevik in the early 1910s and helped establish Soviet power in Abkhazia in the aftermath of the Russian Revolution. While in power, Lakoba served as First Chairman of the Council of People's Commissars of the Socialist Soviet Republic of Abkhazia (Note: Nominally a union republic; it was part of the Georgian Soviet Socialist Republic with a special status of a "treaty republic".) from 1922 to 1930, and then as Chairman of the Central Executive Committee of the Abkhaz Autonomous Soviet Socialist Republic until his death in 1936.

Popular in Abkhazia due to his ability to resonate with the people, Lakoba maintained close relationship with Joseph Stalin, which allowed him to enjoy significant autonomy and successfully oppose the extension of collectivization to Abkhazia. Stalin would frequently holiday in Abkhazia during the 1920s and 1930s. This relationship saw Lakoba become the rival of one of Stalin's other confidants, Lavrentiy Beria, who was in charge of the Transcaucasian Socialist Federative Soviet Republic. During a visit to Beria in Tbilisi in December 1936, Lakoba was poisoned, allowing Beria to consolidate his control over Abkhazia and to discredit Lakoba and his family as enemies of the state. Rehabilitated after the death of Stalin in 1953, Lakoba is now revered as a national hero in Abkhazia.

== Early life ==
=== Youth and education ===
Nestor Lakoba was born in the village of Lykhny, in what was then the Sukhum Okrug of the Kutais Governorate in the Russian Empire (now Abkhazia) (Note: Abkhazia is the subject of a territorial dispute between the Republic of Abkhazia and Georgia. The Republic of Abkhazia unilaterally declared independence on 23 July 1992, but Georgia continues to claim it as part of its own sovereign territory. Abkhazia has received formal recognition as an independent state from 7 out of 193 United Nations member states, 3 of which have subsequently withdrawn their recognition.) to a peasant family. He had two brothers, Vasily and Mikhail. His father Apollo (Note: Historian Timothy K. Blauvelt states Lakoba's father's real name was Chichu.) died three months before his birth; Mikhail Bgazhba, who would serve as the First Secretary of Abkhazia, wrote that Apollo Lakoba was shot for opposing the nobles and landowners in the region. Lakoba's mother remarried twice, but both husbands died while Lakoba was young. From ages 10 to 12, Lakoba attended a parish school in New Athos, followed by a further two years of schooling in Lykhny. He entered the Tiflis Seminary in 1905, but he was not interested in its religious syllabus. He read banned books and was frequently caught doing so by the school authorities. Physically unimpressive, he was nearly totally deaf, and used hearing aids throughout his life, though Leon Trotsky recalled it was still difficult to communicate with Lakoba. This became a well-known feature of Lakoba, and he would be jokingly referred to as Adagua (the "Deaf One") by Joseph Stalin.

In 1911, he was expelled from the seminary for revolutionary activity and moved to Batumi, then a major port for exporting oil from the Caucasus, where he taught privately and studied for the gymnasium exam. It was in Batum that Lakoba first became acquainted with the Bolsheviks, working with them from the autumn of 1911 and officially joining them in September 1912. He became involved with disseminating propaganda amongst the workers and peasants in the city and throughout Adjara, the local region, and began to refine his ability to relate to the masses. Discovered by the police, he was forced to leave Batum in 1914, and moved to Grozny, another major oil-based city in the Caucasus, and continued his efforts to spread Bolshevik propaganda among the people. Lakoba continued studying in Grozny, passing his examinations in 1915, and the following year enrolled in law at Kharkov University in what is now Ukraine, but the onset of the First World War and its subsequent effect on Abkhazia led him to quit his studies and return home after only a short time.

=== Early Bolshevik activities ===
Back in Abkhazia, Lakoba took up a position in the Gudauta region helping to build a railway to Russia, while continuing to spread Bolshevik propaganda to the workers. The 1917 February Revolution, which ended the Russian Empire, resulted in the status of Abkhazia becoming contested and unclear. A peasant assembly was created to govern the region, and Lakoba was elected as a representative of Gudauta. Bgazhba wrote that his ability to mingle with the people of the region combined with his speaking abilities made him an ideal choice as representative. Lakoba's reputation was enhanced throughout Abkhazia by helping to establish "Kiaraz" ("Киараз"; "mutual support" in Abkhaz), a peasant brigade that would later help consolidate Bolshevik control.

Lakoba was the leading Bolshevik in Abkhazia when the Revolution began in 1917. Based in Gudauta in the north of Abkhazia, the Bolsheviks opposed the Mensheviks, who were centered in Sukhumi. On 16 February 1918 Lakoba and Efrem Eshba, an Abkhaz Bolshevik, overthrew the Abkhaz People's Council (APC), which had controlled Abkhazia since November 1917. Aided by Russian sailors from warships docked at Sukhumi, the coup only lasted five days as the warships departed, removing the main support for the Bolsheviks, and the APC was able to regain control. Lakoba joined Eshba in April, overthrowing the APC once again and holding power for forty-two days. The Abkhaz People's Council requested assistance from the Transcaucasian Democratic Federative Republic, which had recently declared independence on 9 April 1918. The Transcaucasian authorities dispatched the Georgian People's Guard, which defeated the Bolshevik rebels, allowing the Abkhaz anti-Bolsheviks to regain control over Abkhazia. Seeking protection and security, the APC concluded an agreement on unification with the Democratic Republic of Georgia on 11 June 1918. The Bolsheviks launched another revolt, but it was defeated by the Georgian general Giorgi Mazniashvili. Both Lakoba and Eshba fled to Russia. The APC retained control of Abkhazia and negotiated with the Georgian government over the final status of Abkhazia within Georgia; ultimately, no resolution was reached before the Bolsheviks invaded in 1921.

In the autumn of 1918, Lakoba was ordered to return to Abkhazia, in order to attack the Mensheviks from their rear positions. He was captured by the Mensheviks during this time and imprisoned in Sukhumi, but released early in 1919 due to public opposition. After his release, Nestor Lakoba resumed underground political activities, while outwardly maintaining a lifestyle that appeared respectable to the Menshevik authorities. That April he was offered the post of police commissioner of the Ochamchira District, which he accepted and used as a means to spread Bolshevik propaganda. When the Menshevik authorities became aware of this, Lakoba again left Abkhazia to avoid the arrest sanctioned by the Abkhaz People's Council. He stayed in Batumi for a few months. While he was there, an underground conference of the Bolshevik organizations of Abkhazia was held in August 1919, at which Lakoba was elected deputy chairman of the Sukhumi District Party Committee.

In Batumi, which was controlled by the British occupation force, Lakoba participated in several Bolshevik sabotage operations that disrupted the shipment of weapons, ammunition, and other supplies to the White movement (opponents of the Bolsheviks during the Russian Civil War). One of these involved the bombing of the Kobuleti railway bridge to disrupt the delivery of supplies to the White forces and their allies in Ukraine and Crimea. He also participated in the bombing of the steamship Vozrozhdenie ("Rebirth"), which was carrying weapons and ammunition for the forces of General Pyotr Wrangel. Lakoba also participated in the assassination of White Army General Vladimir Liakhov.

In 1921, Lakoba married Sariya Dzhikh-Ogly. Born to a wealthy family in Batumi, her father was ethnically Adjaran while her mother was Abkhazian and originally from Ochamchire. They had met a couple years before when Lakoba was hiding from the British occupation forces. The following year they had their only child, a son named Rauf. The family was close, with Lakoba helping his wife get an education, and providing the same to Rauf as well. Sariya came to be regarded as an excellent hostess, and her sister-in-law Adile Abbas-Ogly wrote that she was well known in Moscow for this, and a key reason Stalin would take vacations in Abkhazia.

== Leader of Abkhazia ==
=== Establishment as leader ===
Lakoba returned to Abkhazia in 1921, during the Soviet invasion of Georgia. By that time, a Revolutionary Committee (Revkom) had been established in Abkhazia on 18 February 1921, led by Bolshevik Isak Zhvania, with Mikheil Chaguria among its members. During the initial phase of the establishment of Soviet rule in Abkhazia, Efrem Eshba and Lakoba were absent from Abkhazia, having been sent on a mission to Turkey. Along with Eshba and Nikolai Akirtava, Lakoba was one of the signatories on a telegram to Vladimir Lenin announcing the formation of the Socialist Soviet Republic of Abkhazia (SSR Abkhazia). The Revkom, which took control of Abkhazia, resigned on 17 February 1922, and Lakoba was unanimously elected the Chairman of the Council of People's Commissars, a body that was formed that day, thus effectively the head of Abkhazia. He would hold this post until 17 April 1930, when the council was abolished and replaced by a Presidium of the Central Executive Committee, though Lakoba would retain the top position. Though held in high regard by his fellow revolutionaries, Lakoba never held a significant role within the Communist Party and refused to attend any meetings, instead using his patronage network to establish himself.

=== Lakoba in power ===
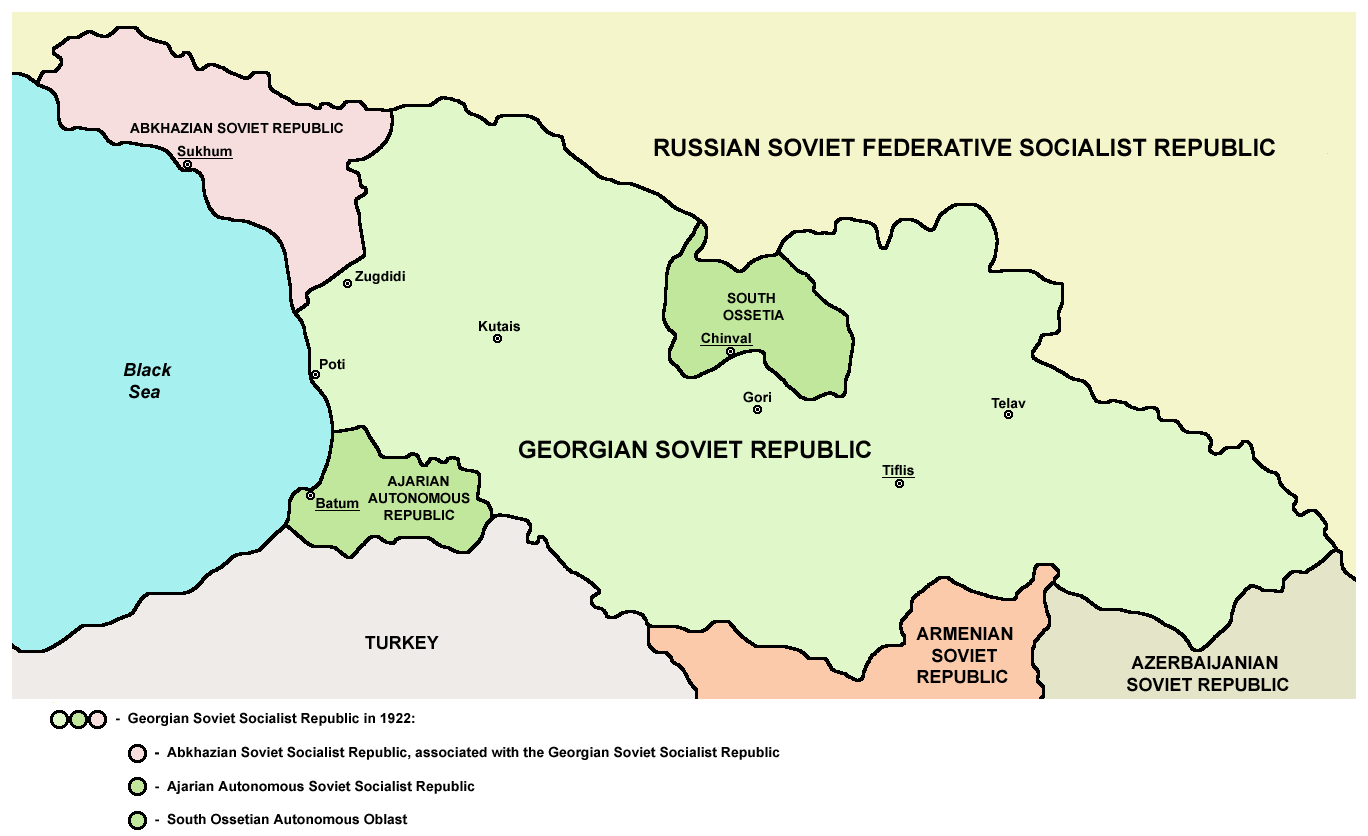
The Georgian SSR as it appeared in 1922. The SSR Abkhazia is highlighted in pink.

Long a friend of several leading Bolsheviks, including Sergo Orjonikidze, Sergei Kirov, and Lev Kamenev, it was his relationship with Stalin that was most important to Lakoba's rise to power. Stalin was fond of Lakoba as they had much in common with each other: both were from the Caucasus, both grew up fatherless (Stalin's father had moved away for work when Stalin was young), and they both attended the same seminary school. Stalin admired Lakoba's marksmanship, as well as his work during the Civil War. Familiar with Abkhazia from his revolutionary days, Stalin had a dacha built in the region and vacationed there throughout the 1920s. He would joke, "I am Koba, and you are Lakoba" ("Я Коба, а ты Лакоба" in Russian; Koba was one of Stalin's pseudonyms as a revolutionary).

It was the role that Lakoba played in Stalin's own rise to power that cemented his status as Stalin's close confidant. When Lenin died in January 1924, Leon Trotsky, who was Stalin's only serious rival for the leadership, was in Sukhumi for health reasons. Lakoba ensured that Trotsky was isolated during the immediate aftermath of Lenin's death and funeral, an act which helped Stalin to consolidate his own power. Though the two possibly met during the Civil War, Lakoba and Stalin became properly acquainted at the Thirteenth Party Congress in Moscow, held in May 1924.

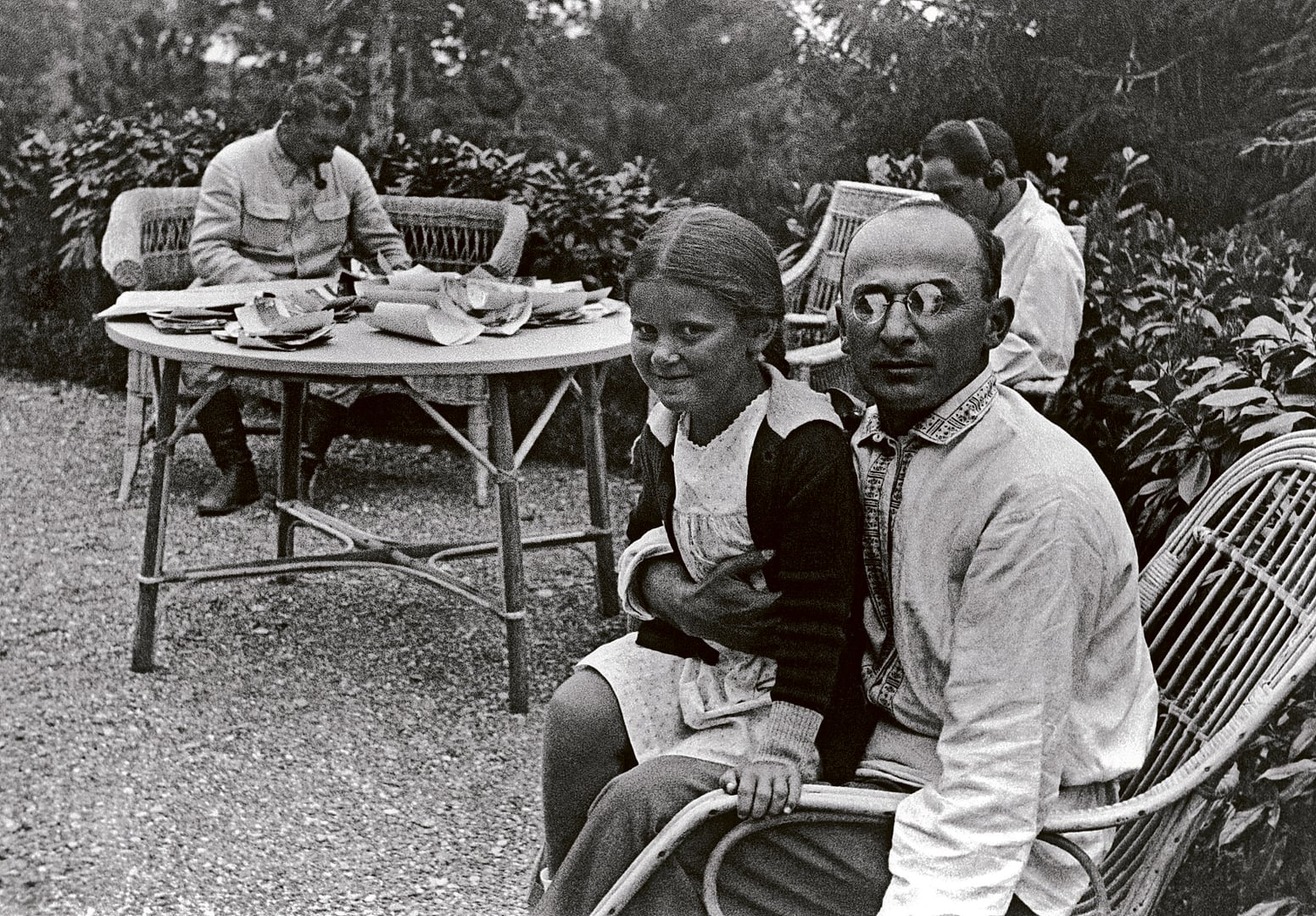
Nestor Lekoba (wearing headphones) with Joseph Stalin in the background and Lavrentiy Beria with Stalin's daughter Svetlana in the foreground in 1931.

The establishment of the Abkhaz SSR in 1921 was partly connected to the role of Nestor Lakoba and Efrem Eshba, who participated in the negotiations with Turkey that resulted in the signing of the Treaty of Kars. However, Abkhazia never functioned as a separate Soviet republic. On 16 December 1921, Abkhazia signed a special "union treaty" with the Georgian SSR. As a result, Abkhazia became a "treaty republic" associated with Georgia, an unusual status within the Soviet system that lacked a clearly defined legal framework. In practice, its status resembled that of an autonomous republic, and in 1931, it was reorganized as the Abkhaz Autonomous Soviet Socialist Republic within the Georgian SSR, formalizing the existing reality. Abkhazia, as a part of the Georgian SSR, joined the Transcaucasian Socialist Federative Soviet Republic (a union of the Georgian, Armenian, and Azerbaijanian SSRs) when it was founded in 1922. Lakoba oversaw the implementation of korenizatsiya, a policy introduced across the Soviet Union throughout the 1920s that was meant to benefit ethnic minorities, though most of the ethnic Abkhaz promoted were Lakoba's close confidants. In 1925, a commission led by I. Azatian, an Armenian, was sent by the Transcaucasian central executive committee to investigate the situation in Abkhazia. The commission reported that the Abkhaz authorities under Nestor Lakoba were conducting the policy of "Abkhazification", giving privileges to the ethnic Abkhazians and establishing an "oligarchic rule" over Georgians, essentially conducting Abkhaz nationalist policy under the guise of Soviet one. The report noted that all major posts were held by the Abkhaz, they were overrepresented in the local structures such as the police, and the local Komsomol was only admitting ethnic Abkhazians. The ethnic Abkhaz only constituted roughly 25–30% of the population during the 1920s and 1930s, which included significant numbers of Georgians, Russians, Armenians, and Greeks.

=== Development of Abkhazia ===
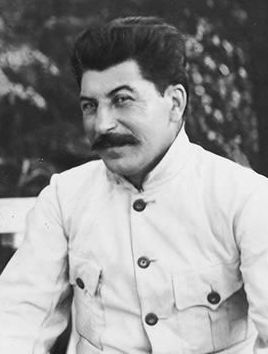
It was due to his close relationship with Stalin that Lakoba was allowed to develop Abkhazia independently.

A proponent of developing Abkhazia, Lakoba oversaw massive industrialization policies like the establishment of a coal mining operation near the town of Tkvarcheli, though they did not have a large impact on the overall economic strength of the region. Other projects included building new roads and railways, the drainage of wetlands as a preventive measure against malaria, and increased forestry. Agriculture was also given prominence, particularly tobacco: by the 1930s Abkhazia supplied up to 52 percent of all tobacco exports from the USSR. Other agricultural products, including tea, wine, and citrus fruits—especially tangerines—were produced in large quantities, making Abkhazia one of the most prosperous regions in the entire Soviet Union, and considerably richer than Georgia. The export of these products turned the region into "an island of prosperity in a war-ravaged Caucasus". Education was also a major issue for Lakoba, who oversaw the construction of many new schools throughout Abkhazia: aided by the korenizatsiia policies that promoted local ethnic groups, many schools teaching in Abkhaz were opened in the 1920s, as well as schools in Georgian, Armenian, and Greek. In recognition of his leadership, on 15 March 1935 Lakoba and Abkhazia were both awarded the Order of Lenin, though the ceremony was pushed back until the next year in order to coincide with the fifteenth anniversary of the establishment of the Bolsheviks in Abkhazia. In December 1935, whilst in Moscow, Lakoba was given the Order of the Red Banner in recognition of his efforts during the Civil War.

The implementation of collectivization across the Soviet Union, which began in 1928, proved to be a major issue for both Abkhazia and Lakoba. Traditional Abkhaz agricultural practice had seen farming conducted by individual households, though assistance from other families and friends was frequent. The historian Timothy K. Blauvelt has written that Lakoba tried to defer collectivization for the first two years by using a variety of excuses, such as "local conditions", "backwardness" of local agricultural methods, "primitive technology" and the lack of kulaks in Abkhazia, although Blauvelt believes that it was Lakoba's relationship with Stalin together with the remote location of Abkhazia that delayed collectivization. Lakoba's refusal to introduce the policy led to further disputes between him and the Abkhaz Party, which was stopped by Stalin, who rebuked the Party for "not taking into consideration the specific particularities of the Abkhazian situation, imposing sometimes the policy of mechanically transferring Russian forms of socialist construction onto Abkhazian soil".

Lakoba kept peace in Abkhazia by ignoring Marxian class theory and protecting former landowners and nobles. This led to a 1929 report that called for him to be removed from power. Stalin prevented this, but criticized Lakoba for his mistake of "seeking support in all layers of the population" (which was contrary to Bolshevik policy). As a leader, Lakoba resisted the collectivisation and proved to be very popular with the populace, which contrasted with other ethnic minority leaders across the Soviet Union, who were usually mistrusted by the locals and regarded as representatives of the state. He visited the villages of Abkhazia, and as Bgazhba wrote, "Lakoba wanted to be familiar with the living conditions of the peasants". In contrast to other Bolshevik leaders, Lakoba was quiet and elegant and avoided shouting to make his point. He was especially known for his accessibility to the people. A 1924 report by the journalist Zinaida Rikhter said that:

"In Sukhum, only in the reception room of the presidium can we but get an idea of the peasant identity of Abkhazia. To Nestor, as the peasants simply call him one on one, they come with any little thing, bypassing all official channels, in certainty that he will hear them out and make a decision. The head of Abkhazia, Comrade Lakoba, is loved by the peasants and by the entire population."

By January 1931 the Party had forced the issue, sending activists across Abkhazia to coerce peasants into collectives. There were large-scale protests in January and February against the changes. Lakoba proved unable to fully stop collectivization, though he was able to reduce the severity of some of the most extreme measures, and stop mass deportations.

=== Rivalry with Beria ===
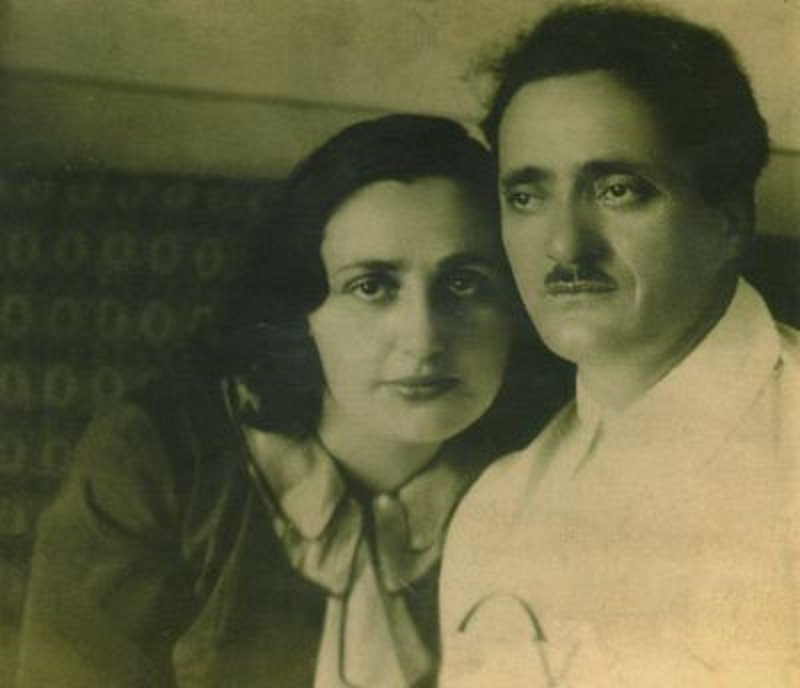
Lakoba with his wife, Sariya, 1930s.

Lakoba was also influential in the rise of Lavrentiy Beria. It was on Lakoba's suggestion that Stalin first met Beria, an ethnic Mingrelian who was born and raised in Abkhazia. Beria had served as the head of the Georgian secret police since 1926, and in November 1931 with Lakoba's support he was named the Second Secretary of Transcaucasia, as well as First Secretary of Georgia, and was promoted to First Secretary of Transcaucasia in October 1932. Lakoba supported Beria's rise because he felt that as a young native of Abkhazia, Beria would be obedient to Lakoba, whereas previous officials had not been. That Beria lacked any direct access to Stalin was also important, as it meant Lakoba could maintain his individually strong relationship with Stalin. Blauvelt has suggested that Lakoba wanted Beria in power to help quash accusations dating back to 1929 that maintained he was abusing his power: a report presented to the Central Committee in 1930 exonerated Lakoba, due in the main to a lack of evidence and the intercession by Stalin. Beria's role as head of the Georgian secret police allowed him to heavily influence any investigations.

Once in this position, Beria began to undermine Lakoba and to gain closer access to Stalin. Lakoba, who grew to despise Beria, sought to discredit him. At one point Lakoba told fellow Bolshevik Sergo Ordzhonikidze that Beria once said that Ordzhonikidze "would have shot all the Georgians in Georgia if it was not for [Beria]" when he led the invasion of Georgia in 1921, and discussed the rumour that Beria had worked as a double agent against the Bolsheviks in Azerbaijan in 1920. The relationship between Beria and Lakoba deteriorated as each tried to become closer to Stalin, and Lakoba retained his close relationship.

In 1933, Beria apparently staged an event to try and win the support of Stalin, who was staying at his dacha in Gagra, in the north of Abkhazia. (Note: There are different interpretations of this event: Stanislav Lakoba has suggested one version, while Beria's son, Sergo, has written a different account.) On 23 September, Stalin went for a short boat ride on the Black Sea, which his dacha overlooked, using the Red Star, a small boat which was not equipped for the open waters. Stalin, Beria, Klim Voroshilov and a few other passengers intended to go along the shore for a few hours. As they approached their destination for a picnic, near the town of Pitsunda, three rifle shots landed in the water near the boat, coming from either the lighthouse or a border post. None of the shots were close, though Beria later recounted that he covered Stalin's body with his own. Initially Stalin joked about the incident, though he later sent someone to investigate, and received a letter from the border guard who apparently took the shots, asking for forgiveness and explaining he thought it was a foreign vessel. Beria's own investigation blamed Lakoba for the policy to shoot at unknown ships, but the matter was dropped on the orders of Beria's superiors when rumours began to spread that the entire incident was staged to frame Lakoba.

Nestor Lakoba, Nikita Khrushchev, Lavrenti Beria and Aghasi Khanjian at the opening of the Moscow Metro in 1936, the same year Lakoba and Khanjian were killed by Beria. In 1953, Khrushchev had Beria executed.

Another source of contention between Beria and Lakoba concerned the publication in 1934 of Stalin and Khashim (Сталин и Хашим in Russian). The book chronicled a period of Stalin's life as a revolutionary, when in 1901–1902, he hid with a villager named Khashim Smyrba near Batumi. This showed Stalin as someone who was close to the people, something that Stalin enjoyed hearing. Ostensibly written by Lakoba, the book was praised by Stalin, who enjoyed the description of Khashim as "simple, naïve, but honest and devoted." In response, Beria began a project to chronicle Stalin's entire time as a revolutionary in the Caucasus. The finished work, On the Question of the History of the Bolshevik Organizations in the Transcaucasus (К вопросу об истории большевистских организаций в Закавказье) falsely enhanced and aggrandized Stalin's role in the region. When it was serialised in Pravda, Beria became well known across the entire Soviet Union.

Beginning in 1935, Stalin made overtures to Lakoba to move to Moscow and replace Genrikh Yagoda as the head of the NKVD, the Soviet secret police. Lakoba turned down the offer in December 1935, content to stay in Abkhazia. This outright refusal of such an offer only led to trouble for Lakoba, as it caused Stalin's goodwill to begin to dissipate.

== Death ==
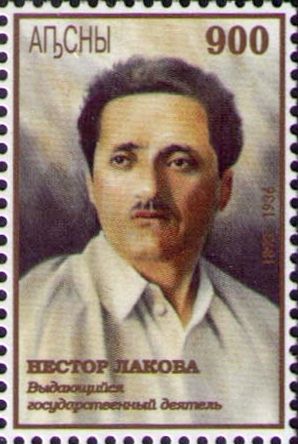
Lakoba on a 1997 Abkhazian postal stamp. He is regarded as a national hero in Abkhazia.

As Lakoba was popular in Abkhazia and well-liked by Stalin, it was difficult for Beria to have him removed. Instead, on 26 December 1936 Beria summoned Lakoba to the Party headquarters in Tbilisi, ostensibly to explain his recent interactions with Stalin. Beria had Lakoba over for dinner the next day, where he was served fried trout, a favorite of Lakoba's and a glass of poisoned wine. They attended the opera after the dinner, watching the play Mzetchabuki (მზეჭაბუკი; "Sun-boy" in Georgian). During the performance Lakoba showed the first signs of his poisoning and returned to his hotel room, where he died early the next morning. Officially, Lakoba was said to have died of a heart attack, though a previous medical examination in Moscow had shown he had arteriosclerosis (thickening of the arteries), cardiosclerosis (thickening of the heart), and erysipelas (skin inflammation) in the left auricle that had led to his hearing loss. His body was returned to Sukhumi, though notably all the internal organs (which could have helped identify the cause of death), were removed.

Knight suggests that Stalin must have authorised Lakoba's murder, as Beria would not have dared to kill someone as prominent as Lakoba without his leader's approval. It is notable that though telegrams of condolence came from various leading officials throughout the Soviet Union, Stalin himself did not send one, and did not attempt to look into what role, if any, Beria may have played in Lakoba's death. Lakoba was accused of "nationalist deviationism", of having helped Trotsky, and of trying to kill both Stalin and Beria.

Despite the immediate denunciations, Lakoba was laid in state in Sukhumi for two days, and was given an elaborate state funeral on 31 December, which 13,000 people attended, though not Beria (though he did help take the coffin back to Sukhumi). The first female Abkhazian aviator Meri Avidzba circled her aircraft overhead as part of the funeral. Initially buried in the Sukhumi Botanical Garden, Lakoba's body was moved the first night to St. Michael's Cemetery in Sukhumi, where it stayed for several years before being returned to its original place. According to Nikita Khrushchev's memoirs, Beria had Lakoba's body exhumed and burned on the pretext that an "enemy of the people" did not deserve burial in Abkhazia; this may possibly have been done to hide evidence of poisoning.

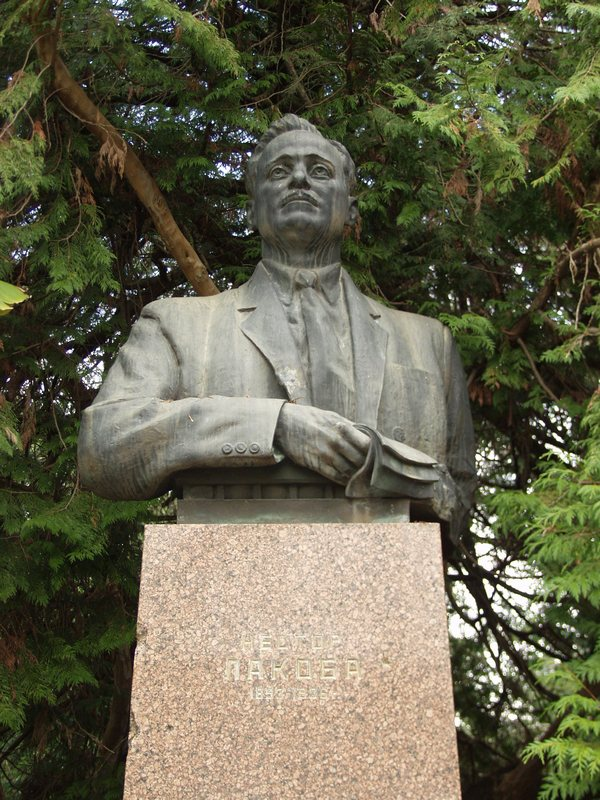
The statue of Lakoba in the Sukhumi Botanical Garden. It was erected in 1959, after Lakoba had been rehabilitated.

In the months that followed Lakoba's death, members of his family were implicated on charges against the state. His two brothers were arrested on 9 April 1937, and his mother and Sariya were arrested on 23 August of that year. A trial of thirteen members of Lakoba's family was conducted between 30 October and 3 November 1937 in Sukhumi, with charges including counter-revolutionary activities, subversion and sabotage, espionage, terrorism, and insurgent organization in Abkhazia. Nine of the defendants, including Lakoba's two brothers, were shot on the night of 4 November. Rauf, Lakoba's 15-year-old son, tried to speak to Beria, who visited Sukhumi to view the start of the trial. He was promptly arrested as well. Sariya was taken to Tbilisi and tortured in order to extract a statement implicating Lakoba, but refused, even after Rauf was tortured in front of her. Sariya died in prison in Tbilisi on 16 May 1939. Rauf was sent to a labour camp, and was eventually shot in a Sukhumi prison on 28 July 1941.

== Legacy ==
During the remainder of the Stalinist era, Lakoba was seen as an "enemy of the people", and he was only rehabilitated in 1953. A statue was built in his honour in the Sukhumi Botanical Gardens in 1959, and he was subsequently honoured in Abkhazia. In 1965, Mikhail Bgazhba, the First Secretary of the Abkhaz Communist Party from 1958 until 1965, wrote a short biography of Lakoba, largely rehabilitating him. In Abkhazia, he is revered as a hero, and associated with its first major success of culture and development.

A museum dedicated to the life of Lakoba was established in Sukhumi, though it burnt down during the 1992–1993 war in Abkhazia. Plans to build a new museum were announced by the de facto Abkhaz government in 2016. After his death, Lakoba's collected papers were initially buried to keep them from being destroyed. They were retrieved several years later by his brother-in-law, the only member of his family to survive. The papers were first brought to Batumi, Georgia. Starting in the 1980s they were slowly returned to Abkhazia, with many eventually given to Princeton and Stanford Universities.

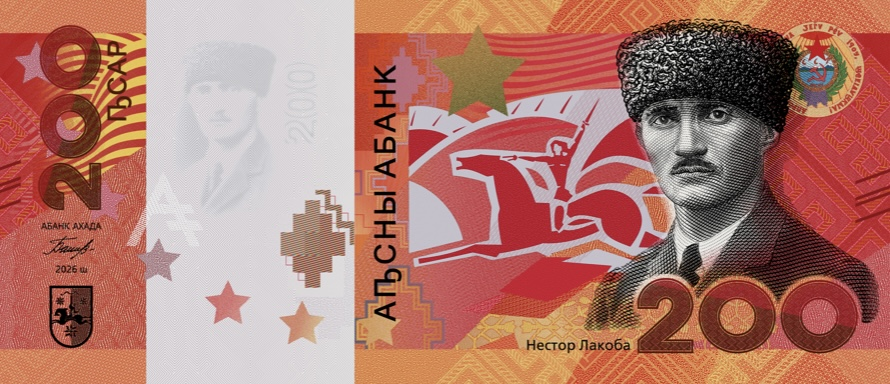
200 apsars banknote

A commemorative "Nestor Lakoba" Abkhazian apsar banknote with a face value of 200 apsars was released by the National Bank of the Republic of Abkhazia in June 2026.

== Bibliography ==
- Abbas-Ogly, Adile (2005), Моя Абхазия: моя судьба [My Abkhazia: My Fate] (in Russian), Moscow: ACT, ISBN 978-5-1705-9741-3
- Anchabadze, Yu. D.; Argun, Yu. G. (2012), Абхазы [The Abkhazians] (in Russian), Moscow: Nauka, ISBN 978-5-02-035538-5
- Bgazhba, Mikhail (1965), Нестор Лакоба [Nestor Lakoba] (in Russian), Tbilisi: Sabtchota Saqartvelo
- Blauvelt, Timothy (May 2007), "Abkhazia: Patronage and Power in the Stalin Era", Nationalities Papers, 35 (2): 203–232, doi:10.1080/00905990701254318, S2CID 128803263
- Blauvelt, Timothy (2012a), "'From words to action!': Nationality policy in Soviet Abkhazia (1921–38)", in Jones, Stephen F. (ed.), The Making of Modern Georgia, 1918–2012: The first Georgian Republic and its successors, New York City: Routledge, pp. 232–262, ISBN 978-0-415-59238-3
- Blauvelt, Timothy K. (2012b), "Resistance and Accommodation in the Stalinist Periphery: A Peasant Uprising in Abkhazia", Ab Imperio, 2012 (3): 78–108, doi:10.1353/imp.2012.0091, S2CID 154386436
- Blauvelt, Timothy K. (2014), "The Establishment of Soviet Power in Abkhazia: Ethnicity, Contestation and Clientalism in the Revolutionary Periphery", Revolutionary Russia, 27 (1): 22–46, doi:10.1080/09546545.2014.904472, S2CID 144974460
- Blauvelt, Timothy K. (2021), Clientelism and Nationality in an Early Soviet Fiefdom: The Trials of Nestor Lakoba, Milton Park, Abingdon: Routledge, ISBN 978-1-032-01000-7
- Gregory, Paul R. (2013), Women of the Gulag: Portraits of Five Remarkable Lives, Stanford, California: Hoover Institution Press, ISBN 978-0-8179-1576-6
- Hewitt, B.G. (1993), "Abkhazia: a problem of identity and ownership", Central Asian Survey, 12 (3): 267–323, doi:10.1080/02634939308400819
- Hewitt, George (2013), Discordant Neighbours: A Reassessment of the Georgian–Abkhazian and Georgian–South Ossetian Conflicts, Leiden, The Netherlands: Brill, ISBN 978-90-04-24892-2
- Khrushchev, Nikita (2004), Khrushchev, Sergei (ed.), Memoirs of Nikita Khrushchev: Volume I, Commissar (1918–1945), translated by Shriver, George, University Park, Pennsylvania: Pennsylvania State University Press, ISBN 0-271-02332-5
- Knight, Amy W. (1993), Beria: Stalin's First Lieutenant, Princeton, New Jersey: Princeton University Press, ISBN 0-691-01093-5
- Kotkin, Stephen (2017), Stalin, Volume 2: Waiting for Hitler, 1929–1941, New York City: Penguin Press, ISBN 978-1-59420-380-0
- Kuprava, A.E. (2015), "Лакоба, Нестор Аполлонович" [Lakoba, Nestor Apollonovich], in Avidzba, V.Sh. (ed.), Абхазский Биографический Словарь [Abkhaz Biographical Dictionary] (in Russian), Sukhum: Abkhaz Institute of Humanitarian Studies
- Lakoba, Stanislav (2004), Абхазия после двух империй. XIX–XXI вв. [Abkhazia after two empires: XIX–XXI centuries] (in Russian), Moscow: Materik, ISBN 5-85646-146-0
- Lakoba, Stanislav (1995), "Abkhazia is Abkhazia", Central Asian Survey, 14 (1): 97–105, doi:10.1080/02634939508400893
- Lak'oba, Stanislav (1998), "History: 1917–1989", in Hewitt, George (ed.), The Abkhazians: A Handbook, New York City: St. Martin's Press, pp. 89–101, ISBN 978-0-312-21975-8
- Lakoba, Stanislav (1990), Очерки Политической Истории Абхазии [Essays on the Political History of Abkhazia] (in Russian), Sukhumi, Abkhazia: Alashara, OCLC 891495430
- Montefiore, Simon Sebag (2003), Stalin: The Court of the Red Tsar, London: Phoenix, ISBN 978-0-7538-1766-7
- Müller, Daniel (1998), "Demography: ethno-demographic history, 1886–1989", in Hewitt, George (ed.), The Abkhazians: A Handbook, New York City: St. Martin's Press, pp. 218–231, ISBN 978-0-312-21975-8
- Rayfield, Donald (2012), Edge of Empires: A History of Georgia, London: Reaktion Books, ISBN 978-1-78023-030-6
- Saparov, Arsène (2015), From Conflict to Autonomy in the Caucasus: The Soviet Union and the making of Abkhazia, South Ossetia and Nagorno Karabakh, New York City: Routledge, ISBN 978-0-415-65802-7
- Shenfield, Stephen (2010), The Stalin-Beria Terror in Abkhazia, 1936–1953, Sukhum: Abkhaz World
- Slider, Darrell (1985), "Crisis and Response in Soviet Nationality Policy: The Case of Abkhazia", Central Asian Survey, 4 (4): 51–68, doi:10.1080/02634938508400523
- Suny, Ronald Grigor (1994), The Making of the Georgian Nation (Second ed.), Bloomington, Indiana: Indiana University Press, ISBN 978-0-253-20915-3
- Trotsky, Leon (2018), Портреты революционеров [Portraits of Revolutionaries] (in Russian), Moscow: T8RUGRAM, ISBN 978-5-521-06359-8
- Welt, Cory (2012), "A Fateful Moment: Ethnic Autonomy and Revolutionary violence in the Democratic Republic of Georgia (1918–1921)", in Jones, Stephen F. (ed.), The Making of Modern Georgia, 1918–2012: The first Georgian Republic and its successors, New York City: Routledge, pp. 205–231, ISBN 978-0-415-59238-3
- Yesiava, Badri (28 December 2016), Музеи Нестора Лакоба и Баграта Шинкуба появятся в Абхазии [Museums of Nestor Lakoba and Bagrat Shinkub will appear in Abkhazia] (in Russian), Lakoba Museum, archived from the original on 11 March 2022
- Zavodskaya, Yelena (18 May 2018), Станислав Лакоба: "Много тайн нам откроют американские архивы" [Stanislav Lakoba: "A lot of secrets will be revealed to us by the American archives"] (in Russian), Radio Free Europe/Radio Liberty
- Zavodskaya, Yelena (21 May 2014), "Величайшая женщина страны" [The Greatest Woman of the Country] (in Russian), Radio Free Europe/Radio Liberty
- Zürcher, Christoph (2007), The Post-Soviet Wars: Rebellion, Ethnic Conflict, and Nationhood in the Caucasus, New York City: New York University Press, ISBN 978-0-8147-9709-9

== See also ==
- Outline of the Russian Revolution and Civil War
- Bibliography of the Russian Revolution and Civil War
- Bibliography of Stalinism and the Soviet Union
- Index of Old Bolsheviks
- Index of articles related to the Russian Revolution and Civil War
