= Blauvelt (surname) =

Blauvelt is a surname. Notable people with the surname include:

- Abraham Blauvelt (died c. 1663), Dutch privateer
- Andrew Blauvelt (born 1964), Japanese-American curator, designer, educator, and writer
- Christopher Blauvelt, American cinematographer
- George A. Blauvelt (1866–1924), American lawyer and politician
- Harvey Blauvelt (1867–1929), American baseball player
- Lillian Blauvelt (1873–1947), American opera singer
- Timothy K. Blauvelt, professor of Soviet studies
