= Sariya Lakoba =

Soviet woman and victim of the Great Purge (1904–1939)

- Сария Лакоба (Russian)
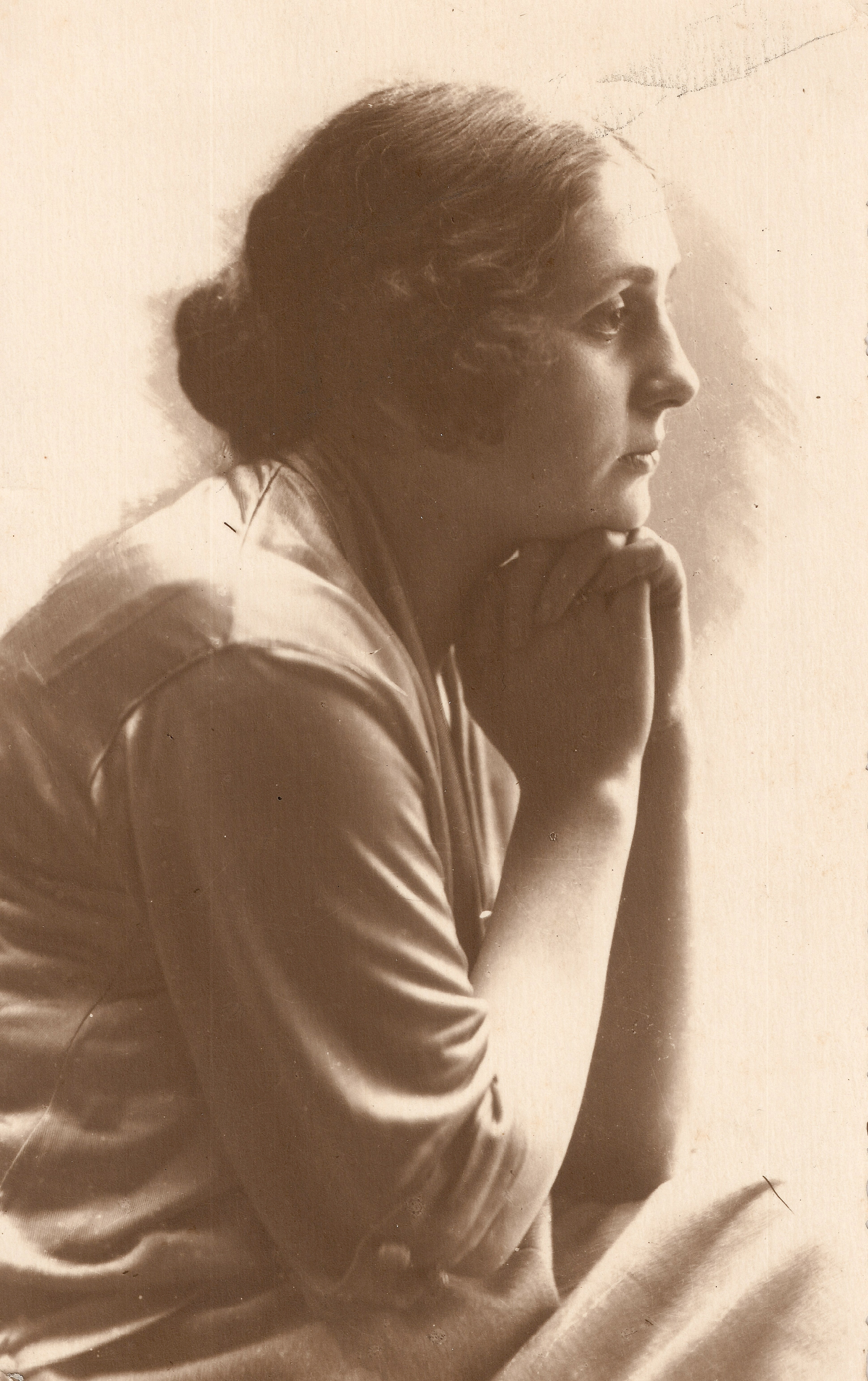
- Born: Sariya Dzhikh-Ogly; 1904; Batum, Batum Oblast, Russian Empire
- Died: 16 May 1939 (aged 34–35); Tbilisi, Georgian SSR, USSR
- Education: Self-educated
- Known for: Resistance against the NKVD during the Great Purge
- Spouse: Nestor Lakoba (m. 1921)
- Children: Rauf Lakoba

Sariya Akhmedovna Lakoba (Russian: Сария Ахмедовна Лакоба; née Dzhikh-Ogly; 1904 – 16 May 1939) was a Soviet woman and a victim of the Great Purge. Born into a wealthy Adjarian noble family in Batum, she was raised in a conservative Muslim household. Although she never finished formal schooling, she was a self-educated polyglot who spoke several languages and was an avid collector of literature.

== Life in Abkhazia ==
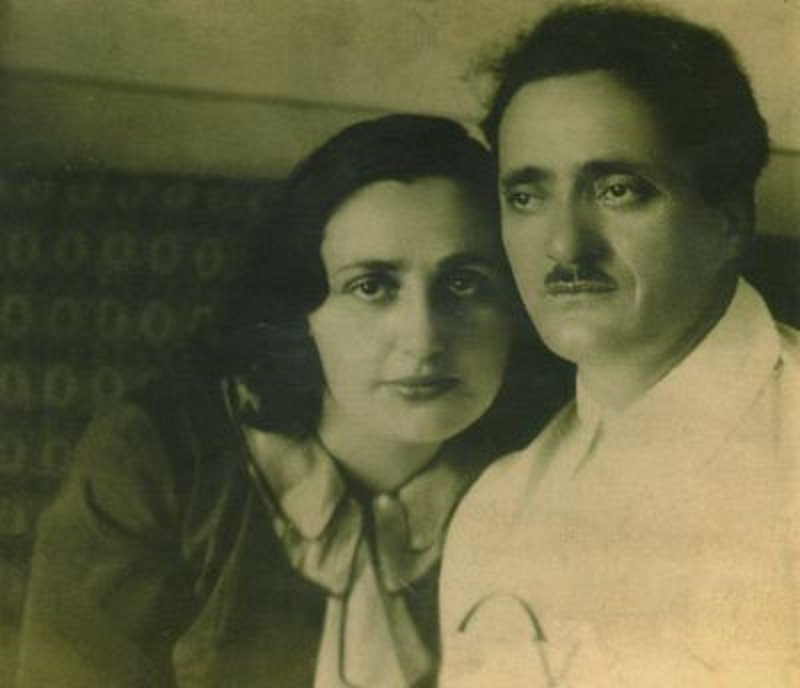
Sariya with her husband, Nestor Lakoba, 1930s.

In 1921, she married Nestor Lakoba, the leader of Abkhazia. Sariya became a prominent figure in the Soviet social circle of the 1920s and 30s, frequently hosting high-ranking government officials in Abkhazia and attending official events in Moscow. She was described as a calm and observant woman who remained deeply committed to her intellectual pursuits.

She maintained a personal friendship with Nadezhda Alliluyeva, the second wife of Joseph Stalin, who gifted Lakoba a handgun. During their vacations in Abkhazia, Stalin and other members of the Soviet leadership were frequent visitors to the Lakoba home.

== Arrest and resistance ==
Following the death of her husband in 1936, Sariya was arrested by the NKVD and imprisoned in Tbilisi. The Soviet authorities subjected her to severe torture every evening for two years, attempting to force her to posthumously denounce Nestor Lakoba as an "enemy of the people."

Sariya consistently refused to sign any statement, famously telling her captors, "I will not defame the memory of my husband." In an attempt to break her resolve, the NKVD arrested her 14-year-old son, Rauf, and beat him in her presence. Sariya continued to resist and eventually died in her cell following a night of torture on 16 May 1939. Rauf Lakoba was subsequently executed in a Sukhum prison on 28 July 1941.

== Bibliography ==
- Lakoba, Stanislav (2004), Абхазия после двух империй. XIX-XXI вв. [Abkhazia after two empires: XIX–XXI centuries] (in Russian), Moscow: Materik, ISBN 978-5-85646-146-5

=== Further reading ===
- Rayfield, Donald (2004). Stalin and His Hangmen: The Tyrant and Those Who Killed for Him. New York City: Random House. ISBN 978-0-37-575771-6.
