= New Athos Monastery =

Orthodox monastery in New Athos, Georgia (Abkhazia)

- ახალი ათონის მონასტერი (in Georgian); Афон Ҿыцтәи аберҭыԥ (in Abkhaz)
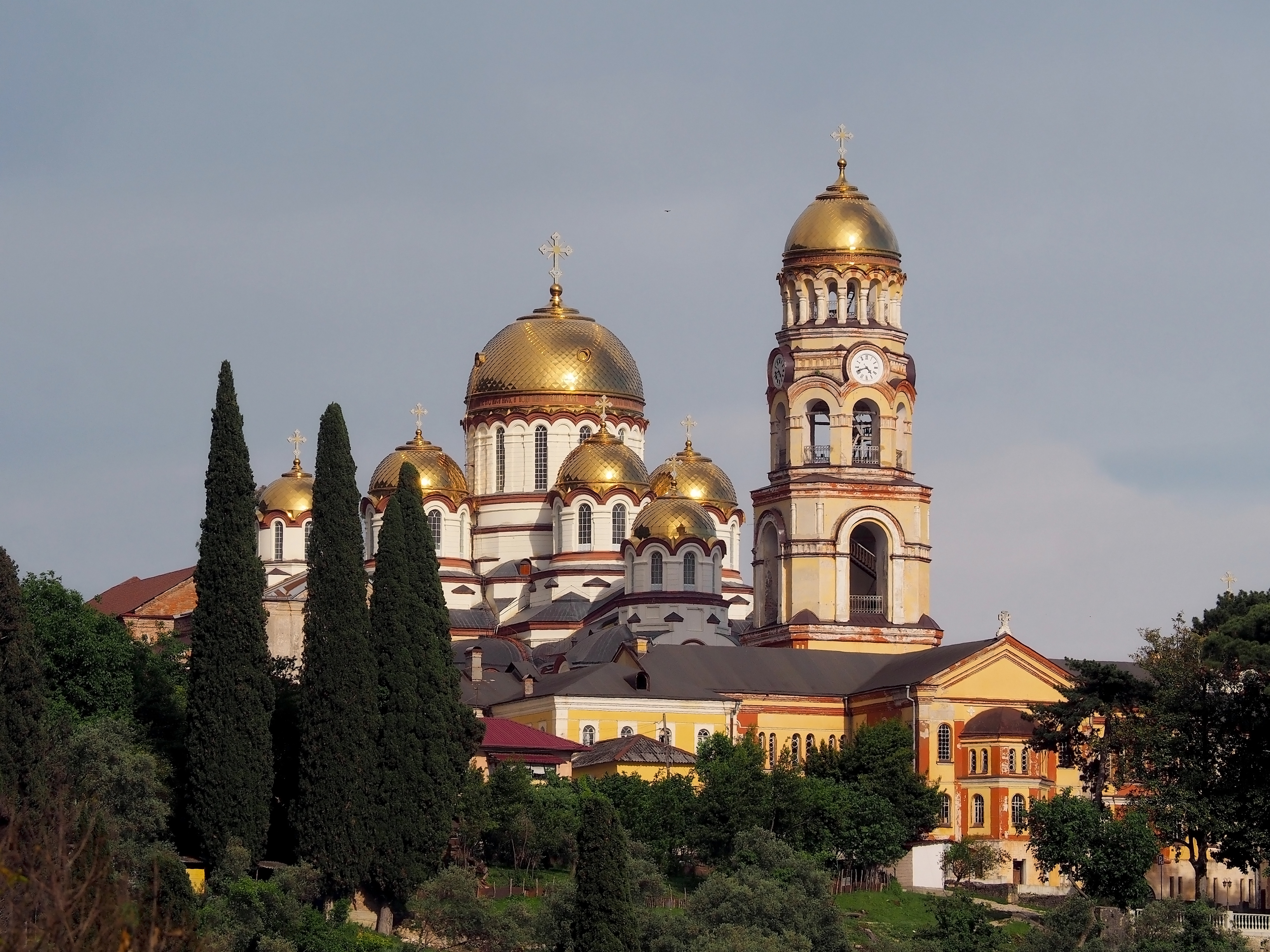
- New Athos Monastery

- Location within Abkhazia Location within Georgia

Monastery information
- Denomination: Georgian Orthodox, Abkhazian Orthodox Church, Holy Metropolis of Abkhazia
- Established: 1875
- Consecrated: 1883-1896

Site
- Location: (Georgia (country)) New Athos, Gudauta District, Abkhazia, Georgia
- Country: Abkhazia
- Coordinates: 43°5′17″N 40°49′15″E
- Website

Cultural Heritage Monument of Georgia
- Official name: St. Panteleimon Monastery/Church
- Designated: March 30, 2006; 20 years ago
- Reference no.: 3549
- Item Number in Cultural Heritage Portal: 9286
- Date of entry in the registry: October 3, 2007; 19 years ago

New Athos Monastery (Georgian: ახალი ათონის მონასტერი, romanized: akhali atonis monast'eri; Abkhaz: Афон Ҿыцтәи аберҭыԥ; Russian: Новоафонский монастырь, Novoafonskiy monastir’) is a monastery in New Athos, municipality of Gudauta, in a breakaway republic of Abkhazia (mostly internationally recognized as a part of Georgia). New Athos Monastery was founded in 1875 by monks who came from the St. Panteleimon Monastery in Mount Athos, with Mount Athos having been an important site for the Orthodox Church since 1054.

== History ==
The unfinished monastery was looted during the Russo-Turkish War during 1877-1878, and the construction works for the monastery continued during the 1880s, with the structure finally being completed in 1900.

In the center of the western building, a building bell tower 50 metres 50 metres (160 ft) (160 ft) high was erected. In the lower part of the bell tower, a monastic refectory is located. In the middle of the monastic complex stands the five-domed Cathedral of St. Panteleimon, in the architecture of which traits of the so-called Neo-Byzantine style are discernible. The interior of the church is embellished with murals, painted between 1911 and 1914. St Panteleimon is the largest Cathedral in Abkhazia.

The monastery was closed between 1924 and 1994 due to the Soviet persecution of religion. After this point, the monastery returned to the Orthodox Church.

The monastery is currently used by the schismatic Holy Metropolis of Abkhazia, while it is also claimed by the schismatic Abkhazian Orthodox Church and the Georgian Orthodox Church.

== Current condition ==
New Athos Monastery was given the status of Immovable Cultural Monument of National Significance in Georgia in 2006, and Mount Athos as a whole was listed as a UNESCO World Heritage Site in 1988.

== Gallery ==
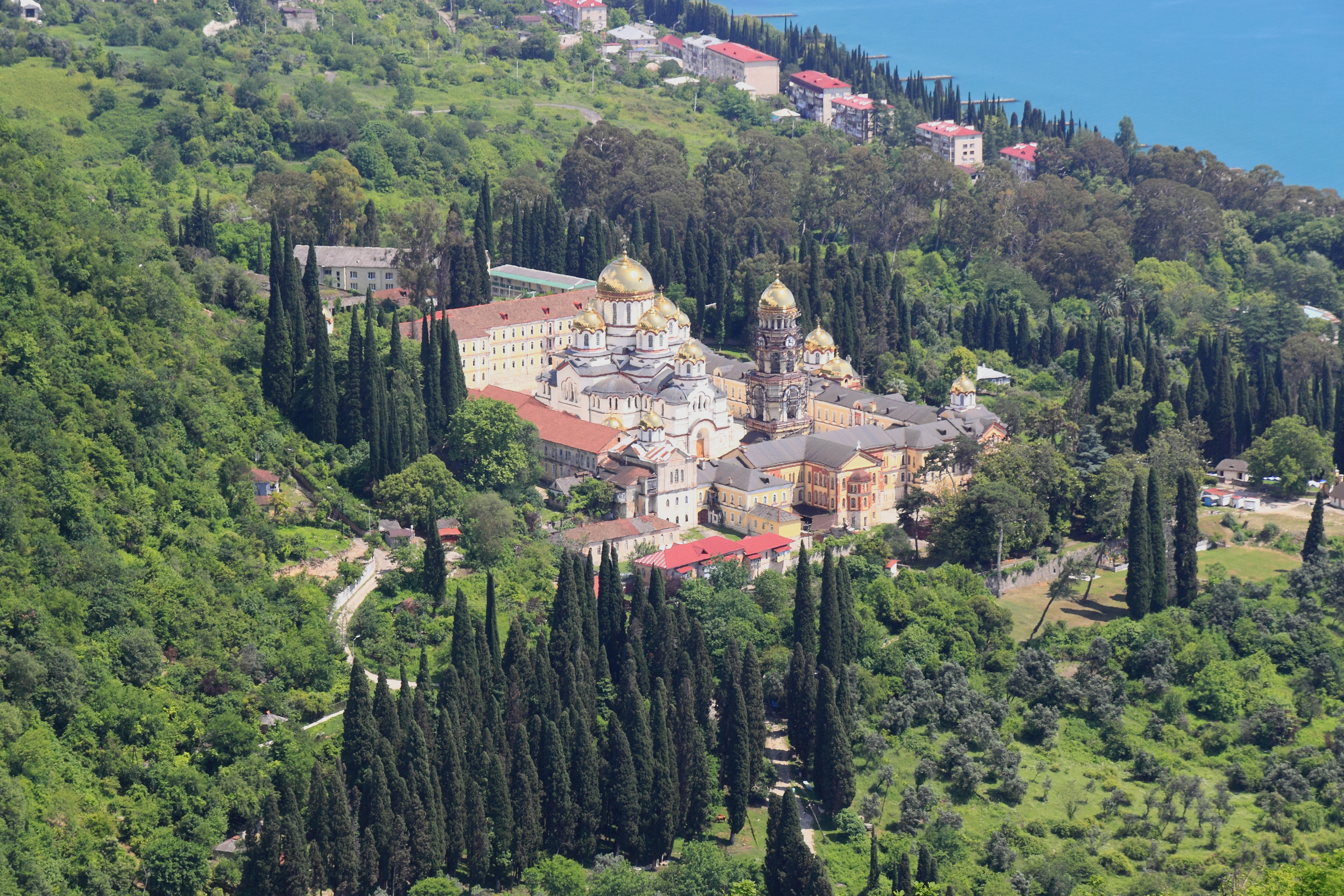

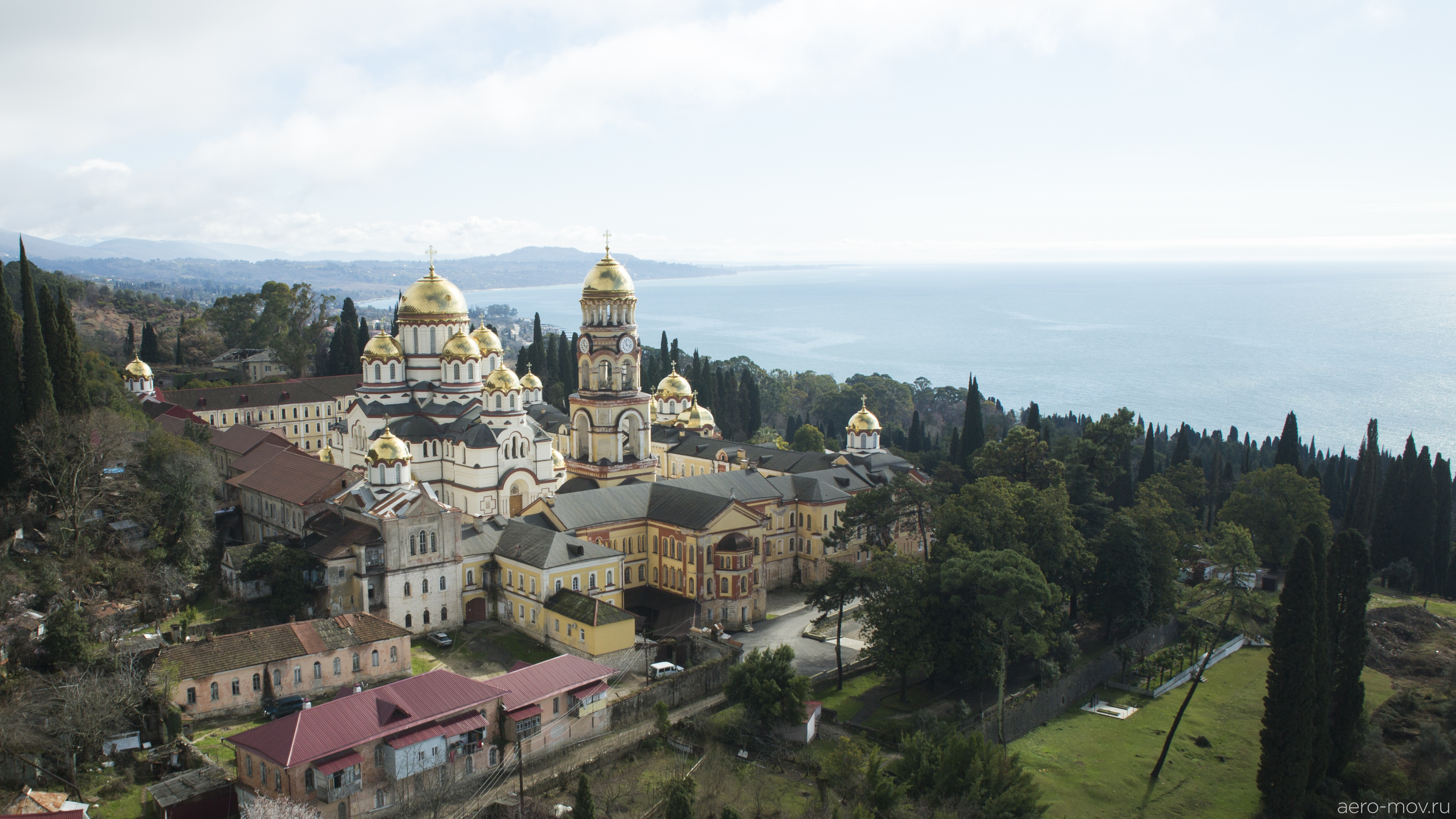

== Sources ==
- Cultural Heritage in Abkhazia, Tbilisi, 2015
