= Sukhumi Lighthouse =

Coordinates: 42°58′53″N 40°58′18″E

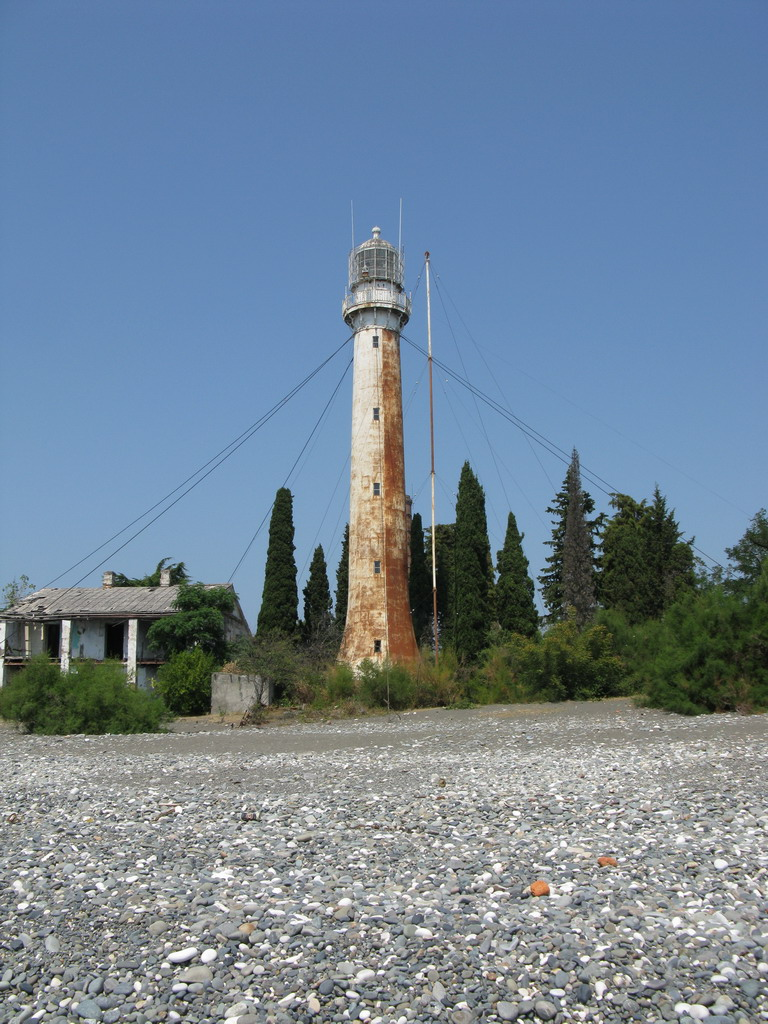

The Sukhumi Lighthouse is a lighthouse located in Sukhumi, Abkhazia (de jure a part of Georgia). The lighthouse was brought from Paris in 1861.
