= Mikhail Bgazhba =

Abkhaz-Soviet politician (1915–1993)

- Михаил Бгажба (Russian)

First Secretary of the Communist Party of Abkhazia
- In office February 1958 – September 1965
- Preceded by: Otar Gotsiridze
- Succeeded by: Valerian Kobakhia

Personal details
- Born: 1915
- Died: 1993 (aged 77–78)
- Party: Communist Party of the Soviet Union

Mikhail Temurovich Bgazhba (Russian: Михаил Тимурович Бгажба; Georgian: მიხეილ ბღაჟბა; 1915 – 1993) was an Abkhaz Communist leader who served as the First Secretary of the Communist Party of Abkhazia from February 1958 until September 1965.
