= Timothy K. Blauvelt =

Historian of the Soviet Union based in Tbilisi

Timothy K. Blauvelt is Research Professor of Russia and Eurasia Studies at the US Army War College. He previously was a Professor of Soviet and post-Soviet Studies at Ilia State University in Tbilisi, Georgia and had been teaching at this university since 2011. He joined the US Army War College in the spring of 2026.

Blauvelt's broader focus is Russian and Soviet History, especially in the Caucasus, Nationalism and Language, as well as respective policies. His publications have covered patronage networks, power intrigues and also the dynamics of perpetuation in the Soviet regime, especially in Abkhazia, Georgia, and in the broader Caucasus region. One of his particular specializations is archival study of materials related to the perpetrators of the Soviet terror. He is the author of multiple publications, including several edited volumes, including on Nestor Lakoba.

Blauvelt has been the convener of the Works-in-Progress series of academic seminars in Tbilisi, Georgia since 2009. He served as the Regional Director for the South Caucasus for American Councils for many years. Blauvelt has also been active as a jazz pianist, with a number of compositions available online.

He holds a PhD from the State University of New York at Buffalo (2001).

== Selected publications ==
- Author: Clientelism and Nationality in an Early Soviet Fiefdom: The Trials of Nestor Lakoba. Routledge (2022).
- Editor (with Jeremy Smith): Georgia after Stalin: Nationalism and Soviet Power, Routledge, (2016).
- Editor (with Adrian Brisku): The Transcaucasian Democratic Federative Republic of 1918, Routledge, (2021).
- "Abkhazia: Patronage and Power in the Stalin Era", Nationalities Papers, Vol. 25, No. 2, May 2007.
- "Endurance of the Soviet Imperial Tongue: The Russian Language in Contemporary Georgia", Central Asian Survey, March 2013.
- "Deciphering the Stalinist Perpetrators: The Case of NKVD Investigators Khazan, Savitskii and Krimian", with Davit Jishkariani, in Michael David-Fox, ed. The Secret Police and the Soviet System, University of Pittsburgh Press, 2023.
- "'From words to action!': Nationality policy in Soviet Abkhazia (1921–38)", in Stephen F. Jones, ed. The Making of Modern Georgia, 1918–2012: The first Georgian Republic and its successors, Routledge, 2012.
- "March of the chekists: Beria's secret police patronage network and Soviet crypto-politics", Communist and Post-Communist Studies, Vol. 44 (2011).
- "Resistance and Accommodation in the Stalinist Periphery: A Peasant Uprising in Abkhazia", Ab Imperio, Vol. 3, 2012.
- "The Establishment of Soviet Power in Abkhazia: Ethnicity, Contestation and Clientalism in the Revolutionary Periphery", Revolutionary Russia, Vol. 27, No. 1, 2014.
- "The 'Mingrelian Question': Institutional Resources and the Limits of Soviet Nationality Policy", Europe – Asia Studies, Vol. 66, No. 6 (August, 2014).
