= Sukhumi Botanical Garden =

Coordinates: 43.0059°N 41.0216°E

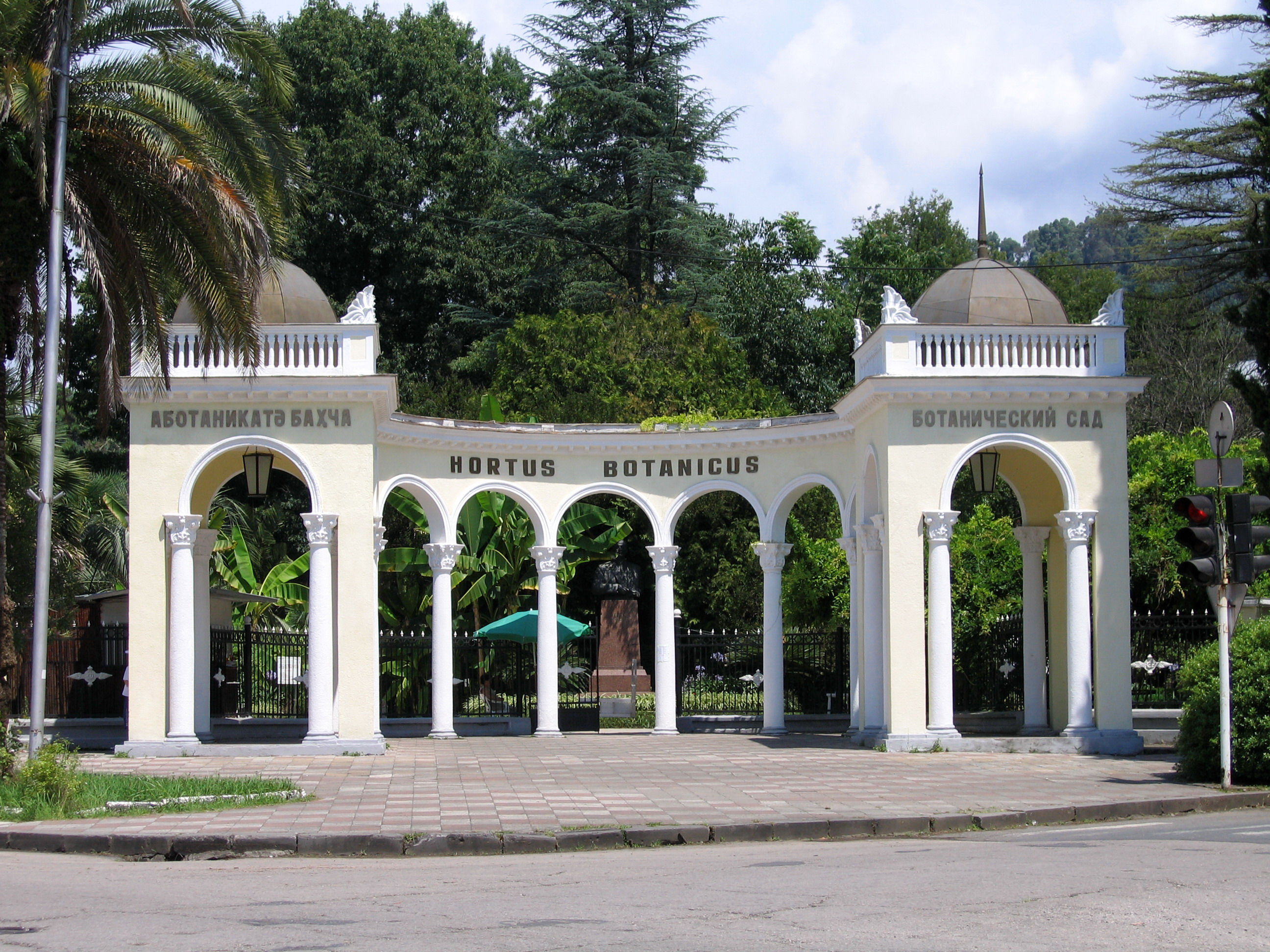
Entrance of the botanical garden

The Sukhumi Botanical Garden is one of the oldest botanical gardens in the Caucasus.

== History ==
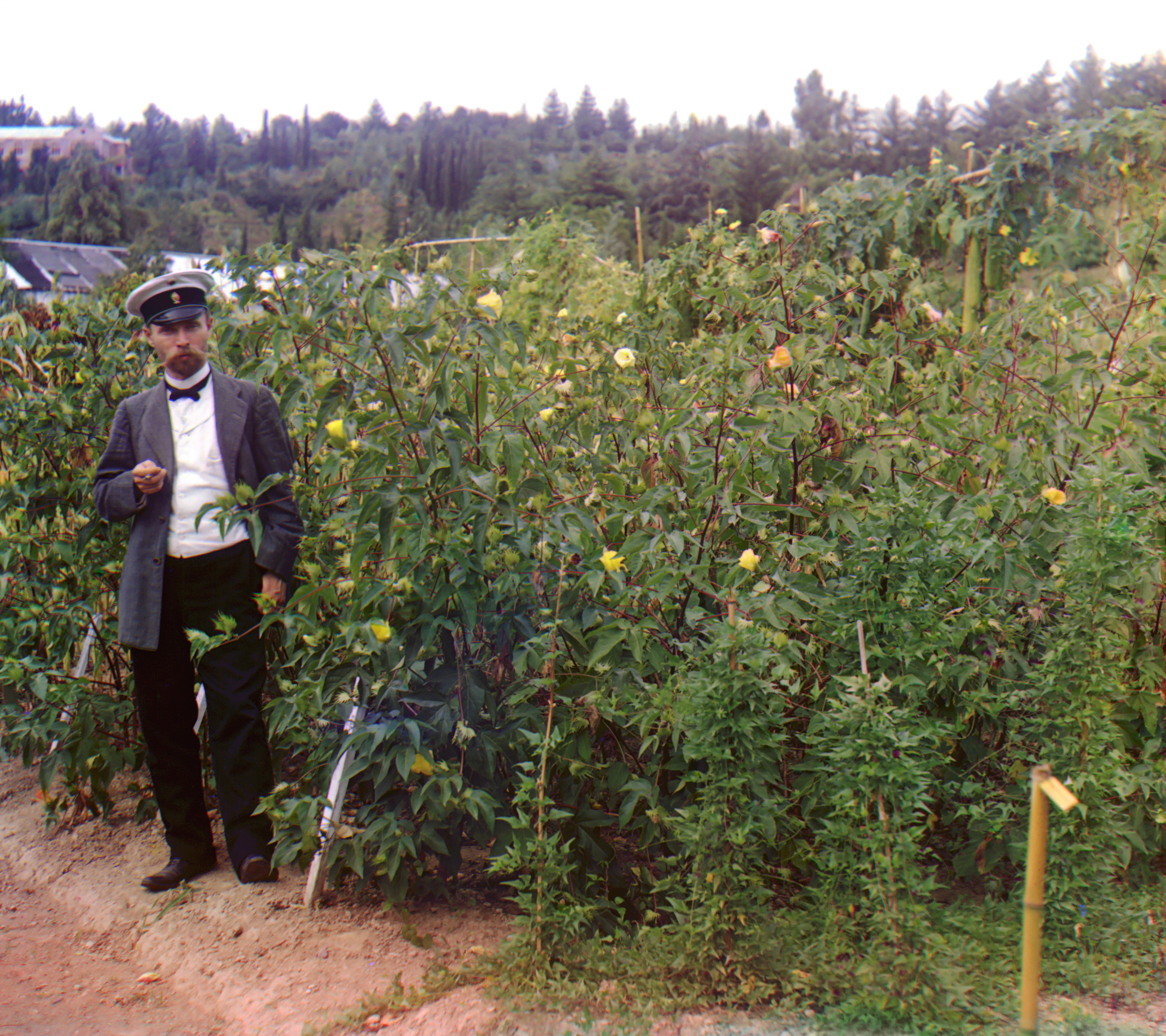
Cotton field in Sukhumi Botanical Garden, photo circa 1912

It was founded in 1840 as Sukhum-Kale Military-Botanical Garden by the head of the Russian Black Sea fortification line Nikolay Raevsky with the purpose of the introduction of new plants in the region (particularly tea and citrus fruits). It was ravaged by Turkish forces during Crimean War in 1853–55 and 1877–78 in the course of the Russo-Turkish wars. The garden was transferred to civil authorities in 1889 and the restoration of the plantings was begun in 1894.

It continued to develop during the Soviet rule and it was finally transformed into the research institute of botany of the Academy of Sciences. More than 4,500 species were collected in the garden, including 1,200 tropical ones.

The garden suffered greatly during the Georgian-Abkhazian War between (1992–1993).
