= List of dams and reservoirs =

The following is a list of reservoirs and dams, arranged by continent and country.

== Africa ==
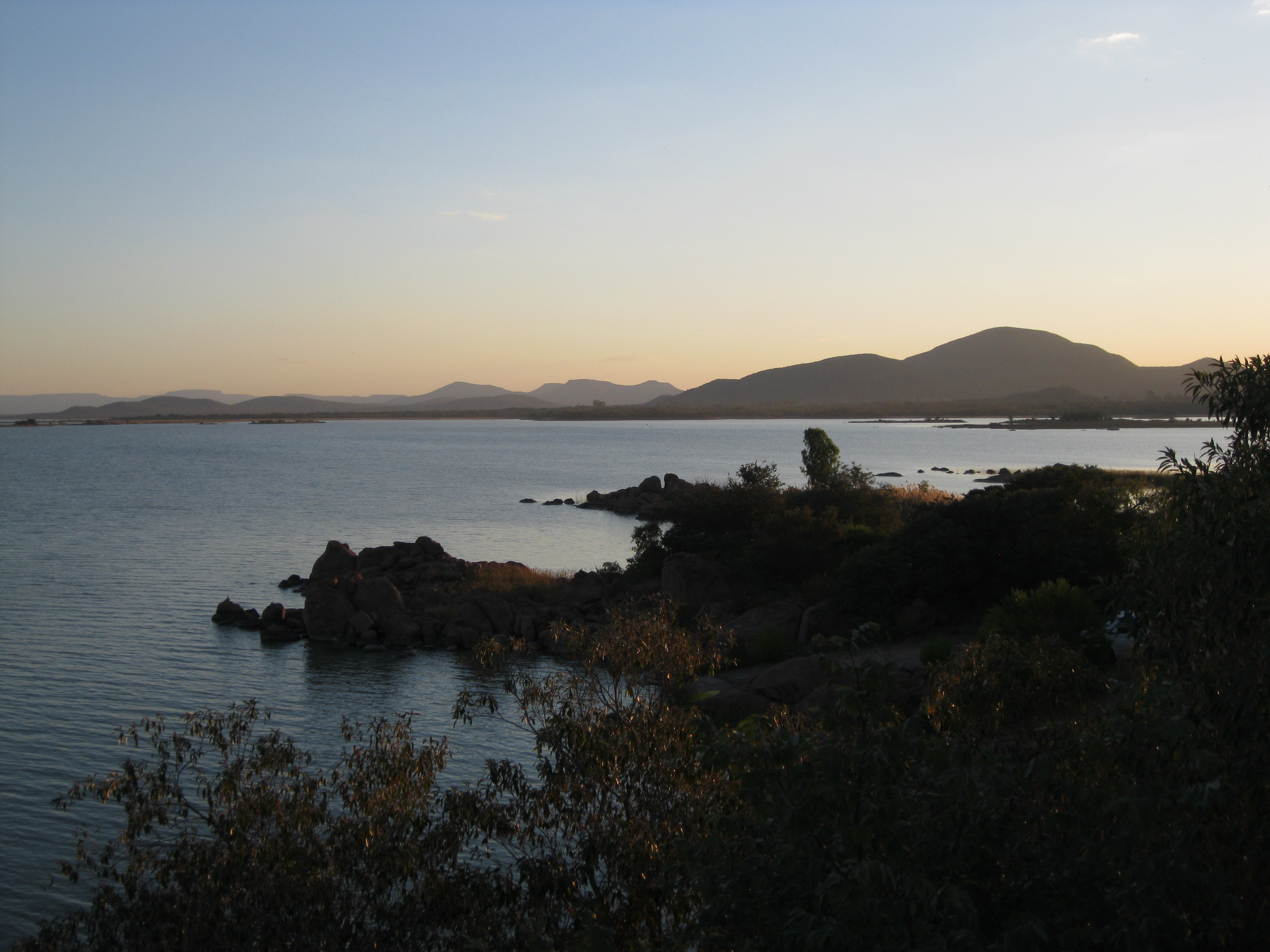
Gaborone Dam in Botswana

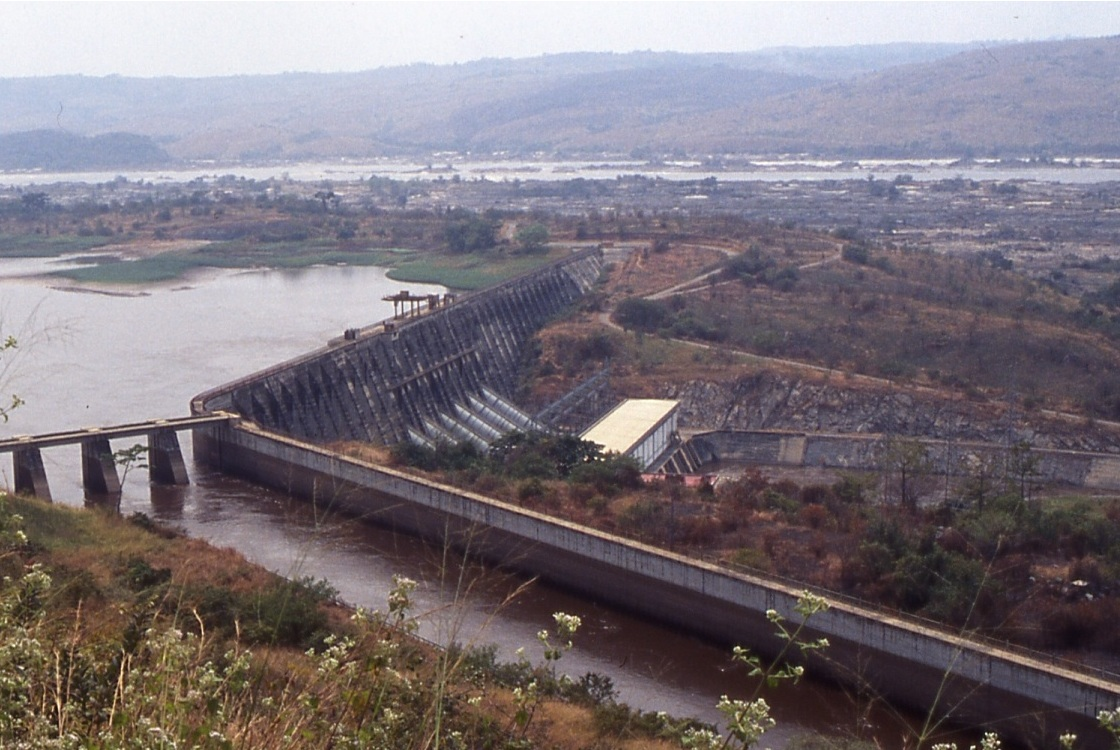
Inga Dam in DR Congo

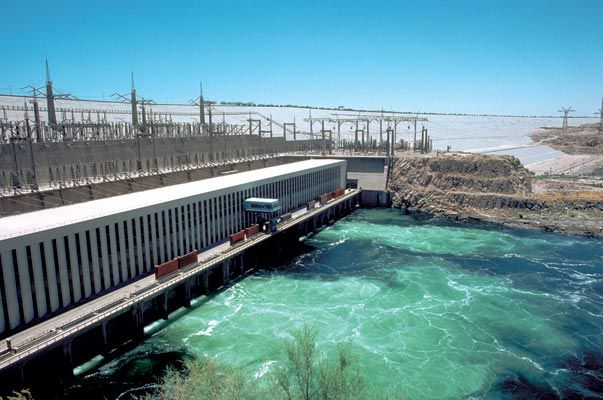
Aswan Dam in Egypt

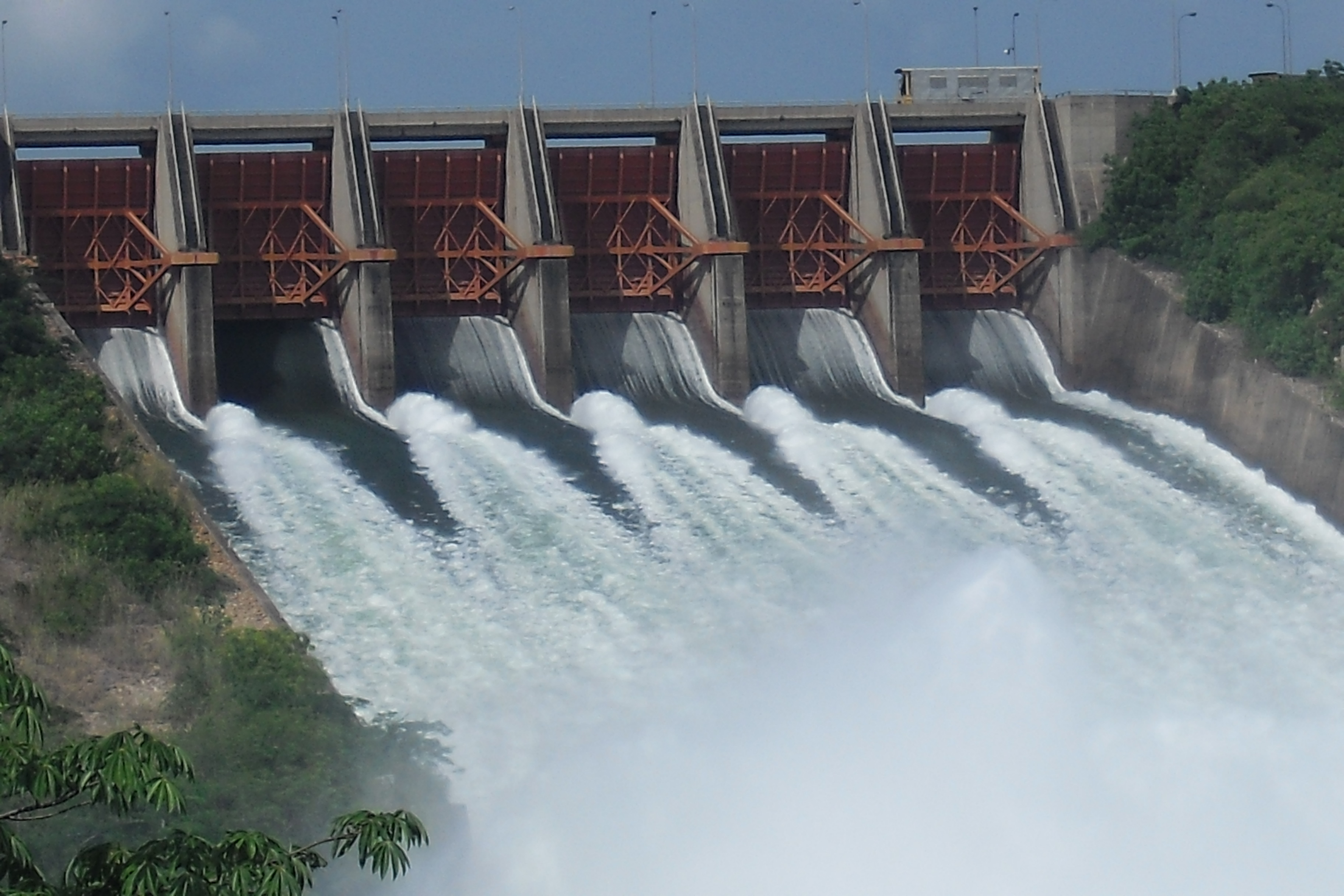
Akosombo Dam in Ghana

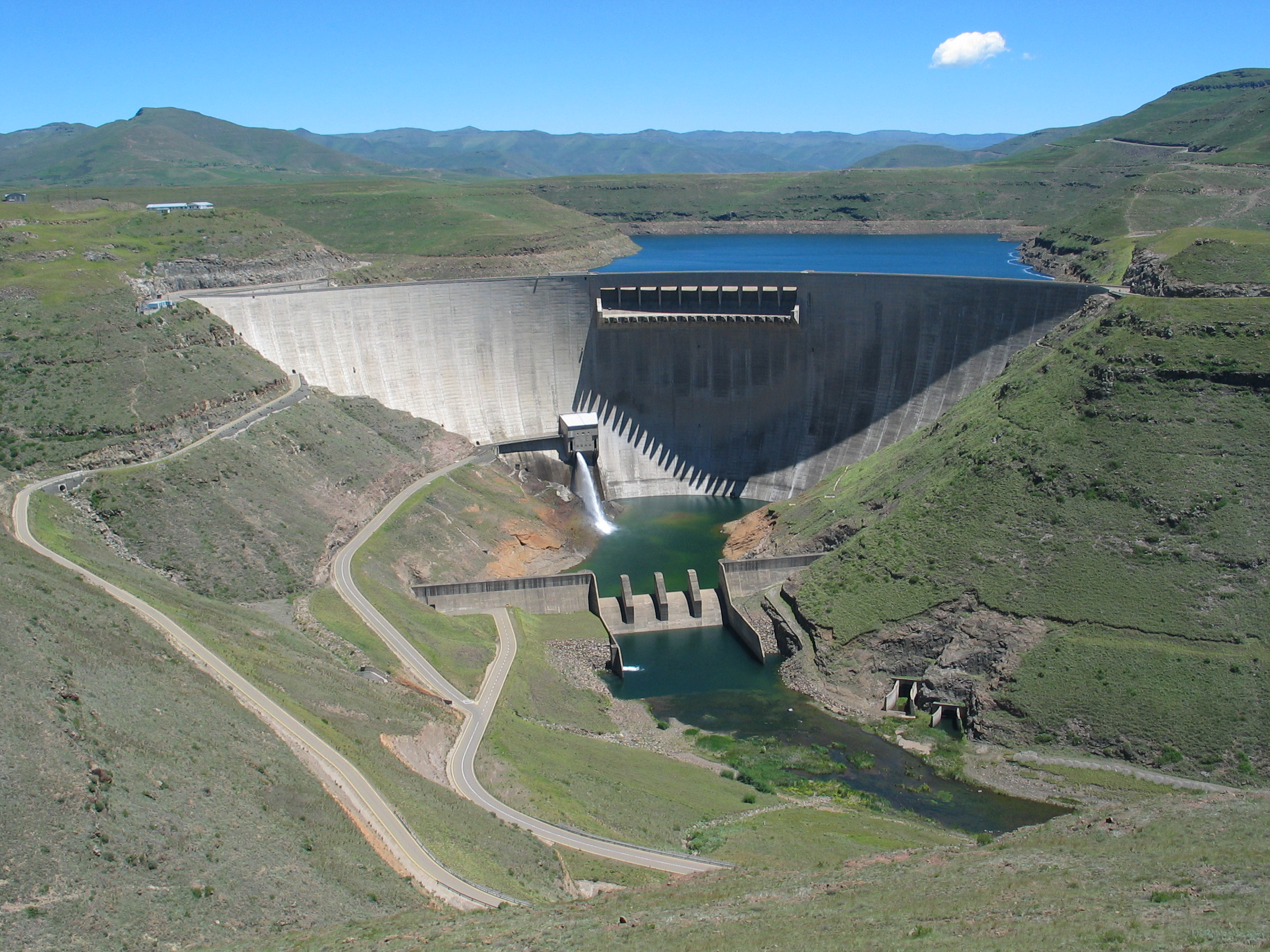
Katse Dam in Lesotho

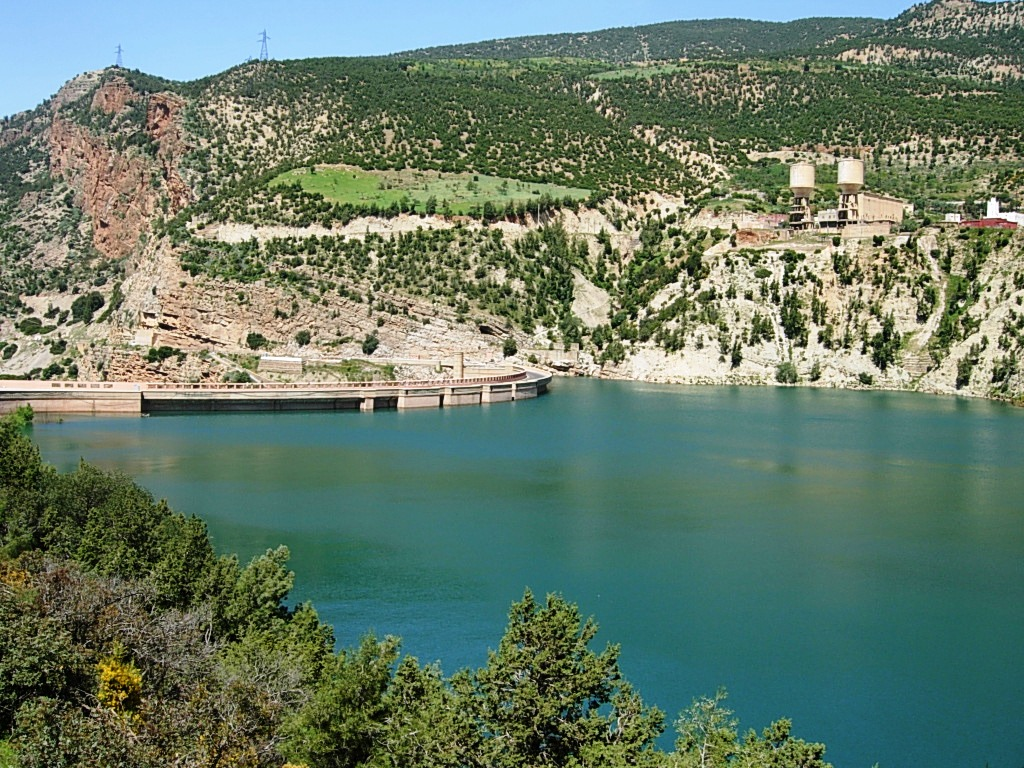
Bin el Ouidane Dam in Morocco

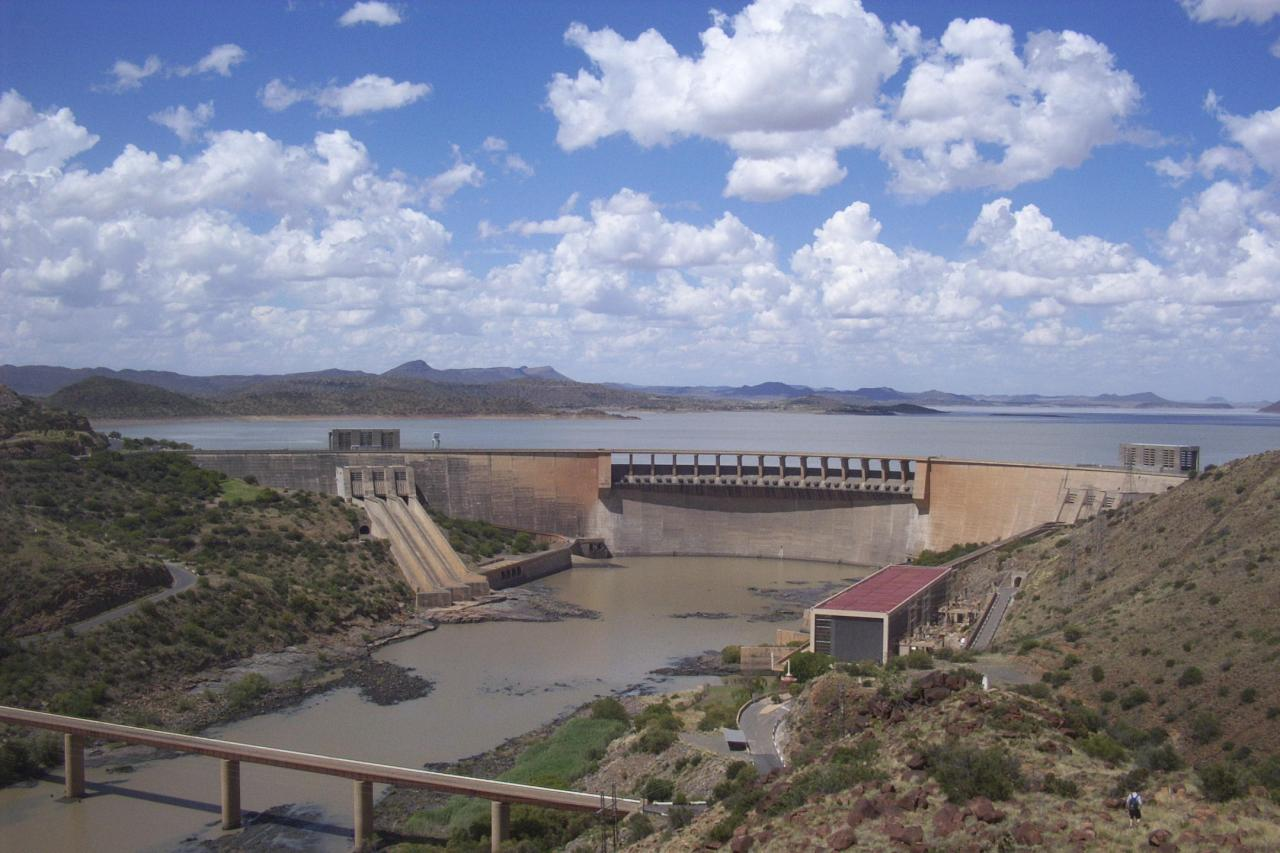
Gariep Dam in South Africa

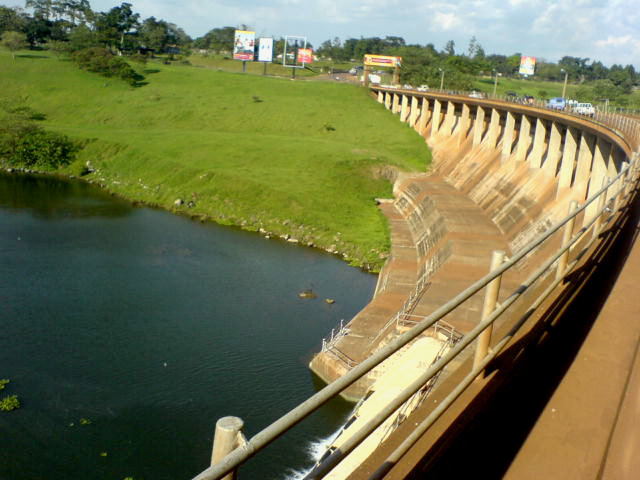
Owen Falls Dam in Uganda

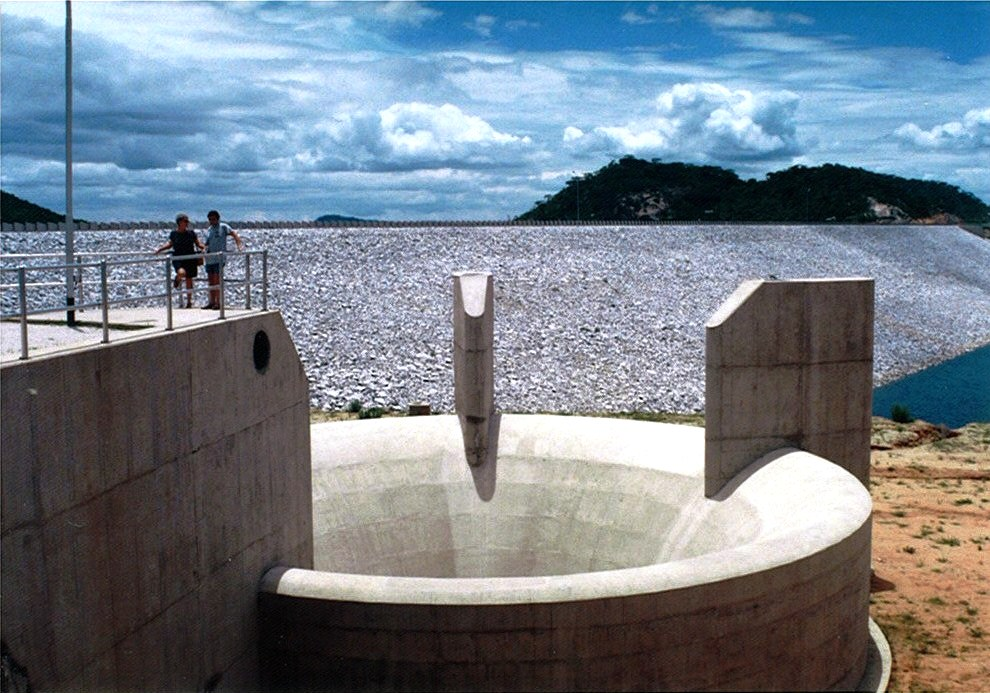
Osborne Dam in Zimbabwe

=== Algeria ===
1. Djorf Torba Dam
2. Keddara Dam
3. Koudiat Acerdoune Dam
4. Meraldene Dam
5. boughrara Dam
6. Beni Bahdel Dam
7. Mafrouch Dam
8. Sikak Dam
9. Sidi Abdelli Dam
10. Ain Tolba Dam
11. Sarno Dam
12. Ouizert Dam
13. Bou Hanifia Dam
14. Oued Mina Dam
15. Ain Ferrah Dam
16. Al Dahmouni Dam
17. Colonel Bougara Dam
18. Bakhadda Dam
19. Maghaila Dam
20. Deurdeur Dam
21. Ghrib Dam
22. Harraza Dam
23. Ouled Melouk Zedin Dam
24. Sidi Mhamed Ben Taiba Dam
25. Bni Boutab Dam
26. Sidi Yacoub Dam
27. Gargar Dam
28. Kerrada Dam
29. Oued Kramis Dam
30. Boukerdine Dam
31. Bouroumi Dam
32. Ladrat Dam
33. Oued Isser's Dam
34. Hamiz Dam
35. Oued Fodda Dam

=== Angola ===
1. Calueque Dam
2. Cambambe Dam
3. Capanda Dam
4. Gove Dam
5. Lauca Dam
6. Lomaum Dam
7. Ruacana Dam

=== Benin ===
1. Dieguoro Dam
2. Ilauko Dam

=== Burkina faso ===
1. Bagre Dam
2. Kompienga Dam

=== Cameroon ===
1. Edea Dam
2. Lagdo Dam
3. Lom Pangar Dam
4. Maga Dam
5. Song Loulou Dam

=== Cape Verde ===
1. Poilão Dam

=== Democratic Republic of Congo ===
1. Boyoma fall
2. Great Inga Dam
3. Inga Dam 1, 2, 3, 4
4. Katende Dam
5. Lubilash fall
6. Nzilo Dam
7. Ruzizi Dam 1
8. Ruzizi Dam 2
9. Ruzizi Dam 3
10. Ruzizi Dam 4
11. Tshala Dam
12. Tshopo dam
13. Zongo Dam 1, 2

=== Egypt ===
1. Aswan Dam and Lake Nasser
2. Aswan Low Dam

=== Equatorial Guinea ===
1. Djibloho Dam

=== Eritrea ===
1. Mai Nefhi
2. Toker Dam

=== Ethiopia ===
1. Beles
2. Fincha
3. Gilgel Gibe I Dam
4. Gilgel Gibe III Dam
5. Grand Ethiopian Renaissance Dam
6. Kessem Dam
7. Koka
8. Tekezé Dam
9. Tendaho Dam

=== Gabon ===
1. Bongolo Dam
2. Grand Poubara Dam

=== Ghana ===
1. Akosombo Dam - Lake Volta
2. Barekese Dam
3. Bosumtwi Dam
4. Bui Dam
5. Kpong Dam
6. Mampong Dam
7. Owabi Dam
8. Tono Dam
9. Weija Dam

=== Guinea ===
1. Amaria Dam
2. Banieya Dam
3. Garafiri Dam
4. Kale Dam

=== Ivory Coast ===
1. Buyo Dam
2. Kossou Dam
3. Taabo Dam

=== Kenya ===
Masinga dam-R Tana

=== Lesotho ===
1. Katse Dam
2. Mohale Dam
3. Metolong Dam
4. Muela Dam

=== Libya ===
1. Wadi Ghan Dam
2. Wadi Kaam Dam
3. Wadi Lebda Dam
4. Wadi Mejenin Dam
5. Wadi Qattara Dam
6. Wadi Wishka Dam

=== Madagascar ===
1. Antelomita Dam
2. Ambilivily Dam
3. Amboromalandy Dam
4. Andekaleka Dam
5. Andilamena B2 Dam
6. Andilamena B3 Dam
7. Andranobe Dam
8. Antanifotsy Dam
9. Antelomita Dam
10. Mandraka Dam
11. Mantasoa Dam
12. Morafeno Dam
13. Sahamaloto Dam
14. Tsiazompaniry Dam

=== Malawi ===
1. Chitete Dam
2. Kamuzu Dam I Dam
3. Kamuzu Dam II Dam
4. Kapichira Dam
5. Lunyangwa Dam
6. Mpira-Balaka Dam
7. Mudi Dam
8. Mulunguzi Dam
9. Nankhuna Dam
10. Nkhula B Dam

=== Mali ===
1. Félou Falls Weir
2. Gouina Weir
3. Manantali Dam
4. Sélingué Dam

=== Mauritania ===
1. Diama Dam
2. Foum Gleita Dam

=== Mauritius ===
1. Eau Bleue Reservoir
2. La Ferme Reservoir
3. La Nicolière Reservoir
4. Mare aux Vacoas
5. Mare Longue Reservoir
6. Midlands Dam
7. Piton du Milieu Reservoir
8. Tamarind Falls Reservoir
9. Valetta Reservoir

=== Morocco ===
1. Aït Ouarda Dam
2. Al Massira Dam
3. Al Wahda Dam
4. Allal al Fassi Dam
5. Bin el Ouidane Dam
6. Daourat Dam
7. Hassan I Dam
8. Hassan II Dam
9. Idriss I Dam
10. Imfout Dam
11. Mohamed V Dam
12. Tanafnit El Borj Dam
13. Youssef Ibn Tachfin Dam

=== Mozambique ===
1. Cahora Bassa Dam
2. Massingir Dam
3. Mphanda Nkuwa Dam

=== Namibia ===
1. Avis Dam
2. Bondels Dam
3. Friedenau Dam
4. Hardap Dam
5. Naute Dam
6. Oanob Dam
7. Olushandja Dam
8. Omatako Dam
9. Omatjenne Dam
10. Swakoppoort Dam
11. Von Bach Dam
12. Neckartal Dam

=== Niger ===
1. Kandadji Dam

=== Nigeria ===
1. Kainji Dam
2. Goranyo Dam

=== Republic of the Congo ===
1. Imboulou Dam

=== Rwanda ===
1. Nyabarongo Dam
2. Rusumo Dam

=== Senegal ===
1. Diama Dam

=== Sierra Leone ===
1. Bumbuna Dam
2. Guma Dam

=== Swaziland ===
1. Maguga Dam

=== Tanzania ===
1. Hombolo Dam
2. Kidatu Dam
3. Kihansi Dam
4. Mtera Dam
5. Nyumba ya Mungu Dam
6. Julius Nyerere Hydro Power Plant (JNPP)

=== Togo ===
1. Nangbeto Dam

=== Tunisia ===
1. Kasserine Dam
2. Sidi el Barrak Dam
3. Sidi Salem Dam

=== Uganda ===
1. Adekokwok Hydroelectric Power Station
2. Ayago Power Station
3. Bujagali Power Station
4. Isimba Power Station
5. Karuma Power Station
6. Kiira Power Station
7. Nalubaale Power Station

=== Zambia ===
1. Kariba Dam

=== Zimbabwe ===
1. Bangala Dam
2. Gwenoro Dam
3. Kariba Dam
4. Lake Chivero
5. Lake Mutirikwe
6. Manjirenji Dam
7. Manyuchi Dam
8. Mutange Dam
9. Ngondoma Dam
10. Osborne Dam
11. Ruti Dam
12. Tokwe Mukorsi Dam

== Asia ==
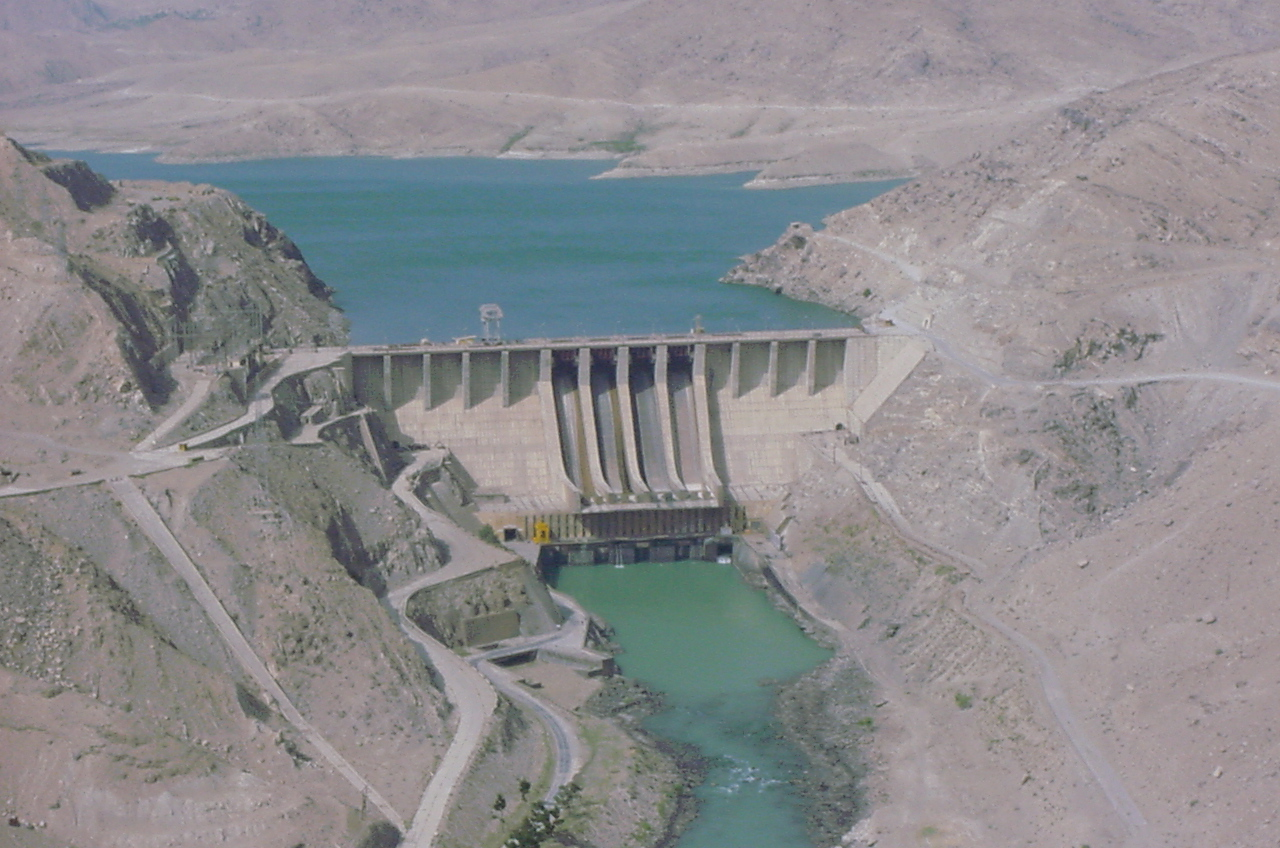
Naghlu Dam in Afghanistan

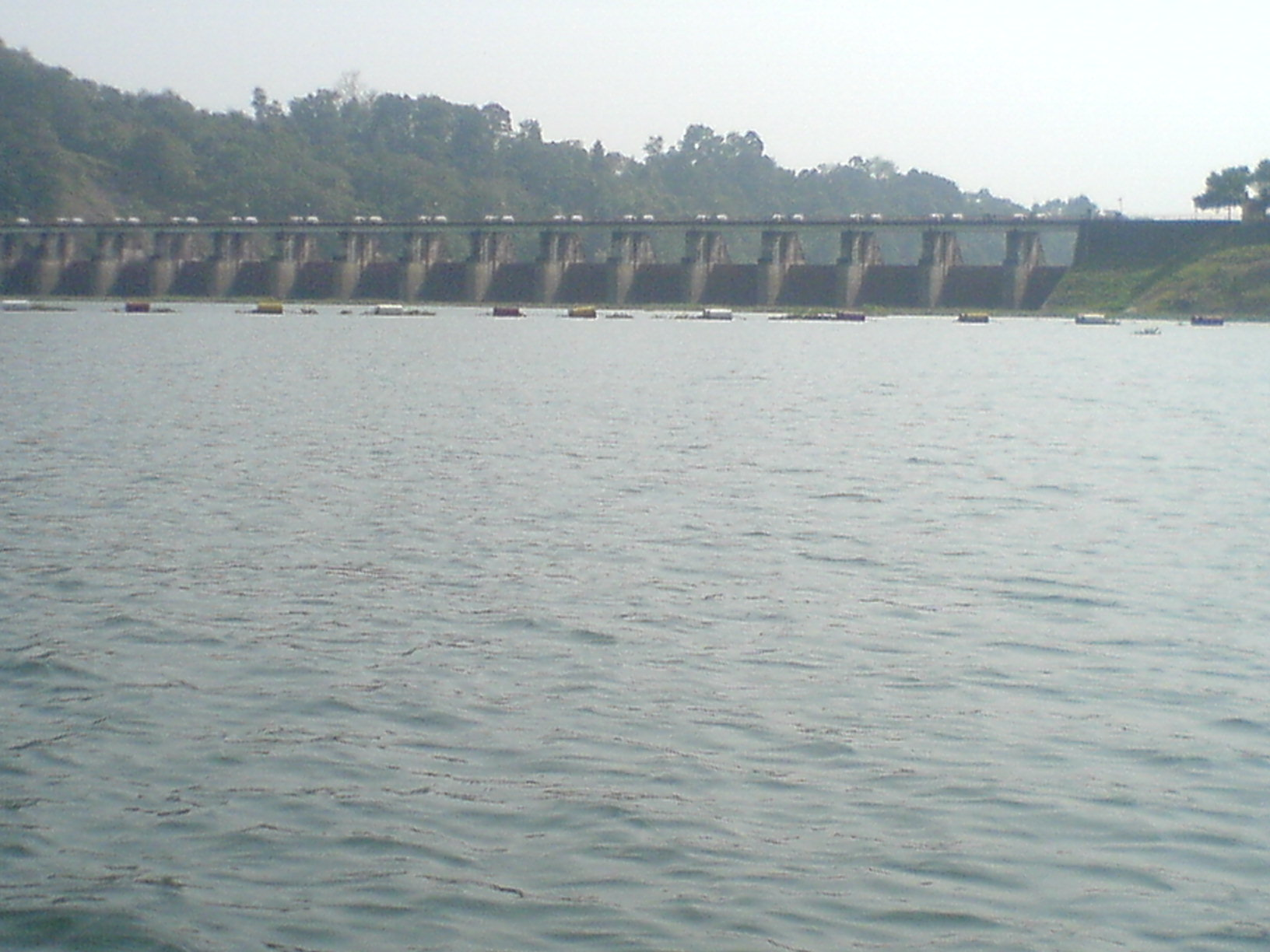
Kaptai Dam in Bangladesh

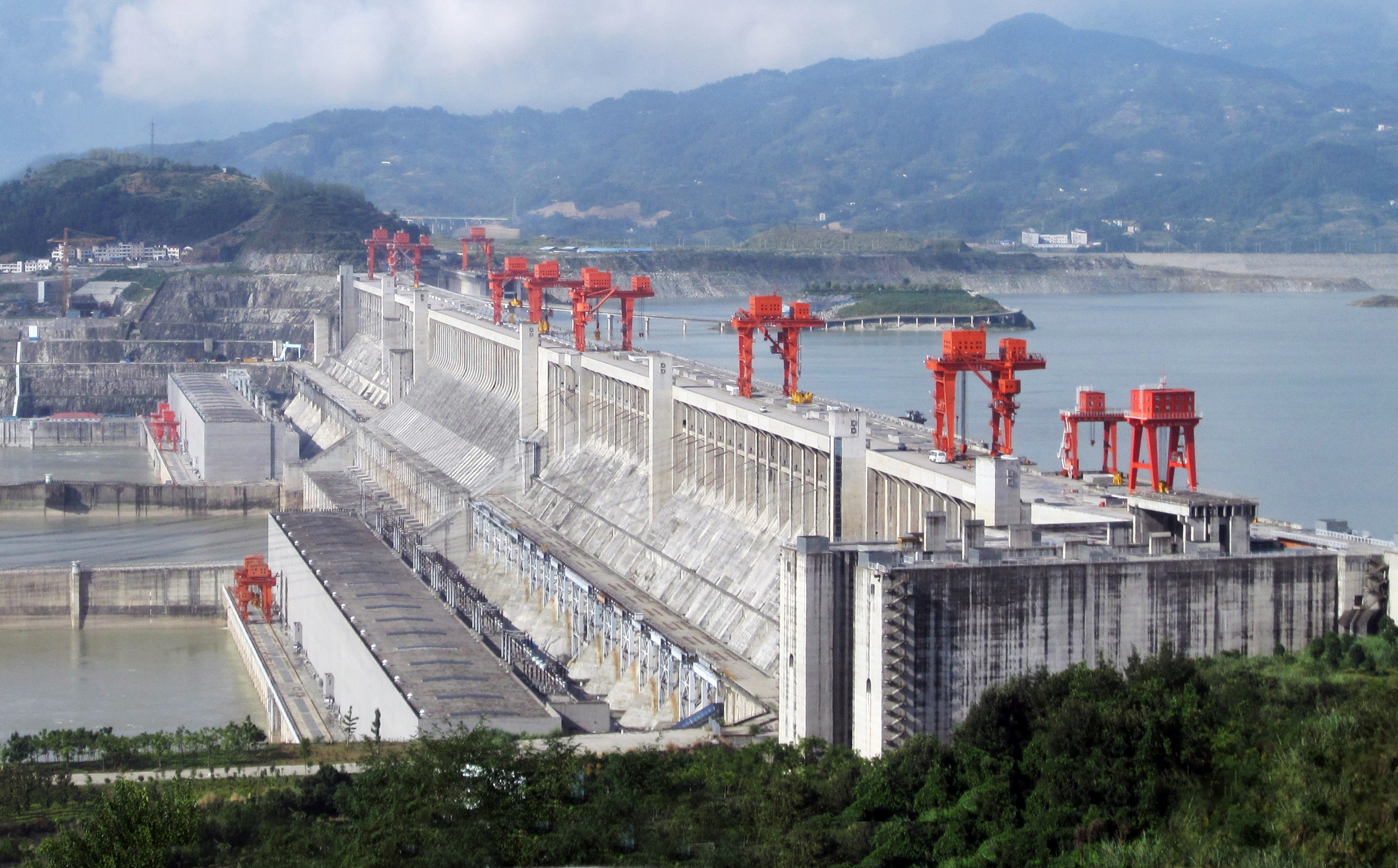
Three Gorges Dam in China

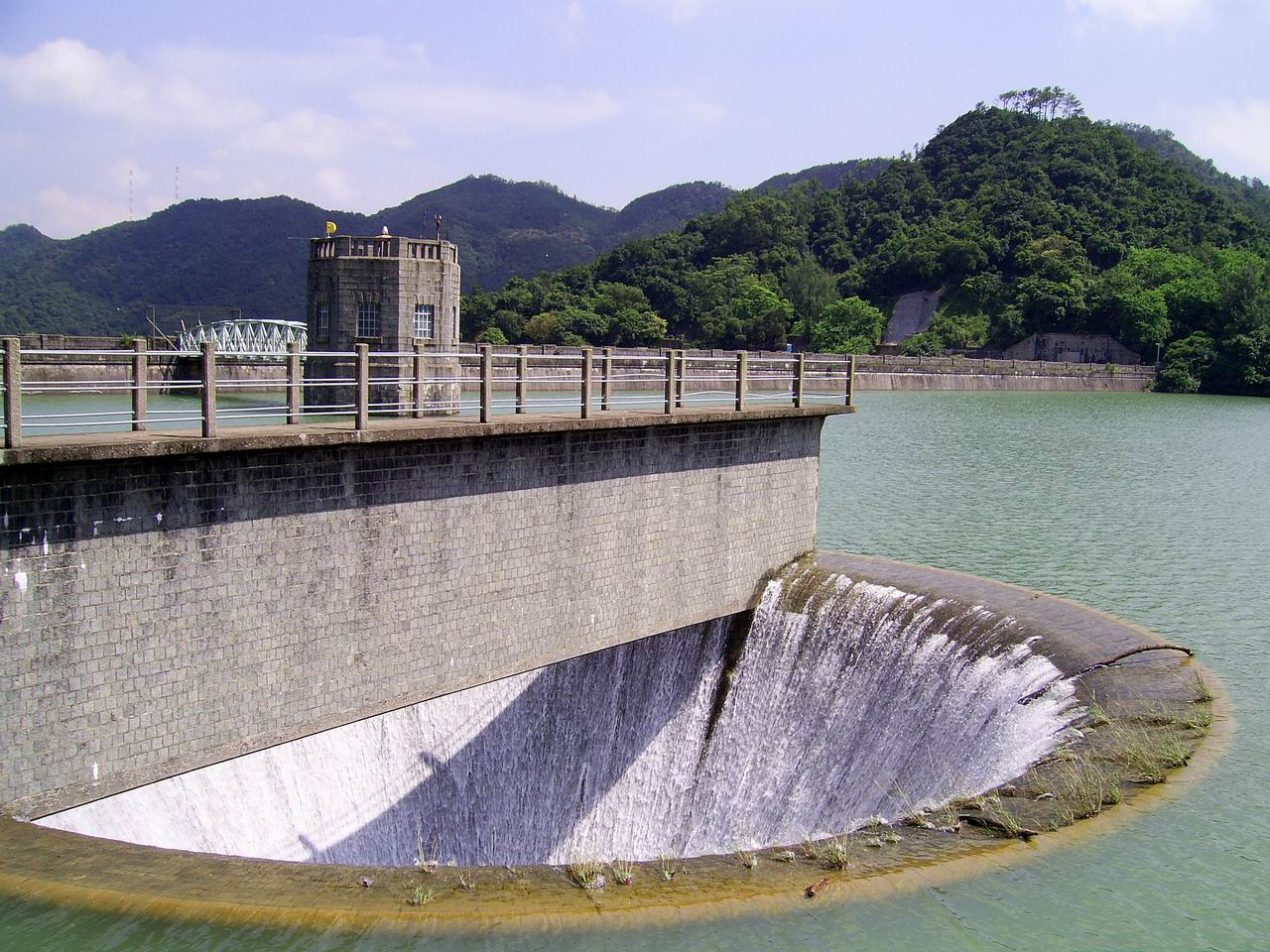
Shing Mun Dam in Hong Kong

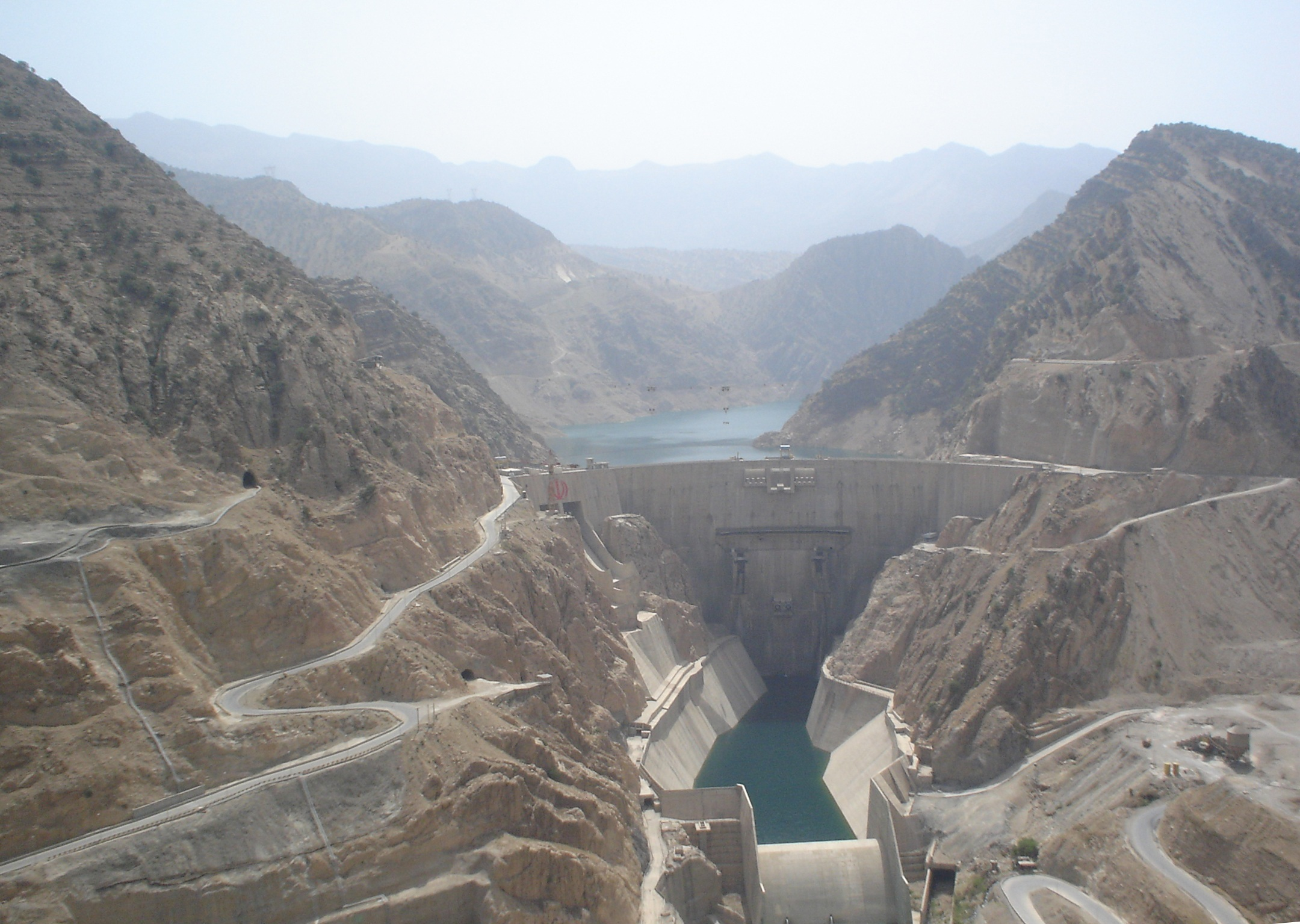
Karun-3 Dam in Iran

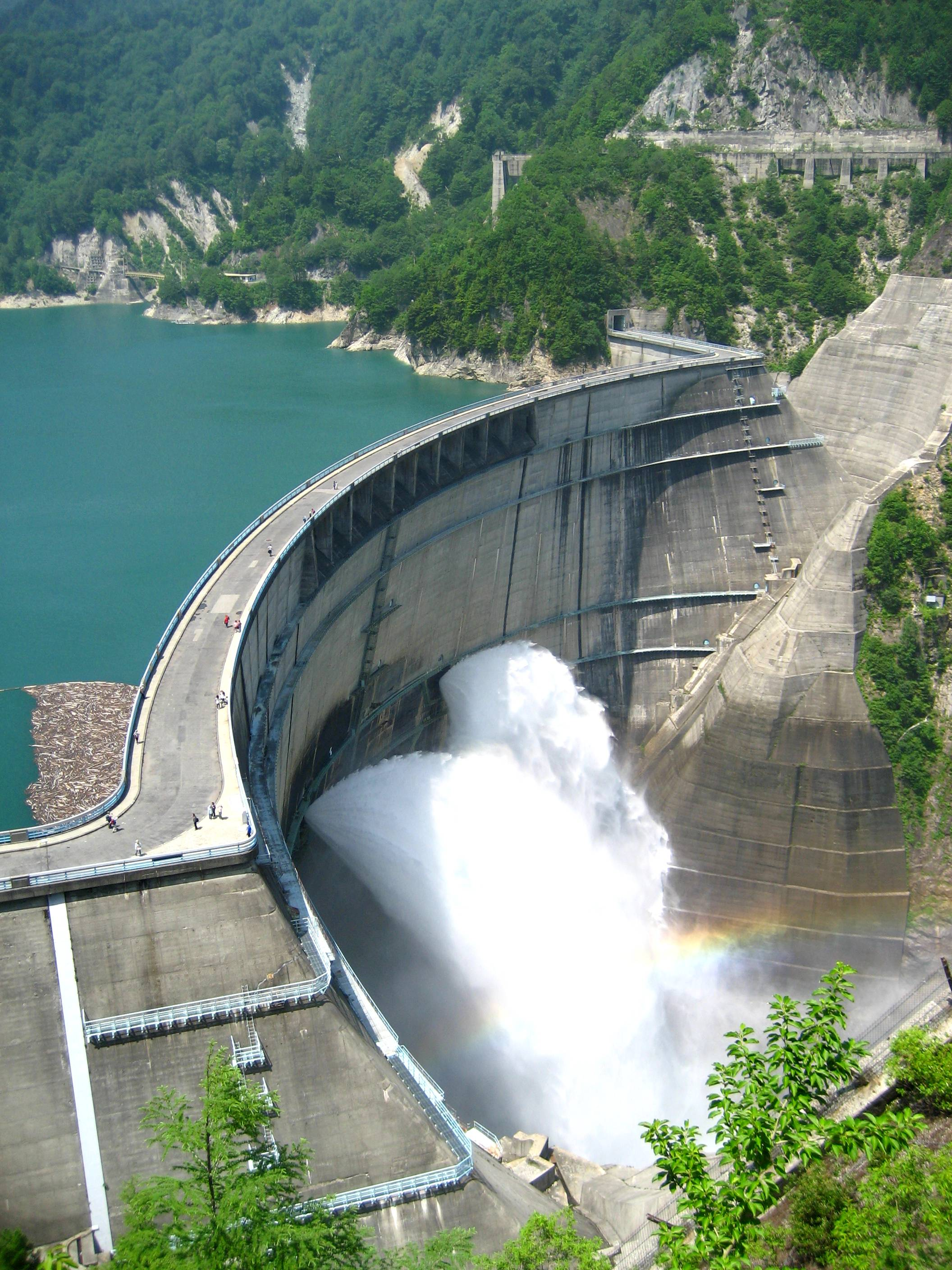
Kurobe Dam in Japan

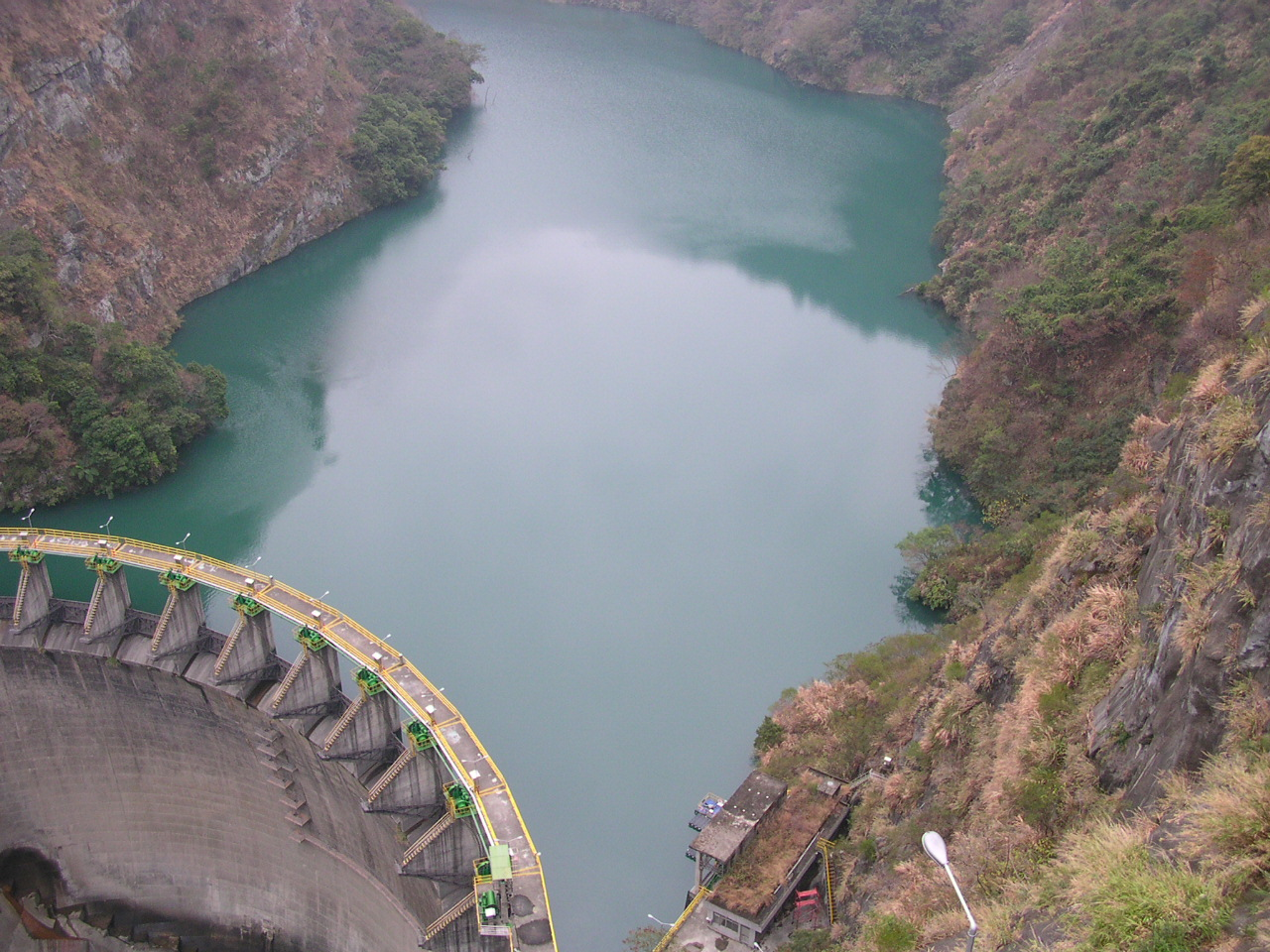
Junghua Dam in Taiwan

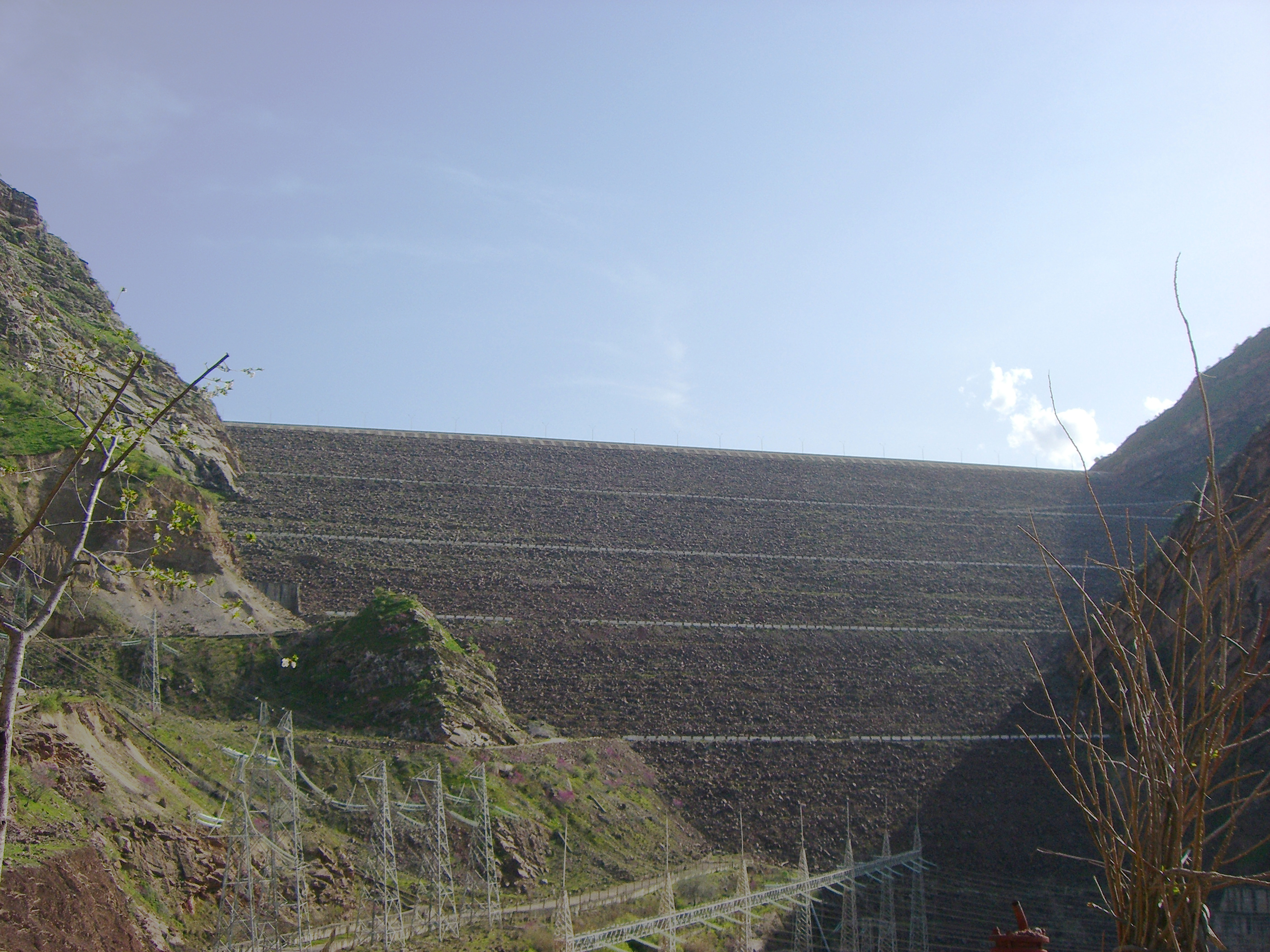
Nurek Dam in Tajikistan

=== Central ===
==== Kazakhstan ====
1. Bogen Dam
2. Bukhtarma Dam
3. Kapshagay Dam
4. Kyzyl-Agash Dam
5. Kyzylbulak Dam
6. Kyzylkungei Dam
7. Medeu Dam
8. Moinak Dam
9. Sergeyev Dam
10. Shardara Dam
11. Shulbinsk Dam
12. Tunkuruz Dam
13. Ust-Kamenogorsk Dam

==== Kyrgyzstan ====
1. At-Bashy Dam
2. Kambar-Ata-2 Dam
3. Kürpsay Dam
4. Shamaldy-Say Dam
5. Tash-Kömür Dam
6. Toktogul Dam
7. Üch-Korgon Dam

==== Tajikistan ====
1. Baipaza Dam
2. Farkhad Dam
3. Golovnaya Dam
4. Kayrakkum Dam - Kayrakkum Reservoir
5. Nurek Dam
6. Rogun Dam
7. Sangtuda 1 Dam
8. Sangtuda 2 Dam
9. Usoi Dam

==== Turkmenistan ====
1. Iran–Turkmenistan Friendship Dam
2. Tuyamuyun Hydro Complex

==== Uzbekistan ====
1. Abdulkhan Bandi Dam
2. Andijan Dam
3. Farkhad Dam
4. Tuyamuyun Hydro Complex
5. Kurgantepa Reservoir

=== Eastern ===
==== Japan ====
1. Kurobe Dam, Toyama, tallest in the country
2. Tokuyama Dam, largest dam in the country and creates the largest reservoir

==== North Korea ====
1. Huichon Dam
2. Hwanggang Dam
3. Imnam Dam
4. Nampo Dam
5. Songwon Dam
6. Sup'ung Dam
7. Taepyongman Dam
8. Unbong Dam
9. Wiwon Dam
10. Yongnim Dam

==== South Korea ====
1. Andong Dam
2. Chungju Dam
3. Daecheong Dam
4. Gongsan Dam
5. Hantangang Dam
6. Hwacheon Dam
7. Imha Dam
8. Inje Dam
9. Peace Dam
10. Soyang Dam
11. Uiam Dam
12. Yangsang (Sangbu) Dam

=== Southeast ===
==== Brunei ====
1. Benutan Dam
2. Imang Dam
3. Kagu Dam
4. Mengkubau Dam
5. Tasek Dam
6. Ulu Tutong Dam

==== Cambodia ====
1. Cheay Areng Dam
2. Lower Se San 2 Dam
3. Lower Sre Pok 2 Dam
4. O Chum 2 Hydropower Dam
5. Sambor Dam
6. Stung Battambang 1 Dam
7. Stung Sen Dam
8. Stung Treng Dam

==== East Timor ====
1. Gariuai Dams

==== Indonesia ====
1. Batujai Dam, Lombok, West Nusa Tenggara
2. Batutegi Dam, Tanggamus, Lampung
3. Bili-Bili Dam, Gowa, South Sulawesi
4. Cacaban Dam, Tegal, Central Java
5. Cirata Dam, Purwakarta, West Java
6. Gajah Mungkur Dam, Wonogiri, Central Java
7. Gondang Dam, Lamongan, East Java
8. Jatigede Dam, Sumedang, West Java
9. Jatiluhur Dam, Purwakarta, West Java
10. Kedungombo Dam, Grobogan, Central Java
11. Riam Kanan Dam, Banjar, South Kalimantan
12. Saguling Dam, Bandung, West Java
13. Sempor Dam, Kebumen, Central Java
14. Sigura-gura Dam, North Tapanuli, North Sumatera
15. Soedirman Dam, Banjarnegara, Central Java
16. Sutami Dam, Malang, East Java
17. Tilong Dam, Kupang, East Nusa Tenggara
18. Wadaslintang Dam, Kebumen, Central Java
19. Wonorejo Dam, Tulungagung, East Java

==== Malaysia ====
1. Ayer Itam Dam
2. Babagon Dam
3. Bakun Dam
4. Batang Ai Dam
5. Batu Dam
6. Bekok Dam
7. Beris Dam
8. Betotan Dam, Sandakan
9. Bukit Merah Dam
10. Chenderoh Dam
11. Kenyir Dam
12. Kinta Dam, Perak
13. Klang Gates Dam
14. Layang Dam
15. Lebam Dam
16. Linggiu Dam
17. Machap Dam
18. Mengkuang Dam
19. Murum Dam
20. Pedu Lake
21. Pergau Dam
22. Sembrong Dam
23. Semenyih Dam
24. Sultan Iskandar Dam
25. Tasik Subang Dam
26. Teluk Bahang Dam
27. Temenggor Dam
28. Ulu Jelai Dam

==== Philippines ====
1. Agus I Dam
2. Agus II Dam
3. Agus III Dam (proposed)
4. Agus IV Dam
5. Agus V Dam
6. Agus VI Dam
7. Agus VII Dam
8. Agusan Dam
9. Ambuklao Dam
10. Angat Dam
11. Aragon Dam
12. Binga Dam
13. Buhisan Dam
14. Bustos Dam
15. Caliraya Dam
16. Calumpang Diversion Dam
17. Canili-Diayo Dam
18. Casecnan Dam
19. Ipo Dam
20. Kaliwa Low Dam (proposed)
21. La Mesa Dam
22. Labasin Dam
23. Laiban Dam (proposed)
24. Lumot Dam
25. Magat Dam
26. Molino (Prinza) Dam
27. Pantabangan Dam
28. Pasa Dam
29. Pulangi Dam
30. San Roque Dam
31. Wawa Dam

==== Thailand ====
1. Bhumibol Dam
2. Chao Phraya Dam
3. Chulabhorn Dam
4. Hua Na Dam
5. Huai Kum Dam
6. Kaeng Krachan Dam
7. Kaeng Suea Ten Dam
8. Lam Phra Phloeng Dam
9. Lam Takhong Dam
10. Mae Ngat Somboon Chon Dam
11. Mae Wong Dam
12. Nam Phong Dam
13. Pa Sak Jolasid Dam
14. Pak Mun Dam
15. Rasi Salai Dam
16. Sirikit Dam
17. Sirindhorn Dam
18. Srinagarind Dam
19. Tha Thung Na Dam
20. Ubol Ratana Dam
21. Vajiralongkorn Dam

==== Vietnam ====
1. Buôn Kuốp Dam
2. Đa Nhim Dam
3. Hàm Thuận – Đa Mi Dams
4. Hòa Bình Dam
5. Lai Châu Dam
6. Na Hang Dam
7. Sơn La Dam
8. Thác Mơ Dam
9. Trị An Dam
10. Trung Sơn Dam
11. Yali Falls Dam

=== South ===
==== Bangladesh ====
1. Kaptai Dam

==== Bhutan ====
1. Tala Dam

==== Nepal ====
1. Bhote Koshi Dam
2. Chilime Dam
3. Kaligandaki A Dam
4. Koshi Barrage
5. Kulekhani Dam
6. Mai Dam
7. Sunkoshi Dam
8. Upper Karnali Dam
9. Upper Tamakoshi Dam
10. West Seti Dam

==== Pakistan ====
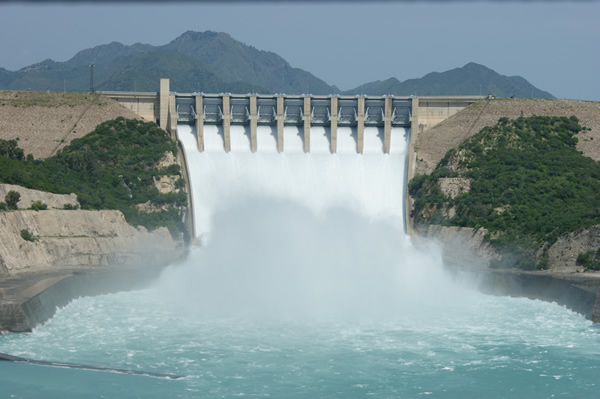
Tarbela Dam, Pakistan (the largest earth-filled dam in the world and also the largest by structural volume)

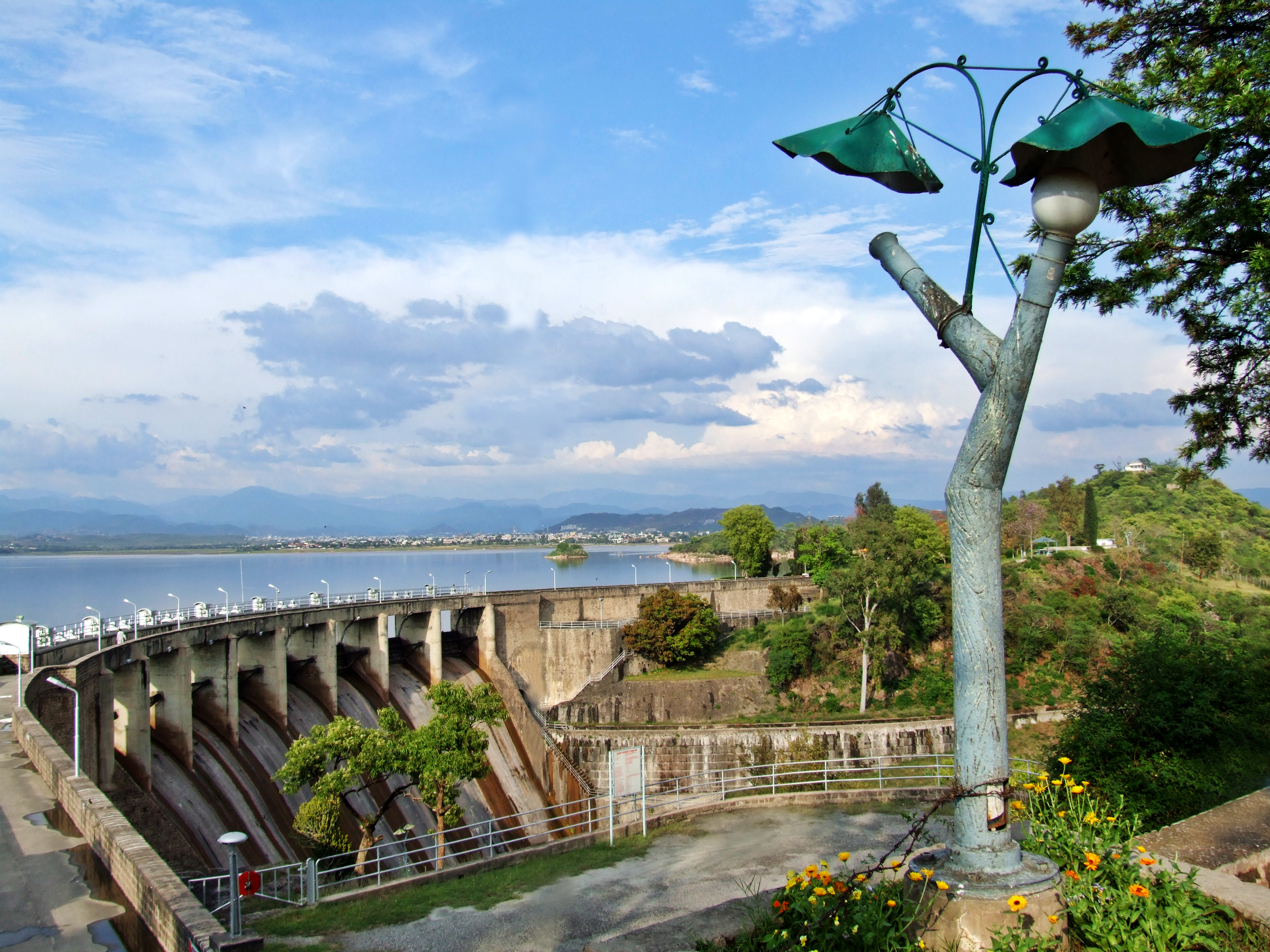
Rawal Dam, Pakistan

1. Tarbela Dam
2. Mangla Dam
3. Khanpur Dam
4. Dasu Dam
5. Sabakzai Dam
6. Mirani Dam
7. Rawal Dam
8. Gomal Zam Dam
9. Hub Dam

==== Armenia ====
1. Meghri Dam

==== Azerbaijan ====
1. Agstafachay Dam
2. Aras Dam
3. Khanbulanchay Dam
4. Khoda Afarin Dam
5. Mil Mugim Dam
6. Mingachevir Dam - Mingachevir reservoir
7. Sarsang Dam - Sarsang reservoir
8. Shamkir Dam - Shamkir reservoir
9. Shamkirchay Dam
10. Takhtakorpu Dam
11. Varvara Dam
12. Vileshchay Dam
13. Yenikend Dam - Yenikend reservoir

==== Israel ====
1. Degania Dam
2. Yeruham Dam

==== Jordan ====
1. Al-Wehda Dam
2. Jawa Dam
3. King Talal Dam
4. Mujib Dam

==== Saudi Arabia ====
1. Al Lith Dam
2. Baysh Dam
3. Fatima Dam
4. Hali Dam
5. Jizan Dam
6. King Fahad Dam
7. Murwani Dam
8. Najran Valley Dam
9. Rabigh Dam

==== Syria ====
1. Euphrates Dam
2. Halabiye Dam
3. Hassakeh East Dam
4. Hassakeh South Dam
5. Hassakeh West Dam
6. Mansoura Dam
7. Tishrin Dam

==== United Arab Emirates ====
1. Al Rafisah Dam
2. Hatta Dam
3. Wadi Shi Dam
4. Shawka Dam 25.106436°N 56.043461°E
5. Wadi Ham Dam
6. Wadi Al-Beeh Dam

==== Yemen ====
1. Marib Dam

=== Asia-Pacific ===
==== French Polynesia ====
1. Faatautia (Hita'a) Dam
2. Tahinu Dam
3. Tevaiohiro Dam
4. Titaaviri Dam
5. Vaihiria Dam
6. Vainavenave Dam
7. Vaitapaa Dam
8. Vaite Dam
9. Vaituoru Dam

==== Samoa ====
1. Afulilo Dam

== Europe ==
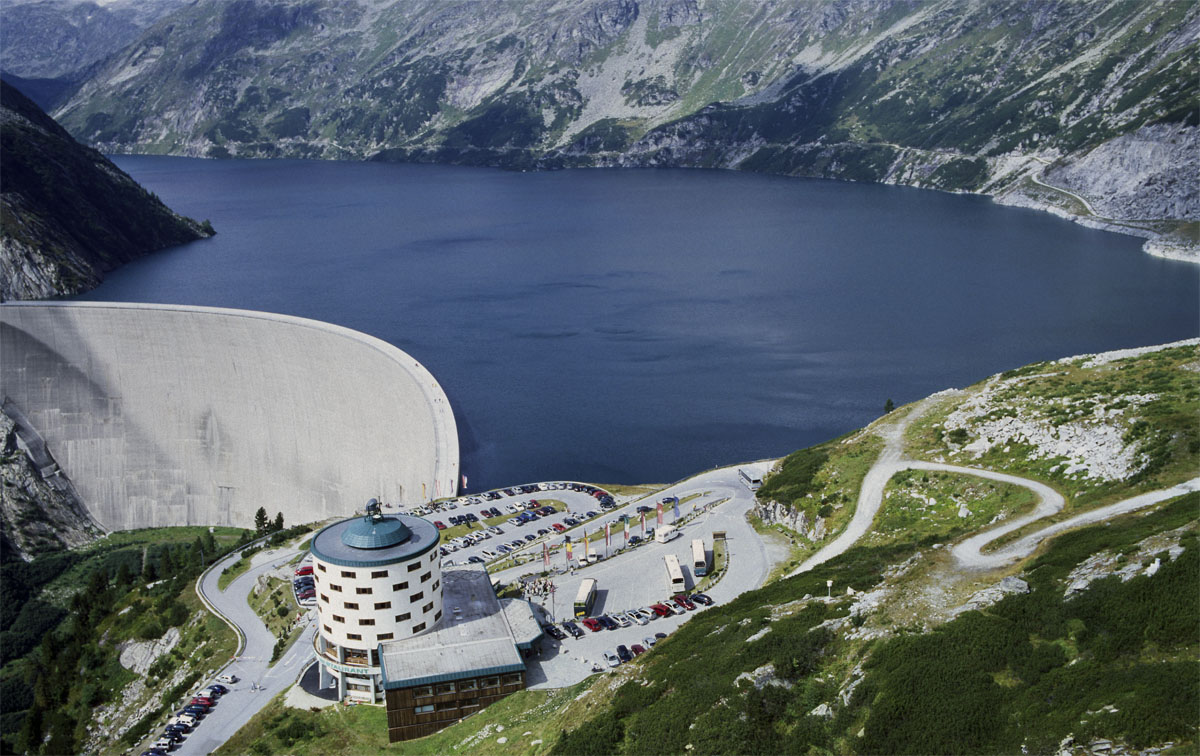
Kölnbrein Dam in Austria

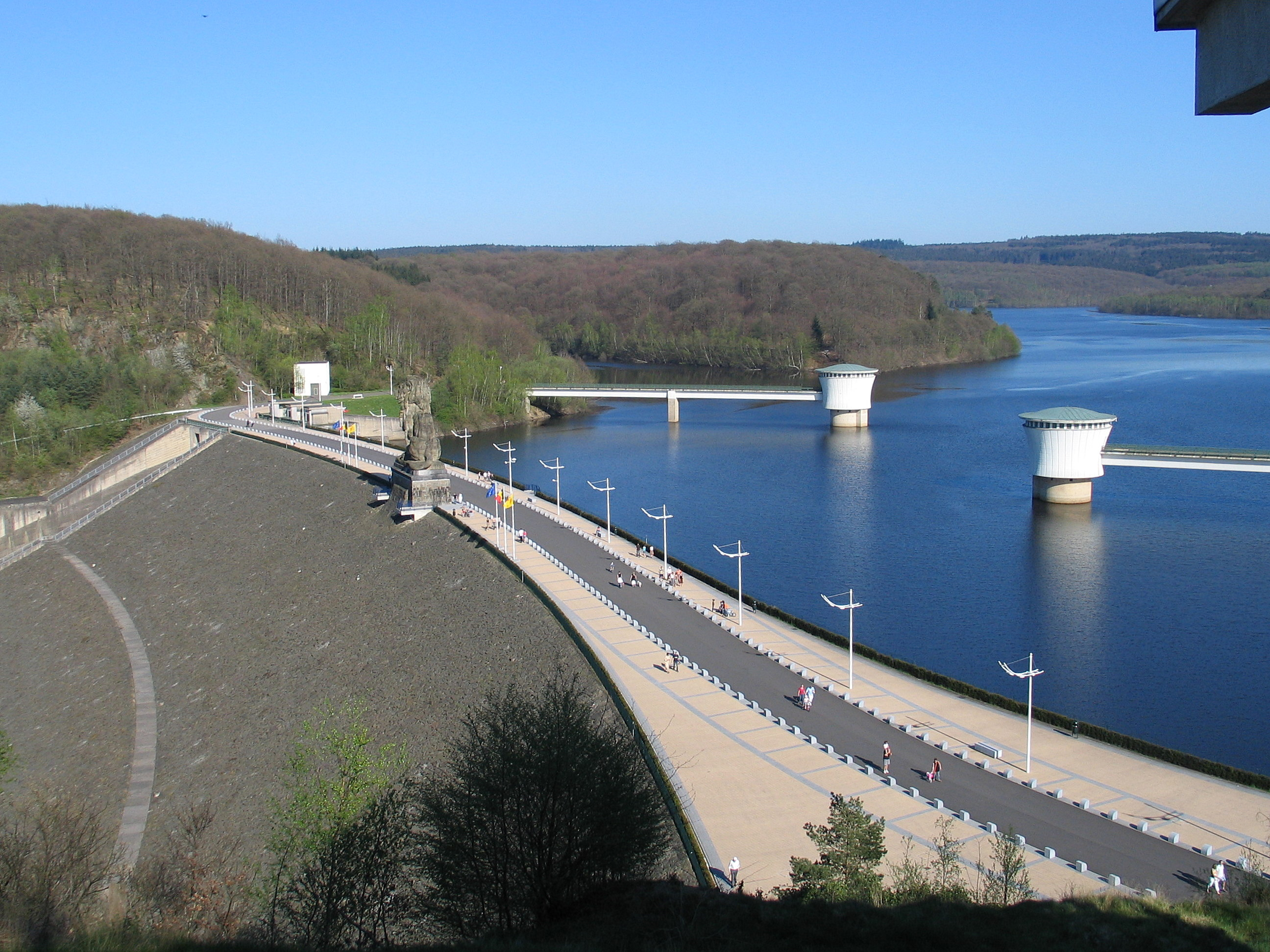
Gileppe Dam in Belgium

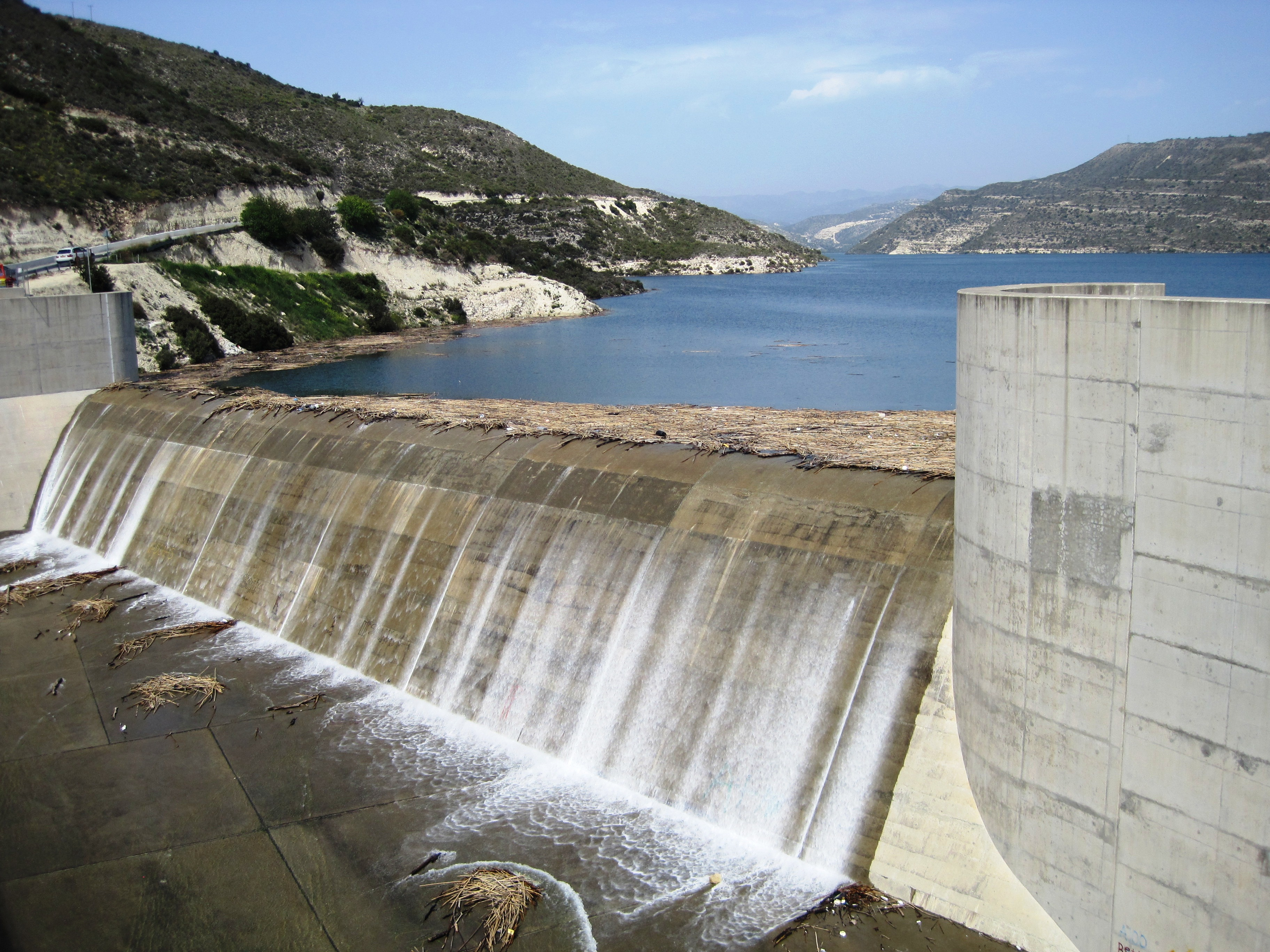
Kouris Dam in Cyprus

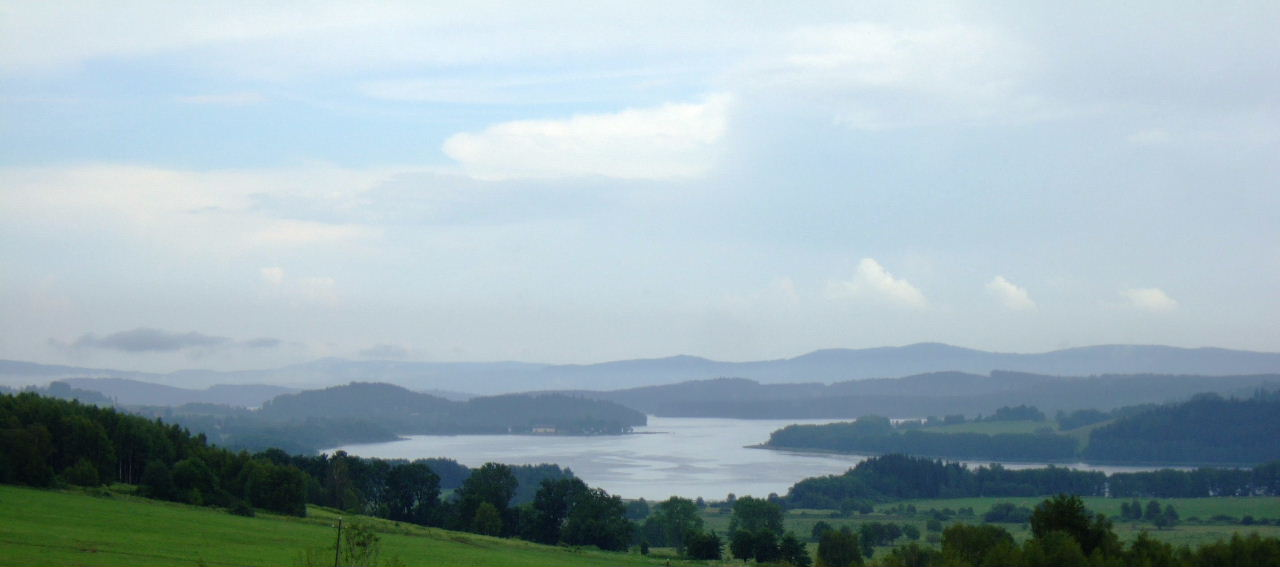
Lipno Dam in Czech Republic

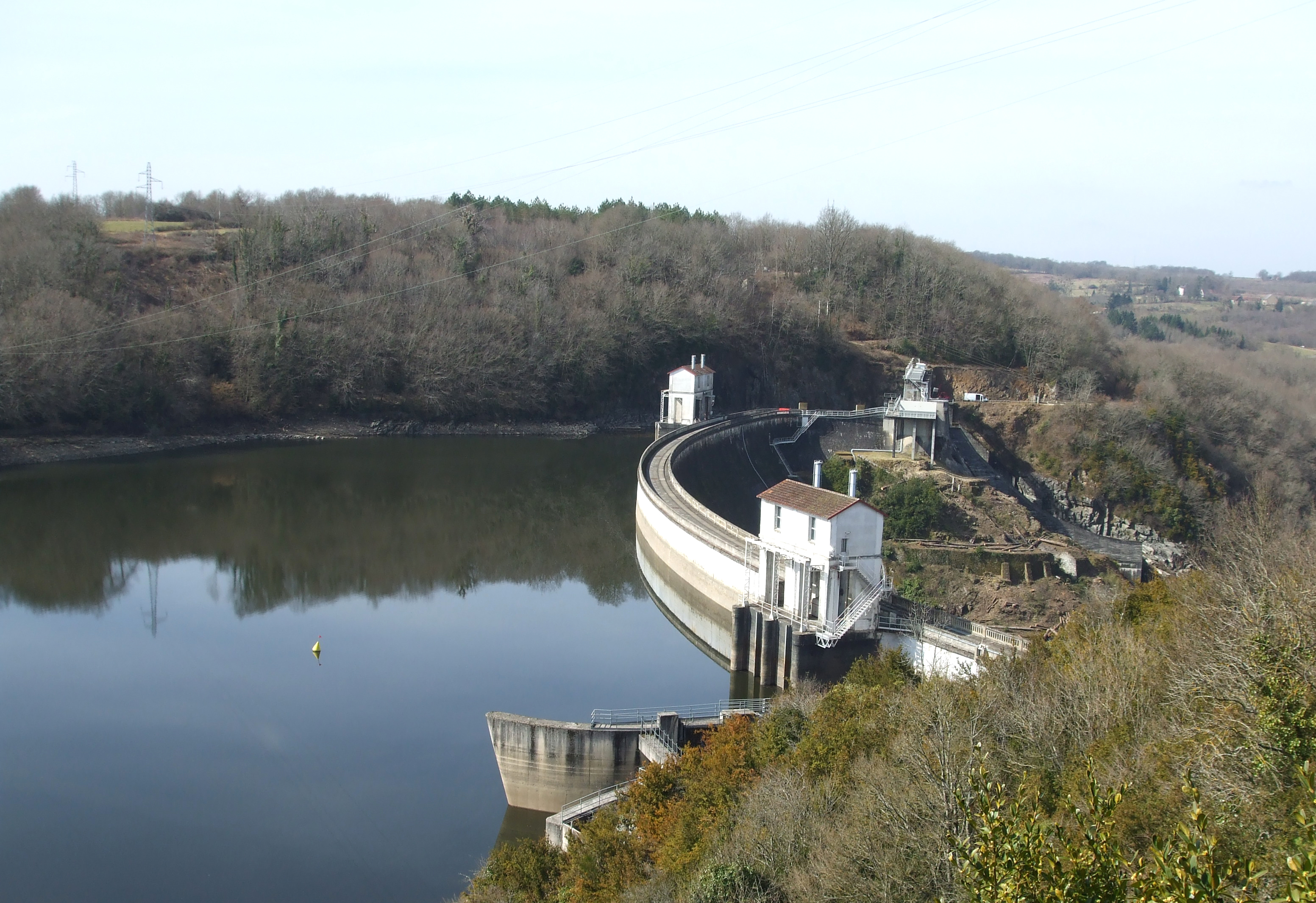
Eguzon Dam in France

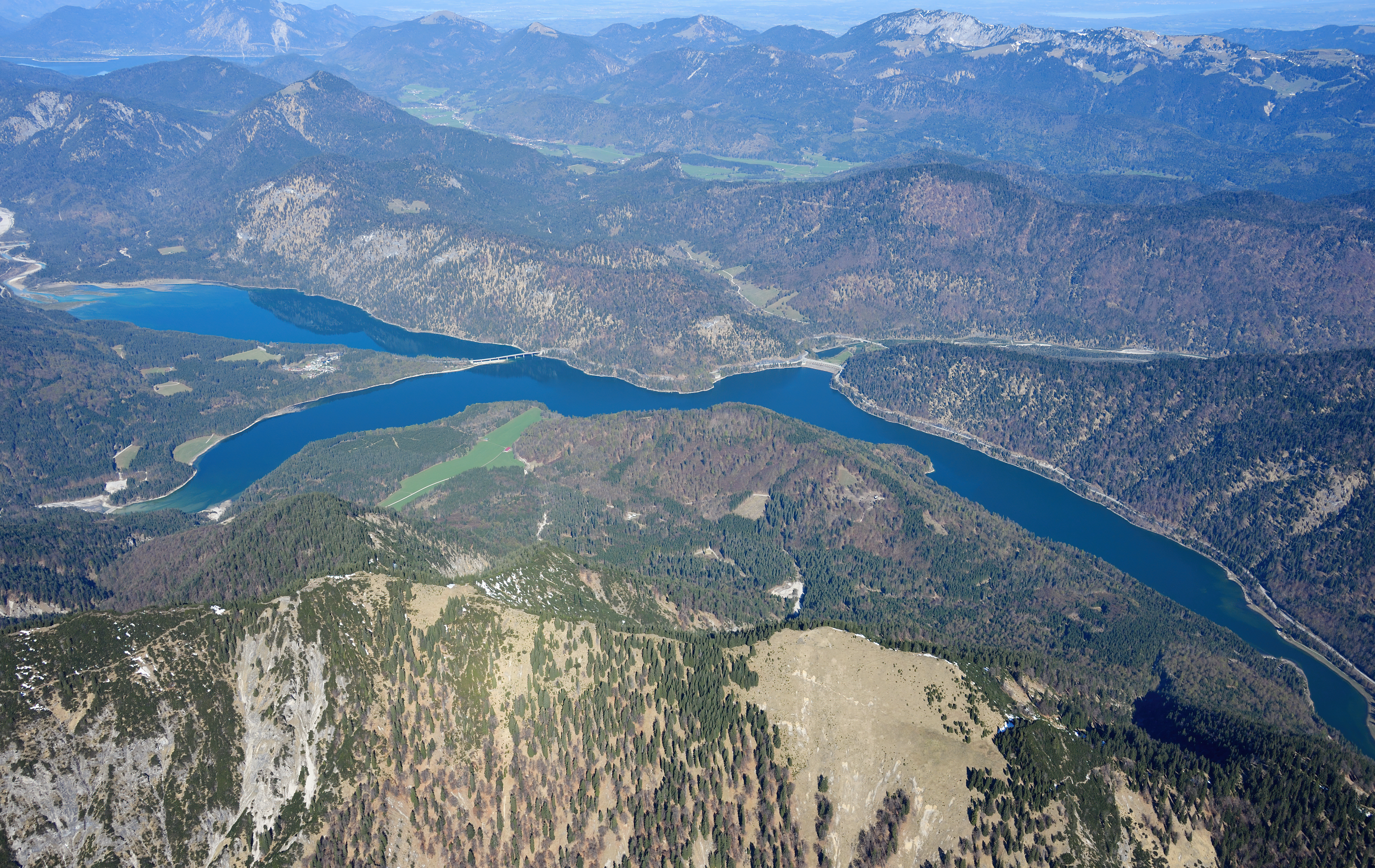
Sylvenstein Dam in Germany

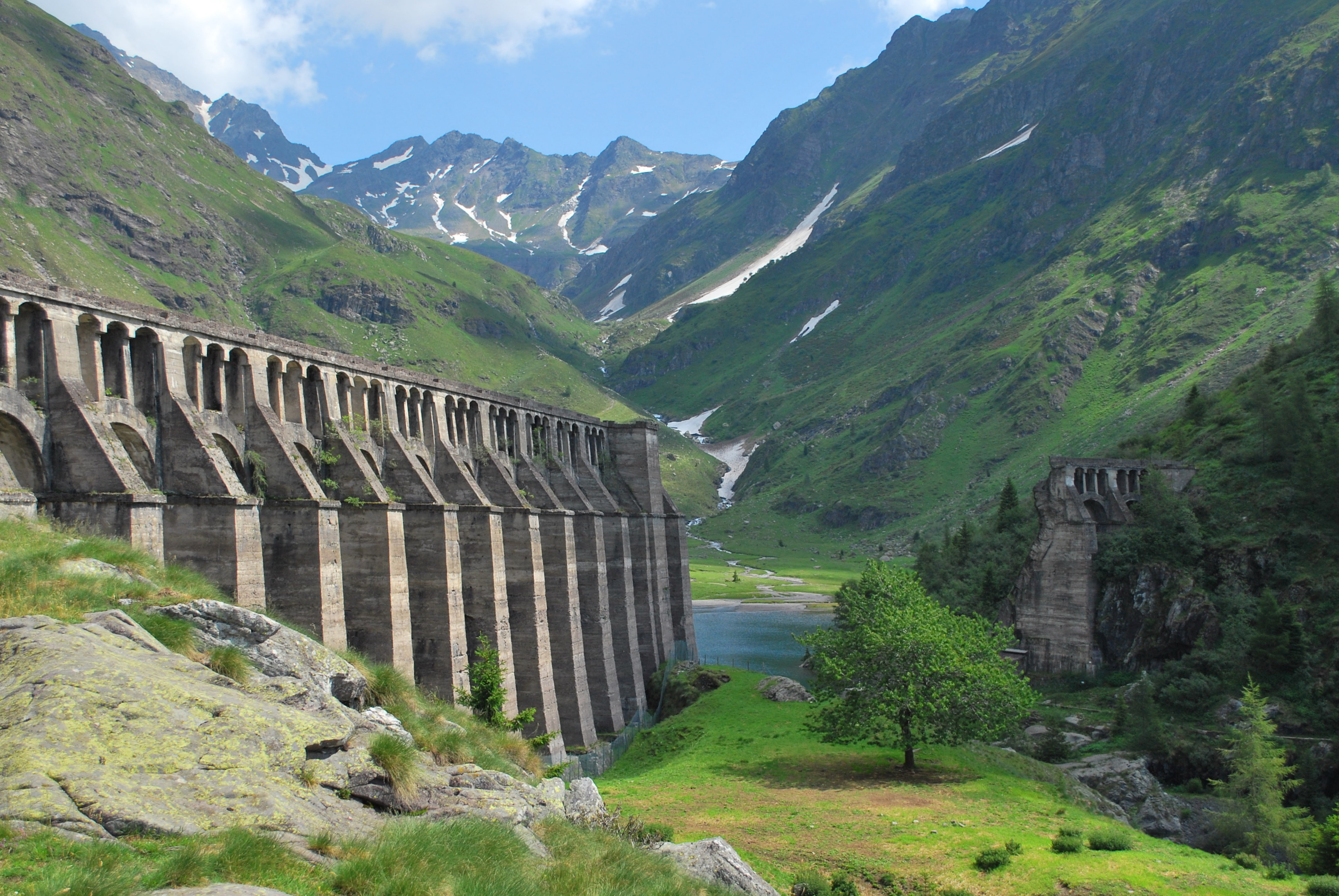
Gleno Dam in Italy

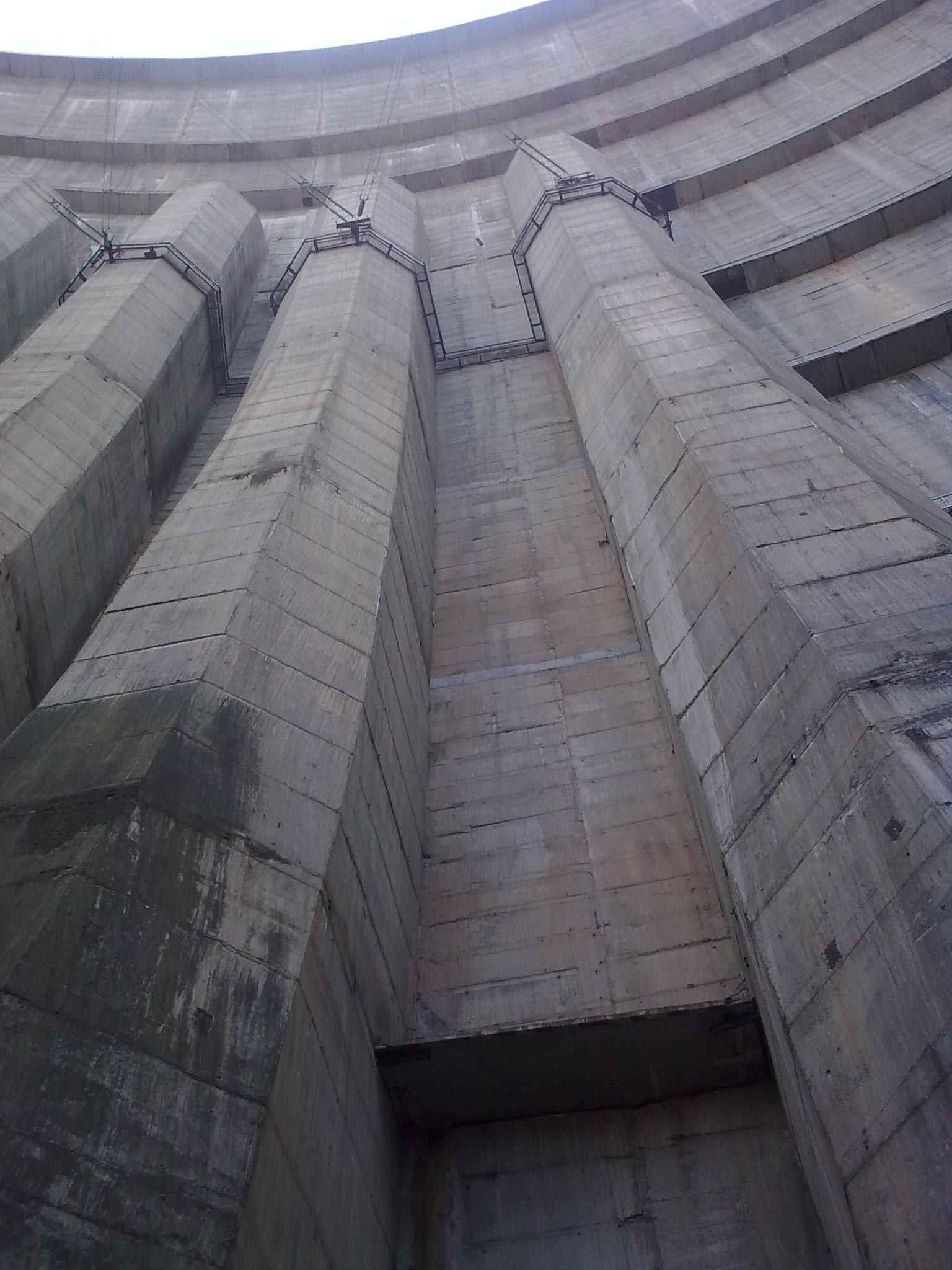
Chirkey Dam in Russia

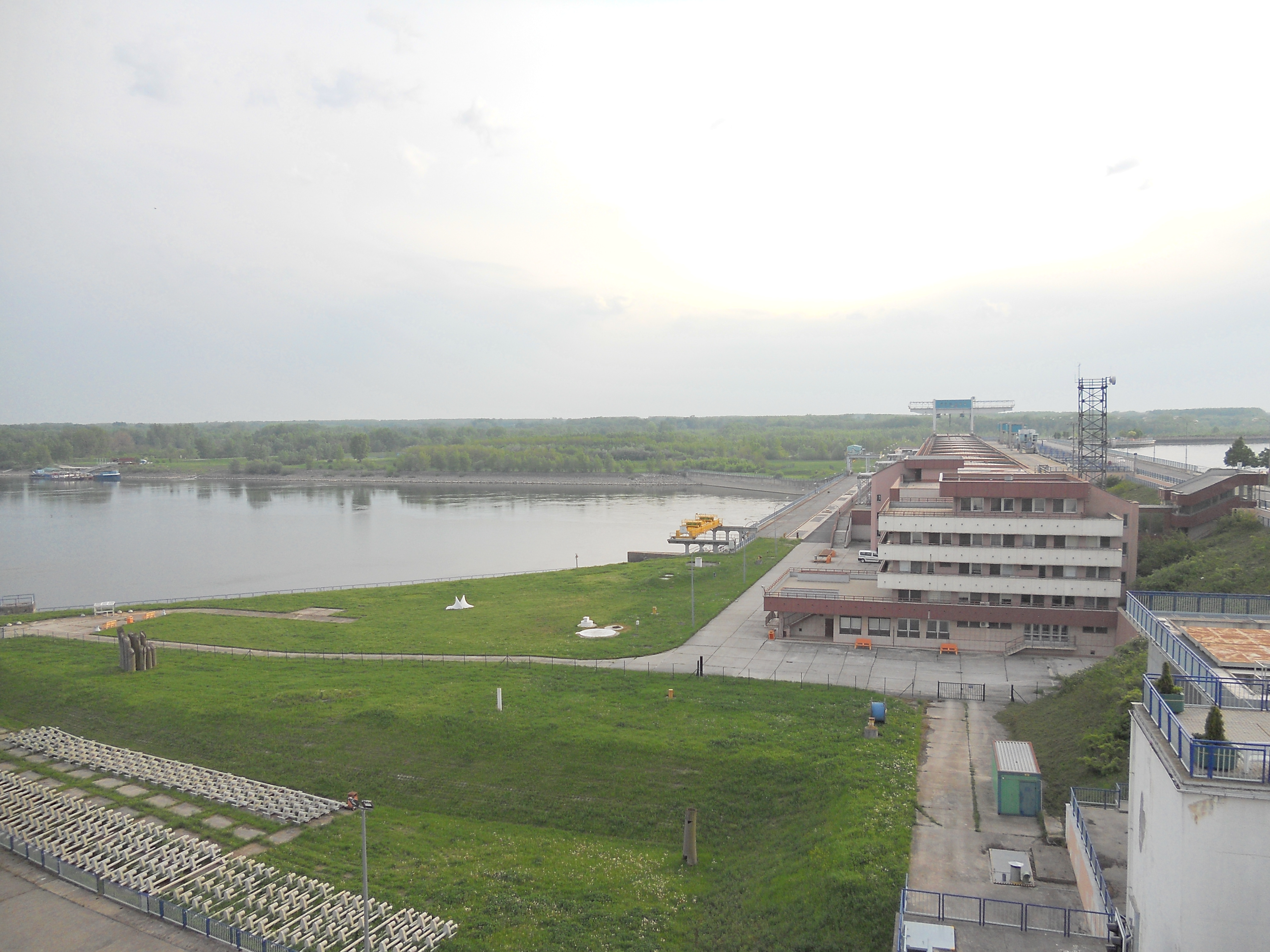
Gabčíkovo Dam in Slovakia

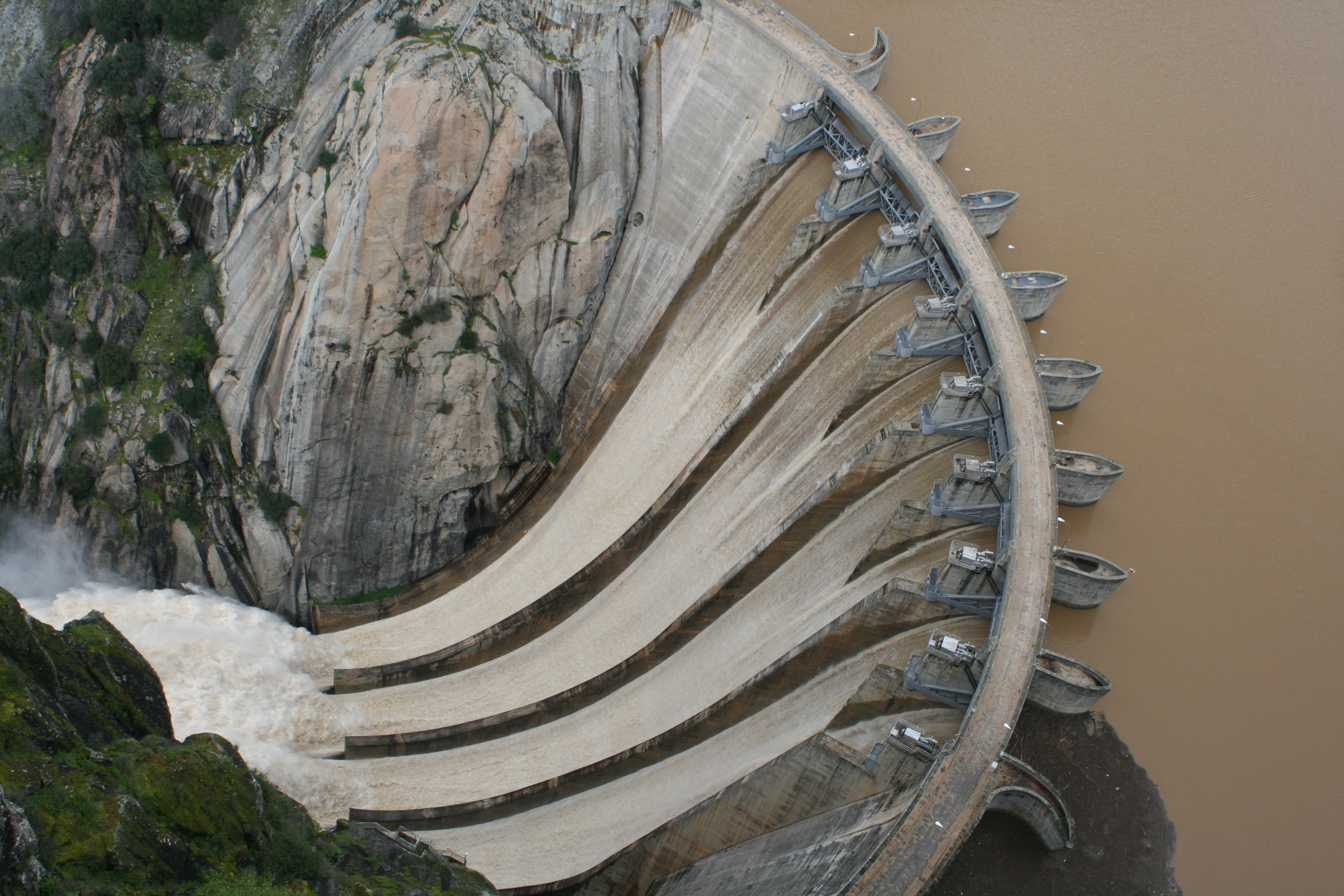
Aldeadávila Dam in Spain

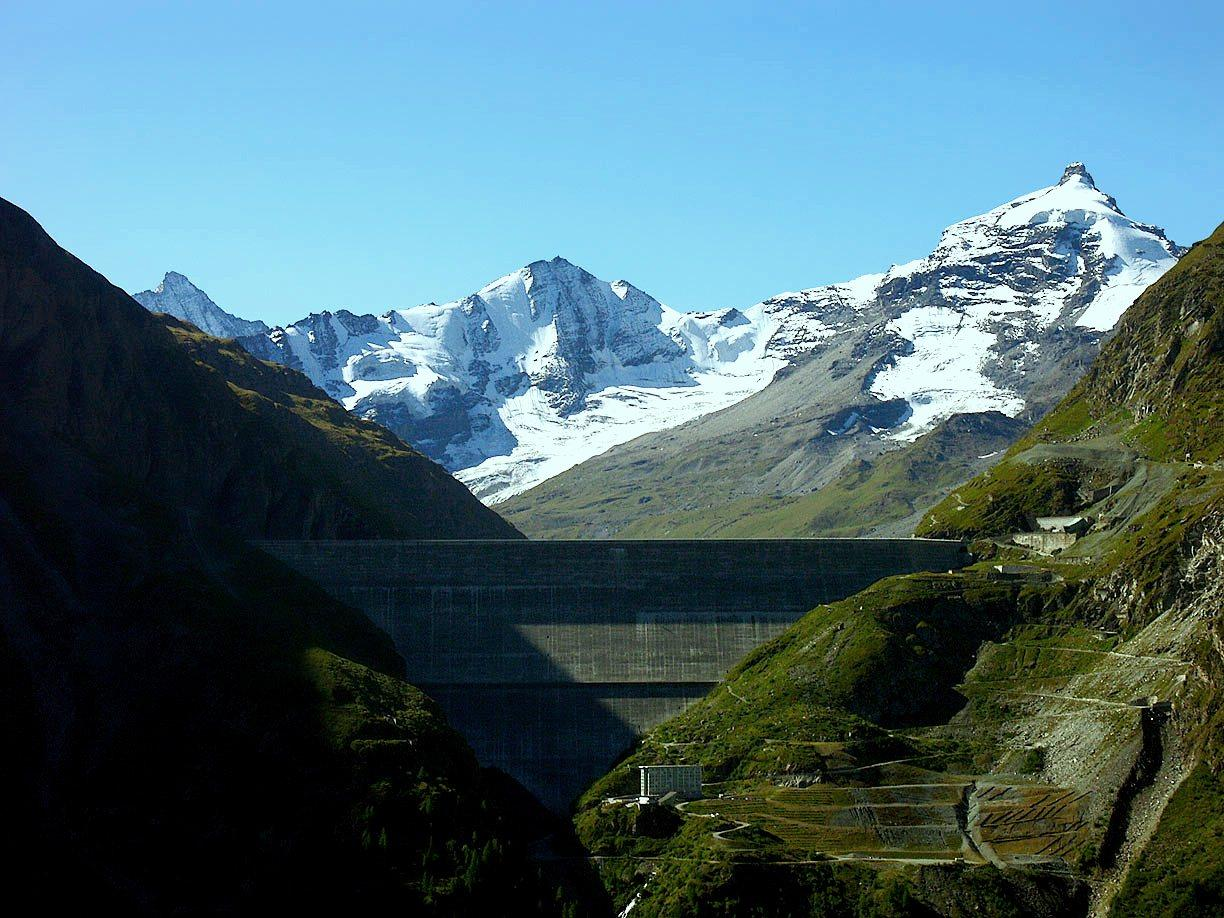
Grande Dixence Dam in Switzerland

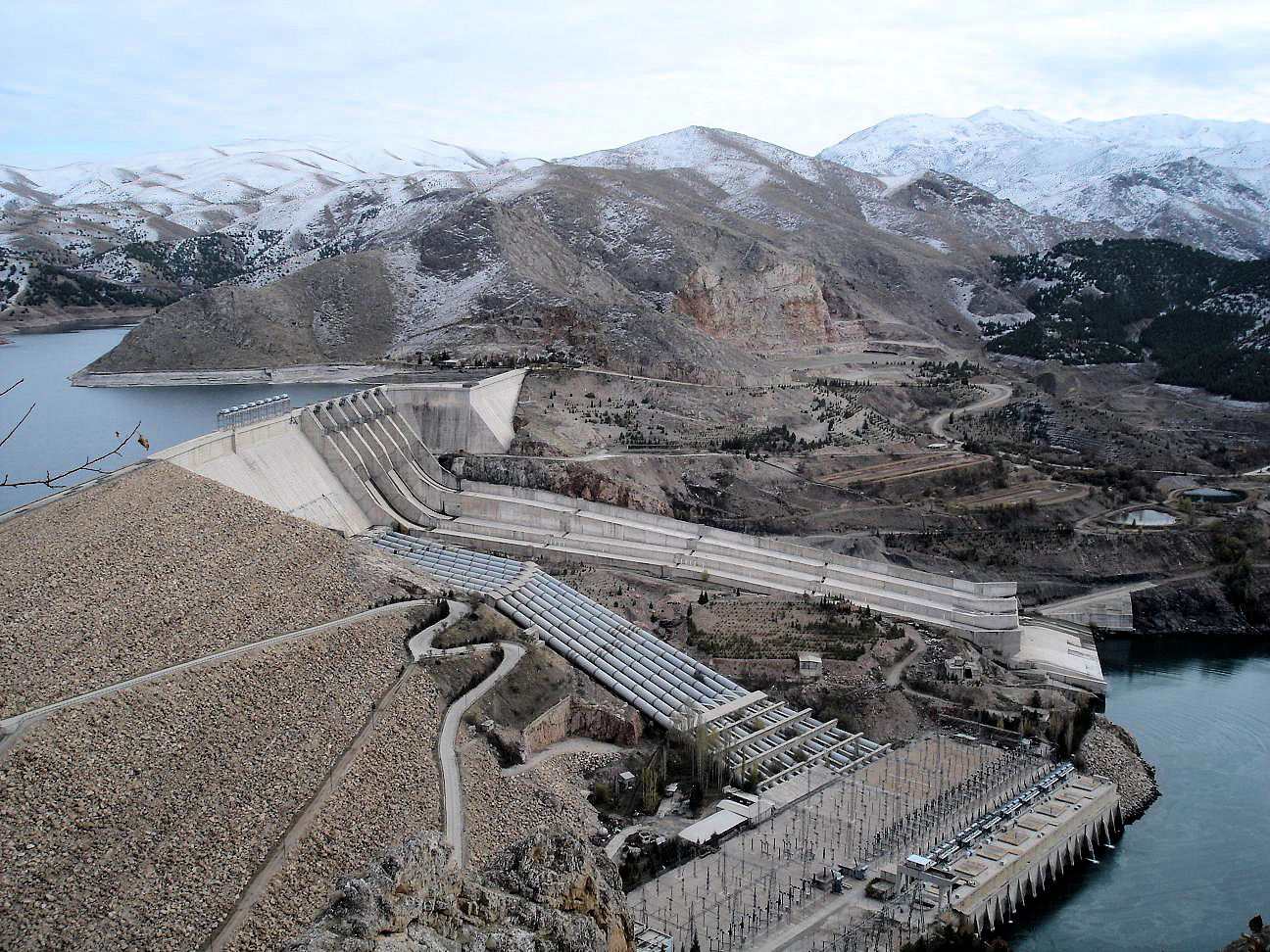
Keban Dam in Turkey

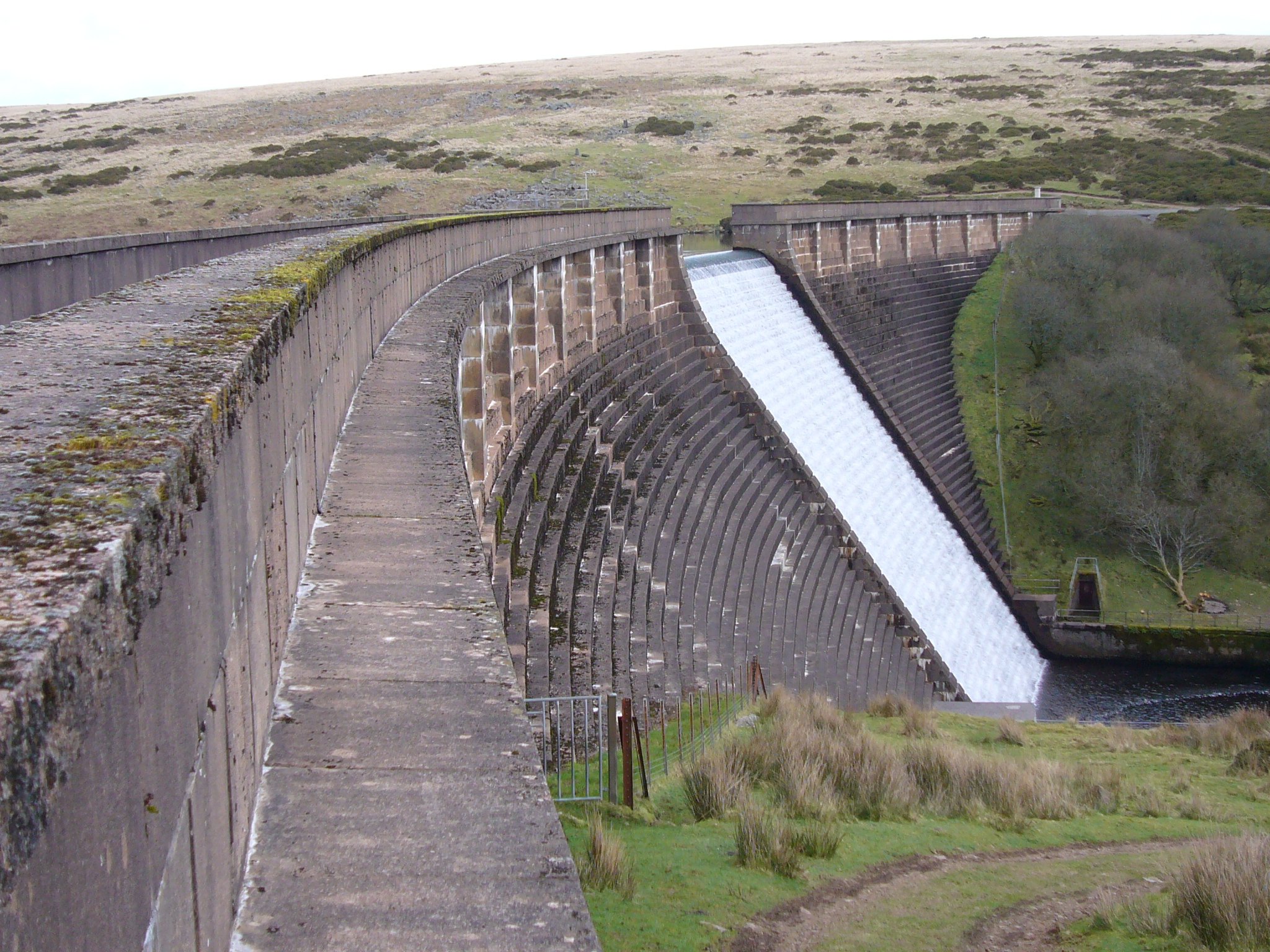
Avon Dam in United Kingdom

=== Albania ===
1. Banjë Dam
2. Fierza Dam
3. Koman Dam
4. Moglicë Dam
5. Shkopet Dam
6. Skavica Dam
7. Ulëz Dam
8. Vau i Dejës Dam

=== Andorra ===
1. Engolasters Dam - Lake Engolasters

=== Belarus ===
1. Grodno Dam

=== Belgium ===
1. Gileppe Dam

=== Bosnia and Herzegovina ===
1. Bočac Dam
2. Buk Bijela Dam
3. Buško Lake
4. Čapljina Dam
5. Glavatičevo Dam
6. Grabovica Dam
7. Grančarevo Dam (Trebinje)
8. Jablanica Dam
9. Jajce Dam
10. Konjic Dam
11. Mostarsko Blato Dam
12. Pale Dam
13. Rama Dam
14. Salakovac Dam
15. Foča Dam
16. Višegrad Dam
17. Župica Lake

=== Croatia ===
1. Čakovec Dam
2. Dubrava Dam
3. Dubrovnik Dam
4. Gojak Dam
5. Golubić Dam
6. Jaruga Dam
7. Krčić Dam
8. Miljacka Dam
9. Ozalj Dam
10. Peruća Dam - Peruća Lake
11. Roški Slap Dam
12. Senj Dam
13. Sklope Dam - Lake Krušćica
14. Varaždin Dam
15. Velebit Dam
16. Vinodol Dam
17. Zakučac Dam
18. Zeleni Vir Dam

=== Denmark ===
1. Alroe Dam
2. Denmark Dam
3. Kaloe Dam
4. Qorlortorsuaq Dam, Greenland
5. Rømø Dam
6. Tangevaerket Dam

=== Estonia ===
1. Narva Reservoir (shared with Russia)

=== Faroe Islands ===
1. Lake Eiði

=== Finland ===
1. Imatra Dam
2. Isohaara Dam
3. Jylhama Dam
4. Kalajärvi Dam - Kalajärvi Reservoir
5. Kaltimo Dam
6. Kuurna Dam
7. Lokka Dam - Lokka Reservoir
8. Melo Dam
9. Ossauskoski Dam
10. Pamilo Dam
11. Petajaskoski Dam
12. Porttipahta Dam
13. Puntarikoski Dam
14. Seitakorva Dam
15. Tainionkoski Dam
16. Taivalkoski Dam
17. Uljua Dam - Uljua Reservoir
18. Valajaskoski Dam
19. Vanttauskoski Dam
20. Venetjoki Reservoir

=== Georgia ===
1. Inguri Dam
2. Khrami Dam
3. Khudoni Dam
4. Ladzhanuri Dam
5. Namakhvani Dam
6. Samtskhe-Javakheti Dam
7. Tvishi Dam
8. Vardnili Dam
9. Zhinvali Dam
10. Zhoneti Dam

=== Greece ===
1. Kastraki Dam
2. Katsiki Dam
3. Kremasta Dam
4. Marathon Dam
5. Mesochora Dam
6. Mornos Dam
7. Plastiras Dam
8. Stratos Dam
9. Sykia Dam
10. Thisavros Dam
11. Kofini dam

=== Hungary ===
1. Fehervarcsurgoi Dam
2. Markazi Dam
3. Rakacai Dam
4. Tisza Dam, Lake Tisza

=== Iceland ===
1. Blanda Dam
2. Blöndulón
3. Kárahnjúkar Hydropower Plant
4. Sigöldulón
5. Þórisvatn

=== Ireland ===
1. Ardnacrusha
2. Carrigadrohid
3. Cathaleen's Fall
4. Cliff
5. Golden Falls
6. Inniscarra Dam
7. Leixlip lake
8. Poulaphouca Reservoir
9. Turlough Hill

=== Italy ===
1. Alpe Gera Dam
2. Campo Moro dams
3. Cancano Dam
4. Chiotas Dam
5. Cingino Dam
6. Corbara Dam
7. Frera (Belviso) Dam
8. Gleno Dam
9. Lei Dam
10. Piastra Dam
11. Place Moulin Dam
12. Ponte Cola Dam - Lake Val Vestino
13. Punt dal Gall Dam
14. Santa Giustina Dam
15. Speccheri Dam
16. Subiaco Dams
17. Vajont Dam
18. Val di Stava Dam

=== Latvia ===
1. Aiviekste Dam
2. Daugavpils Dam
3. Ķegums Dam
4. Pļaviņas Dam
5. Riga Dam

=== Lithuania ===
1. Elektrėnai Reservoir
2. Kaunas Reservoir

=== Luxembourg ===
1. Esch-sur-Sûre Dam
2. Vianden Pumped Storage Plant

=== Moldova ===
1. Dubăsari Dam
2. Stânca-Costeşti Dam

=== Montenegro ===
1. Mratinje Dam

=== Netherlands ===
1. Afsluitdijk
2. Delta Works
3. Haringvlietdam
4. Hartelkering
5. Oosterscheldekering
6. Philipsdam
7. Sloedam
8. Zuiderzee Works

=== North Macedonia ===
1. Boškov Dam
2. Čebren Dam
3. Kozjak Dam
4. Spilje Dam, Lake Debar
5. Tikveš Dam
6. Vrutok Dam

=== Norway ===
1. Abo Dam
2. Aura Dam
3. Aurland Dam
4. Bratsberg Dam
5. Brokke Dam
6. Byrte Dam
7. Cårrujavrit Dam
8. Evanger Dam
9. Finndøla Dam
10. Fortun Dam
11. Glomfjord Dam
12. Hakavik Dam
13. Hammeren Dam
14. Hardeland Dam
15. Hjartdøla Dam
16. Hylen Dam
17. Kjofossen Dam
18. Kvilldal Dam
19. Lassa Dam
20. Little Dam
21. Løkjelsvatnet
22. Lysebotn Dam
23. Mår Dam
24. Matre Dam
25. Mauranger Dam
26. Melkefoss Dam
27. Nea Dam
28. Nes Dam
29. Nore Dam
30. Nygårds Dam
31. Paatsjoki Dam
32. Rana Dam
33. Ringedals Dam
34. Såheim Dam
35. Saurdal Dam
36. Sildvik Dam
37. Sima Dam
38. Skogfoss Dam
39. Storglomvatn Dam
40. Svartevatn Dam
41. Svartisen Dam
42. Svelgfoss Dam
43. Svorkmo Dam
44. Tjodan Dam
45. Tokke Dam
46. Tonstad Dam
47. Tunnsjødal Dam
48. Tyin Dam
49. Tyssedal Dam
50. Vamma Dam
51. Vatnedalen Dam
52. Vemork Dam
53. Vinje Dam
54. Virdnejávri Dam, Virdnejávri

=== Serbia ===
Kosovo:

1. Badovc Dam
2. Batlava Dam
3. Gazivoda (Ujman) Dam
4. Prilepnica Dam
5. Radoniqi Dam

=== Slovakia ===
1. Gabčíkovo Dam on river Danube
2. Liptovská Mara on river Váh
3. Orava (reservoir)
4. Sĺňava on river Váh
5. Starina reservoir
6. Tajchy artificial water reservoirs in the Štiavnica Mountains
7. Veľká Domaša on river Ondava
8. Zemplínska Šírava on river Laborec

=== Slovenia ===
1. Ajba Dam
2. Avče Dam
3. Blanca Dam
4. Boštanj Dam
5. Dravograd Dam
6. Markovci Dam
7. Mavčiče Dam
8. Medvode Dam
9. Moste Dam
10. Podselo Dam
11. Solkan Dam
12. Vuhred Dam
13. Zlatoličje Dam

=== Spain ===
1. Aldeadávila Dam
2. Alcántara Dam
3. El Atazar Dam
4. Entrepeñas
5. Itoiz
6. Riaño
7. Salime
8. Talarn Dam
9. Tous
10. Yesa Reservoir

=== Sweden ===
1. Älvkarleby Dam
2. Ebbe Dam
3. Harsprånget Dam
4. Hojum Dam
5. Olidan Dam
6. Porjus Dam
7. Suorva
8. Trängslet Dam

=== Ukraine ===
1. Dnieper reservoir cascade
2. Cuciurgan Reservoir
3. Dnieper Reservoir
4. Kakhovka Reservoir
5. Kamianske Reservoir
6. Kaniv Reservoir
7. Kleban-Buk Reservoir
8. Kremenchuk Reservoir
9. Kyiv Reservoir
10. Oskil Reservoir
11. Ternopil Pond
12. Travianske Reservoir

== North and Central America ==
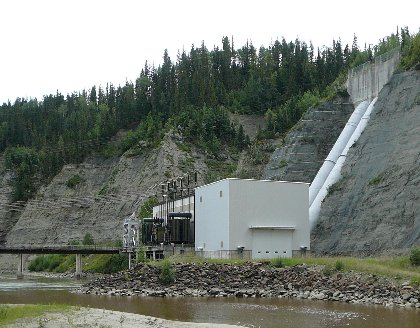
Brazeau Reservoir in Canada

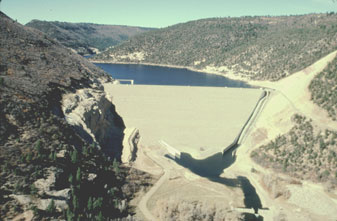
McPhee Dam in United States

=== Belize ===
1. Chalillo Dam

=== Costa Rica ===
1. Lake Arenal
2. Lake Cachí
3. Presa Sangregado Dam
4. Reventazón Dam

=== Cuba ===
1. Canasí Dam
2. Chalons Dam
3. Hanabanilla Dam
4. Jibacoa Dam
5. La Yaya Dam
6. Lebrije Dam
7. Nuevo Mundo Dam
8. Melones Dam
9. Porvenir Dam
10. Zaza Dam

=== El Salvador ===
1. Cerrón Grande Dam

=== Guatemala ===
1. Aguacapa Dam
2. Chixoy Dam
3. Jurún Marinalá Dam
4. Las Vacas Dam
5. Los Esclavos Dam
6. Santa María Dam
7. Xacbal Dam
8. Xalalá Dam

=== Haiti ===
1. Péligre Dam

=== Honduras ===
1. El Cajón
2. Francisco Morazan

=== Jamaica ===
1. Hermitage Dam
2. Mona Dam
3. Rio Bueno Dam
4. Rio Cobre Dam

=== Mexico ===
1. Adolfo Ruiz Cortines Dam
2. Aguamilpa Dam
3. Álvaro Obregón Dam
4. Amistad Dam
5. Angostura Dam
6. Cerro de Oro Dam
7. Chicoasén Dam
8. El Cajón Dam
9. Emilio López Zamora dam
10. Falcon Dam
11. Huites Dam
12. Infiernillo Dam
13. International Diversion Dam
14. La Boquilla Dam
15. La Yesca Dam
16. Lago Colina Dam
17. Lake Amistad Dam International Crossing
18. Lázaro Cárdenas Dam
19. Malpaso Dam
20. Miguel Alemán Dam
21. Morelos Dam
22. Ojo de Agua Dam
23. Peñitas Dam
24. San Jerónimo Dam
25. Zimapán Dam

=== Nicaragua ===
1. El Dorado Dam - Lake Asturias
2. Mancotal Dam - Lake Apanás
3. Tumarín Dam
4. Virgen Dam

=== Panama ===
1. Barro Blanco Dam
2. Bayano Dam
3. Bonyic Dam
4. Changuinola Dam
5. Fortuna Dam
6. Gatun Dam
7. Madden Dam
8. Panama Canal

=== Puerto Rico ===
1. Carraizo Dam
2. Portugues Dam

=== Saint Lucia ===
1. John Compton Dam

== Oceania ==
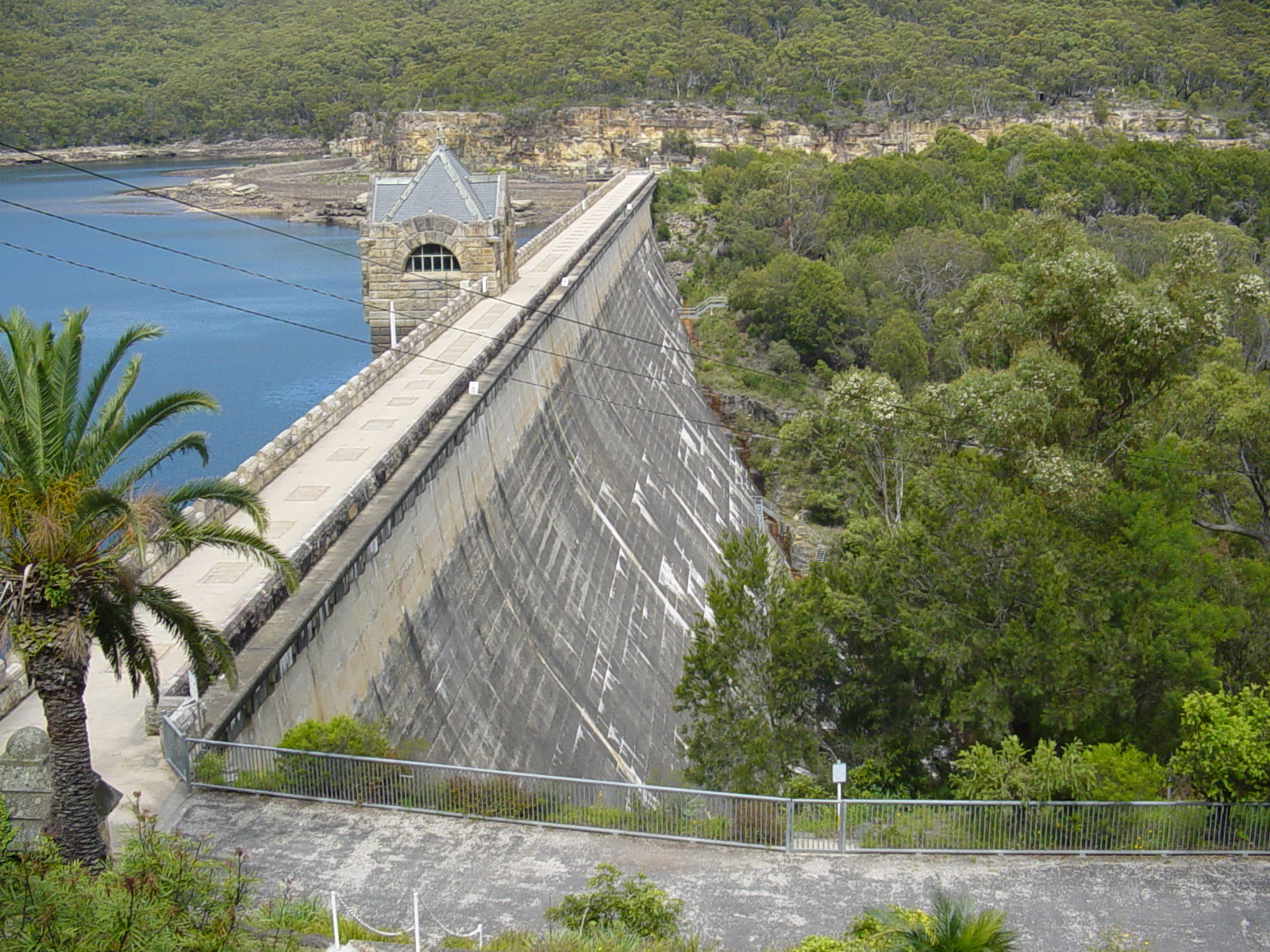
Cataract Dam in Australia

=== Fiji ===
1. Monasavu Dam
2. Nadarivatu Dam
3. Vaturu Dam

=== New Caledonia ===
1. Néaoua Dam
2. Tu Dam
3. Yaté Dam

=== Papua New Guinea ===
1. Yonki Dam

== South America ==
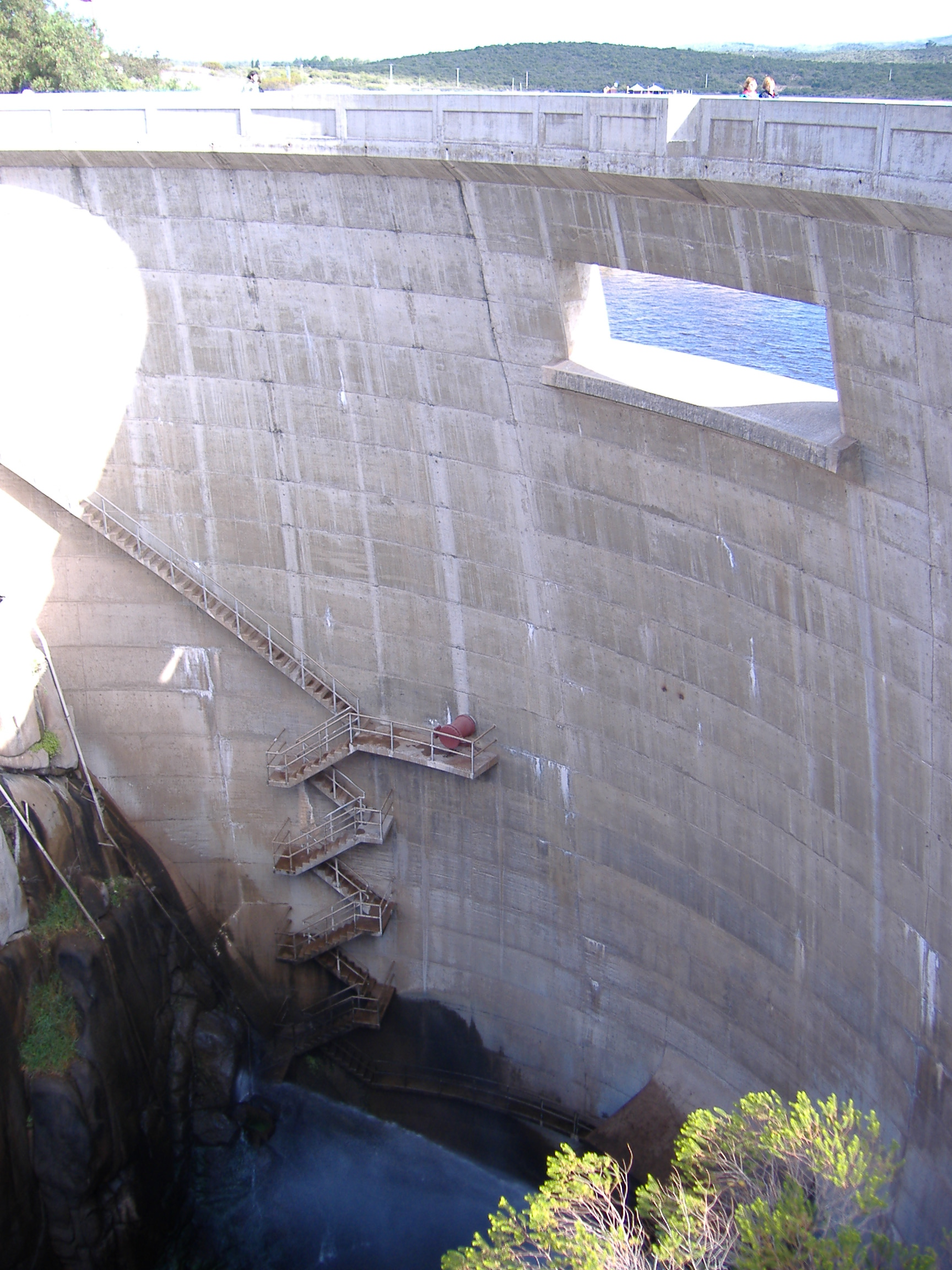
El Cajón Dam in Argentina

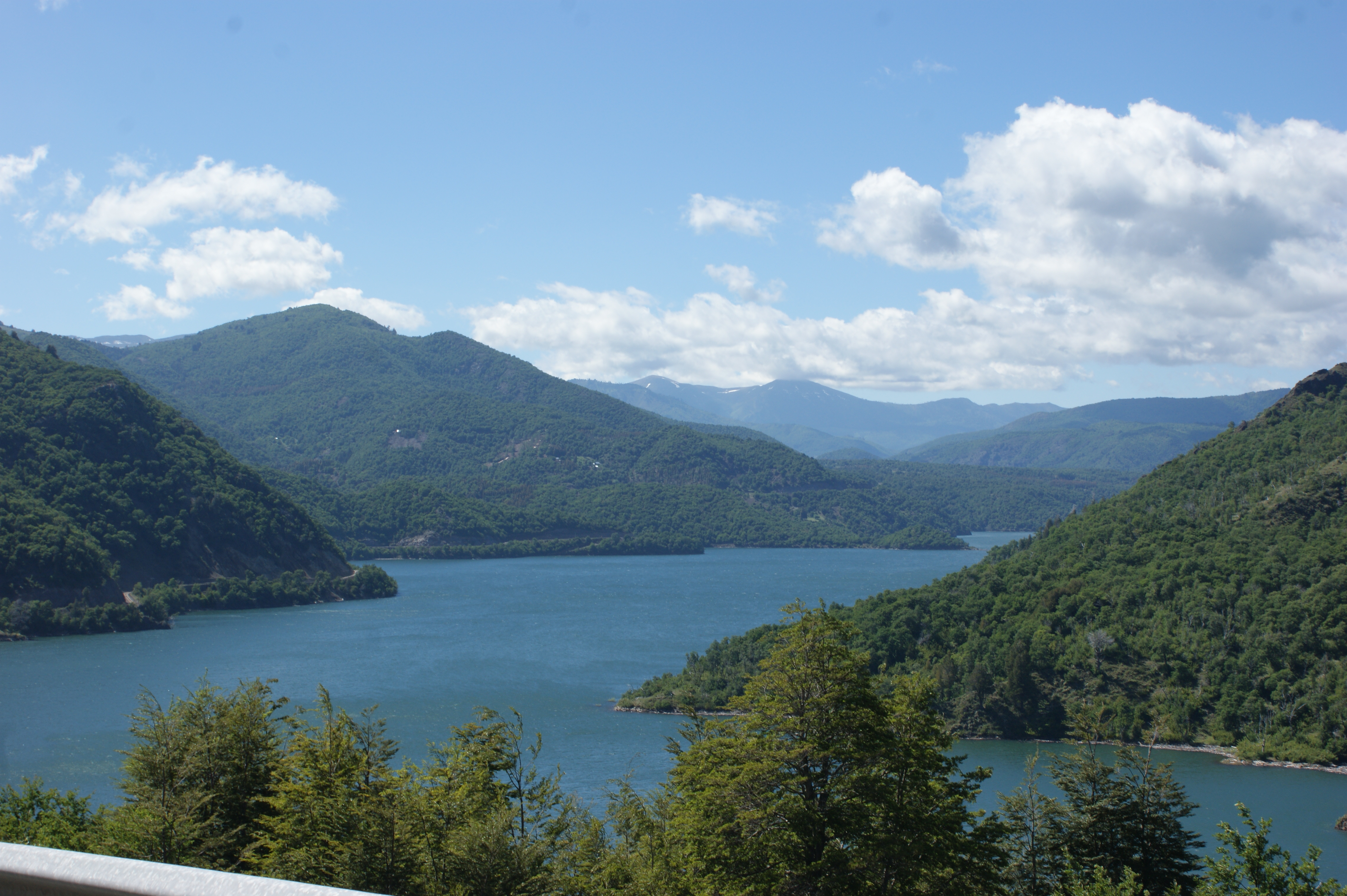
Ralco Dam in Chile

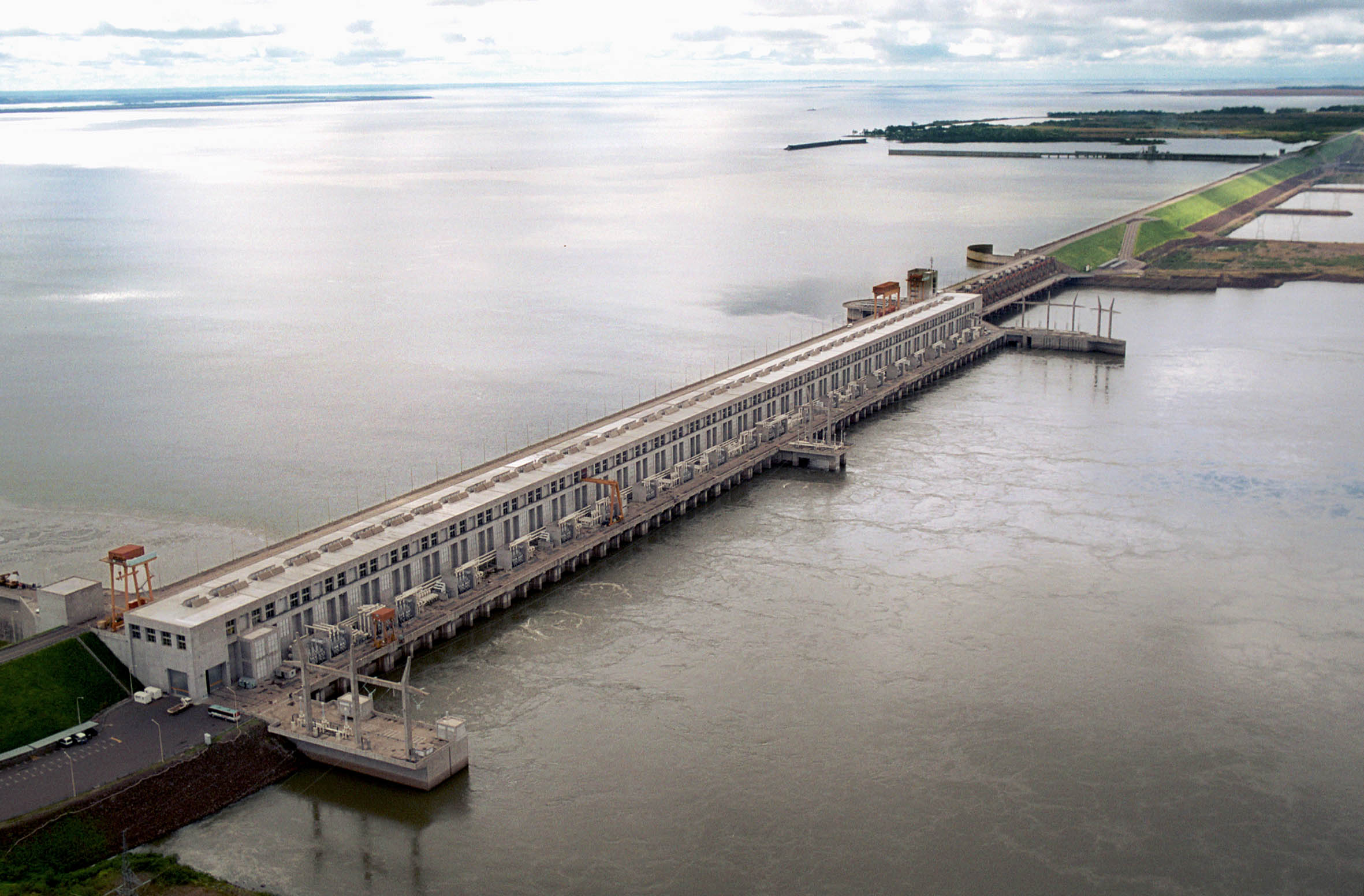
Yacyretá Dam in Paraguay and Argentina

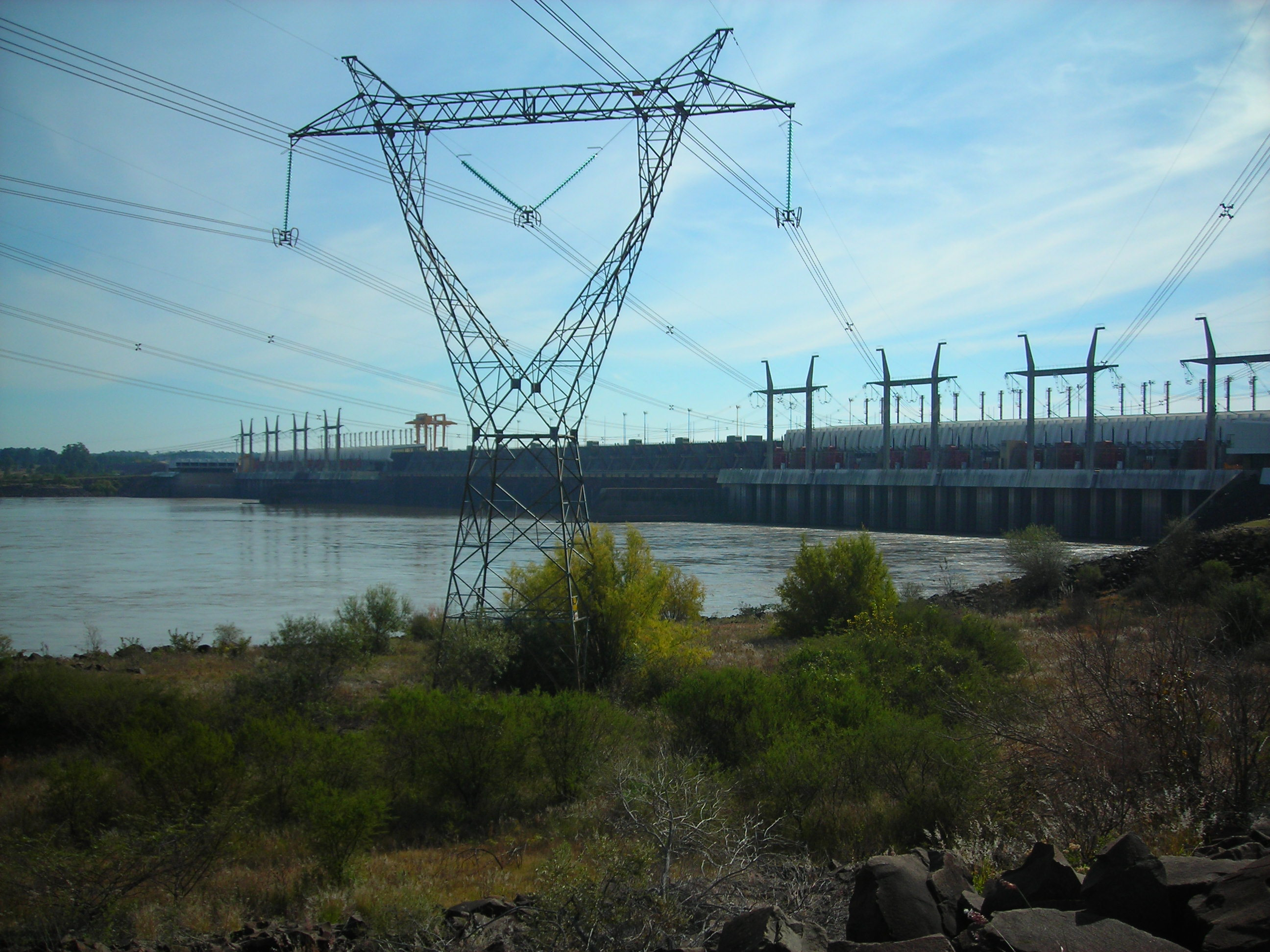
Salto Grande Dam in Uruguay and Argentina

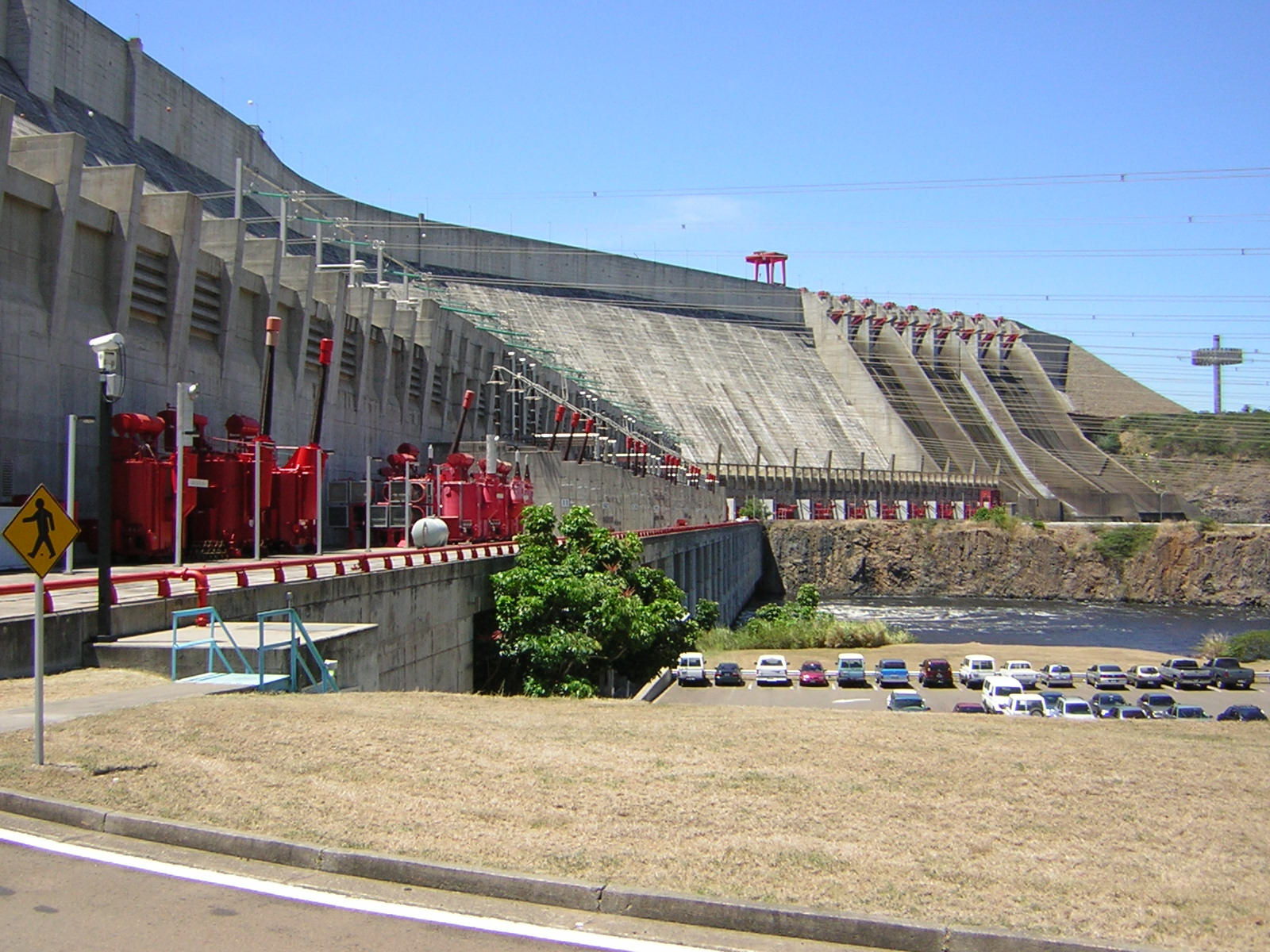
Guri Dam in Venezuela

=== Argentina ===
1. Agua del Toro Dam
2. Alicurá
3. Arroyito
4. Arroyo Corto Dam
5. Blas Brisoli Dam
6. Caracoles Dam
7. Casa de Piedra Dam
8. Cerro Pelado Dam
9. Chocón
10. El Cajón Dam
11. Ingeniero Ballester Dam
12. Jorge Cepernic Dam
13. La Viña Dam
14. Loma de la Lata Dam
15. Los Caracoles Dam
16. Los Molinos
17. Mari - Menuco Dam
18. Néstor Kirchner Dam
19. Pichi Picún Leufú
20. Piedra del Aguila
21. Planicie Banderita Dam
22. Portezuelo Dam
23. Punta Negra Dam
24. Quebrada de Ullúm Dam
25. Salto Grande (shared with Uruguay)
26. San Roque
27. Yaciretá Dam (shared with Paraguay)

=== Bolivia ===
1. Inkachaka Dam
2. Milluni Lake
3. Misicuni Dam
4. Warawara Lake (Cochabamba)

=== Chile ===
1. Aromos
2. Calabocillo
3. Cogotí
4. Colbún
5. Convento Viejo
6. Digua
7. El Yeso
8. La Invernada
9. La Paloma
10. Lago Laja
11. Laguna del Maule
12. Lautaro
13. Machicura
14. Melado
15. Pangue
16. Polcura
17. Puclaro
18. Ralco
19. Rapel
20. Recoleta
21. Santa Juana
22. Vega Larga

=== Colombia ===
1. Alberto Lleras Dam
2. Calima Lake
3. Chingaza Dam
4. El Quimbo Dam
5. Guaicaramo Dam
6. Ituango Dam
7. La Esmeralda Dam
8. Miel I Dam
9. Porce III Dam
10. Punchiná Dam
11. Salvajina Dam
12. Sogamoso Dam

=== Ecuador ===
1. Mazar Dam
2. Paute Dam

=== French Guiana ===
1. Petit-Saut Dam

=== Guyana ===
1. Amaila Dam

=== Paraguay ===
1. Itaipu Dam (shared with Brazil)
2. Yaciretá Dam (shared with Argentina)

=== Peru ===
1. Antamina Tailings Dam
2. Limon Dam
3. Upamayu Dam

=== Suriname ===
1. Afobaka Dam
2. Brokopondo Reservoir

=== Uruguay ===
1. Salto Grande (shared with Argentina)

=== Venezuela ===
1. Caruachi Dam
2. Guri Dam
3. Macagua Dam
4. Tocoma Dam

== See also ==
- List of reservoirs by volume
- List of reservoirs by surface area
- List of largest dams
- List of world's tallest dams
- List of hydropower stations in Africa
- List of lakes
