= List of monuments in Gali Municipality =

The monuments in the Gali Municipality is a group of cultural heritage sites registered by the government of Georgia on the territory of a de jure territorial unit, which corresponds to the Gali District in Abkhazia. (Note: The political status of Abkhazia is disputed. Having unilaterally declared independence from Georgia in 1992, Abkhazia is formally recognised as an independent state by 5 UN member states (two other states previously recognised it but then withdrew their recognition), while the remainder of the international community recognizes it as de jure Georgian territory. Georgia continues to claim the area as its own territory, designating it as Russian-occupied territory.)

The table lists a monument, its location and dating as well as the status attached to it by the Georgian authorities and the number assigned in the registry by the National Agency for Cultural Heritage Preservation of Georgia, which is available online as a GIS portal. The Agency broadly classifies the heritage sites into two groups: 1) the objects without a status, and 2) immovable monuments of cultural heritage.

Object	National Registry number	Date of construction	Location	Status	Image
Gudava Saint Barbara Church		6th-7th centuries	Gali		
Dikhazurga fortress		16th-17th centuries	Dikhazurga		
Dikhazurga Saint Barbara Church			Dikhazurga		
Enguri bridge fortress		16th-18th centuries	Otsartse		
Zemo ghumurishi fortress	7221	19th-20th centuries	Zemo ghumurishi	Cultural Monument	
Tagiloni fortress		Middle Ages	Tagiloni		
Tagiloni fortress		Middle Ages	Tagiloni		
Kelasuri church		19th-20th centuries	Makhunjia		
Makhunjia Church		Middle Ages	Makhunjia		
Nabakevi Church		Middle Ages	Nabakevi		
Nakarghali settlement		Bronze Age	Pichori		
Oqumi shed		6th Millennium-4th Millennium BC	Gali		
Church of the Annunciation in Oqumi	7222	11th-19th centuries	Oqumi	Cultural Monument	
Saberio church (Sasharashio)		Middle Ages	Saberio		
Saberio church (Chotuebis)		Middle Ages	Saberio		
Satanjo fortress		8th-10th centuries	Chuburkhinji		
Pichori church		Middle Ages	Pichori		
Pshauri church		14th century	Pshauri		
Ghumurishi Sagergaio Church		16th century	Zemo Ghumurishi		
Ghumurishi Church		19th century	Qvemo Ghumurishi		
Shesheleti church		Middle Ages	Shesheleti		
Chkhortoli church	7220	Middle Ages	Chkhortoli	Cultural Monument	
Chkhortoli church (11th-19th centuries)		11th-19th centuries	Chkhortoli		
Chkhortoli fortress		Middle Ages	Chkhortoli		
Church of the Archangel in Tsarche		1912	Tsarche		
Church of the Epiphany in Tsarche	7062	19th century	Tsarche	Cultural Monument	
Tsarche Fiweriste church		Middle Ages	Tsarche		
Tsarche fortress	7071	Middle Ages	Cultural Monument		
Chuburkhinji Saint George Church	7063	19th century	Chuburkhinji	Cultural Monument	

== See also ==
- List of Cultural Heritage Monuments of Georgia
