= Abkhazia–Georgia border =

De facto administrative border line

Map of Abkhazia, with Georgia to the east

The Abkhazia–Georgia separation line is a de facto boundary set up in the aftermath of the War in Abkhazia and Russo-Georgian War, which separates the self-declared Republic of Abkhazia from the territory controlled by the Government of Georgia. Republic of Abkhazia, and those states that recognise its independence, view the line as an international border separating two sovereign states, whereas the Georgian government and most other countries refer to it as an 'Administrative Border Line' within Georgian territory. The Georgian government views Abkhazia as a Russian-occupied Georgian territory and designates the de facto boundary as an occupation line in accordance with the Georgian "Law on Occupied Territories of Georgia". The Constitution of Georgia recognizes Abkhazia as autonomous within Georgia, therefore the line corresponds to the 'Administrative Border' of the Autonomous Republic of Abkhazia within Georgian territory.

== Description ==
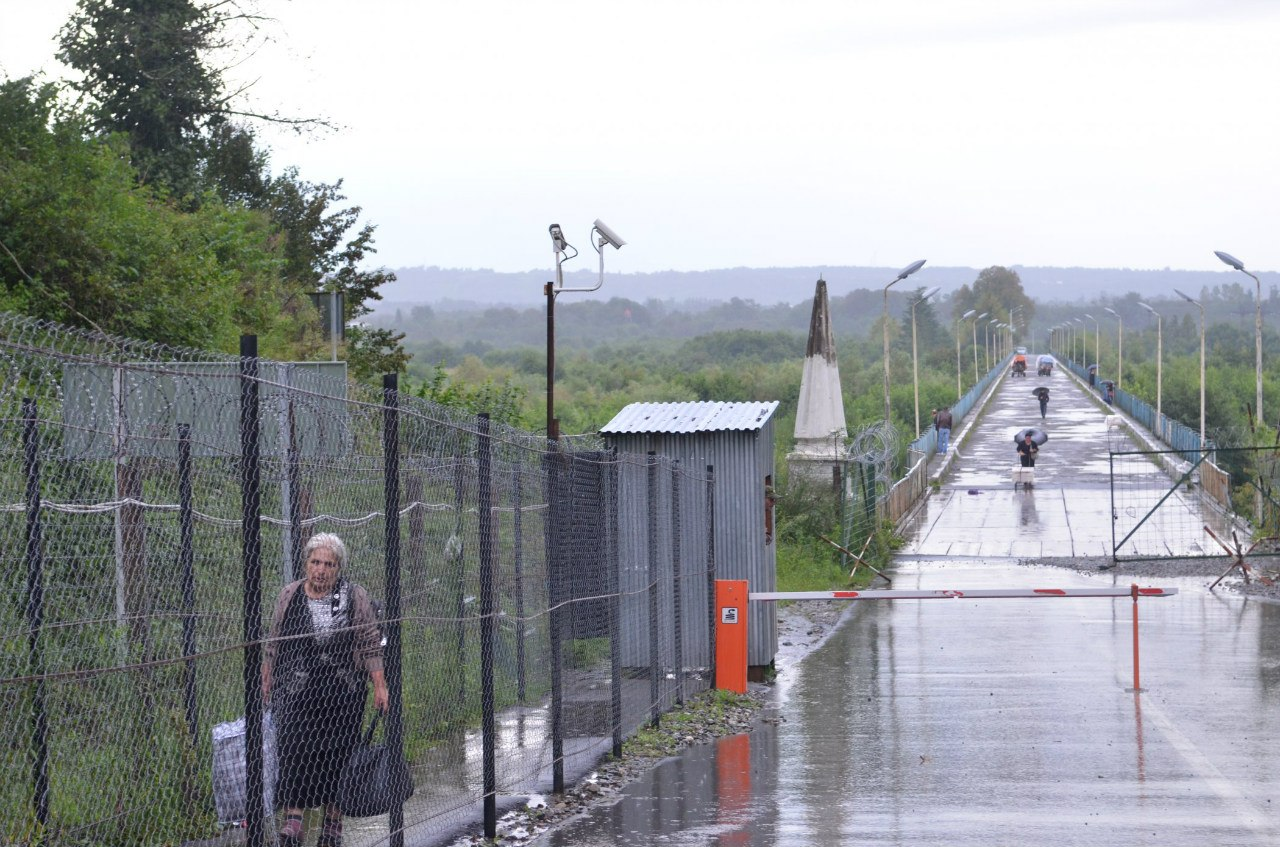
Enguri Bridge over the Enguri river border

The border starts in the north at the tripoint with Russia on the Caucasus Mountains, and proceeds overland in a broadly south-westwards directions past peaks such as Mounts Kharikhra, Moguashirkha and Akiba. In the southern stretches it runs along the Enguri River, before terminating at the Black Sea coast just north of Anaklia.

== History ==
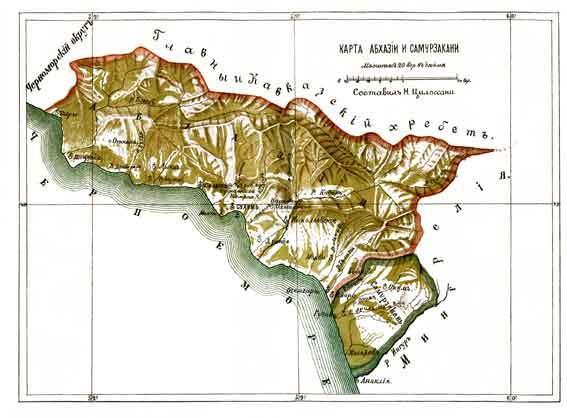
An 1899 map depicting Sukhum okrug with Samurzakano

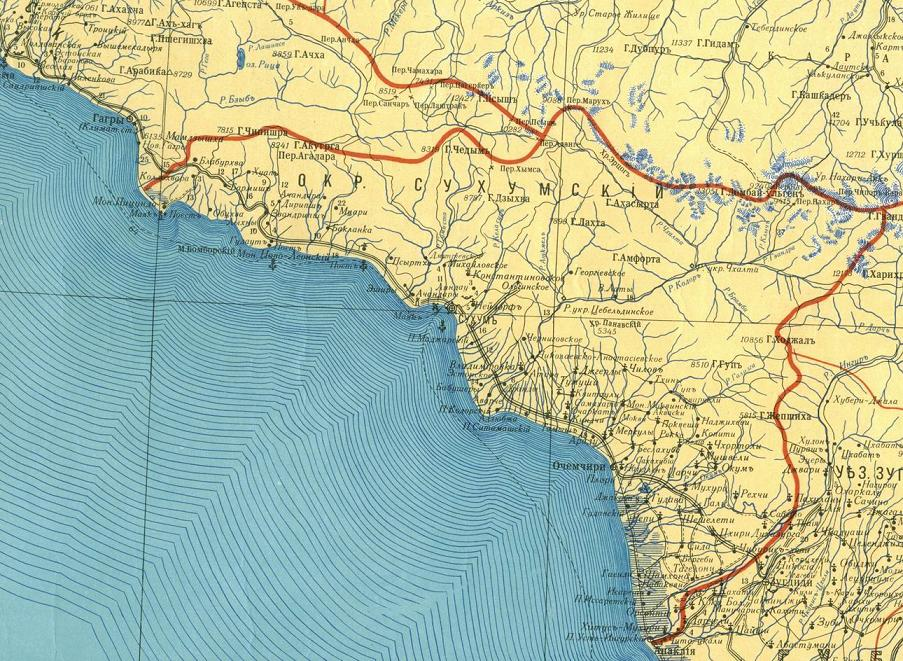
A 1903/04 map of Sukhum okug

Late 19th - early 20th century maps of Abkhazia

Within the Russian Empire, the Georgian territories were initially organised into the Georgia Governorate, then later split off as the Georgia-Imeretia Governorate from 1840–46, and finally divided into the governorates of Tiflis and Kutaisi. The northern border of these territories roughly corresponds with the modern Georgia-Russia border i.e. running along the Caucasus Mountain range. Abkhazia was a semi-autonomous region in 1810, with a border with the Kutaisi Governorate set along the river Ghalizga. In 1864 Abkhazia was re-designated as the 'Sukhum Military District' (from 1883 Sukhum Okrug, within Kutaisi Governorate), incorporating the Samurzakano region west of the Ingur river which had hitherto been part of Kutais governorate and had been disputed between the rulers of Abkhazia and Mingrelia.

Following the 1917 Russian Revolution and the dissolution of the Russian Empire, the Abkhazian Peoples Council (APC) met with Georgian leaders in early 1918, and the two sides made an initial agreement that Abkhazia would constitute Sukhum okrug, including Samurzakano (despite its Mingrelian majority), stretching along the Black Sea coast as far at the river Mzymta. According to the first article of the draft constitution of Abkhazian Autonomy written in 1920, it encompassed the territory from the Mekhadiri River to the Enguri River, and from the Black Sea coast to the Caucasus Mountains.

Map showing the situation in Georgia at the end of 1993. Abkhaz forces were in control of all of the former Abkhaz ASSR, except the upper Kodori Gorge which remained in Georgian hands until the 2008 war with Russia.

After the 1992-1993 war in Abkhazia, the Abkhaz secessionist forces pushed the Georgians out of most of Abkhazia (save for the upper Kodori Gorge) and a ceasefire was arranged in May 1994.

During the 2008 Russo-Georgian War, the Abkhaz secessionist forces, backed by Russia, used the occasion to force Georgia out of the Kodori Gorge, thus gaining full control of all the territory of the former Abkhaz ASSR.

The Abkhaz-Georgian de facto border is currently guarded by the Russian and Abkhaz militaries and has been strengthened since the war, with barbed wire, control towers and other border control infrastructure being built.

== Border crossings ==
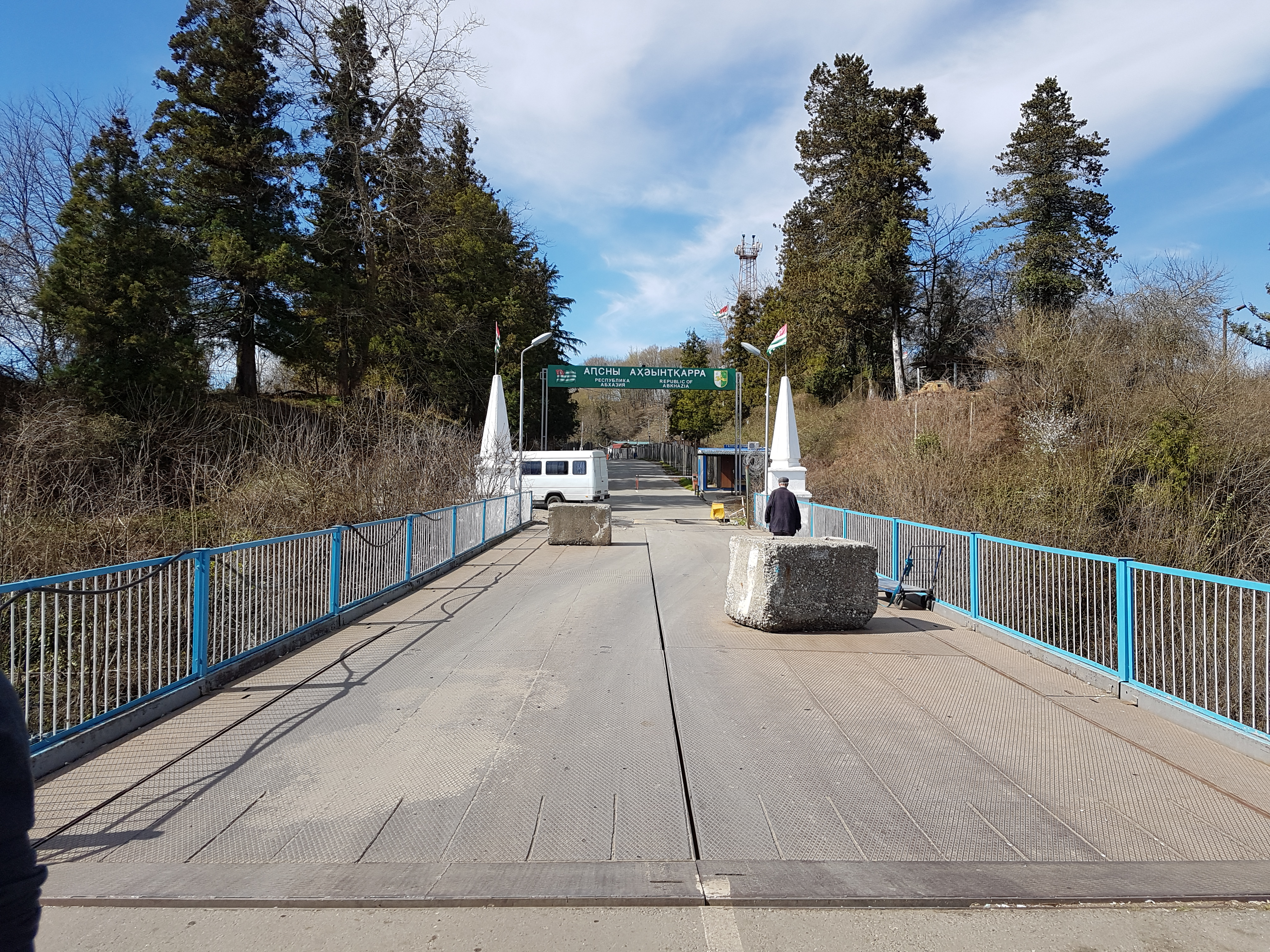
Enguri Bridge over the Enguri river

Currently, only one legal crossing point, at Enguri Bridge over the Enguri river between Gali (Abkhazia) and Zugdidi (Samegrelo) is open. Since the COVID-19 pandemic and Russia's full-scale invasion of Ukraine, attempts by non-locals to enter Abkhazia have been prevented on the Georgian side.

Previously a number of border checkpoints were operating (listed West to East):

Abkhaz side	Georgian side	Status
Nabakia/Nabakevi	Khurcha	closed since 2017
Otobaia	Orsantia	closed since 2017
Taglan/Taglioni	Shamgona	closed since 2016
Khyatskha/Chuburkhinji	Rukhi (Enguri Bridge)	open
Aberkyt	Pakhulani	status unclear
Alakumkhara/Lekukhona	Pakhulani	closed since 2016

== See also ==
- Abkhaz–Georgian conflict
