= Vardnili Hydroelectric Power Station =

Vardnil Hydro Power Plant Cascade
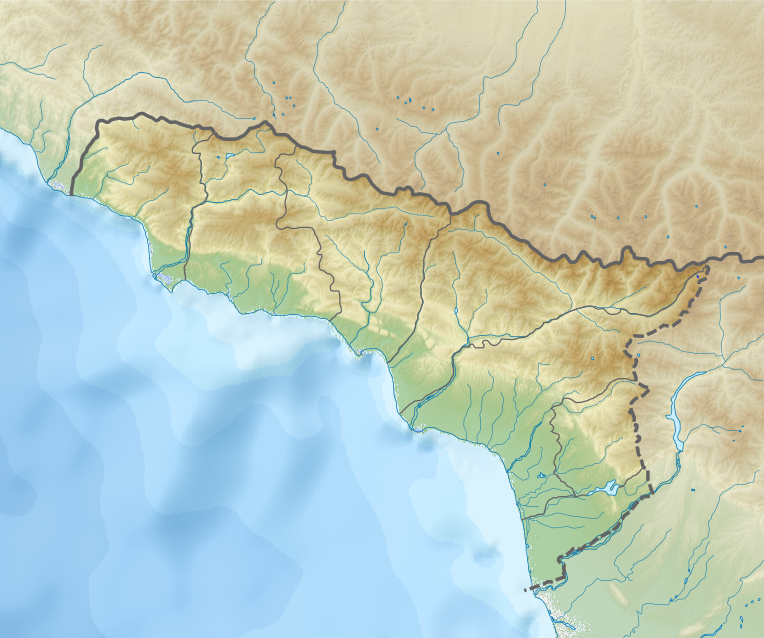
- Location within Abkhazia Location within Georgia
- Country: Abkhazia, Georgia
- Location: Vardnili, Georgia
- Coordinates: 42°39′09″N 41°45′42″E

Reservoir
- Creates: Vardnili

Vardnili Hydroelectric Power Station

Vardnili Hydro Power Plant Cascade (ვარდნილჰესების კასკადი) is a cascade of hydropower plants in the Gali Municipality of Georgia. Included in the Cascade of Enguri Hydropower Plants, it consists of four relatively small power plants (Vardnil HPP-I, Vardnil HPP-II, Vardnil HPP-III, Vardnil HPP-IV). It is built on the outlet channel of the Enguri Hydro Power Plant, by discharging the main runoff of the Enguri River into the Eristskali riverbed. The total projected installed capacity is 340 MW, and the average annual projected electricity output is 1111 million kWh. The Vardnil HPP-I has 3 turbines with a nominal capacity of 73 MW each and a combined capacity of 220 MW.

== See also ==
- List of power stations in Georgia (country)
- Energy in Georgia (country)
