= Samurzakanians =

Ethnographic group of Georgians

Principality of Mingrelia, 15th to 18th centuries

Samurzakanians (Georgian: სამურზაყანოელები, Abkhaz: Myrzaҟanaa, Russian: Самурзаканцы) — a term for the inhabitants of Samurzakano (modern Gali, Tkvarcheli and partially Ochamchire districts) that arose within the Abkhazian princedom and got widely used in the official documents of Russian Empire in the 19th and early 20th centuries, in fact transforming it into an ethnonym. In many ways, this identity was imposed from the government which was facilitated by the administrative policy of the Russian state. Samurzakano was an ethnical contact zone located between the Enguri and Ghalidzga rivers, where already in the 18th century a mixed Abkhaz-Georgian (Abkhaz-Megrelian) population was recorded. Until the 1670s, the region was part of the Principality of Mingrelia, which then was invaded and annexed by the Principality of Abkhazia, causing massive influx of Abkhazian settlers to the newly conquered lands. Compared to the 17th century when according to sources this area was inhabited mainly by Mingrelians, by the 19th century the ethnic composition of the population of Samurzakano had become more complex. The region became bone of contention between the ruling houses of Abkhazia and Megrelia; while the locals were mostly adherents of Georgian Orthodoxy and bilingual in Abkhaz and Mingrelian. Among the eastern Samurzakanians Mingrelian language was dominant, while Abkhazian predominated in the western part. It must be assumed that the majority of the Samurzakanians were Mingrelians, and the minority were Abkhazians.
