= Khudoni Hydro Power Plant =

Khudoni Dam
- Main powerhouse hall of the Khudoni HPP (2023).

- Location within Georgia
- Country: Georgia
- Location: Samegrelo-Zemo Svaneti
- Coordinates: 42°57′17″N 42°11′38″E
- Status: Proposed
- Construction began: 1979

Dam and spillways
- Type of dam: concrete double-arch-gravity dam
- Impounds: Enguri River
- Height: 200.5 m (658 ft)

Power Station
- Turbines: 3 X 233.3 MW
- Installed capacity: 700 MW (max. planned)

Khudoni Hydro Power Plant, hereinafter referred to as Khudoni HPP, (Georgian: ხუდონის ჰიდროელექტროსადგური [ხუდონჰესი], khudonis hidroelektrosadguri [khudonhesi]) is a projected power plant on Enguri River, in Samegrelo-Zemo Svaneti, Georgia that has 3 turbines with a nominal capacity of 233.3 MW each having a total capacity of 700 MW. The power plant is associated with a planned 200.5-metre (658 ft) tall concrete double-arch-gravity dam. According to the Georgian government-commissioned and the World Bank-supported study the construction of Namakhvani, Paravani and Khudoni hydro power plants are the most attractive scenarios for the development of Georgia's energy sector.

== History ==
The construction of the Khudoni HPP started in 1979 and was stopped in 1989 due to collapse of the Soviet Union and protests over environmental concern. It was again blocked by NGOs in the early 1990s. In 2005-2006, the Georgian government started to seek investments to continue the Khudoni HPP. The project was revived in 2005, as Mikheil Saakashvili’s government focused on hydropower in an effort to end constant power outages and to make the country a net exporter of energy. Since 2005 the World Bank has been involved in the negotiations with the Georgian government regarding the Khudoni HPP and it approved a technical assistance grant of USD 5 million.

On 19 September 2013 there was a protest action against the construction of the Khudoni HPP and other large hydro power stations that took place in Tbilisi. It was organized on the initiative of Lasha Chkhartishvili, the author of ecological part of Georgian Dream coalition's pre-election programme, Association of Human Rights Defenders and other non-governmental organisations of Georgia. At the same time there was a public discussion about the impact of the Khudoni HPP construction project on the environment. Protestors in the Svaneti region where the Khudoni HPP will be constructed have stated that they will protest the construction of the hydro power station by all possible means.

== The importance of Khudoni HPP for Georgian electricity production ==
Electricity demand in Georgia has been on the rise since 2009 and investment in new generation capacity is lagging behind. It is produced in either hydropower plants or thermal power plants that burn imported natural gas. In winter, when river levels are relatively low and demand for electricity is high, country has to import more natural gas, resulting in higher prices of electricity. Electricity cuts, especially in winter are common. Khudoni dam would, according to government, accumulate summer excess water and used it to generate additional power during the rest of the year. However, the adequacy of the investments in hydro for the purpose of impeding the electricity shortage in winter has been questioned since Georgia will still have to resort to expensive thermal generation and imports of natural gas in dry winter months. Nevertheless, if compensation measures for loss of biodiversity and cultural heritage are implemented according to international best practice, Khudoni HPP could act as a driver of regional conservation and development.

== Controversial issues ==
=== Cultural heritage ===
Khudoni HPP site is located in Zemo Svaneti (Upper Svaneti) which has been a UNESCO World Heritage Site area since 1996 due to exceptional examples of mountain scenery with medieval-type villages and tower-houses preserved by its long isolation. Local population still lives based on mixture of ancient traditions and Christianity. The Svans, an ethnographic group of the Georgian people, have their own language and traditions, their own architectural styles, and ancient customs which are still a part of everyday life. The environmental and social impact assessment of Khudoni HPP project does not include a detailed description of all the cultural heritage sites, their precise location and stakeholder responses and agreements.

=== Resettlement ===
While project developers stated Khudoni HPP will adhere to World Bank policies and standards on resettlement there are still measures that have to be taken. Khudoni HPP project presupposes resettling around 2000 people which will have a devastating impact on Svans living in the area. So far no resettlement plan was released. Furthermore, the environmental and social impact assessment does not provide any distinction between groups of affected people according to the degree of impact from the project. There is a need to clearly distinct among different groups of affected people and design a tailored made package of livelihood restoration accordingly. Such flaws in procedures for resettlement planning and lack of information have resulted in significant distrust of the population in government and investor.

=== Indigenous Svan Communities ===
On 5 March 2018, representatives of all 17 communities of Upper Svaneti gathered in Mestia for a traditional Svan Council meeting, Lalkhor, to oppose the development of gold mining and hydropower projects in Svaneti that threaten local livelihoods and ecosystems.

The protesters restated their demands – discontinuation of over 50 dam projects, including the Nenskra hydro power plant, Nenskra dams, and the Mestiachala hydropower plant.

The Lalkhor came up with the joint statement and developed a petition addressing the Georgian government, diplomatic missions accredited in Georgia, and international financial institutions.

The Lalkhor demands to recognize Svans as ancient, indigenous, aboriginal, autochthonic people with appropriate rights for customary and community property in Svaneti and to ban development of any infrastructure without their prior consent.

=== Environmental impact ===
Environmentalists remain sceptical about the Khudoni HPP project. The sub-alpine forests and meadows of the upper river Inguri basin is an area well known for its endemic wildlife. The species that are often found here include different forest birds, large raptors and other endemic birds. Mountain goats, chamois, brown bear, wolf, lynx, roe deer and wild boar are also quite common. Flooding of the reservoir area will cause the devastation of forests and wildlife habitat, the loss of river species populations and the degradation of upstream catchments areas. Even though there is no official protected status in Svaneti, the rich biological diversity of the unique area would be irreparably impacted by Khudoni HPP.

==== Cumulative impact ====
Cumulative environmental impact assessment of existing and potential hydro power plants on the Inguri river has been done, but it only includes areas downstream from the proposed Khudoni dam. With more plans to construct hydro power plants on Inguri, the cumulative impact of all of them will result in negative effect on biodiversity and water quality.

=== Lifespan of the reservoir ===
Due to outdated data (measurements from 1966 to 1986 were used) and the fluctuation of the inflow of sediments, inadequate assessment of the lifespan of the reservoir has been made. There is strong evidence that the volume of the sediment inflow is much higher, since the construction of the new 20 km road was not included in the measurements. Furthermore, the slopes around reservoir are unstable which can further shorten the lifespan of the reservoir. There is a need to redo the measurements of sediment inflow and to develop mitigation measures to avoid landslides and rock falls into the reservoir area.

== Photographs ==
Portal of the water-conveyance tunnels

One of the three inclined penstock tunnels leading to the powerhouse

Access adit to the gate chamber

Access adit to the gate chamber

Flooded lower level

One of the three tunnels leading to the gate chamber

Terrain around the Khudoni HPP site

== See also ==
- List of power stations in Georgia (country)
- Energy in Georgia (country)
