= Enguri Bridge =

Coordinates: 42.5814°N 41.8538°E

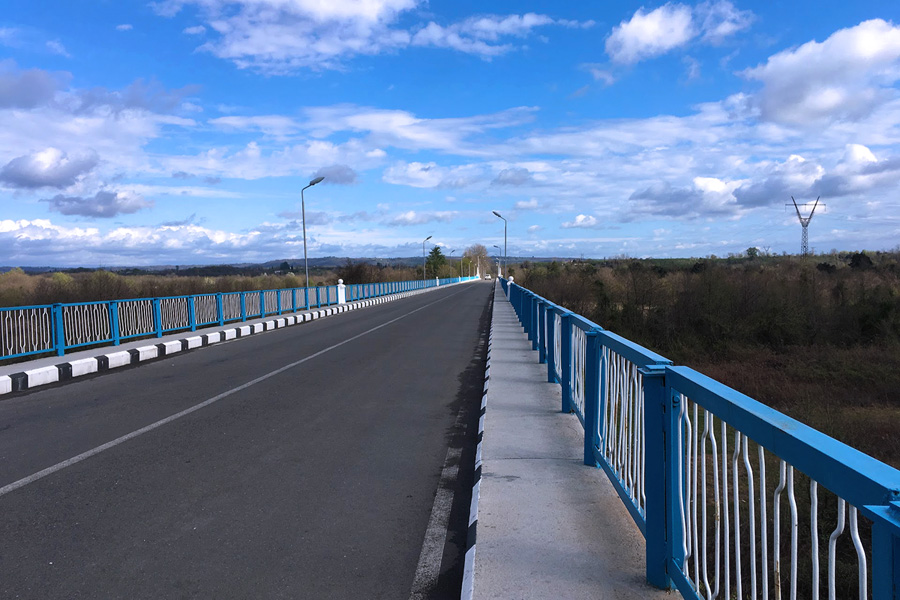
The Enguri bridge

The Enguri Bridge (Georgian: ენგურის ხიდი, Abkhaz Егры ацҳа) is a road bridge across the Enguri river, located on the border of Georgia and the partially recognized Republic of Abkhazia.

== Overview ==
The bridge is 870 meters long and leads from the village of Chuburkhinji in the Gali District of Abkhazia to the village of Rukhi in the Zugdidi Municipality of the Samegrelo-Zemo Svaneti region.

The Shamgona railway bridge—now destroyed—was located somewhat south of the Enguri road bridge.

== Checkpoint ==
The bridge is the only checkpoint between mainland Georgia and Abkhazia, where vehicles can cross.. Crossing the bridge involves passing through three checkpoints: Abkhaz, Russian, and Georgian.

As of 2013, 80% of Abkhaz-Georgian trade passed across the bridge. For residents of the Gali district, crossing the bridge was legal in both directions. There was no inspection of imported goods on the Georgian side.

As of 2013, 5–8 minibuses and 10–20 passenger cars crossed the bridge daily. The bridge was also used by employees of the Enguri HPP. As of 2016, the bridge was used by ambulances to transport patients from Abkhazia to Georgia.

== History ==
The Enguri Bridge was built by German prisoners of war in the Soviet Union between 1944 and 1948.

The bridge was destroyed during the War in Abkhazia (1992–1993) and rebuilt by engineering units of the Russian peacekeeping contingent..

The Inguri Bridge was repaired in 2016. Temporary restrictions on crossing the bridge were imposed in April 2023.
