= Samtskhe–Javakheti Hydro Power Plant =

- Country: Georgia
- Location: Samtskhe–Javakheti

Reservoir
- Creates: Samtskhe–Javakheti

Samtskhe–Javakheti Hydro Power Plant

The Samtskhe–Javakheti Hydro Power Plant is an under-construction power plant in the country of Georgia. It will have two turbines with a nominal capacity of 35 MW each, having a total capacity of 70 MW.

== See also ==
- List of power stations in Georgia (country)
- Energy in Georgia (country)
