= Enguri Dam =

Hydroelectric dam in Tsalenjikha, Georgia

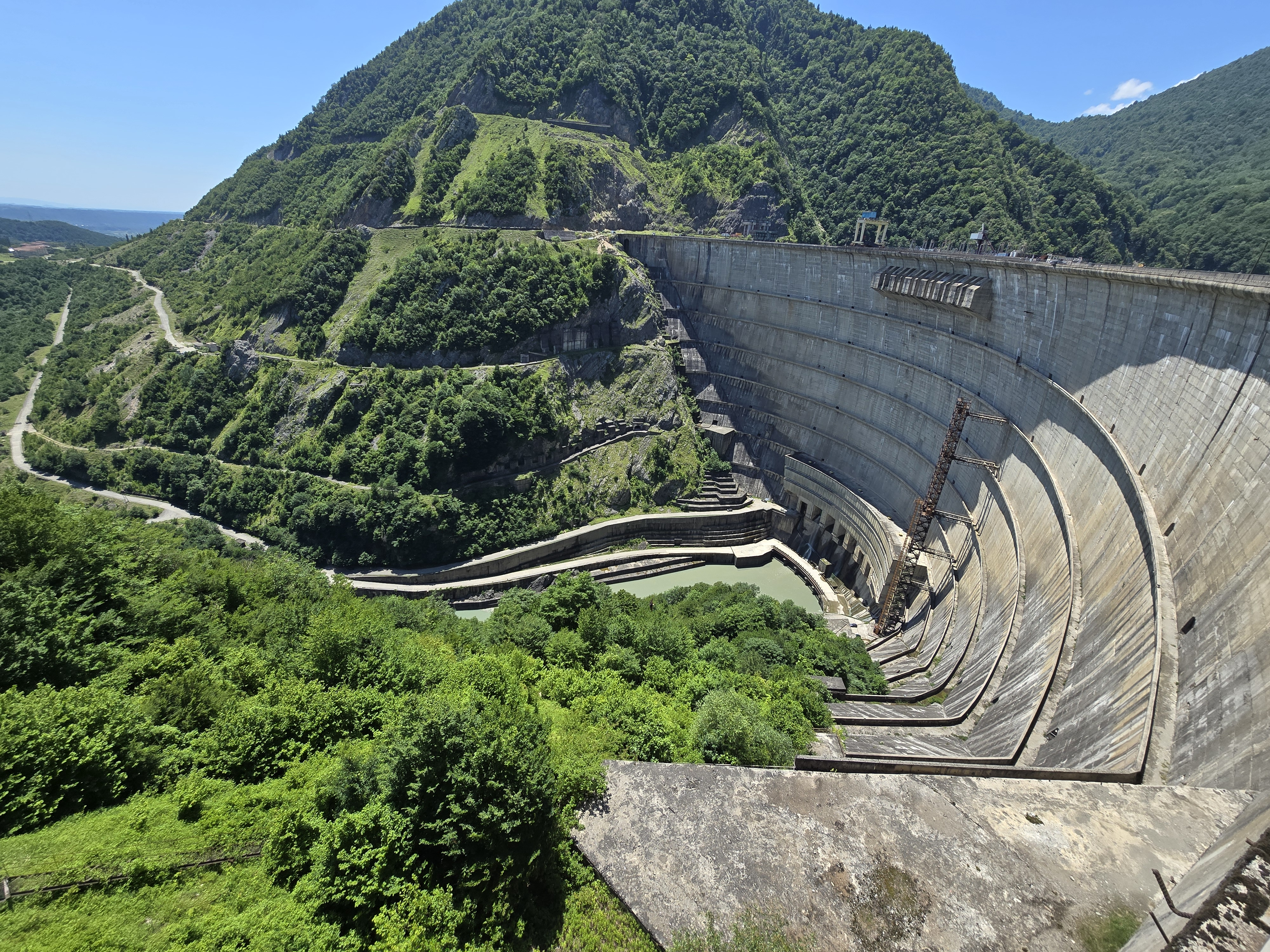
- Enguri dam in 2025

- Location within Georgia Location within Samegrelo-Zemo Svaneti
- Country: Georgia
- Location: Jvari, Tsalenjikha, Samegrelo
- Coordinates: 42°45′33″N 42°01′55″E
- Status: Operational
- Construction began: 1961
- Opening date: 1978
- Owner: Engurhesi Ltd. (Georgian Government)

Dam and spillways
- Type of dam: Arch dam
- Impounds: Enguri River
- Height: 271.5 m (891 ft)

Power Station
- Operator: Ltd. Engurhesi
- Turbines: 5 × 260 MW
- Installed capacity: 1,300 MW
- Annual generation: 4.3 TWh

Immovable Cultural Monument of National Significance of Georgia
- Official name: Enguri arch dam
- Designated: September 4, 2015; 10 years ago
- Item Number in Cultural Heritage Portal: 14738
- Date of entry in the registry: August 31, 2015; 10 years ago

The Enguri Dam is a hydroelectric dam on the Enguri River in Tsalenjikha, Georgia. Currently, it is the world's second highest concrete arch dam, with a height of 271.5 metres (891 ft). It is located north of the town of Jvari. It is part of the Enguri hydroelectric power station (HES) which is partially located in Abkhazia.

== History ==
Soviet First Secretary Nikita Khrushchev initially proposed a major dam and hydroelectric power scheme on the Bzyb River as his favourite resort was located near the mouth of the river at Pitsunda. However, his experts informed him that a dam built on the Bzyb River would have catastrophic effects in causing beach erosion at Pitsunda, so in the end the dam was built on the Enguri River instead, where the impact upon the coastline was assessed to be considerably less pronounced.

Construction of the Enguri dam began in 1961. The dam became temporarily operational in 1978, and was completed in 1987. In 1994, engineers from Hydro-Québec inspected the dam and found it to be "in a rare state of dilapidation". In 1999, the European Commission granted €9.4 million to Georgia for urgent repairs at the Enguri HES, including replacing the stoplog at the arch dam on the Georgian side and, refurbishing one of the five generators of the power station at the Abkhaz side. In total, €116 million loans were granted by the EBRD, the European Union, the Japanese Government, KfW and the Government of Georgia. In 2011 the European Investment Bank (EIB) loaned €20 million in order to complete the rehabilitation of the Enguri hydropower plant and to ensure safe water evacuation towards the Black Sea at the Vardnili hydropower cascade.

In the early 1980s, a series of radio relays were built to connect the Enguri Dam with the Khudoni Dam, which was under construction. The relays were in remote territory with no access to electricity, and thus were powered with a series of eight radioisotope thermoelectric generators (RTGs). However, the Hudoni dam's construction was stopped as Georgian independence from the Soviet Union drew near. The stations and their RTGs were abandoned and eventually dismantled. The RTG's became lost at this time. Two were rediscovered in 1998, leading to no injuries. Two more were found in 1999, and again led to no injuries or significant radiation exposure. Two more were rediscovered in 2001, which led to the Lia radiological accident. The other two sources remain unaccounted for.

== Technical features ==
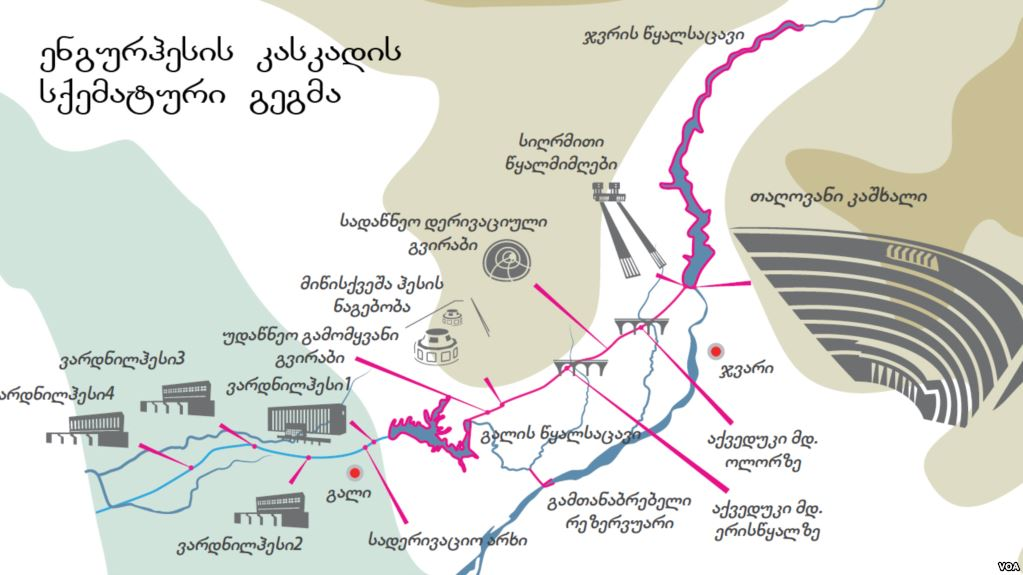
Distribution of the Enguri HES facilities in Abkhazia and Georgia proper

The Enguri hydroelectric power station (HES) is a cascade of hydroelectric facilities including, in addition to the dam - diversion installation of the Enguri HES proper, the near-dam installation of the Perepad HES-1 and three similar channel installations of the Perepad HESs-2, -3, and -4 located on the tailrace emptying into the Black Sea. While the arch dam is located on the Georgian controlled territory in Upper Svanetia, the power station is located in the Gali District of breakaway Abkhazia. Enguri HES has 20 turbines with a nominal capacity of 66 MW each, resulting in a total capacity of 1,320 MW. Its average annual capacity is 3.8 TWh, which is approximately 46% of the total electricity supply in Georgia as of 2007. According to the 1992 agreement Abkhazia gets 40% and the rest of Georgia gets 60%, however in the late 2010s the Abkhazian consumption increased significantly driven in part by bitcoin mining.

The facility's arched dam, located at the town of Jvari, was inscribed in the list of cultural heritage of Georgia in 2015.

== See also ==
- List of power stations in Georgia (country)
- Energy in Georgia (country)
- Vardnili Hydroelectric Power Station, connected to the Enguri complex
