= Dikhazurga Saint Barbara Church =

Ruined medieval church at the village of Dikhazurga in the Gali district of Abkhazia

Dikhazurga Saint Barbara Church დიხაზურგის წმინდა ბარბარეს ეკლესია (in Georgian)
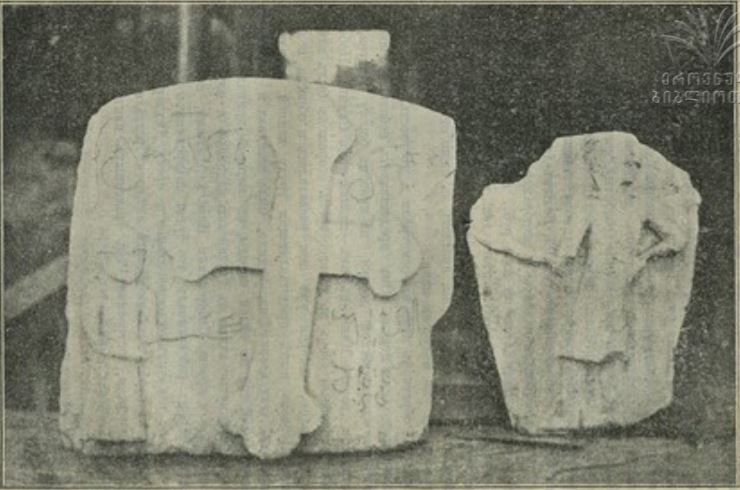
- The Dikhazurga plaque (Janashvili, 1907)

- Location within Abkhazia Location within Georgia

Religion
- Affiliation: Georgian Orthodox
- District: Gali district
- Province: Abkhazia

Location
- Location: (Georgia (country)) Dikhazurga, Gali district, Abkhazia, Georgia
- Interactive map of Dikhazurga Saint Barbara Church დიხაზურგის წმინდა ბარბარეს ეკლესია (in Georgian)
- Coordinates: 42°37′08″N 41°50′53″E

Architecture
- Type: Church

The Dikhazurga church of Saint Barbara (Georgian: დიხაზურგის წმინდა ბარბარეს ეკლესია, Abkhaz: Дихазургатәи Барбара ацқьа луахәама) is a ruined medieval church at the village of Dikhazurga in the Gali district of Abkhazia, an entity in the South Caucasus with a disputed political status.

== History ==
The ruins were first described in 1907 by the historian Mose Janashvili, sent by the Caucasus Division of the Moscow Imperial Archaeological Society in response to an incidental find of an old Georgian stone inscription in the vicinity. The ruins of a hall-church-type chapel, traditionally held to have been built in honor of Saint Barbara, lie in the historical district of Samurzakano, on the right bank of the Enguri River, in what was an estate of the nobleman Mikia at the time of Janashvili's visit. By that time, the church had already been reduced to a pile of white limestone blocks. A white limestone plaque discovered there bears an image, carved in relief, of a man who is turned in supplication towards the cross. Above this scene there is a Georgian inscription, carved in the mkhedruli script and paleographically dated to the 11th century, making it one of the earliest specimens of this latest version of the Georgian alphabet. The text mentions "Gregory, the chief mason" (გრიგოლ გალატოზთუხუცესი).
