= Zhoneti Hydro Power Plant =

Proposed hydroelectric power plant in Zhoneti, Georgia

- Location within Imereti Location within Georgia
- Official name: ჟონეთი
- Country: Georgia
- Location: Zhoneti, Georgia
- Coordinates: 42°22′19″N 42°41′31″E

Reservoir
- Creates: Zhoneti

Zhoneti Hydro Power Plant

Zhoneti Hydro Power Plant is a proposed power plant in village Zhoneti, Georgia with two turbines having a nominal capacity of 55 MW each for a total capacity of 110 MW.

== See also ==
- List of power stations in Georgia (country)
- Energy in Georgia (country)
