= Megobroba Saint George Church =

Church in Chuburkhinji, Abkhazia, Georgia

Megobroba Saint George Church მეგობრობის წმინდა გიორგის ეკლესია (in Georgian)
- Location within Abkhazia Location within Georgia

Religion
- Affiliation: Georgian Orthodox
- District: Gali Municipality
- Province: Abkhazia

Location
- Location: (Georgia (country)) Chuburkhinji, Gali Municipality, Abkhazia, Georgia
- Interactive map of Megobroba Saint George Church მეგობრობის წმინდა გიორგის ეკლესია (in Georgian)
- Coordinates: 42°35′09″N 41°48′55″E

Architecture
- Type: Church
- Completed: Middle Ages

Megobroba Saint George Church (Georgian: მეგობრობის წმინდა გიორგის ეკლესია) is a church in the village of Chuburkhinji, Gali municipality, Autonomous Republic of Abkhazia, Georgia.

== History ==
The church was built in the late Middle Ages.
