= Namakhvani Hydro Power Plant =

- Location within Imereti Location within Georgia
- Country: Georgia
- Location: Namakhyani, Georgia
- Coordinates: 42°25′11″N 42°42′10″E

Reservoir
- Creates: Namakhvani

Namakhvani Hydro Power Plant

Namakhvani Hydro Power Plant (Georgian: ნამოხვანი) will be a large power plant to be built in the Tskaltubo and Tsageri municipalities north of Kutaisi, Imereti region, Georgia and will have five turbines with a nominal capacity of 50 MW each having a total capacity of 250 MW.

Local population has concerns about safety of this dam.

== See also ==
- List of power stations in Georgia (country)
- Energy in Georgia (country)
