= Chuburkhinji Saint George Church =

Church building in Chuburkhinji, Georgia

Chuburkhinji Saint George Church ჭუბურხინჯის წმინდა გიორგის ეკლესია (in Georgian)
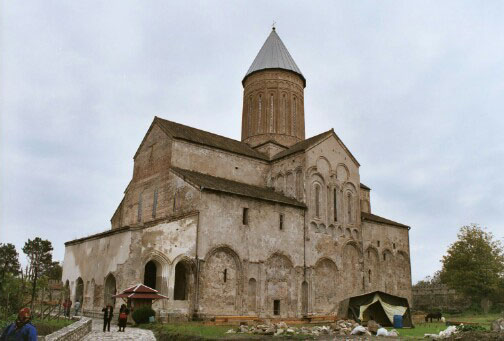

- Location within Abkhazia Location within Georgia

Religion
- Affiliation: Georgian Orthodox
- Province: Abkhazia

Location
- Location: (Georgia (country)) Chuburkhinji, Gali Municipality, Abkhazia, Georgia
- Interactive map of Chuburkhinji Saint George Church ჭუბურხინჯის წმინდა გიორგის ეკლესია (in Georgian)
- Coordinates: 42°34′50″N 41°48′35″E

Architecture
- Type: Church
- Completed: 19th century

Chuburkhinji Saint George Church (Georgian: ჭუბურხინჯის წმინდა გიორგის ეკლესია) is a church in the village of Chuburkhinji, Gali Municipality, Autonomous Republic of Abkhazia, Georgia.

== History ==
The church was built in the 19th century. The original building was built in the 11th century, but in the second half of the 19th century, with the parish's initiative, the church was reconstructed and consecrated in the name of Saint Elijah the Prophet. But the local population still calls it the Saint George church. When observing the façade of the church, it's easy to notice certain elements that characterize the 11th century Georgian architecture.
