= Kvemo Barghebi =

Kvemo Barghebi Georgian: ქვემო ბარღები Abkhaz: Аладаҭәы Барҕьаҧ
- Location within Georgia Location within Abkhazia
- Coordinates: 42°33′35″N 41°37′15″E
- Country: Georgia
- Partially recognized independent country: Abkhazia
- District: Gali

Population (2011)
  - Total: 1,677
- Time zone: UTC+3 (MSK)
  - Summer (DST): UTC+4

Kvemo Barghebi (Georgian: ქვემო ბარღები; Abkhaz: Аладаҭәы Барҕьаҧ) is a village in Gali Municipality of Georgia. As is the case in the rest of the district its population is almost exclusively Georgian.

== History ==
In March 1995, the Abkhaz militias from the neighboring Ochamchire District raided Kvemo Barghebi, beat prisoners with rods, burned them with hot knives and bayonets, stabbed them and set their bodies on fire. The Abkhaz militia killed 28 persons, most of whom were tortured to death. In the following years, the Amnesty International and Georgia's Ombudsman's office accused the Abkhaz militia of several arbitrary detentions of ethnic Georgian villagers and other human rights abuses.

In 2007, the head of the village, ethnic Georgian Fridon Chakaberia was arrested by Georgian authorities when he came to Zugdidi, charged with trafficking of drugs and sentenced to 10 years of prison. According to the Georgian opposition TV channel Imedi Chakaberia was convicted only because he was an official of the Abkhazian government. Abkhazian officials also denied that he was guilty of any crimes and maintained that he was a political prisoner. Higher Georgian court later changed his sentence to 5 years probation and Chakaberia was able to return to Abkhazia and assume his duties.

== See also ==
- Gali Municipality
- Gali District
