= Energy in Georgia =

Energy in Georgia may refer to:

- Energy in Georgia (country)
- Energy in Georgia (U.S. state)
