= Bebesiri =

Coordinates: 42°41′06″N 41°35′02″E

- ბებესირი
- Location within Georgia
- Location: Gali Municipality, Abkhazia, Georgia
- Type: Lake

Bebesiri (Georgian: ბებესირი) is a lake in Georgia, located in the Gali municipality in Abkhazia. It is located on the right side of Okumi River, 15.9 m above sea level. The surface area is 0.14 km^{2}, the basin area is 0.82 km^{2}, and the maximum depth is 4.6 m. It arose as a result of the confluence of rivers with coastal dunes. It is nourished by rain and underground water. A large part of the surface is covered with algae. It is rich in fish.
