= Gudava Saint Barbara Church =

Medieval church in the village of Second Gudava, Abkhazia

Gudava Saint Barbara Church გუდავის წმინდა ბარბარეს ეკლესია (in Georgian) Гәдаатәи Барбара ацқьа луахәама (in Abkhaz)
- Location within Abkhazia Location within Georgia

Religion
- Affiliation: Georgian Orthodox
- District: Gali Municipality
- Province: Abkhazia
- Ecclesiastical or organizational status: ruins

Location
- Location: Gali Municipality, Abkhazia, Georgia
- Interactive map of Gudava Saint Barbara Church გუდავის წმინდა ბარბარეს ეკლესია (in Georgian); Гәдаатәи Барбара ацқьа луахәама (in Abkhaz)
- Coordinates: 42°35′40″N 41°31′15″E

Architecture
- Type: Church
- Completed: 6-7th century

The Gudava church of Saint Barbara (Georgian: გუდავის წმინდა ბარბარეს ეკლესია, Abkhaz: Гәдаатәи Барбара ацқьа луахәама ) is a medieval church in the village of Second Gudava in Gali Municipality what is now Abkhazia, an entity in the South Caucasus with a disputed political status. It is located near the estuary of the Okumi river in the historical district of Samurzakano in southeastern Abkhazia.

== History ==
The first church in this location existed in the 6th-7th century. The extant monument is a hall church, probably dated to the 15th or 16th-century. A stone plaque found at the church and now preserved in the National Museum of Georgia in Tbilisi, bears the medieval Georgian inscription in an asomtavruli script, making mention of a certain Rabay and his wife, Nugamtsira. The church probably stands on the site of an earlier place of worship, once an episcopal seat, which is mentioned by the medieval Georgian chronicles as Gudaqva, abolished by the early 11th-century monarch Bagrat III of Georgia. This is identified in modern scholarship with the Ziganeos of the Eastern Roman sources, one of the suffragan dioceses of the metropolitan see of Lazica. The remains of a Byzantine cathedral have not been discovered, but a 4th-5th-century rectangular baptistery with a protruding apse as well as remnants of a Roman fortified wall was unearthed in the village by a Georgian archaeological expedition led by Parmen Zakaraia between 1965 and 1972.
