= Kulevi Oil Refinery =

Oil refinery under development in Georgia

- Location: Kulevi, Georgia

Refinery details
- Opened: Under construction (est. 2025 start)
- Capacity: 22,000 barrels per day (initial)

Kulevi Oil Refinery is an oil refinery under development near the Kulevi oil terminal on Georgia's Black Sea coast. The refinery is expected to become Georgia's first facility for domestic crude oil processing, with an aim to reduce the country's reliance on imported refined fuels.

Its role in circumventing international sanctions against Russian oil is documented and criticized, with the EU eventually imposing sanctions against the refinery in July 2026.

== Background ==
The refinery project was announced in 2023 and is being constructed in proximity to the Kulevi oil terminal in western Georgia. The initiative was presented by the Prime Minister of Georgia as one of the largest private investments in the country's history, with a projected cost of $700 million.

== Project details ==
The refinery is designed to process 1.121 million metric tons of crude oil annually in its first phase (approximately 22,000 barrels per day), with planned expansion to 2.9 million metric tons per year in a second phase.

== Purpose and strategic importance ==
The refinery aims to:

- Increase Georgia's energy security
- Provide regional fuel supply capabilities
- Support local employment and industrial development

Government officials have stated that the project could play a critical role in diversifying energy imports and improving infrastructure for the energy sector.

== Circumvention of sanctions ==
The role of the refinery in circumventing sanctions against Russian oil by allowing Russian crude oil to be processed outside the country is documented and criticized. In July 2026, the European Union adopted sanctions, including a transaction ban, against the refinery, which was still buying Russian oil.

== Construction timeline ==
The refinery broke ground in 2023. According to public statements, the facility is expected to begin operations by the first half of 2025.

== See also ==
- Energy in Georgia (country)
- Oil refining
