= Ghumurishi Church =

Eastern Orthodox church in Gaili, Georgia

Ghumurishi Church ღუმურიშის ეკლესია (in Georgian) Ӷумуришьтәи ауахәама (in Abkhaz)
- Location within Abkhazia Location within Georgia

Religion
- Affiliation: Georgian Orthodox
- Province: Abkhazia

Location
- Location: (Georgia (country)) Ghumurishi, Gali Municipality, Abkhazia, Georgia
- Interactive map of Ghumurishi Church ღუმურიშის ეკლესია (in Georgian); Ӷумуришьтәи ауахәама (in Abkhaz)
- Coordinates: 42°42′50″N 41°47′20″E

Architecture
- Type: Church
- Completed: 19th century

Ghumurishi Church (Georgian: ღუმურიშის ეკლესია; Abkhaz: Ӷумуришьтәи ауахәама) of St. John the Baptist is a 19th-century Eastern Orthodox church on left bank of Okumi river in the village of Zemo Ghumurishi, north of the town of Gali, in Abkhazia, a breakaway region of Georgia. The locale is part of the historical district of Samurzakano. Not to be confused with Ghumurishi Sagergaio Church built in the first half of the 11th century and rebuilt in the 19th century in the same village.

== History ==
The church is a hall-church design, built from 1888 to 1889. It is built of coarsely cut rubble stone and white rectangular limestone slabs. The floor was also once faced with similar slabs, but only its portion survives at the sanctuary. A belfry, now in ruins, is attached to the west wall of the church. The apse is covered with a simple dome-like roof and is pierced with three arched windows. A pair of similar windows is found each, on the southern and northern walls. Some 3 km northwest of the village are the ruins of a medieval site of Christian worship known as Sagergaio.
