= Ghumurishi Sagergaio Church =

Ruined medieval church near Ghumurishi, Abkhazia, Georgia

Ghumurishi Sagergaio Church ღუმურიშის (საგერგაიოს) ეკლესია (in Georgian) Ӷумуришьтәи (Сагергаотәи) ауахәама (in Abkhaz)
- Location within Abkhazia Location within Georgia

Religion
- Affiliation: Georgian Orthodox
- Province: Abkhazia

Location
- Location: Ghumurishi, Gali Municipality, Abkhazia, Georgia
- Interactive map of Ghumurishi Sagergaio Church ღუმურიშის (საგერგაიოს) ეკლესია (in Georgian); Ӷумуришьтәи (Сагергаотәи) ауахәама (in Abkhaz)
- Coordinates: 42°42′25″N 41°45′35″E

Architecture
- Type: Church
- Completed: 11th century

Ghumurishi Sagergaio Church (Georgian: ღუმურიშის (საგერგაიოს) ეკლესია; Abkhaz: Ӷумуришьтәи (Сагергаотәи) ауахәама) is a ruined medieval church built in the first half of the 11th century and rebuilt in the 19th century near the village of Ghumurishi in Abkhazia, an entity in the South Caucasus with a disputed political status. It is located 3 km north-west of the village, on a small mountainous plateau locally known as Sagergaio on the right bank of the Okumi river, north of the town of Gali. The locale is part of the historical district of Samurzakano. Not to be confused with Ghumurishi Church of St. John the Baptist built in the 19th century in the same village.

== History ==
The site was brought to scholarly attention with the discovery of a medieval Georgian stone inscription in 1955 and archaeologically studied from 1986 to 1989. Archaeological digs unearthed two construction layers, the upper one completely covered with foliage, with roots going down to the ceiling. It is what remains of a possibly 15th-16th-century small hall church, measuring 4.5 m x 7.5 m. This church had a courtyard which housed several pit graves and was enclosed with a wall. The lower layer was buried in debris and occupied by remnants of a single-nave hall-church-type edifice with the dimensions of 12 x 14 m. The hall had a rectangular plan, with an eastern apse inscribed in it and had its interior divided into two with a stepped pilasters. Fragments of ornate wall masonry were also found in this layer. The church was finally abandoned and fell into ruin in the 17th century. It does not appear either in historical records or popular memory.

Not far from the ruins, a Georgian inscription, cut in stone in medieval asomtavruli script, was found in 1955 and brought to a museum in Sukhumi. Paleographically dated to the 11th century, it reads: "God, have mercy in both lives upon the builder of this church, the Queen of Queens, Sagdukht, daughter of Niania. Amen!" The identity of Sagdukht remains obscure.
