= Jvari (town) =

Jvari ჯვარი
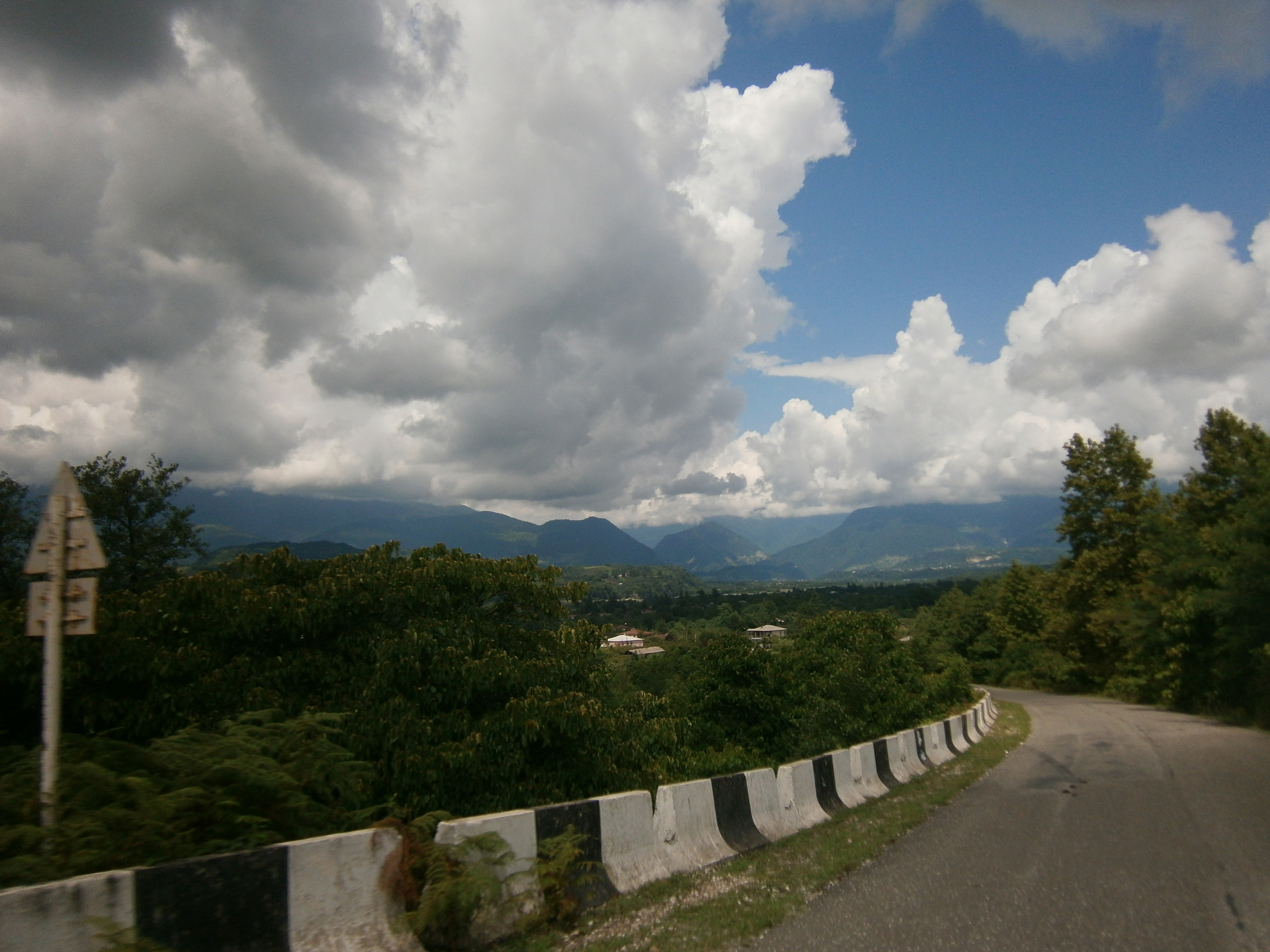

- Location of Jvari in Georgia Jvari (Samegrelo-Zemo Svaneti)
- Coordinates: 42°43′03″N 42°03′03″E
- Country: Georgia
- Region: Samegrelo-Zemo Svaneti
- District: Tsalenjikha
- Elevation: 280 m (920 ft)

Population (2024)
  - Total: 3,185
- Time zone: UTC+4 (Georgian Time)

Jvari (Georgian: ჯვარი) is a town in the northwestern Georgian province of Samegrelo-Zemo Svaneti. The town is situated at an altitude of 280 metres near the Magana River where it flows into the Enguri River; The town is divided in two with "Jvari" lying on the Zugdidi-Mestia highway, and Jvarzeni (Upper Jvari) up the hill.

== Etymology ==
In Georgian the word "Jvari" means "cross". There are three legends about where this name came from.

- The first legend is connected to St Andrew who was Jesus Christ's pupil. After Christ's crucifixion his pupils began spreading Christianity all around the world. St Andrew had to convert to Christianity in Georgia, so one day he came to Jvari from Abkhazia. He preached Christianity and after that he christened the people in Enguri River. He drove a cross into the ground and people named this territory 'Jvari'.
- The second legend says that the Queen of Georgia, Tamara, was in Jvari in the 12th century. As she was walking she saw two rivers, the Enguri and the Magana, crossing each other and forming the shape of a cross. Queen Tamara exclaimed "Look! Jvari, Jvari!" That is why the territory was named Jvari.
- According to the third legend, when Queen Tamara visited the village she lost her golden cross. She was looking for the cross with her retinue. After she found it she cried "Jvari, Jvari!" and named this territory Jvari.

== Description ==
Jvari is located in the far northwest of Georgia, at the beginning of the Mestia highway through the mountains, which provides the rest of Georgia with access to Svaneti. Jvari is a very old settlement in the north-west of Georgia in the Tsalenjikha municipality. According to the legends we can suppose that Jvari has a 2,000 year old history.

Nearby Jvari is the Enguri Dam, which is an important part of Jvari's economy. The dam provides 46% of all electricity consumed in Georgia.

There are three schools, a vocational college and a community centre funded by a German organisation. The first school in Jvari opened in 1888. Its founder and first teacher was a priest named Bede Getia. The school didn't have its own building, just a single room. In 1907 a wooden 8-room building was constructed, but this burned down on 31 August 1930. Construction of a new school began in 1934.

In 1949 many Jvari residents left to Abkhazia under instruction by the Georgian government. Then in 1992 the Russian war in Abkhazia started and around 10,000 refugees came to the Enguri area.

It was the hometown of Meliton Kantaria, the sergeant of the Soviet Army, who was photographed hoisting a Soviet flag Banner of Victory over the Reichstag following the final defeat of Nazi Germany.

== See also ==
- Samegrelo-Zemo Svaneti
