= Pichori church =

Church in Abkhazia, Georgia

Pichori church ფიჩორის ეკლესია (in Georgian)
- Location within Abkhazia Location within Georgia

Religion
- Affiliation: Georgian Orthodox
- District: Gali Municipality
- Province: Abkhazia

Location
- Location: (Georgia (country)) Pichori, Gali Municipality, Abkhazia, Georgia
- Interactive map of Pichori church ფიჩორის ეკლესია (in Georgian)
- Coordinates: 42°26′51″N 41°34′01″E

Architecture
- Type: Church
- Completed: Middle Ages

The Pichori Church (Georgian: ფიჩორის ეკლესია) is located in the village of Pichori, Gali Municipality, Autonomous Republic of Abkhazia, Georgia.

== History ==
The church is built in the Middle Ages. Currently the area is occupied by Russia, which is why it is impossible to study the church and perform appropriate works.
