= Tsarche =

Tsarche Georgian: წარჩე, Abkhaz: Ҵарча
- village
- Tsarche Tsarche (Abkhazia)
- Coordinates: 42°41′50″N 41°40′14″E
- Country: Georgia
- Partially recognized independent country: Abkhazia
- District: Gali
- Time zone: UTC+3 (MSK)
  - Summer (DST): UTC+4

Tsarche (Georgian: წარჩე; Abkhaz: Ҵарча) is a village in Gali District, Abkhazia, Georgia. It is located 17 km from Gali on the Samurzakano plain between rivers Okumi and Tsarche.

== History ==
Tsarche's name probably comes from two Megrelian words “tsar" meaning "water", and “che”, meaning "white", hence "White Water".

References to the village can be found in antiquity. Arrian (Arrian of Nicomedia) mentioned the river “Tarsura” and the town “Tarshen” on its side. Arkanjelo Lamberti wrote in the 17th century of Heta and after it Okumi which passes along Tarshen, where “Tarshen” is the same as “Tsarche”, but foreigners pronounced it differently. In 1654, The name "Tsarche" also appears on the map of Colchi (Samegrelo).

The architectural monuments in the village confirm Tsarche's political and cultural importance in the North West of Georgia. According to Nodar Shonia, there are 23 historical monuments in Tsarche, including the Church of Epiphany, Tsarche's church of “Picheriste”, and two churches of so-called “Mapash Okhuame” (this means the tomb of the king in Megrelian). There were four ancient libraries too, but none exist now.

“Mapash Okhuame” was built in the 13th-14th centuries is the architectural complex. The complex includes two churches, a fence, and a piece of gate. During the archaeological works in one of the churches there were found frescos of local nobles. I. Shervashidze thinks that these churches were built in the 15th century. Churches in Tsarche were renewed by Samegrelo's ruler Levan II Dadiani in the 17th century (1611–1657).

During the archaeological works in one of the churches there was found writing in ancient Georgian Nuskhuri and there was name of someone Pashadze. Locals call "Pashadze’s Mountain" one of the mountains close to Tsarche village.

== See also ==
- Tsarche fortress
- Gali Municipality
- Gali District
