= Mulkhra =

Mulkhra Mulkhura
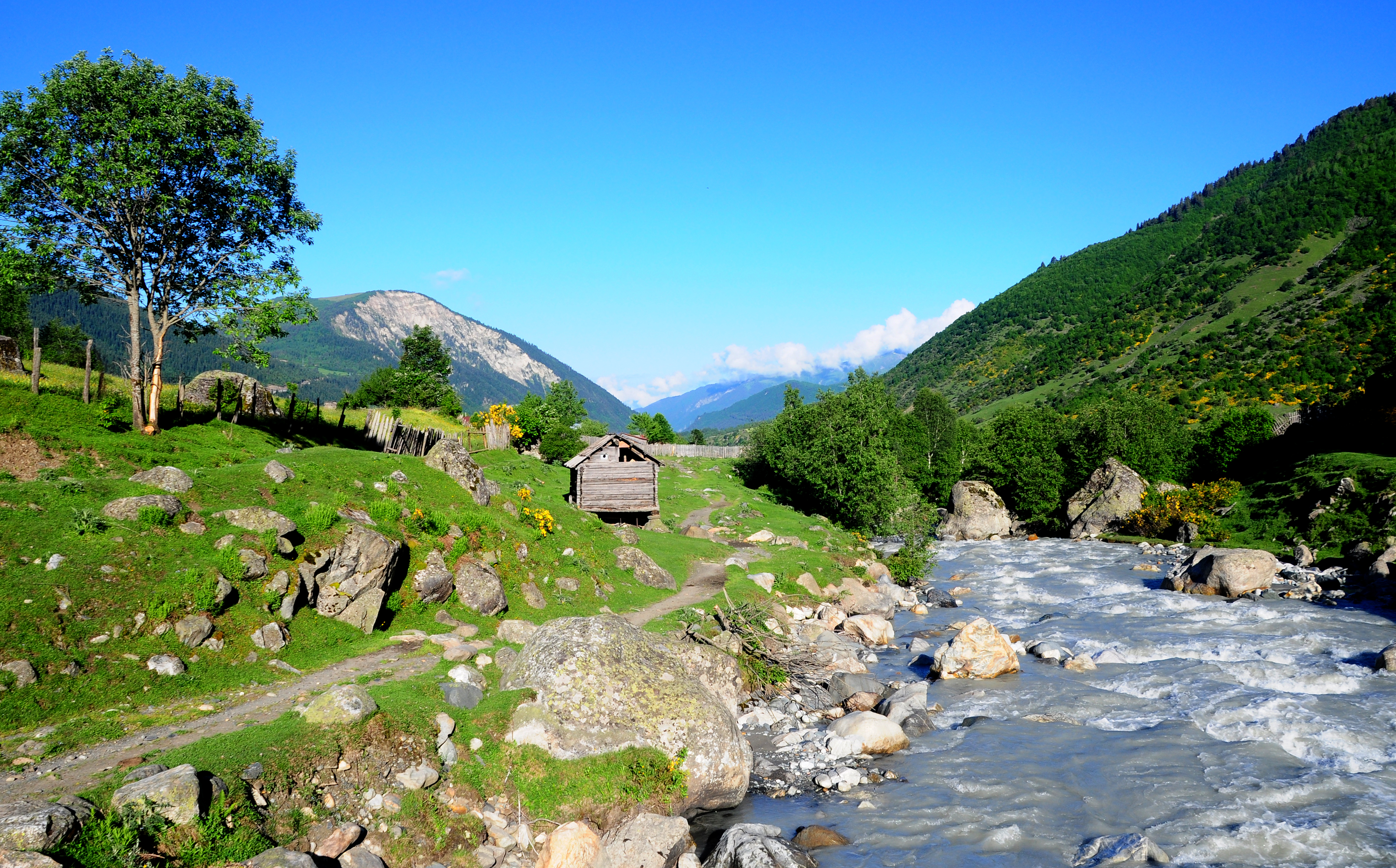
- Mulkhra river near Tetnuldi

- Location within Samegrelo-Zemo Svaneti Location within Georgia
- Native name: მულხრა (Georgian)

Location
- Country: Georgia
- Region: Caucasus

Physical characteristics
- Source: Lesser Caucasus
  - location: Georgia
- Mouth: Enguri
  - coordinates: 43°00′16″N 42°37′41″E
- Length: 27 km (17 mi)

Basin features
- Progression: Enguri→ Black Sea

The Mulkhra or Mulkhura (Georgian: მულხრა, მულხურა) is a river in Mestia Municipality, Georgia, right tributary of the Enguri. It is located in the region Samegrelo-Zemo Svaneti, in the northwestern part of the country, 230 km (140 mi) northwest of the capital Tbilisi. Length 27 km (17 mi), basin area 435 km^{2} (168 sq mi).

It originates on the southern slope of the Svaneti Caucasus main ridge, on the Tviberi Glacier and joins the Enguri River near the village Kvanchianari. Mulkhura feeds on glaciers, snow, rain and groundwater. Floods are known from April to October, and water shortages - from October to April, from late November to late March - on the ice and in Toshi. The average annual flow at the confluence is 22.5 m^{3}/s (790 cu ft/s).
