= Gali District =

Gali District may refer to:

- Gali District, Abkhazia (Republic of Abkhazia, independence dispute)
- Gali Municipality (Autonomous Republic of Abkhazia within Georgia)
Gali District, Abkhazia

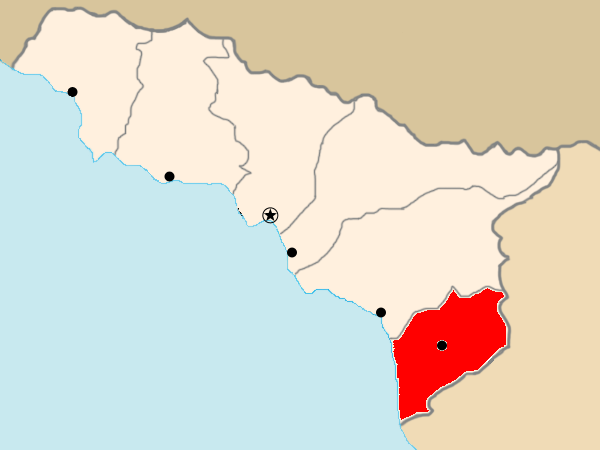
Gali Municipality
