= Chkhortoli Church =

Church building in Abkhazia, Georgia

Chkhortoli Church (XI-XIX Centuries) ჩხორთოლის ეკლესია (XI-XIX საუკუნეები) (in Georgian)
- Location within Abkhazia Location within Georgia

Religion
- Affiliation: Georgian Orthodox
- Province: Abkhazia
- Ecclesiastical or organizational status: ruins

Location
- Location: (Georgia (country)) Chkhortoli, Gali Municipality, Abkhazia, Georgia
- Interactive map of Chkhortoli Church (XI-XIX Centuries) ჩხორთოლის ეკლესია (XI-XIX საუკუნეები) (in Georgian)
- Coordinates: 42°44′00″N 41°42′45″E

Architecture
- Type: Church
- Completed: 11-19th century

Chkhortoli Church (XI-XIX centuries) (Georgian: ჩხორთოლის ეკლესია (XI-XIX საუკუნეები)) is a church on right bank of Chkhortoli river in the village of Chkhortoli, Gali Municipality, Autonomous Republic of Abkhazia, Georgia.

== History ==
The church was built in the 11th-13th centuries. The construction represents an 18th-19th century hall church with an old, 11th century foundation and an overhanging apse. The church has a gate on the western side. The upper part of the gate represents a big arch open both from the façade and the church's inner part. Three large windows are located in the altar. An arched niche is on the northern side of the altar. Southern and northern walls also have windows. The western door is arched-shaped and other doors have a rectangular shape. The interior walls have two arches that are situated on a standing out sharp pilaster. The pilasters end with decorated (ornamented) capitals. The church roofing is totally demolished. All walls are on the same level and there is no sign of a vault. Apparently, the church had a girder roofing.
