= Nabakevi Church =

Church in Gali, Republic of Abkhazia

Nabakevi Church ნაბაკევის ეკლესია (in Georgian)
- Location within Abkhazia Location within Georgia

Religion
- Affiliation: Georgian Orthodox
- Province: Abkhazia

Location
- Location: (Georgia (country)) Bataiguara (Nabakevi), Gali municipality, Abkhazia, Georgia
- Interactive map of Nabakevi Church ნაბაკევის ეკლესია (in Georgian)
- Coordinates: 42°30′35″N 41°41′20″E

Architecture
- Type: Church
- Completed: Middle Ages

Nabakevi Church (Georgian: ნაბაკევის ეკლესია) is a church in the village of Nabakevi (Abkhaz: Баҭаигәара), Gali Municipality, Autonomous Republic of Abkhazia, Georgia. The church was built in the Middle Ages.
