= Rukhi =

Village in Maharashtra

- Village
- Interactive map of Rukhi
- Country: India
- State: Maharashtra

Rukhi is a small village in Ratnagiri district, Maharashtra state in Western India. The 2011 Census of India recorded a total of 813 residents in the village. Rukhi is 554.26 hectares in size.
