= Tsarche fortress =

Historical & Medieval Monument

- Georgian: წარჩეს ციხე Abkhaz: Ҵарчатәи абааш
- Tsarche in Georgia, Abkhazia

Site information
- Condition: ruins

Location
- Tsarche fortress Tsarche fortress (Georgia)
- Coordinates: 42°42′30″N 41°39′30″E

Garrison information
- Designations: Georgia cultural heritage monument

Tsarche fortress (Georgian: წარჩეს ციხე, Abkhaz: Ҵарчатәи абааш) is a ruined Early Medieval fortification near the village of Tsarche in Abkhazia, Georgia.

== History ==
The Tsarche fortress sits on the top of a hill, near confluence of rivers Okhoja and Chkhortoli. Contours of the fortress walls repeat an elliptical shape of the hill. The fortress lies in ruins; only a 7–8 m high northern arc survives. In the middle of the fortress, a narrow stone staircase runs to a combat path. The wall is supplied with a walking trail whose width could accommodate two persons at a time. In the southeastern section, there is a reservoir with plastered walls.

The law of Georgia treats the monument as part of cultural heritage in the occupied territories and reported an urgent need of conservation.
