= Ghalidzga =

Ghalidzga River ღალიძგა Аалдзга
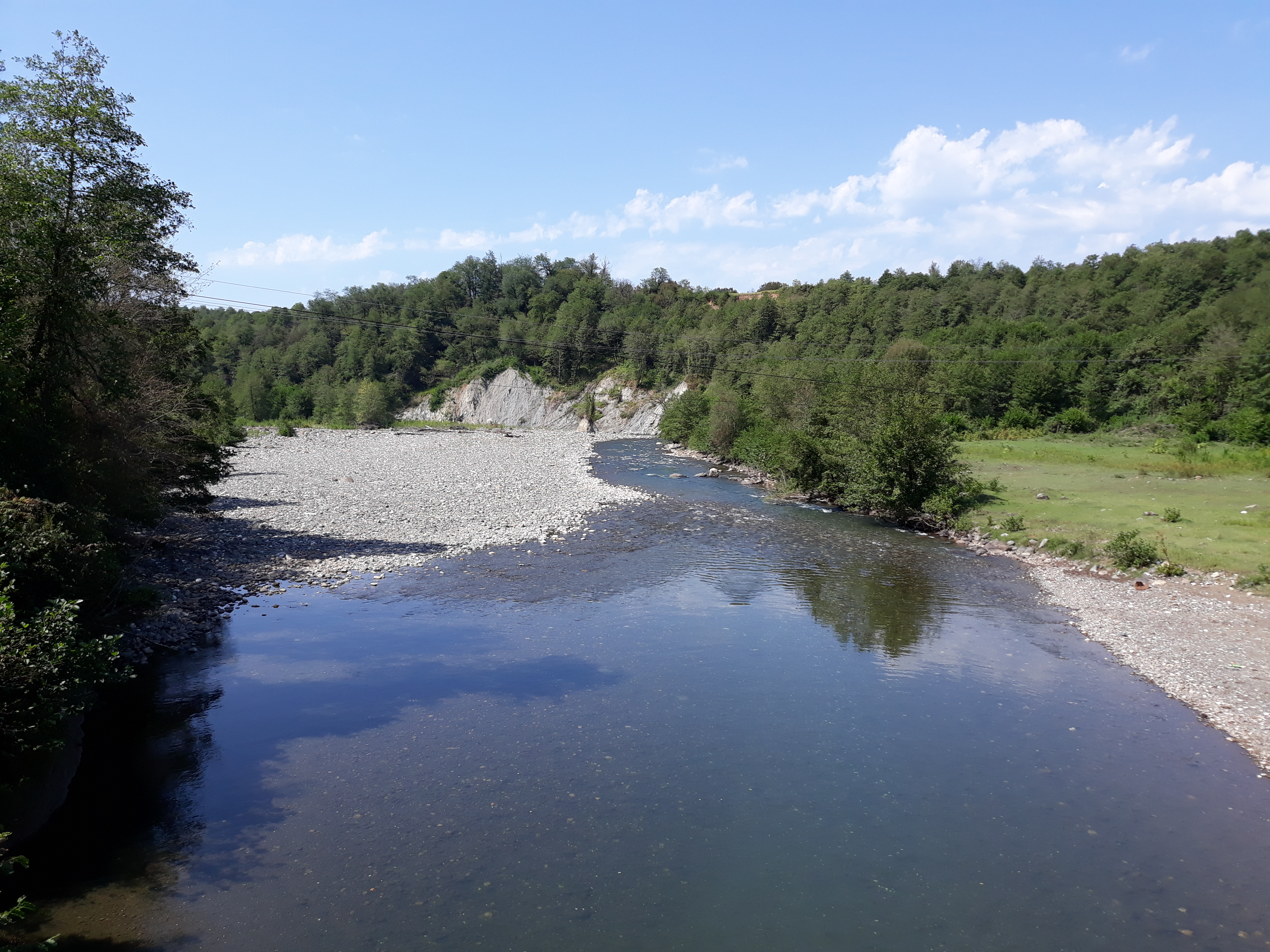

- Location within Abkhazia Location within Georgia

Location
- Country: Georgia, Abkhazia
- State: Ochamchire Municipality

Physical characteristics
- Source: Kodori Range
  - coordinates: 42°54′54″N 42°49′12″E
- Mouth: Black Sea
  - coordinates: 42°41′55″N 41°28′12″E
- Length: 53 km (33 mi)
- Basin size: 483 km^{2} (186 mi^{2})

Ghalidzga (Mingrelian: Ghalish Dzga - river bank; Georgian: ღალიძგა, romanized: ghalidzga [ˈɣälid̪͡z̪gä]; Abkhaz: Аалдзга, romanized: Aaldzga) is a river in Ochamchire Municipality, Abkhazia, Georgia. It originates on the southern slope of the Kodori Range, near the Khojali Mountain (elevation 3,313 m). Length - 53 km, basin area - 483 km^{2}. In the upper reaches there is a mountain river with well-defined rapid currents, in the lower reaches it flows into the lowlands and the Black Sea joins south of Ochamchire. It feeds on rain and groundwater. Knows floods in Spring, waterlogging in winter. Characterized by frequent flooding. Average annual flow near the city of Ochamchire - 25.1 mW / s. The main tributaries are the river Gejiri.

Arrives in the cities of Tkvarcheli and Ochamchire. It is mentioned in 18th century sources as the western border of Samurzakano.
