= List of power stations in Georgia (country) =

The following page lists the power stations in Georgia, a country that spans West Asia and Eastern Europe.

== Thermal ==
Power plant	Capacity (MW)	Units	Year completed
Gardabani	840	1 x 130 MW, 5 x 142 MW	1991
Mtkvari	600	2 x 300 MW	1994
Gardabani (CCPP)	230	1 x 230 MW	2015
Gardabani - 2 (CCPP)	230	1 x 230 MW	2020
Gardabani (OCGT)	110	2 x 55 MW	2006

== Hydroelectric ==
Big stations with reservoirs and their electricity generation (Mln kwh)
#	HPP name	Year completed	1	2	2012	2013	2014	2015	2016	2017	2018	2019	2020	20**	20**	20**	20**	20**	Aver.
1	Engurhesi	1978	1300	4300.00	3173.271	3605.134	3331.9	3313.9	3548.7	3594.2	4019.1	3341.3	2735.7	0	0	0	0	0	3407.0
2	Vardnilhesi	1970	220	700.00	586.050	667.20	634.1	592.0	662.3	670.1	738.4	686.3	591.1	0	0	0	0	0	647.5
3	Khrami 1	1947	112.8	217.00	267.427	186.712	205.2	228.3	226.2	195.3	194.2	170.8	145.9	0	0	0	0	0	202.2
4	Khrami 2	1963	110	328.00	363.010	299.242	316.8	346.0	338.9	298.3	311.0	271.5	253.2	0	0	0	0	0	310.9
5	Shaorhesi	1955	38.4	116.90	99.305	107.981	147.4	107.1	131.8	146.7	127.6	83.8	65.9	0	0	0	0	0	113.1
6	Dzevrulhesi	1956	80	147.50	119.260	124.720	145.1	120.5	159.2	150.4	130.8	100.5	80.8	0	0	0	0	0	125.7
7	Zhinvalhesi	1986	130	396.30	297.304	394.084	378.4	410.5	339.1	292.8	279.9	315.4	206.2	0	0	0	0	0	323.7
	Sum	--	2277.2	7078.7	4905.62	5385.07	5158.9	5118.3	5406.2	5347.8	5801	4969.6	4078.8	0	0	0	0	0	5130.1
* 1 Installed capacity of HPP (MW) * 2 multi annual generation of HPP calculated during feasibility study (Mln kwh) * (2012/20) Actual generation (Mln kwh) * (aver.) Actual generation's multi annual generation (Mln kwh)

Seasonal stations and their electricity generation (Mln kwh)
#	HPP name	Year completed	1	2	2012	2013	2014	2015	2016	2017	2018	2019	2020	20**	20**	20**	20**	20**	Aver.
1	Vartsikhe hesi	N/A	184	829.0	724.9	864.3	886.9	774.9	936.1	841.1	848.1	727.3	670.6	0	0	0	0	0	808.2
2	Gumati hesi	N/A	66.8	276.9	228.2	345.3	339.5	288.8	368.5	321.5	315.6	277.7	273.7	0	0	0	0	0	306.5
3	Rion hesi	1933	48.0	286.5	276.8	308.4	317.5	331.6	313.0	299.3	313.9	281.8	259.4	0	0	0	0	0	300.2
4	Ladjanur hesi	N/A	112.5	332.8	268.5	450.4	408.1	382.4	454.9	390.3	413.7	364.6	343.3	0	0	0	0	0	386.2
5	Ortachala hesi	1953	18.0	82.8	69.8	83.3	85.8	79.2	93.0	66.1	85.9	76.3	68.4	0	0	0	0	0	78.6
6	Satskhenisi hesi	1952	14.0	26.6	42.8	17.9	15.5	18.4	44.8	25.8	11.0	10.9	08.9	0	0	0	0	0	21.8
7	Zahesi	1927	35.8	166.0	122.2	169.5	190.1	188.0	215.9	179.6	201.7	145.9	120.7	0	0	0	0	0	170.4
8	Chitakhev hesi	1949/1951	21.0	102.7	104.0	92.1	100.5	96.2	98.1	88.6	101.6	100.6	94.4	0	0	0	0	0	97.3
9	Khador hesi	N/A	24.0	120.0	136.4	146.1	130.3	139.3	130.4	114.8	120.3	117.3	107.5	0	0	0	0	0	126.9
10	Atshesi	N/A	16.0	58.4	74.1	80.1	80.3	58.9	104.1	93.6	89.3	77.5	71.5	0	0	0	0	0	81.0
11	Larsi hesi	2014	19.0	111.0	0	0	42.3	68.9	28.1	70.9	79.7	73.1	73.7	0	0	0	0	0	62.4
12	Paravan hesi	2014	87.0	451.1	0	0	85.8	410.7	427.9	384.2	403.7	374.9	324.6	0	0	0	0	0	487.7
13	Dariali hesi	2016	108	510	0	0	0	0	22.1	244.2	262.2	270.5	445.9	0	0	0	0	0	305.7
14	Khelvacharui hesi 1	2016	47.5	229.8	0	0	0	0	1.9	136.4	186.4	163.4	163.4	0	0	0	0	0	162.4
15	Shuakhevi hesi	2017	178	450	0	0	0	0	0	3.2	0	0	258.4	0	0	0	0	0	258.4
16	kirnati hesi	2018	51.25	219	0	0	0	0	0	0	10.9	83.9	80.9	0	0	0	0	0	82.4
17	Oldenergy hesi	2018	21.39	122.3	0	0	0	0	0	0	13.1	105.9	80.8	0	0	0	0	0	93.4
18	Mestiachala hesi 1	2019 / closed	20	69.15	0	0	0	0	0	0	0	35	0	0	0	0	0	0	0
19	Mestiachala hesi 2	2019	30	106.7	0	0	0	0	0	0	0	20.8	91.6	0	0	0	0	0	91.6
	Sum	--	1102.2	4550.7	2047.7	2557.4	2682.6	2837.3	3238.8	3259.6	3453.1	3089.5	3537.7	0	0	0	0	0	2967.1
* 1 Installed capacity of HPP (MW) * 2 Multi annual generation of HPP calculated during feasibility study (Mln kwh) * (2012/20) Actual generation (Mln kwh) * (Aver.) Actual generation's multi annual generation (Mln kwh)

Small stations and their electricity generation (Mln kwh)
#	HPP name	Year completed	1	2	2012	2013	2014	2015	2016	2017	2018	2019	20**	20**	20**	20**	20**	20**	Aver.
1	Alazani hesi	N/A	4.8	41.5	25.21	26.46	32.9	27.7	32.3	28.4	30.7	27	0	0	0	0	0	0	28.8
2	Bzhuzha hesi	N/A	12.24	84.6	60.50	73.12	74.4	60.5	77.4	68.9	66.2	61.1	0	0	0	0	0	0	67.7
3	Abhesi	N/A	2.0	6.98	5.91	6.22	5.2	5.3	6.3	5.8	5.1	4.8	0	0	0	0	0	0	5.5
4	Tetrikhevi HPP	1955	12.4	24.0	26.46	7.07	5.1	8.0	19.1	13.2	3.9	2.6	0	0	0	0	0	0	10.6
5	Sion hesi	N/A	9.14	25.75	14.18	18.21	23.2	19.5	25.0	19.8	12.4	16	0	0	0	0	0	0	18.5
6	Ritseula hesi	N/A	6.10	35.10	20.45	24.21	15.8	10.7	16.1	12.6	16.1	9.1	0	0	0	0	0	0	15.6
7	Chala hesi	N/A	1.5	4.47	4.29	5.04	4.5	5.2	6.5	3.4	4.9	2.9	0	0	0	0	0	0	4.5
8	Chkhori hesi	N/A	3.35	17.9	17.90	23.63	18.0	18.5	18.3	16.3	13.2	16.5	0	0	0	0	0	0	17.7
9	Dashbashi hesi	N/A	1.26	10.95	9.21	10.64	10.2	9.7	10.6	10.7	7.1	11.3	0	0	0	0	0	0	9.9
10	Mashavera hesi	N/A	0.8	2.7	2.28	2.15	1.9	2.0	2.6	2.2	2.6	2.5	0	0	0	0	0	0	2.2
11	Kabal hesi	N/A	1.5	7.61	4.93	6.79	6.0	6.7	6.9	6.1	5.3	5.3	0	0	0	0	0	0	6.0
12	Kaxareti hesi	N/A	2.0	15.2	8.04	8.76	10.2	8.7	9.3	7.2	8.1	7.5	0	0	0	0	0	0	8.4
13	Intsoba hesi	N/A	1.6	6.3	5.57	6.15	6.5	5.9	9.9	9.4	10.3	8	0	0	0	0	0	0	7.7
14	Energetiki	N/A	0.59	1.44	0.94	0.99	0.9	1.2	1.1	1.0	1.4	1.9	0	0	0	0	0	0	1.1
15	Algeti hesi	N/A	1.25	3.52	0.77	0.0	0.1	1.2	0.6	0.1	0.0	0	0	0	0	0	0	0	0.55
16	Bakuri hesi	N/A	2.17	5.84	4.70	5.84	6.7	6.1	7.4	4.2	7.9	9.7	0	0	0	0	0	0	6.5
17	Misaktsieli hesi	N/A	3.0	12.3	6.79	8.27	11.5	7.6	9.6	8.3	11.1	10.3	0	0	0	0	0	0	9.1
18	Squri hesi	N/A	1.02	4.8	4.14	5.27	4.7	4.2	5.1	4.8	4.7	4.4	0	0	0	0	0	0	4.6
19	Khertvisi hesi	N/A	0.6	1.8	1.72	1.80	1.7	1.3	1.5	1.4	1.7	1.6	0	0	0	0	0	0	1.5
20	Kinkisha hesi	N/A	1.4	2.38	1.9	1.81	1.8	2.0	2.7	2.8	2.0	2.0	0	0	0	0	0	0	2.1
21	Achi hesi	N/A	1.0	5.01	4.56	5.23	6.3	5.7	6.9	6.1	5.7	4.4	0	0	0	0	0	0	5.6
22	Igoeti hesi	N/A	1.05	10.23	0.19	2.32	1.9	3.6	3.7	3.1	2.2	1.9	0	0	0	0	0	0	2.3
23	Sanalia hesi	N/A	5.0	7.78	3.30	4.50	4.6	3.7	2.9	0.8	7.3	7.8	0	0	0	0	0	0	4.36
24	Rustavi hesi	N/A	1.5	3.54	3.30	1.16	3.3	3.3	3.2	3.2	3.3	2.4	0	0	0	0	0	0	2.8
25	Sulori hesi	N/A	0.8	2.93	2.68	2.66	3.1	2.5	2.3	2.4	2.3	2.0	0	0	0	0	0	0	2.5
26	Okami hesi	N/A	1.6	8.2	1.09	3.37	2.9	5.1	3.8	3.4	3.5	2.4	0	0	0	0	0	0	3.2
27	Lopota hesi	N/A	2.5	8.13	3.53	0.0	3.8	5.2	6.1	5.0	5.8	4.1	0	0	0	0	0	0	4.20
28	Zvareti hesi	N/A	0.26	0.93	0.80	5.30	1.2	1.2	1.1	1.1	0.8	0.9	0	0	0	0	0	0	1.6
29	Pshavela hesi	N/A	1.0	11.6	1.11	3.20	2.2	2.1	16.2	16.5	15.6	18.4	0	0	0	0	0	0	16.7
30	Tiriphoni hesi	N/A	1.26	15.75	1.00	3.39	3.8	6.5	6.0	6.7	7.9	6	0	0	0	0	0	0	5.2
31	Pantiani hesi	N/A	0.4	2.55	1.07	1.13	1.7	1.5	1.7	2.2	2.7	2.4	0	0	0	0	0	0	1.8
32	Khadori 2	N/A	5.4	30.0	9.20	28.62	25.7	28.6	28.8	25.7	27.2	24.5	0	0	0	0	0	0	24.8
33	Khan hesi	N/A	0.3	1.5	0.05	0.97	1	1.4	1.4	1.4	1.5	1.5	0	0	0	0	0	0	1.3
34	Khazbegi hesi	N/A	6.0	39.4	1.82	2.09	13.5	26.2	24.1	24.4	25.0	25.0	0	0	0	0	0	0	24.9
35	Racha hesi	2013	11.0	55.7	0	8.35	45.6	46.6	52.9	45.2	53.3	36.7	0	0	0	0	0	0	46.7
36	Dagva hesi	2013	0.1	0.49	0	0.01	0.0	0.02	0.0	0.0	0.0	0.0	0	0	0	0	0	0	0
37	Alazani 2	2013	6.0	41.75	0	7.36	21.6	20.5	23.8	19.4	21.7	16.9	0	0	0	0	0	0	20.7
38	Silda hesi	2013	5.0	34.5	0	5.00	20.4	19.7	22.7	19.4	19.9	16.8	0	0	0	0	0	0	19.8
39	Baxvi hesi 3	2013	10.0	38.63	0	0.01	0.0	10.0	46.7	39.1	39.8	33.6	0	0	0	0	0	0	39.8
40	Khazbegi 2	2014	0.38	1.4	0	0	0.9	0.0	0.0	0.0	0.0	0	0	0	0	0	0	0	0
41	Aeagvi hesi	2014	8.5	50.77	0	0	45.3	45.1	51.3	46.9	46.6	49.3	0	0	0	0	0	0	47.4
42	Akhmeta hesi	2014	9.1	54.86	0	0	39.1	53.6	53.0	36.5	45.6	28.8	0	0	0	0	0	0	42.8
43	Martkhopi hesi	1952	3.86	6.42	0	0	0	3.5	9.4	3.7	0.7	0.6	0	0	0	0	0	0	3.6
44	Khazreti hesi	2015	2.5	13.8	0	0	0	2.5	6.6	7.4	9.1	7.4	0	0	0	0	0	0	6.6
45	Pshavela hesi (Stori Power)	2015	1.95	8.63	0	0	0	8.3	10.1	8.5	9.7	5.5	0	0	0	0	0	0	8.4
46	Debeda hesi	2015	2.5	13.0	0	0	0	0.04	13.7	12.1	18.3	15.8	0	0	0	0	0	0	15.0
47	Shakshaketi hesi	2016	1.5	8.45	0	0	0	0	0.8	4.7	6.4	4.3	0	0	0	0	0	0	5.1
48	Saguramo hesi	2016	4.2	36.35	0	0	0	0	6.7	23.9	27.1	14.5	0	0	0	0	0	0	21.8
49	Marneuli hesi	2017	0.25	1.88	0	0	0	0	0.0	0.6	0.9	1.3	0	0	0	0	0	0	0.9
50	Makhsania hesi	2017	0.5	2.5	0	0	0	0	0.0	0.7	2.0	1.6	0	0	0	0	0	0	1.4
51	Nabeghlavi hesi	2017	1.9	13.0	0	0	0	0	0	3.6	10.0	8.7	0	0	0	0	0	0	9.4
52	Ghoresha hesi	2017	0.12	0.58	0	0	0	0	0	0.0	0.1	0.3	0	0	0	0	0	0	0.2
53	Kintrisha hesi	2017	5.5	38.7	0	0	0	0	0	1.9	35.2	24.3	0	0	0	0	0	0	29.8
54	Shilda hesi 1	2018	1.2	9.2	0	0	0	0	0	0	5.1	5.4	0	0	0	0	0	0	5.3
55	Kheor hesi	2018	1.3	8	0	0	0	0	0	0	2.2	3	0	0	0	0	0	0	2.6
56	Kasleti hesi 2	2018	9	45.8	0	0	0	0	0	0	11.8	34.2	0	0	0	0	0	0	34.2
57	Bodorna hesi	2018	2.5	13.3	0	0	0	0	0	0	0.5	8.4	0	0	0	0	0	0	8.4
58	Skurdidi hesi	2018	1.33	6.87	0	0	0	0	0	0	0.9	4.4	0	0	0	0	0	0	4.4
59	Jonouli hesi 1	2018	1.1	8.5	0	0	0	0	0	0	0.2	4.1	0	0	0	0	0	0	4.1
60	Aragvi hesi 2	2018	1.95	13.5	0	0	0	0	0	0	0.05	13.3	0	0	0	0	0	0	13.3
61	Oro hesi	2019	1.1	5.3	0	0	0	0	0	0	0.0	1.8	0	0	0	0	0	0	1.8
62	Avani hesi	2019	3.5	15.5	0	0	0	0	0	0	0.0	5.3	0	0	0	0	0	0	5.3
63	Sashuala hesi 2	2019	5	21.8	0	0	0	0	0	0	0.0	0.4	0	0	0	0	0	0	0
64	Chapala hesi	2019	0.49	2.5	0	0	0	0	0	0	0.0	0.1	0	0	0	0	0	0	0
65	Khelra hesi	2019	3.7	19.6	0	0	0	0	0	0	0.0	0.1	0	0	0	0	0	0	0
66	Ifari hesi	2019	3.3	18.3	0	0	0	0	0	0	0.0	0.1	0	0	0	0	0	0	0
68	Dzama hesi	2020	0.81	2.9	0	0	0	0	0	0	0	0.0	0	0	0	0	0	0	0
67	Lakhami 2 hesi	2020	9.5	46.8	0	0	0	0	0	0	0	0.0	0	0	0	0	0	0	0
68	Lakhami 1 hesi	2020	6.5	31.8	0	0	0	0	0	0	0	0.0	0	0	0	0	0	0	0
	Sum	--	223.9	1153.7	259.59	327.1	489.2	518.46	674.2	602.2	692.6	655.2	0	0	0	0	0	0	527.3
* 1 Installed capacity of HPP (MW) * 2 Multi annual generation of HPP calculated during feasibility study (Mln kwh) * (2012/18) Actual generation (Mln kwh) * (Aver.) Actual generation's multi annual generation (Mln kwh)

== Wind ==
Power plant	Capacity (MW)	Units	Year completed
Kartli wind farm	20.7	6 x 3.45	2016

== See also ==
- Energy in Georgia (country)
- List of largest power stations in the world
- List of power stations in Asia
- List of power stations in Europe
