= Samurzakano =

Samurzakano სამურზაყანო
- Historical region
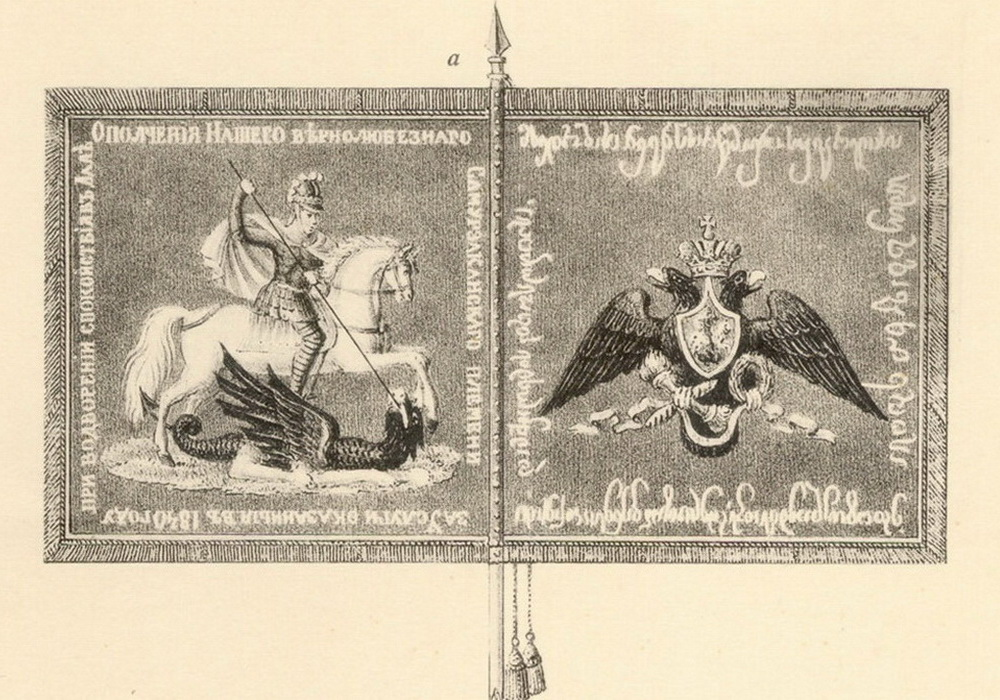
- Samurzakano Militia standard, 1841

- Location within Abkhazia Location within Georgia
- Coordinates: 42°41′N 41°39′E; An approximate geographical area.
- Country: Georgia
- Mkhare: Abkhazia
- Capital: Tbilisi

Samurzakano (Georgian and Mingrelian: სამურზაყანო, romanized: samurzak'ano) is a historical region in southeastern Abkhazia, in western Georgia. It is populated by Mingrelians.

== History ==
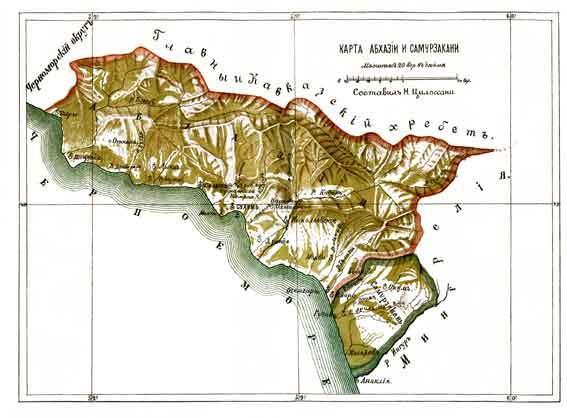
Samurzakano and Abkhazia under the Russian Empire in 1899.

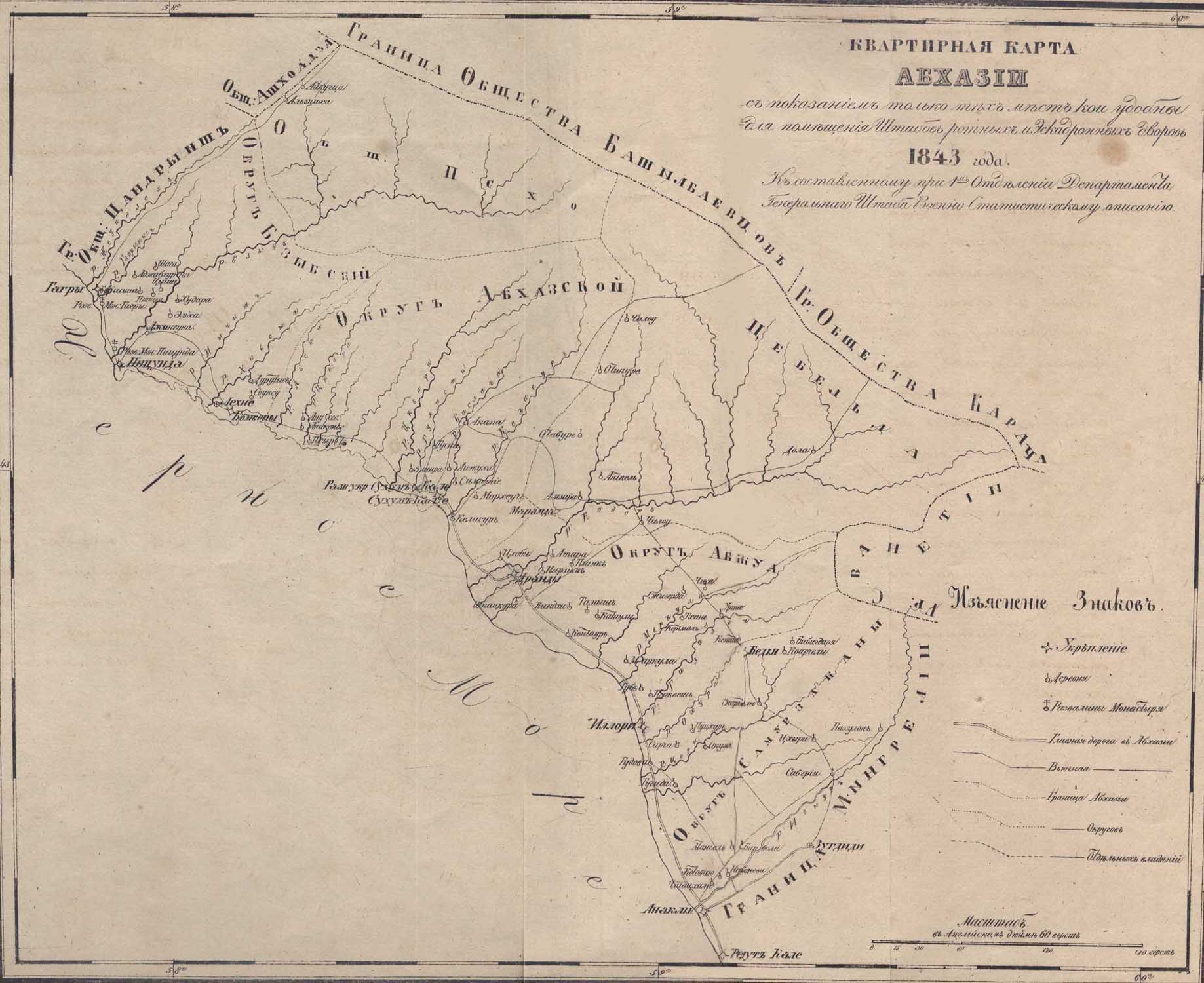
Samurzakano and Abkhazia under the Russian Empire in 1843.

Samurzakano was established as a fief of one of the branches of the Chachba family in the early 18th century. It included the territory of the contemporary Gali district and part of Ochamchire district.

The Georgian Soviet Encyclopaedia wrote "in 1705 three brothers of the Abkhazian ruling family, surnamed Chachba (in Georgian Shervashidze) divided up their territory, one taking the north (from Gagra to the R. Kodori), the second the central Abzhywa region (from the Kodori to the R. Ghalidzga), and the third, Murzaqan, the southern part (from the Ghalidzga to the R. Enguri), and so this province, which was roughly equivalent to the modern Gali District, became known as Samurzaqano."

== Gallery ==
Cultural depictions of Samurzakano
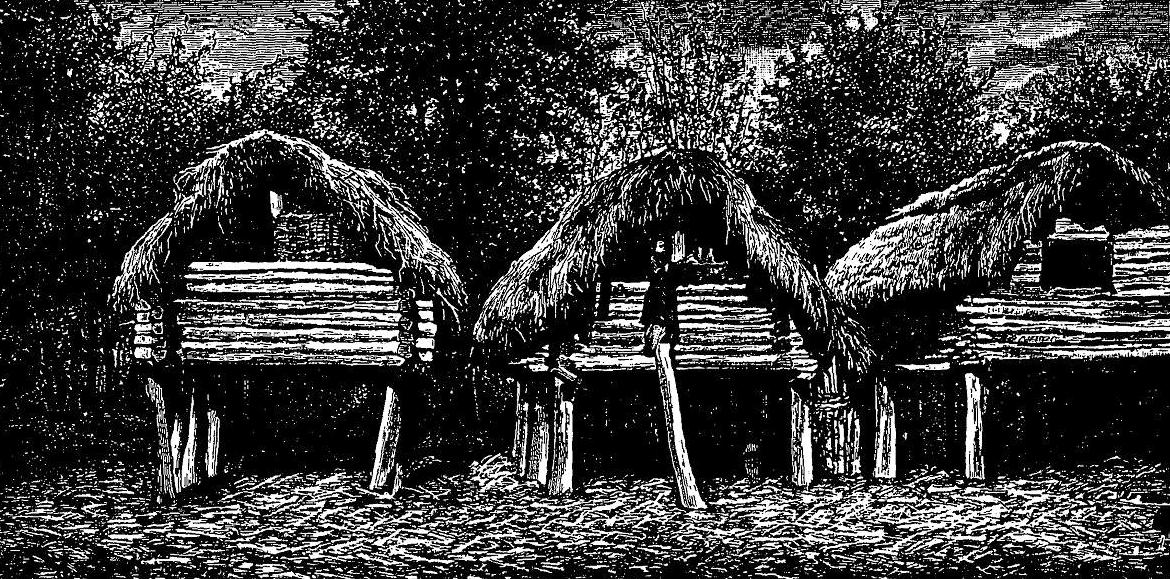
Barns in Saberio, 1884

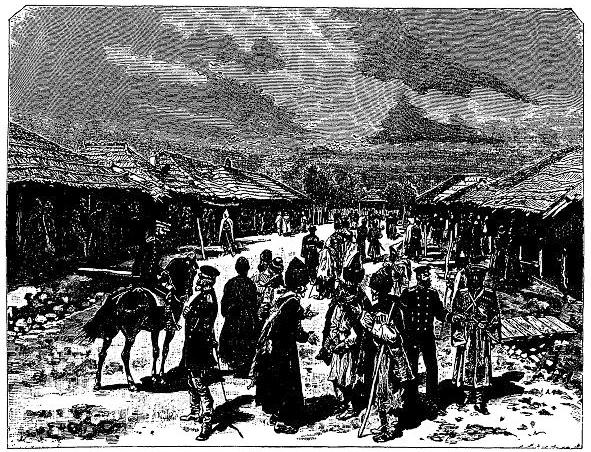
Bazaar in Okumi, 1884

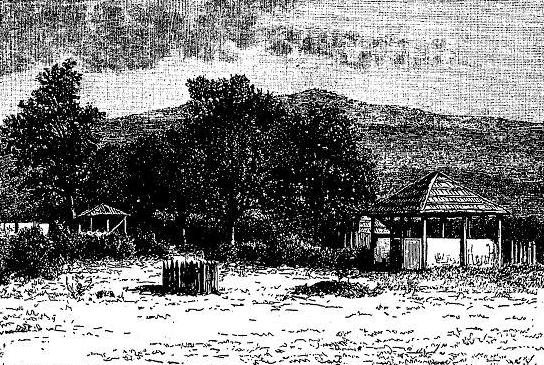
Okumi, 1884

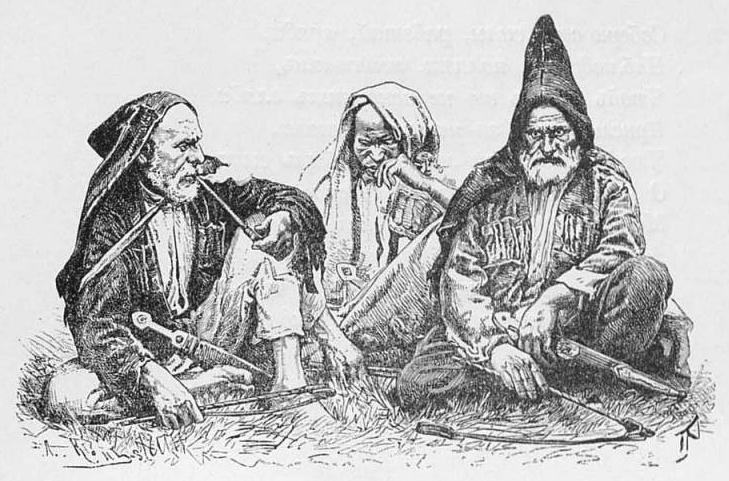
Samurzakanians, 1913

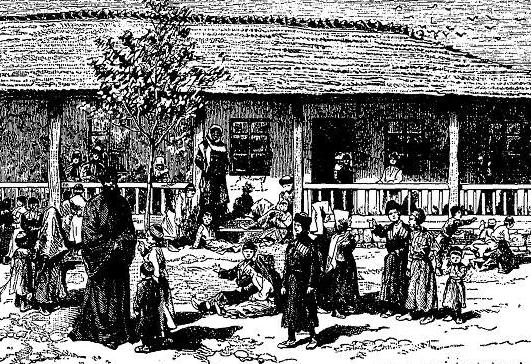
School in Okumi, 1884

.
