= Chuburkhinji =

Chuburkhinji Georgian: ჭუბურხინჯი Abkhaz: Хьацҳа or Ҷубурхьынџь
- Location within Georgia Location within Abkhazia
- Coordinates: 42°34′47″N 41°48′35″E
- Country: Georgia
- Partially recognized independent country: Abkhazia
- District: Gali
- Time zone: UTC+3 (MSK)
  - Summer (DST): UTC+4

Chuburkhinji (Georgian: ჭუბურხინჯი; Abkhaz: Хьацҳа or Ҷубурхьынџь) (known as Tzalamukhi [წალამუხი] until 1957) is a village in the Gali Municipality of Abkhazia, Georgia. As is the case in the rest of the district its population is almost exclusively Georgian.

== History ==
The village is the place of regular quadripartite (Georgian-Abkhaz-CIS peacekeepers-UNOMIG) meetings known informally as the "Chuburkhinji sessions". The meetings have been suspended by the Abkhaz side since November 2006.

On 24 May 2012, a settlement was opened in Chuburkhinji for the families of Russian border guards.

== See also ==
- Gali Municipality
- Gali District
