= Enguri =

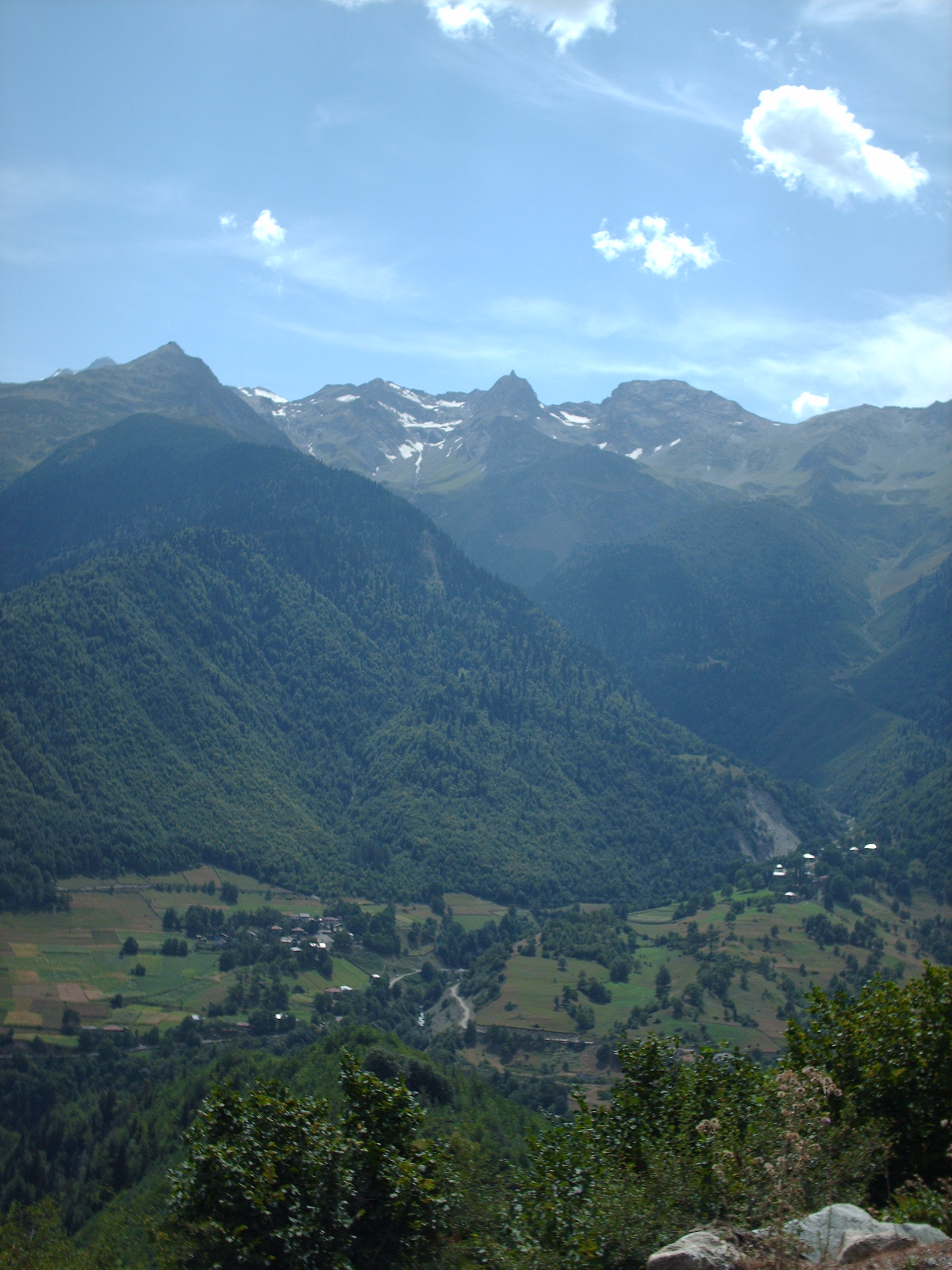
- The Enguri is the main source of water for the Enguri Dam in Georgia

- Location within Georgia Location within Abkhazia

Location
- Country: Georgia

Physical characteristics
- Source
  - location: Main Caucasian Range; Caucasus Major
- Mouth: Black Sea
  - coordinates: 42.3908°N 41.5592°E
- Length: 213 km (132 mi)
- Basin size: 4,060 km^{2} (1,570 sq mi)

Basin features
- Tributaries
  - right: Mulkhra

The Enguri (Georgian: ენგური, romanized: enguri [ˈe̞n̪guɾi], Mingrelian: ინგირი, romanized: ingiri, Abkhaz: Егры, Egry) is a river in western Georgia. It is 213 km (132 mi) long, and has a drainage basin of 4,060 km^{2} (1,570 sq mi). It originates near Ushguli in northeastern Svaneti and plays an important role in providing hydroelectric power to the area and the country.

The Enguri Valley

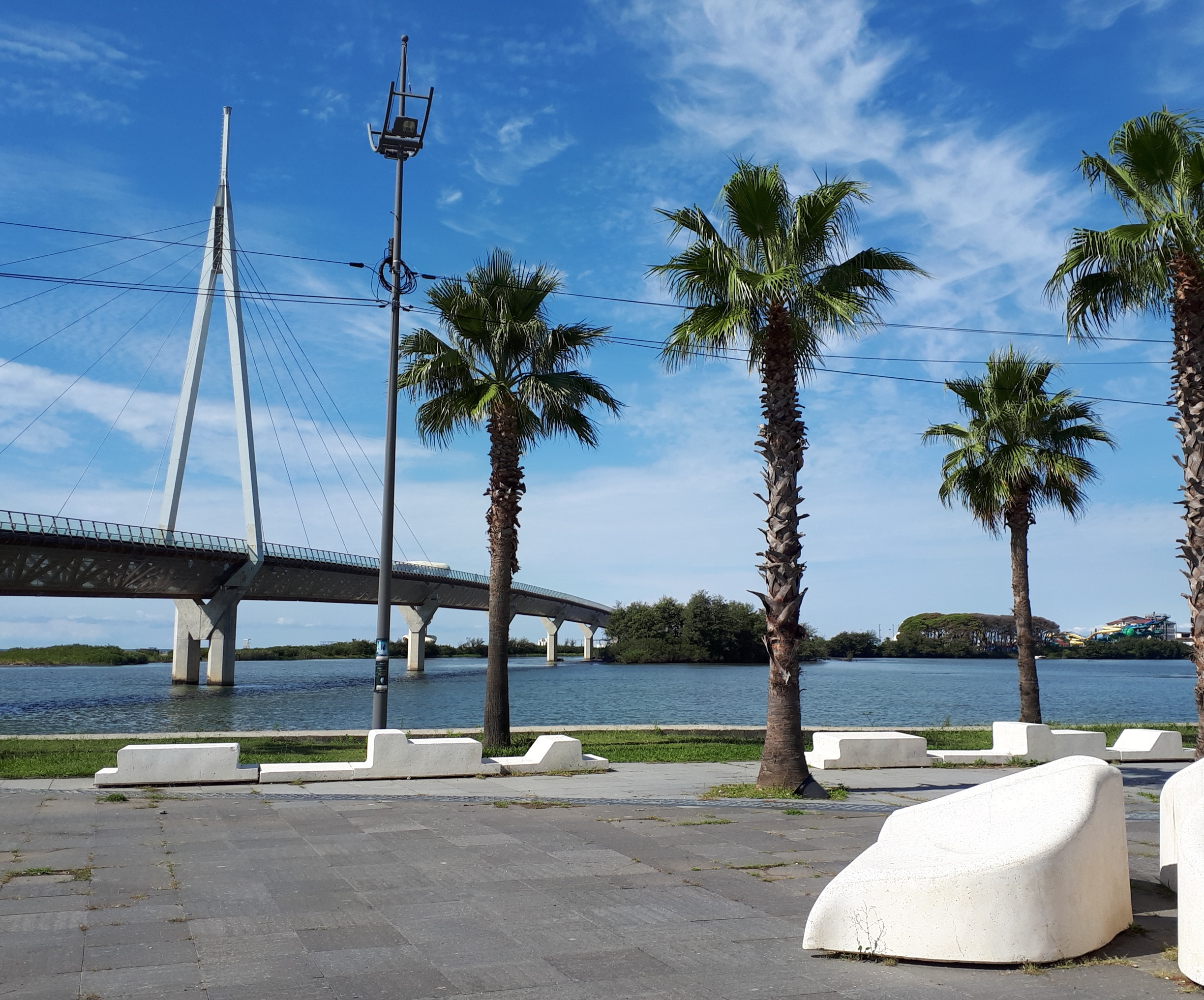
Bridge over the Enguri river near the coast. In the background the area of Abkhazia

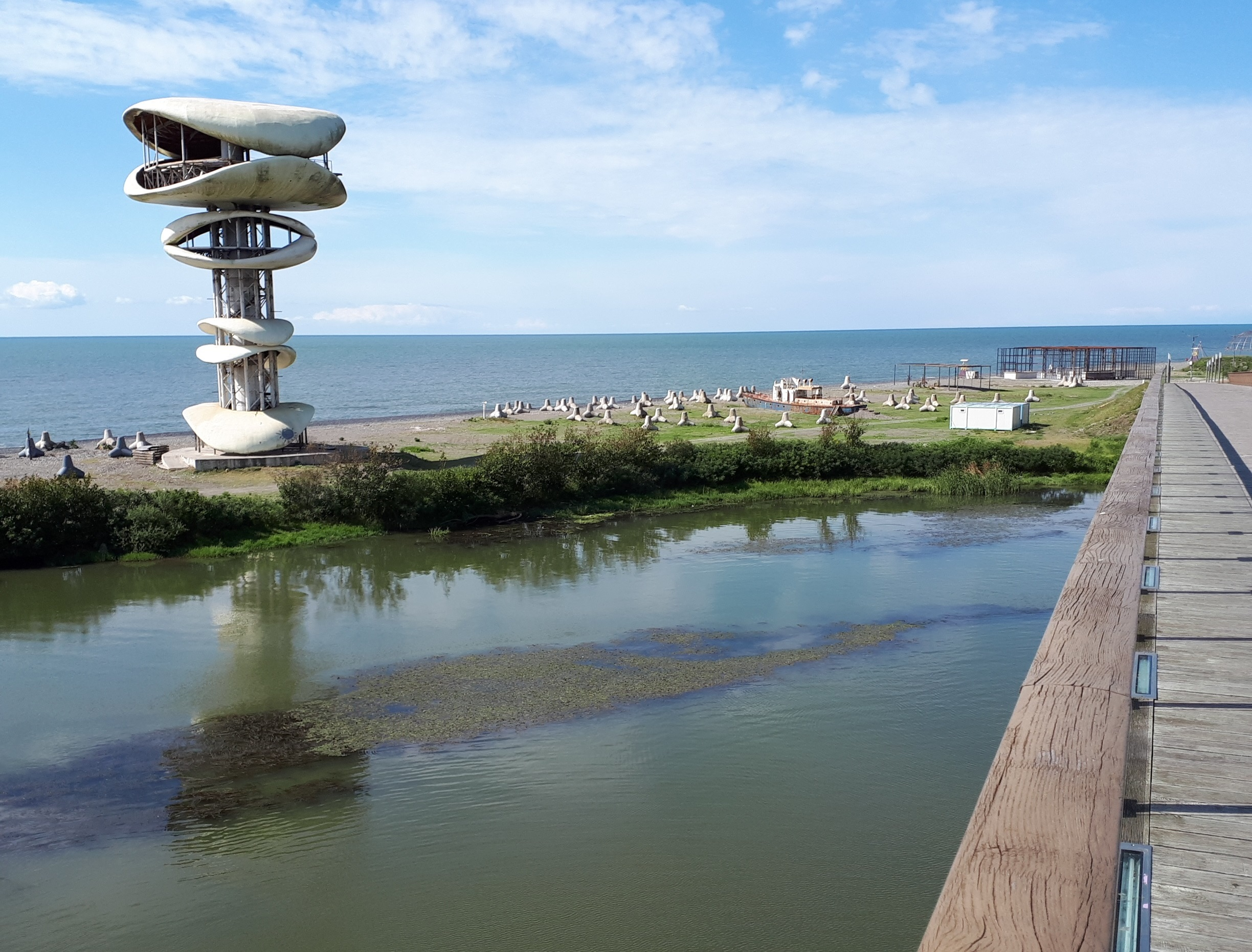
Mouth of Enguri river with viewtower, September 2018

The river emerges from the high Caucasus near the highest mountain in Georgia, Shkhara, and winds through the mountain valleys to the northwest before turning southwest to empty into the Black Sea near Anaklia.

Since the Abkhaz–Georgian conflict, both Georgia and Abkhazia keep troops on the river; Russia also keeps peacekeeping troops. The only legal crossing-point is the 870-metre (2,850 ft) long Enguri Bridge, which was built by German prisoners of war from 1944 until 1948. There are also a number of illegal connections across the river.

The river plays an important role in the Georgian energy production. In 1988 the Enguri Dam was built at a height of 240 metres (790 ft). At 750 metres (2,460 ft) across and 271.5 metres (891 ft) high, it is the largest construction in the Caucasus. The dam has the capacity to hold 1.1 million cubic metres (39,000,000 cu ft) of water. The underground water works produce about 40% of the national energy. The capacity is 1,300 megawatts.

== See also ==
- Abkhazia–Georgia border
- Mulkhura
