= Energy in Georgia (country) =

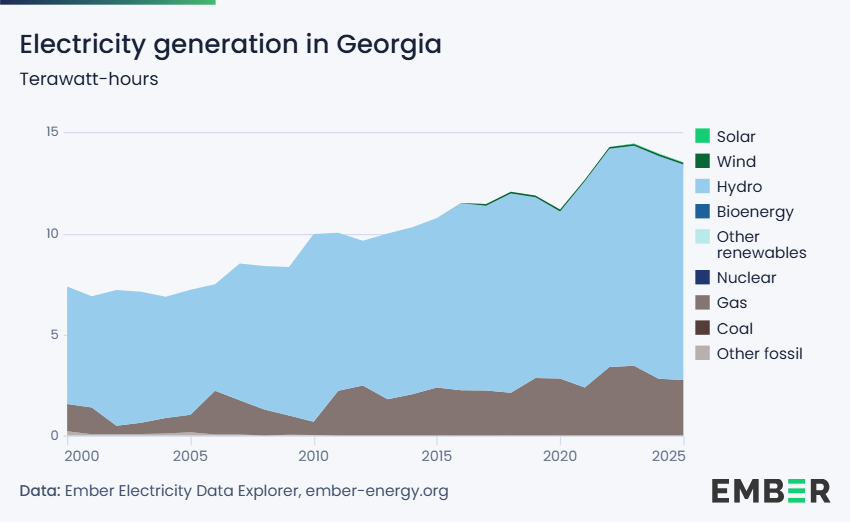
Electricity generation in Georgia in terawatt-hours

Georgia, a country just southwest of Russia, had a total primary energy supply (TPES) of 4.793 Mtoe in 2016. Electricity consumption was 11.5 TWh in 2016. Electricity production was 11.6 TWh, of which 81% from hydroelectricity and 19% from natural gas.

Georgia works in close collaboration with the European Union to implement sustainable biomass management practices by 2030. The country will continue to increase the renewable energy created as well as producing less greenhouse gasses that can be harmful to the environment.

Georgia's transmission lines connect its power grid to Russia, Turkey, Armenia and Azerbaijan. In July 2008, Georgia began exporting electricity to Russia through the Kavkasioni power line, which had already been used earlier on to import electricity from Russia into Georgia. Turkey also imported a significant amount of Georgian energy. However, as of September 2025, Georgia's electricity exports had fallen and were only flowing towards Azerbaijan (Turkey reduced its imports in response to falling demand), while imports were largely directed towards Russia and Azerbaijan.

== Wind power ==
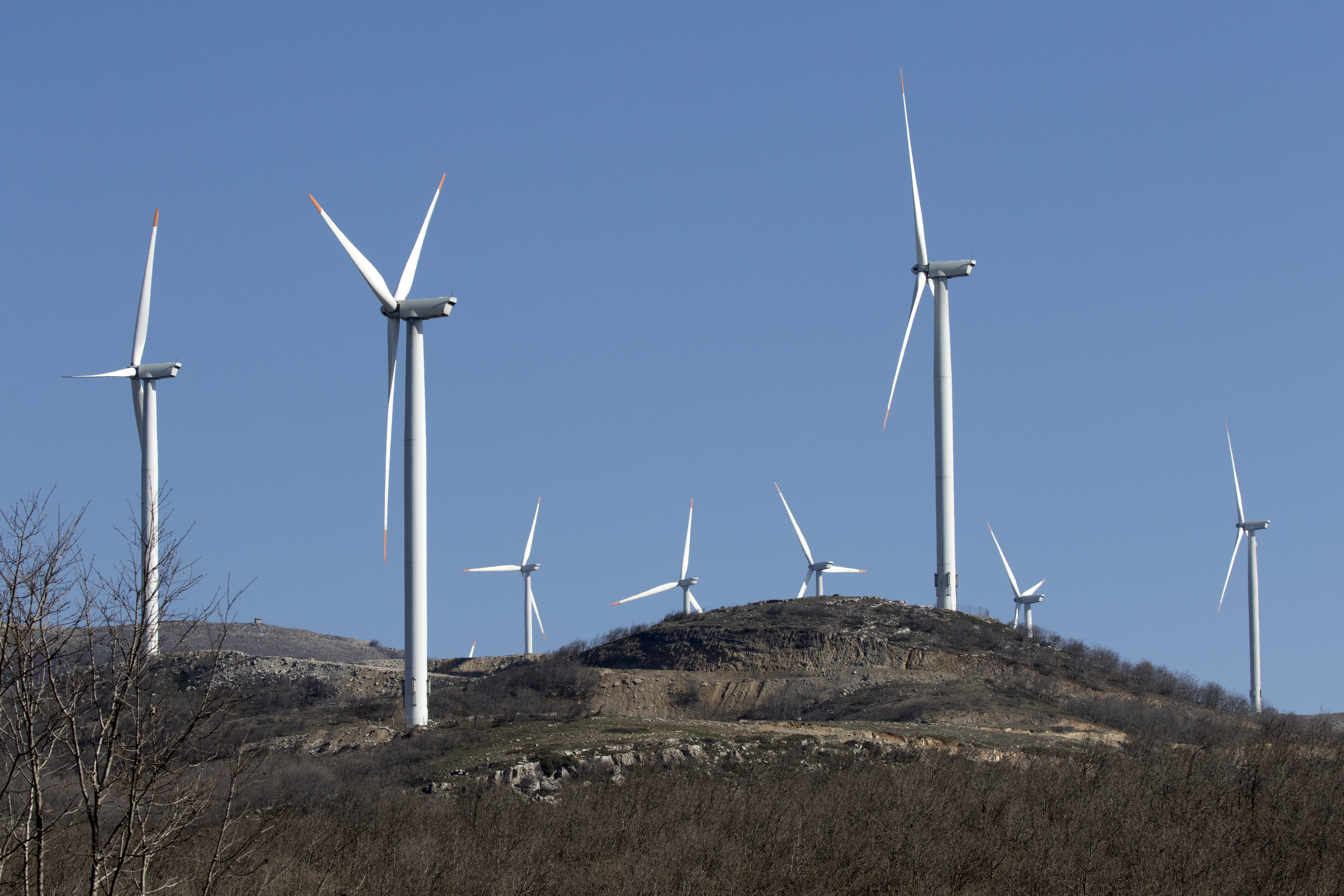
Wind turbine

Wind power in Georgia consists of one wind farm, completed in 2013 with 20 MW of capacity. Currently the only available wind farm is located in the Shida Kartli region, near its regional capital city of Gori. The country is in the planning process of creating a new offshore wind farm near Tbilisi. In the next following years the government has created a plan to increase the number of available wind farms to maximize wind power by 20%. The wind farms will be located in Zestaponi, Nigoza and Ruisi. An offshore wind farm typically has turbines located in bodies of water such as the sea. High wind speeds from storms at sea allow the wind farms to generate larger quantities of energy per year than compared to that of inland wind farms. In the case of Georgia the wind farm would be located near the Black Sea.

Approximately 1% of energy supply in Georgia comes from wind and solar farms. As of 2019 Georgia has produced 20.7 MW of renewable energy from wind power. It has the potential of producing 4.16 terawatt hours per year in electricity and heat. According to a report from the International Renewable Energy Agency, in 2019 73% of renewable energy was used for electricity and 26% was used for bioenergy.

As of 2021, the capacity had increased to 21 MW.

== Solar power ==
Solar energy in Georgia is widely available, due to high average insolation.

In 2021, Georgia contracted Abu Dhabi's Masdar to develop a 100-megawatt solar power project in a move to diversify the country's energy mix. The government is on a mission to reduce greenhouse gasses by this new implementation of alternative energy. It is expected that by 2030 greenhouse gasses will be reduced by 29.25 Mt CO2eq, which may be a result of the renewable energy options.

== Hydro power and natural gas ==
In the colder months of the year the average temperature in Georgia can get down to around 10°C. Since the temperatures are very cold, it is hard for the government to rely on hydropower. In place of hydropower, the main source of power in the winter is natural gas. The two sources of energy use a mutualistic relationship to optimize energy potential. In 2019 the country consumed 84,756 million cubic feet of natural gas. The natural gas is imported from Armenia, Azerbaijan, Russia, and Turkey.

In 2019 Georgia produced 8.93 terawatt hours per year from hydropower. The Georgian National Energy and Water Supply Regulatory Commission controls the use of hydropower. As of 2020, Georgia produced 3818 MW from hydropower. Although hydropower is not used much in the winter due to the temperature, in the summer it is one of the highest energy producers. However, an issue that may occur with rising temperature will affect evaporation. High hydropower use creates a chain link reaction that increases evaporation, which then increases precipitation, and leads to an increase in river flow.

== See also ==
- Georgia
