= Gali Municipality =

Gali Municipality გალის მუნიციპალიტეტი (Georgian) Гал амуниципалитет (Abkhaz) გალიშ მუნიციპალიტეტი (Mingrelian)
- Municipality
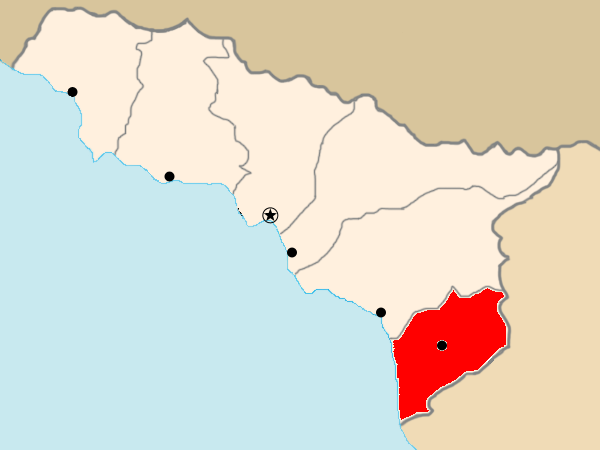
- Location of Gali Municipality in Autonomous Republic of Abkhazia

- Location within Abkhazia
- Coordinates: 42°38′N 41°44′E
- Country: Georgia
- Autonomous republic: Autonomous Republic of Abkhazia
- Capital: Gali

Area
  - Total: 1,003 km^{2} (387 sq mi)

Population (2014 est.)
  - Total: 29,287
  - Density: 29.20/km^{2} (75.63/sq mi)
- Time zone: UTC+3 (MSK)

Gali Municipality (Georgian: გალის მუნიციპალიტეტი, romanized: galis munitsip'alit'et'i; Mingrelian: გალიშ მუნიციპალიტეტი, romanized: galish munitsip’alit’et’i; Abkhaz: Гал амуниципалитет) is an administrative-territorial unit of the Autonomous Republic of Abkhazia, Georgia. De facto, the territory has been under Russian occupation since the early 1990s following the Abkhaz–Georgian conflict. The administrative center is the town of Gali.

The municipality shares borders with Ochamchire Municipality within Abkhazia and with Zugdidi Municipality of Samegrelo-Zemo Svaneti.

== History ==
Historically, the territory of Gali was part of the Samurzakano region within the Sukhumi Okrug of the Kutaisi Governorate during the Russian Empire. In 1921, it was incorporated into the Abkhaz ASSR within the Georgian SSR, and in 1939 it was reorganized as Gali District.

== Demographics ==
According to Georgian sources, the majority of the population are ethnic Mingrelians, who have faced displacement and repeated episodes of pressure and discrimination during and after the 1990s conflict. As of 2014, the population was estimated at about 29,000.

== See also ==
- Administrative divisions of Georgia (country)
- War in Abkhazia (1992–1993)
