= CEE Bankwatch Network =

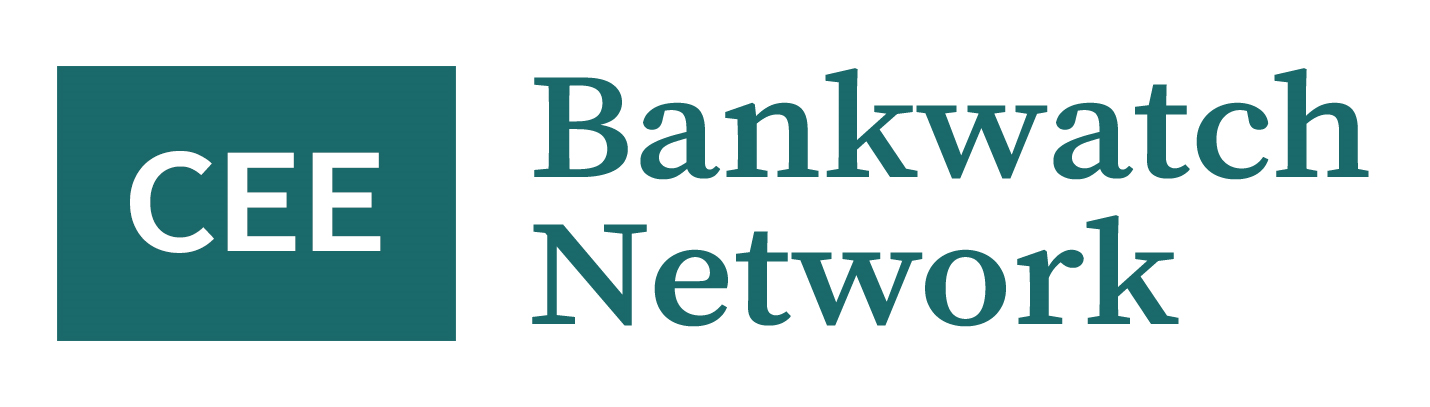
- Type: Non-governmental organization
- Purpose: Sustainability, Human Rights and Environmentalism concerning activities of international financial institutions
- Location: Prague, Czech Republic
- Region served: Global
- Method: advocacy, research, direct action
- Members: 17 member groups
- Website: bankwatch.org

CEE Bankwatch Network is a global network which operates in central and eastern Europe. There are 17 member groups, multiple non-governmental organizations based in different locations; the network is one of the largest networks of environmental NGOs in central and eastern Europe. Bankwatch's headquarters rest in Prague, Czech Republic.

Bankwatch was set up in 1995, and it focuses on monitoring the actions of different international financial institutions, such as the European Investment Bank (EIB) and European Bank for Reconstruction and Development (EBRD), while publicizing and exposing potential risks of the projects to the public in order to address environmental, social, and economical causes. The network aims to influence the decisions of the EIB, and the EBRD and campaign for the protection of human rights and the environment.

== Main Areas of Work ==
- Coal mining and power plants
- Unsustainable hydro power plants
- Extractive industries

== Projects followed by CEE Bankwatch Network ==
=== Fossil Fuel Projects ===
- Rovinari Power Station, Romania
- Gacko II, Bosnia and Herzegovina
- Southern Gas Corridor
- Ugljevik Power Plant, Bosnia and Herzegovina
- Pljevlja lignite power plant, Montenegro
- Tuzla lignite power plant, Bosnia and Herzegovina
- Sostanj lignite thermal power plant, Slovenia
- Stanari lignite power plant, Bosnia and Herzegovina
- Kolubara B lignite-fired power plant, Serbia and Kolubara lignite mine, Serbia
- Kostolac B3 lignite power plant, Serbia
- Kosova e Re lignite power plant, Kosovo
- Plomin coal power plant, Croatia
- Sakhalin-II oil and gas project, Russia

=== Unsustainable Renewable Projects ===
- Boskov most hydropower plant, North Macedonia
- Krapska Reka hydropower plant, Macedonia
- Dabrova Dolina hydropower plant, Croatia
- Buk Bijela dam and the Upper Drina cascade, Bosnia and Herzegovina
- Shuakhevi hydropower plant, Georgia
- Nenskra hydropower plant, Georgia
- Olkaria geothermal development, Kenya

=== Transport Projects ===
- Kresna gorge / Struma motorway, Bulgaria
- Khudoni hydropower plant, Georgia
- Volkswagen's emissions scandal and the EU's bank
- Mombasa-Mariakani road project, Kenya
- Corridor Vc motorway, Bosnia and Herzegovina

=== Municipal Infrastructure ===
- Belgrade incinerator, Serbia

=== Agrobussiness ===
- Myronivsky Hliboproduct (MHP), Ukraine

=== Extractive Industries ===
- Kumtor Gold Mine, Kyrgyzstan

== Member Group Organizations ==
- Bulgaria, Centre for Environmental Information and Education
- Bulgaria, Za Zemiata
- Croatia, Green Action (Zelena Akcia)
- Czech Republic, Hnutí Duha
- Czech Republic, Centre For Transport And Energy
- Estonia, Estonian Green Movement
- Georgia, Green Alternative
- Hungary, National Society of Conservationists - Friends of the Earth Hungary
- Latvia, Green Liberty
- Lithuania, Atgaja
- Macedonia, Eko-svest
- Poland, Polish Green Network (Polska Zielona Siec)
- Russia, Sakhalin Environmental Watch
- Serbia, Center for Ecology and Sustainable Development
- Slovakia, Friends of the Earth - CEPA
- Ukraine, Ecoaction (Екодія)
- Ukraine, National Ecological Centre of Ukraine
