= Environmental issues in Georgia (country) =

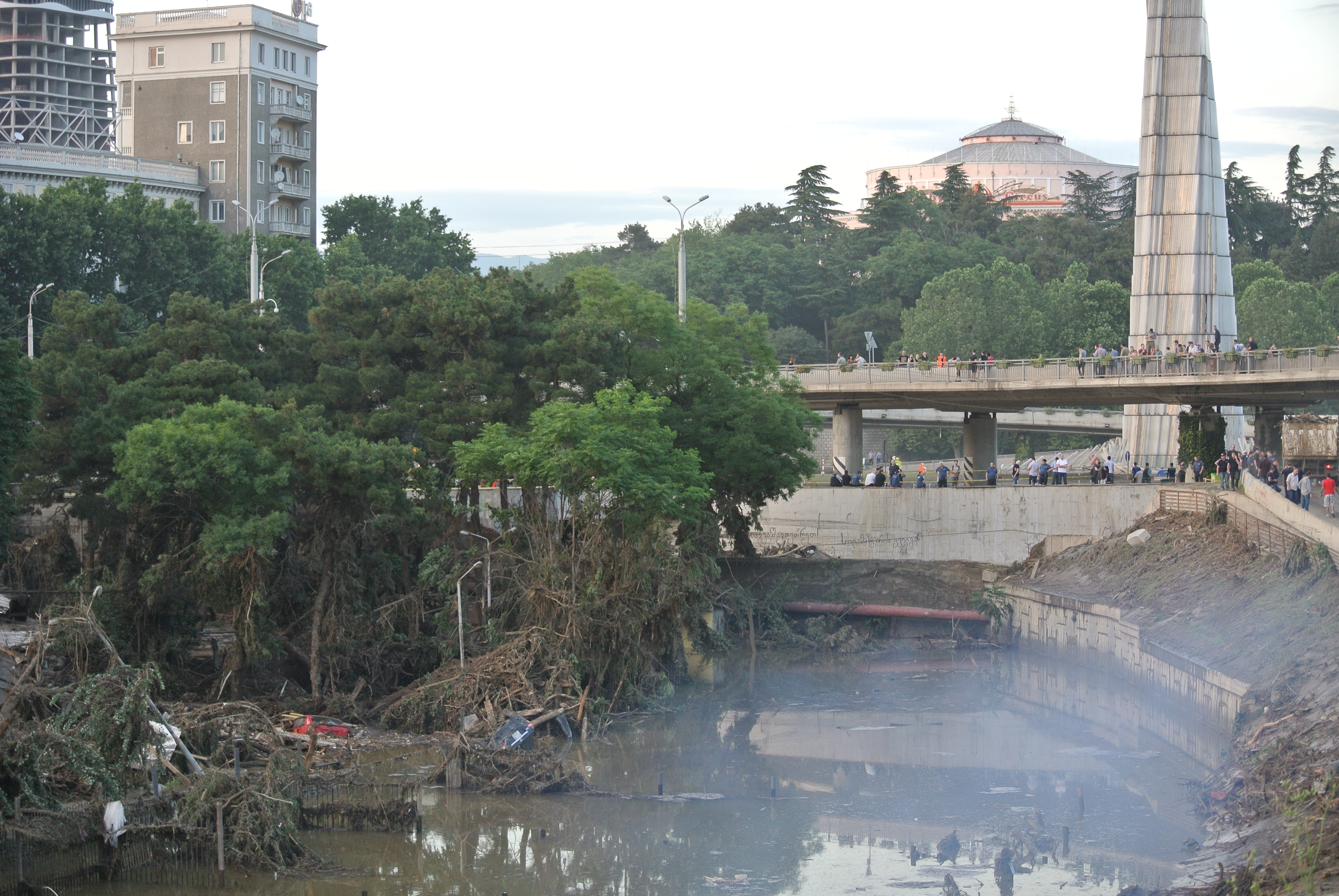
2015 Tbilisi flood

Situated in the South Caucasus Region bordered by the Black Sea to the West, the Russian Federation to the North, Azerbaijan to the East, Turkey to the Southwest, and Armenia to the South, Georgia is a small country supplied with profitable natural resources, heavenly scenes, copious water assets, rich living spaces, and ecosystems that are of local and worldwide significance.

Economic development is a reason for the country's welfare, which may affect the environment and natural resources negatively. The experience of developed countries has proven that pursuit for economic growth can exacerbate environment and natural resource problems. Some major environmental issues include: land and forest degradation, pollution, and waste management that lead to climate change and biodiversity loss. Georgia implements policies to help alleviate their environmental problems.

== Major issues ==
=== Land and forest degradation ===
The Georgian Ministry of Environment Protection and Natural Resources Protection rates 35% of its agricultural land as being degraded and, as per the Ministry of Agriculture, 60% of agrarian land in Georgia is of low or middle production quality. Significant drivers of land degradation are overgrazing, unplanned urban sprawling, and deforestation. Georgia had a 2018 Forest Landscape Integrity Index mean score of 7.79/10, ranking it 31st globally out of 172 countries.

Soil erosion processes, although considered natural phenomena, are exacerbated by different kinds of unsustainable human activities. Some of these are unsustainable mining and construction (e.g. hydropower infrastructures like Shuakhevi Hydro Power Plant), uncontrolled logging, poorly regulated urbanization, industrial activities in riverbeds, and a lack of compliance with land use regulations and with environmental and hydrological standards.

Due to the deterioration of land and the overlooked issues regarding the environment, flood control and determent of such periodical calamities caused by landslides and flash floods are imminent.

=== Air pollution ===
Deterioration of air quality is one of the many consequences of increased economic activity that comes with urbanization. In the case of Georgia, air pollution mainly comes from the transportation, industrial, and energy sectors. The major ambient air pollutants monitored in Georgia include particulate matter (total suspended particulates [TSP]), carbon monoxide (CO), nitrogen oxides (NO_{2}, NO), and sulfur dioxide (SO_{2}).

In Georgia the public transport system is not sufficiently developed (see Category:Public transport in Georgia). A significant proportion of the population uses private vehicles as the preferred mode of transport. The number of private vehicles has grown rapidly over the past decade and has almost doubled in the last five-year period. Traffic has increased followed by industrial sources. The country has seen a sharp rise in the number of old, dirty diesel vehicles on the road over the last decade and pollution testing is virtually non-existent. WHO and IEA provides a data that shows Georgia having the most deaths attributed to air pollution, compared to other countries.

Until 2000, Georgia used leaded fuel in most of their transportation system. Soviet auto models can run on low octane gasoline; European models run superior around higher-octane gas. A way to increase a fuel's octane level is to add lead. Majority of road vehicles (total number of vehicles approx. 323614) in Georgia today both public and private is of 15–20 years old. Many older cars require leaded petrol because the lead lubricates and protects the soft valves. Georgia is importing increasing numbers of 2nd hand European cars with catalytic converters and it imports a lot of low octane gas, which is at times manipulated through the addition of lead, to obtain higher octane/leaded gasoline. This in turn affects the composition of exhaust emissions, making its concentrations high in lead and benzene concentrations. August 14, 2018

=== Water resources and pollution ===
Georgia has plentiful water assets. Among the aggregate water assets of 63 trillion cubic metres (2.2×10^{15} cu ft) /year (long haul normal) just 1.6 billion m3/year or around 2% are being preoccupied. Around 66% of the disconnected water is utilized for inundated horticulture, and the other third for city and mechanical employments.

Significant issues that lead to water pollution are surface water contamination by squanders and unreasonable water utilization. Water contamination is associated with human movement, such as industrial waste, municipal waste, waste from health centers, and surfaces waste from agri-production. Waste management problems are a big contributor to pollution in the country of Georgia. For instance, according to the Minister of Environment Protection of Georgia, George Kachidze, high levels of ammonia and BOD3 are reported for most of the observed rivers and concentrations of heavy metals exceed permissible levels at certain locals on particular rivers.

Areas along Georgia, around 310 kilometers of coastline, are starting to feel the effects of conduit waste water that is beginning from the development of more than 170 million people who live adjacent the various streams that energize the Black Sea.

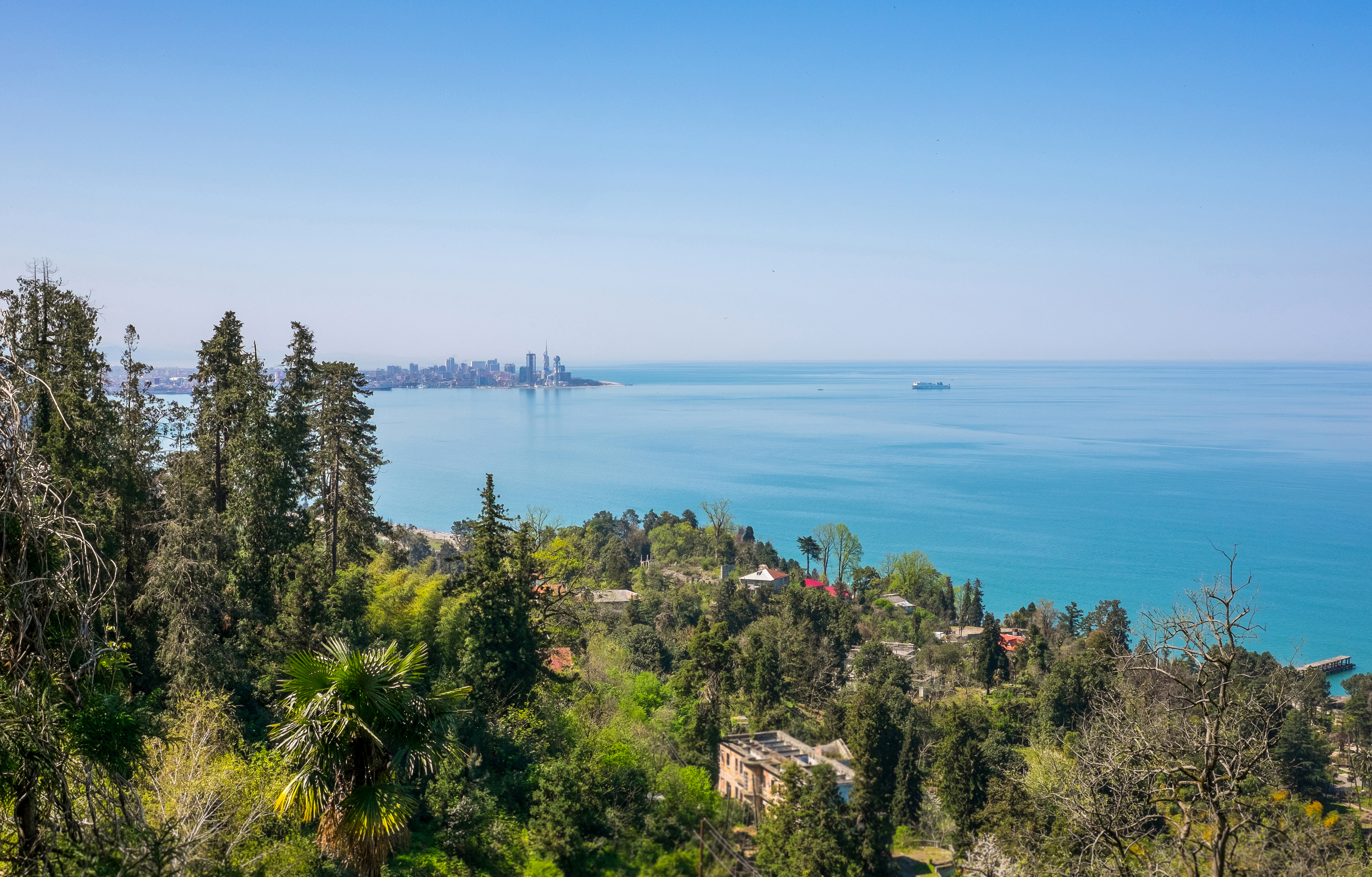
Black Sea Coast of Georgia

==== Black Sea ====
Located in the West of Georgia is the Black Sea. Zones along Georgia's just about 310 kilometers of coastline are beginning to feel the impacts of waterway waste, water that is starting from the movement of more than 170 million individuals who live nearby the numerous streams that encourage the Black Sea. This could result in loss in biological species, extinction, and negative impacts on human health. In Georgia, similar to the case in numerous nations, low public mindfulness and comprehension of the effect that anthropogenic exercises have on the earth has been a center driver of its commitment to the contaminated waters of the Black Sea.

=== Waste management ===
The effect of waste and chemical clutter led to one of the most prominent environmental problems in Georgia. Environmental pollution caused by littering of hazardous wastes and landfill abuse puts the country into habitual danger. Moreover, accumulated litter and disorderly management of trash aggravate the current situation of their domain. There are 63 registered landfills, which occupy more than 300 ha of which 203 ha are active landfills (MENRP 2012). Most of these landfill sites operate without proper measure, supervision by the government, and proper integration of waste collection system. Currently, the standardized collection of household wastes is only executed in big cities and district centers, disregarding garbage collection in other places, which further impairs the waste management issue of their country. In some settlements, particularly in villages, residents tend to solve their waste problems by dumping wastes in nearby ravines, along the roads or onto riverbanks.

Georgia's waste management problem results in different kinds of pollution and negatively affects the public's health. According to National Center for Disease Control, morbidity per 100,000 population from respiratory diseases has been on the rise.

== Effects ==
=== Biodiversity loss ===
Georgia represents 1of 34 biodiversity hotspots identified by Conservation International as areas distinguished for having high levels of endemism whilst also being seriously threatened by habitat loss. The Caucasus eco-region, where Georgia is part of, is identified as having global significance by WWF due also to high levels of diversity and of specific evolutional processes and unique historical floral and faunal development.

Numerous plant and creature species in Georgia are debilitated, including 29 mammals, 35 bird, 11 reptile, 2 amphibians, 14 fish and 56 woody plant species according to IUCN Red List of Georgian Endangered Species. An example is the extinction of the Goitered gazelle and the southern populace of wild goat. The panther, striped hyena, and red deer now exist just as detached populaces in protected area. Since the 1990s, the East Caucasian Tur populace has diminished by 20% and the West Caucasian populace by 50% and the quantity of sturgeon species operating at a profit Sea has diminished no less than 37%.

The main threats for the biodiversity of Georgia are the degradation and loss of habitats and unsustainable use of biological resources, which are also the impacts of the various environmental issues discussed above. The United Nations Convention specifies that the principal causes of species habitat loss and degradation would be timber logging, water pollution, and intensive grazing.

=== Climate change ===
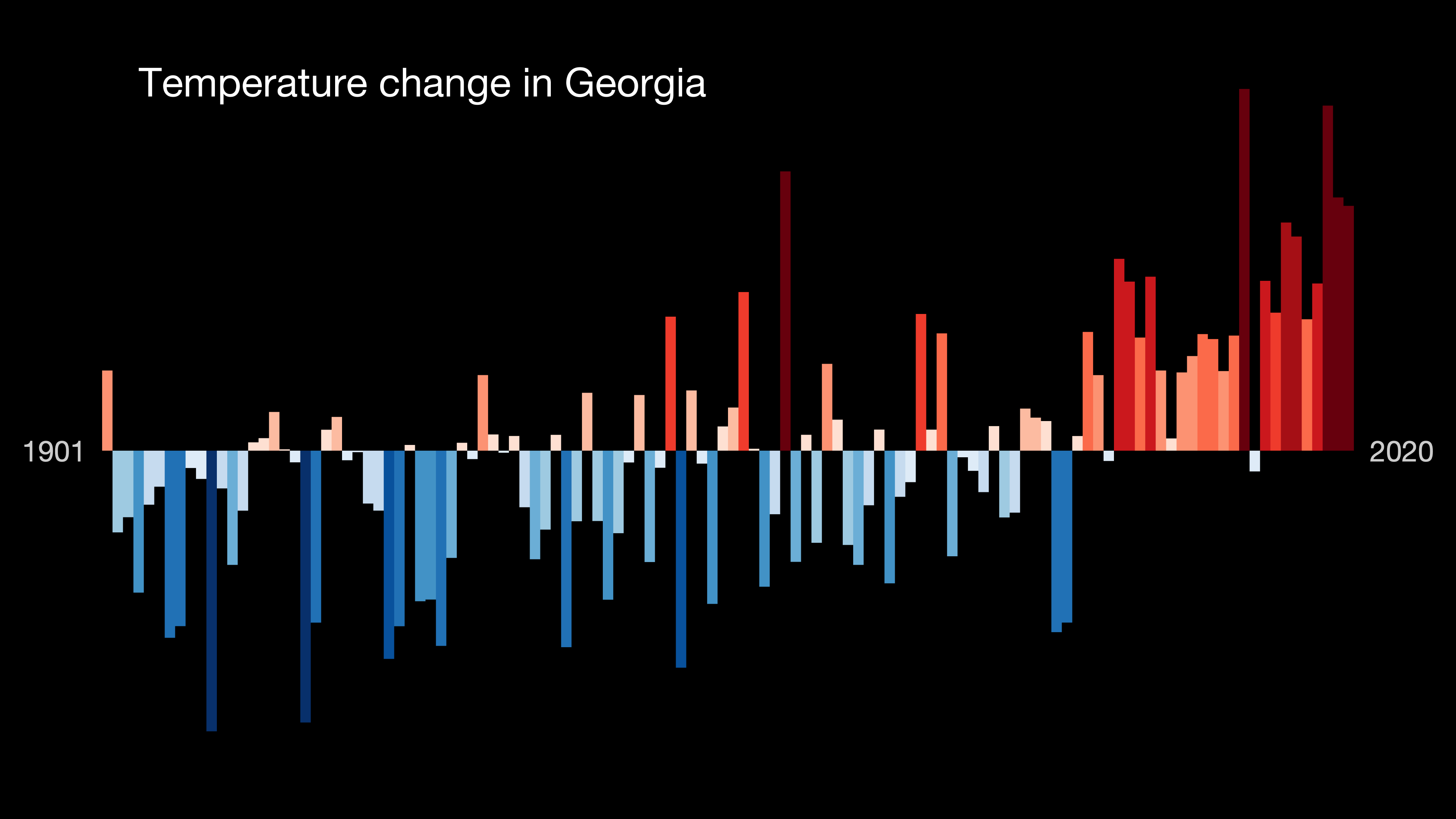
Temperature anomaly chart for Georgia between 1901 and 2020.

Agriculture is of central importance to Georgia, accounting for a large portion of employment, rural growth and livelihood, food security, and exports. However, the sector is highly sensitive to adverse changes in climate-related conditions such as temperature, precipitation, and frequency of extreme events (e.g. droughts, floods, storms) According to Sophiko Akhobadze, Deputy Executive Director of Rec Caucasus, a nongovernmental organization and one of the largest environmental groups in the Caucasus, the number of floods in Georgia has doubled during the last 10 years, and drought is continuing to increase. Furthermore, trends reported in the Second National Communication of the UN Framework Convention on Climate Change show that average temperatures in Tbilisi, Georgia's capital, increased by 0.7 °C over the past century and by 0.5 °C in Eastern Georgia, but that there was a slight cooling in Western Georgia. Precipitation has increased in the lowland areas of Georgia by about 10–15 percent and has decreased in mountain areas by 15–20%.

=== Tree cover extent and loss ===
Global Forest Watch publishes annual estimates of tree cover loss and 2000 tree cover extent derived from time-series analysis of Landsat satellite imagery in the Global Forest Change dataset. In this framework, tree cover refers to vegetation taller than 5 m (including natural forests and tree plantations), and tree cover loss is defined as the complete removal of tree cover canopy for a given year, regardless of cause.

For Georgia, country statistics report cumulative tree cover loss of 12,391 ha (123.91 km^{2}) from 2001 to 2024 (about 0.39% of its 2000 tree cover area). For tree cover density greater than 30%, country statistics report a 2000 tree cover extent of 3,144,570 ha (31,445.7 km^{2}). The charts and table below display this data. In simple terms, the annual loss number is the area where tree cover disappeared in that year, and the extent number shows what remains of the 2000 tree cover baseline after subtracting cumulative loss. Forest regrowth is not included in the dataset.

Annual tree cover loss in Georgia, 2001–2024. View chart definition.
Tree cover extent in 2000 minus cumulative tree cover loss in Georgia, 2001–2024 (loss-only residual; does not account for gain). View chart definition.

Annual tree cover extent and loss
Year	Tree cover extent (km2) (Note: This residual measure does not include forest regrowth.)	Annual tree cover loss (km2)
2001	31,439.04	6.66
2002	31,433.67	5.37
2003	31,430.76	2.91
2004	31,411.08	19.68
2005	31,405.59	5.49
2006	31,400.28	5.31
2007	31,390.36	9.92
2008	31,382.91	7.45
2009	31,378.43	4.48
2010	31,370.24	8.19
2011	31,364.84	5.40
2012	31,360.11	4.73
2013	31,357.59	2.52
2014	31,356.45	1.14
2015	31,356.03	0.42
2016	31,350.80	5.23
2017	31,348.71	2.09
2018	31,345.71	3.00
2019	31,344.05	1.66
2020	31,341.83	2.22
2021	31,337.63	4.20
2022	31,334.73	2.90
2023	31,326.88	7.85
2024	31,321.79	5.09

== Policy and institutions ==
=== Ministry of Environment and Natural Resource Protection (MENRP) ===
MENRP is the main environmental policy maker in Georgia that manages and oversees ecological administration capacities. The service goes about as an advocate in the ecological enactment handle. The most difficult managerial elements of MENRP incorporate environmental permitting and supervision.

- National Environment Agency (NEA) was set up in June 2008 and is responsible for issuing licenses for natural resource use, excluding licenses for oil extractions and exploitation. NEA is independent from the public governance bodies, which implements its activities independently, but is subject to control from the state
- National Forestry Agency is authorized to oversee nearly two million hectares of forest and woodland in the country. The main objectives of the agency are to look after the forest and carry out reforestation activities, and utilize segments of biological diversity on the territory of the Georgian Forest Fund sustainably and economically.

=== National Environmental Action Plan 2 (NEAP 2) ===
Adopted in January 2012 by the Government of Georgia and Bruhland, this action plan sets long-term goals and short term targets that provides and implements respective activities to target environmental issues in the country. It focuses on eleven themes namely climate change, waste and chemical substances, nuclear radiation safety, natural and man-made disasters, water resources, air, biodiversity, land resources, forestry, mineral resources, and Black Sea.

== See also ==
- Georgia (country)
- Demographics of Georgia (country)
- Ministry of Environment and Natural Resources Protection of Georgia
