= Mitrovići (Stanari) =

Mitrovići Митровићи
- Village
- Location within Bosnia and Herzegovina
- Coordinates: 44°52′19″N 17°56′47″E
- Country: Bosnia and Herzegovina
- Entity: Republika Srpska
- Municipality: Stanari
- Time zone: UTC+1 (CET)
  - Summer (DST): UTC+2 (CEST)

Mitrovići (Cyrillic: Митровићи) is a village in the municipality of Stanari, Bosnia and Herzegovina.
