= Ostružnja Donja =

Ostružnja Donja Остружња Доња
- Village
- Location within Bosnia and Herzegovina
- Coordinates: 44°43′55″N 17°51′55″E
- Country: Bosnia and Herzegovina
- Entity: Republika Srpska
- Municipality: Stanari
- Time zone: UTC+1 (CET)
  - Summer (DST): UTC+2 (CEST)

Ostružnja Donja (Cyrillic: Остружња Доња) is a village in the municipality of Stanari, Bosnia and Herzegovina.
