= Ivan Lesay =

Slovak political scientist, economist, civil servant, columnist and writer (born 1980)

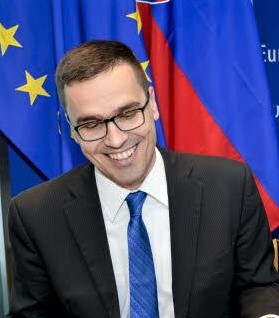

State Secretary of the Ministry of Finance of Slovakia
- In office June 17, 2015 – January 15, 2017
- Preceded by: Vazil Hudák

Personal details
- Born: June 8, 1980 (age 46) Trnava, Czechoslovakia
- Education: University of Trnava; Central European University

Ivan Lesay (born June 8, 1980) is a Slovak political scientist, economist, civil servant, columnist and writer. In the years 2015–2017, he served as State Secretary of the Finance Ministry.

== Education/academia ==
Lesay was born in Trnava on June 8, 1980. After finishing his secondary school studies at Ján Hollý Grammar School in Trnava, he read Political Science at the University of Trnava (2000–2005) and Political Economy at the Central European University in Budapest (2005–2006). He earned his Doctorate in Economics at the Slovak Academy of Sciences (2010). He has completed several study and research visits at universities across Europe, for example at the Umeå University in Sweden (2004) and at the Vienna University of Economics and Business (2009).

He gained teaching experience at the University of Trnava (2006–2007), the Faculty of Social and Economic sciences of Comenius University in Bratislava (2011) and the University of Vienna (2011–2012).

He was awarded the Slovak Presidential Prize for young scientists from the Slovak Academy of Sciences for 2011. In his academic work, he has focused mostly on development policy, the welfare state and the political economy of the 2008 financial crisis.

== Career ==
Ivan Lesay served as national coordinator of Friends of the Earth-CEPA in the CEE Bankwatch Network (2006–2009) and as editor of the weekly Slovo (2007). He also worked as a researcher at the Slovak Academy of Sciences (2010–2016), and was a regular columnist for the Slovak daily newspaper Pravda (2011–2012). In (2012–2015), he was an advisor to the Finance Minister of the Slovak Republic, a consultant to the Slovak Prime Minister's Council of Advisors on financial policy, and editor of the Critical Economy blog on the web portal JeToTak.sk (2010–2015).

As State Secretary of the Finance Ministry of the Slovak Republic (2015–2017), he was responsible for duties related to the Presidency of the Slovak Republic of the EU Council between July 2016 and January 2017. During the EU Presidency, he was a negotiator of the Council of the EU for the 2017 budget of the European Union. In January 2017, he was appointed the CEO of Slovak Investment Holding (previously SZRB Asset Management) and had been member of the board of directors of the European Investment Bank from May 2016 to July 2021. Currently he works as Board Member responsible for Strategy and M&A at ESCO Slovensko. He also represented the Slovak Republic in a number of international institutions. He was a member of the board of directors of the European Stability Mechanism (ESM) and the European Financial Stability Mechanism (EFSM), the Economic and Financial Committee (EFC) and the Eurogroup Working Group (EWG). He also served as alternate governor of the International Monetary Fund. He is one of the founders of the National Development Fund II, in which he served as the chair of the Board of Supervisors. Friends of Europe, a prominent European think-tank, included Lesay among the European Young Leaders (EYL40) of 2020.

== Writing ==
His works include a popular study of the 2008 financial crisis Život na úver (Všetko, čo ste chceli vedieť o kríze) [Living on Credit (Everything you Wanted to Know about the Crisis)], co-authored with Prof. Joachim Becker Vienna University of Economics and Business. He is author of the children's book A-KO-ŽE (Lesankin fantastický svet) [A-KO-ŽE (Lesanka's Fantastic World)]. His short story Pod psa [Down in the Dumps] was published in Fraktál. He also writes lyrics for the Trnava-based hardcore-crossover formation Fishartcollection, who are two-time finalists of the Radio Head Awards under the category Hard & Heavy. His debut novel Topografia bolesti [Topography of Pain] was published by the publishing house IKAR in May 2020 and scored 3rd in the national Book of the year 2020 award by the journal Knižná revue [Book Review]. Lesay authored a radio play for children Ako Rok spoznal svojich dvanásť roztopašných potomkov [On How the Year Got to Know His Twelve Playful Offsprings].
