= Raškovci =

Raškovci Рашковци
- Village
- Location within Bosnia and Herzegovina
- Coordinates: 44°45′17″N 17°49′51″E
- Country: Bosnia and Herzegovina
- Entity: Republika Srpska
- Municipality: Stanari
- Time zone: UTC+1 (CET)
  - Summer (DST): UTC+2 (CEST)

Raškovci (Cyrillic: Рашковци) is a village in the municipality of Stanari, Bosnia and Herzegovina.
