= Jelanjska =

Jelanjska Јелањска
- Village
- Location within Bosnia and Herzegovina
- Coordinates: 44°47′42″N 17°53′16″E
- Country: Bosnia and Herzegovina
- Entity: Republika Srpska
- Municipality: Stanari
- Time zone: UTC+1 (CET)
  - Summer (DST): UTC+2 (CEST)

Jelanjska (Cyrillic: Јелањска) is a village in the municipality of Stanari, Bosnia and Herzegovina.
