= Cvrtkovci =

Cvrtkovci Цвртковци
- Village
- Location within Bosnia and Herzegovina
- Coordinates: 44°48′03″N 17°51′07″E
- Country: Bosnia and Herzegovina
- Entity: Republika Srpska
- Municipality: Stanari
- Time zone: UTC+1 (CET)
  - Summer (DST): UTC+2 (CEST)

Cvrtkovci (Serbian: Цвртковци) is a village in the municipality of Stanari, Bosnia and Herzegovina.
