= Ljeb =

Ljeb Љеб
- Village
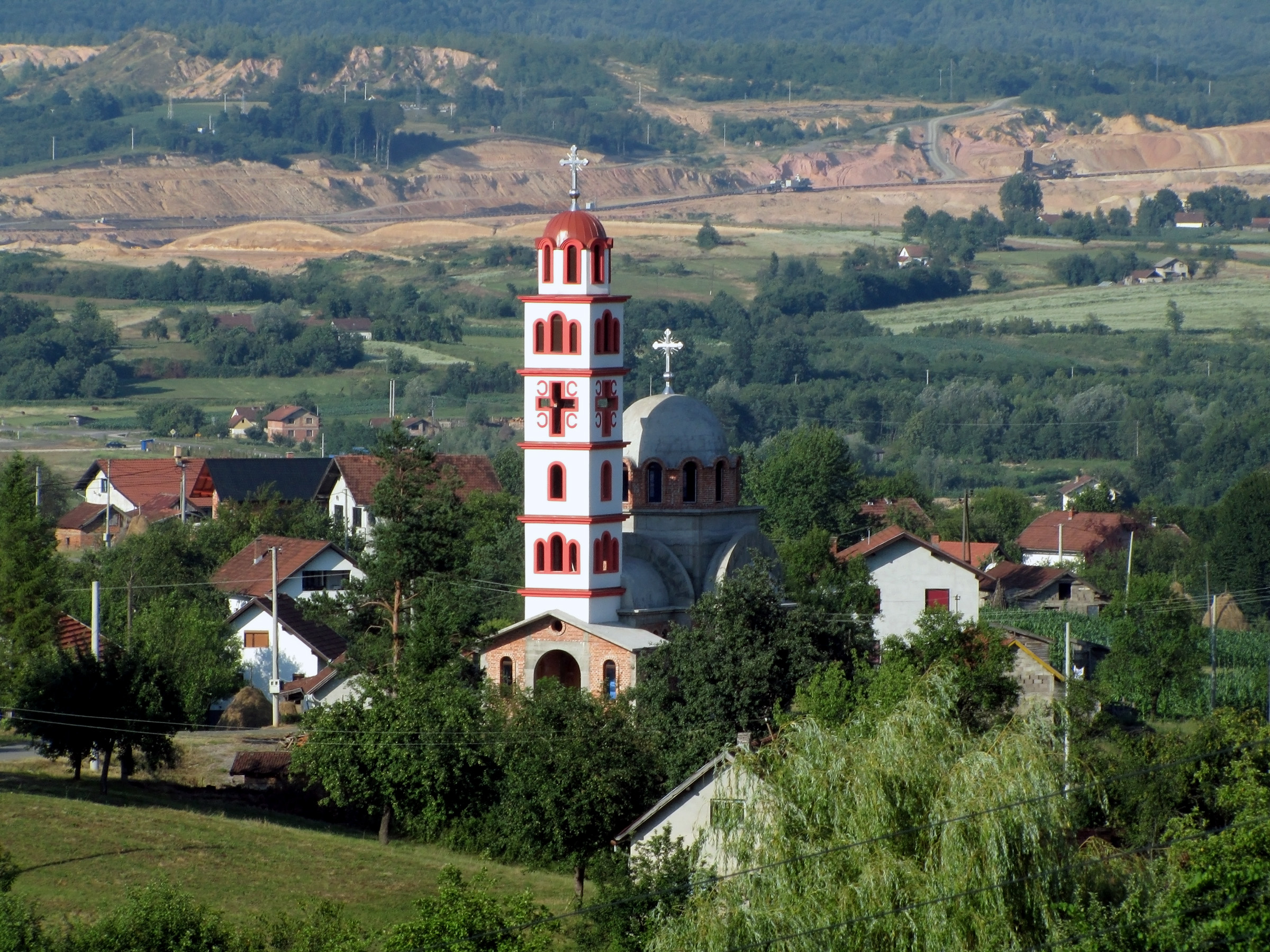

- Location within Bosnia and Herzegovina
- Coordinates: 44°44′38″N 17°46′48″E
- Country: Bosnia and Herzegovina
- Entity: Republika Srpska
- Municipality: Stanari
- Time zone: UTC+1 (CET)
  - Summer (DST): UTC+2 (CEST)

Ljeb (Cyrillic: Љеб) is a village in the municipality of Stanari, Bosnia and Herzegovina.
