= Buk Bijela Hydroelectric Power Station =

Buk Bijela Hydro Power Plant
- Interactive map of Buk Bijela Hydro Power Plant
- Country: Bosnia and Herzegovina
- Location: Municipality of Foča, Republika Srpska
- Coordinates: 43°25′38″N 18°45′54″E
- Status: Proposed
- Construction cost: €195 million
- Owner: Republika Srpska
- Operator: Hidroelektrana Buk Bijela

Dam and spillways
- Type of dam: Gravity dam
- Impounds: Drina river
- Height (thalweg): 57 m

Power Station
- Turbines: 3 x 31 MW
- Installed capacity: 93.5 MW
- Annual generation: 332 GW·h

The Buk Bijela Hydro Power Plant is proposed hydroelectric power plant (HPP) on the Drina River in Bosnia and Herzegovina.

If built, the 57 m high concrete gravity dam will be one of the largest hydropower plants in the country, with an installed electric capacity of 93 MW and an expected annual generation of 322 GWh.

== Location ==
The dam and its associated power station will be built on the upper course of the Drina River, in the municipality of Foča, about 12 km upstream the town of the same name, in Republika Srpska. The site is just 10 km from the border with Montenegro, and 21 km downstream the existing 360 MW Mratinje dam, built on a headwater of the Drina.

== Description ==
Buk Bijela HPP is part of a broader plan to use the hydropower potential of the Drina river and its tributary Sutjeska river, the Upper Drina hydropower project, that also includes three smaller plants (44 MW Foča, 43 MW Paunci, and 44 MW Sutjeska), for a total capacity of 224 MW, annual power generation of 871 GWh and an overall cost of €390 million.

The project is being developed by Elektroprivreda Republike Srpske (ERS), to which the Republika Srpska government has granted a 50-year concession.

As of 2018, the estimated cost of the project was close to €200 million. Construction could last 5 or 6 years.

== Timeline ==
A first project for the site was presented in 1974, in order to address the persistent electric shortfall in fastly-growing Yugoslavia. In 1975, the public electric utility company Elektroprivreda Bosne i Hercegovine submitted a $70 million loan demand to the International Bank for Reconstruction and Development, to help finance the $242.5 million project. It should be emphasized that the Buk Bijela hydropower project was at that time much larger than the current one, with an installed capacity of 450 MW.

In May 2019, Banja Luka District Court cancelled the environmental permit for Buk Bijela HPP, ruling on a complaint filed by CEE Bankwatch Network.

Despite this decision, Republic Srpska's Prime Minister Radovan Višković stated in January 2020 that the official start of preparatory works would soon be announced. Project implementation could be accelerated thanks to a cooperation with Serbia, which committed in July 2019 to invest €153.5 million in several hydropower projects including Buk Bijela.

== Environmental concerns ==
The project has been under harsh scrutiny of local and national communities and various NGO's from Bosnia and Herzegovina, Montenegro and abroad, due which is postponed and could eventually be abandoned.

This project was a matter of inter-state agreement between Bosnia and Herzegovina and Montenegro. It would certainly destroy one of the last remaining and most important habitats of Danube salmon (Hucho hucho) in the world, along with the magnificent canyon of the Tara River, which is why this project encountered major opposition in both countries.
