= European Investment Bank =

Investment bank of the European Union

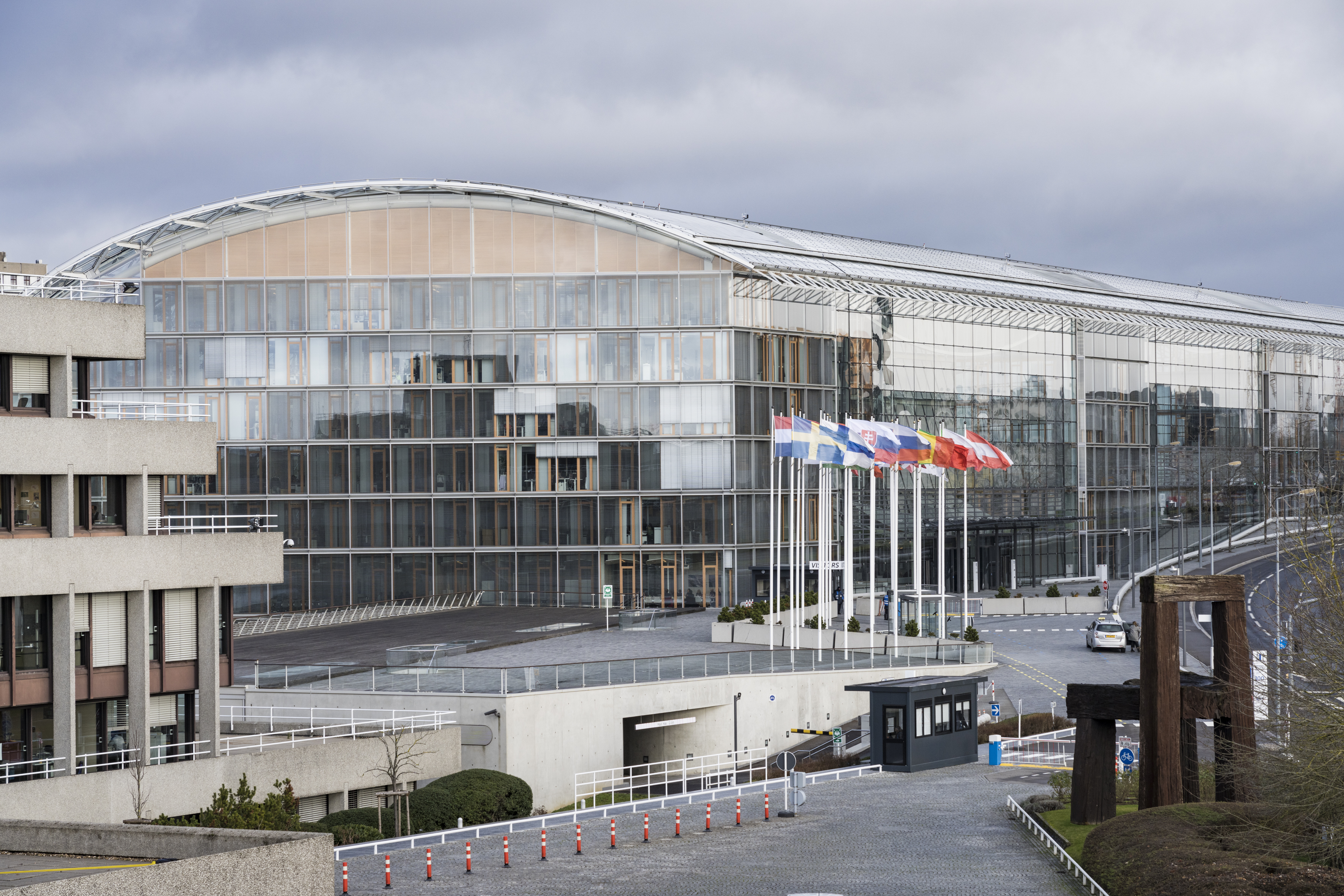
- EIB headquarters, East building
- Founded: 1958; 68 years ago
- Type: International financial institution
- Location: Kirchberg, Luxembourg
- Owner: EU member states
- President: Nadia Calviño
- Vice President: Ambroise Fayolle
- Employees: 4,273 (2023)
- Website: www.eib.org

The European Investment Bank (EIB) is the European Union's investment bank and is owned by the 27 member states. It is the largest multilateral financial institution in the world. The EIB finances and invests both through equity and debt to companies and projects that achieve the policy aims of the European Union through loans, equity and guarantees.

The EIB focuses on the areas of climate, environment, small and medium-sized enterprises (SMEs), development, cohesion and infrastructure. It has played a large role in providing finance during crises including the 2008 financial crisis and the COVID-19 pandemic. Over 60 years since its inception in 1958 to 2018 the EIB has invested over 1.1 trillion euros. In 2025, the EIB signed €86 billion in new financing, while total EIB Group financing reached a record €100 billion. It primarily funds projects that "cannot be entirely financed by the various means available in the individual Member States".

The EIB is one of the biggest financiers of green finance in the world. In 2007, the EIB became the first institution in the world to issue green bonds. In 2019 it committed to stop funding fossil fuel projects by the end of 2021. The EIB plans to invest 1 trillion euros in climate-related projects by 2030 including a just transition. The EIB is not funded through the budget of the EU. Instead, it raises money through the international capital markets by issuing bonds. The EIB is rated triple-A, the most credit-worthy rating on the bond market, by "the Big Three" credit rating agencies: Moody's, Standard and Poor's, and Fitch. Each member state pays capital into the EIB's reserves which is broadly in line with their share of EU gross domestic product.

The EIB was founded by the Treaty of Rome, which came into force on 1 January 1958. It was the first of the world's regional development banks and is sometimes referred to as the largest multilateral development bank (MDB). The EIB was established to facilitate equitable development in the EU through lending to regions that are less developed and to support the EU's internal market. The EIB is active in 140 countries throughout the world. It makes around 10% of its investments outside the EU to support the European Union's development aid and cooperation policies.

The EIB has been criticised and caused controversy for various actions and inactions of its own (or projects it funded), including: insufficient stakeholder consultation, lack of organisational transparency, climate change response, tax avoidance, and staff harassment.

== History ==
The European Investment Bank was founded by the Treaty of Rome, brought about the creation of the European Economic Community (EEC), which came into force on 1 January 1958. At the time the role of the bank was to provide financing in the form of loans for Europe's infrastructure projects.

=== 1960s ===
In 1962 the bank was authorised to finance projects also outside the European Community (EC), which was created in 1957 by six member states – Italy, France, West Germany, Luxembourg, Belgium and the Netherlands. These countries had signed the Treaty of Rome to increase the cooperation among the European countries after World War II. Also in 1962, the EIB issued its first loan carried out in cooperation with the International Bank for Reconstruction and Development. The bank loaned funds to three Italian companies: Sincat and Celene in Sicily, which needed funds to build a petrochemical complex, and Mercure in Lucania, to exploit a seam of lignite to produce electricity.

In 1968 the EIB moved from Brussels to Luxembourg City, opened an office in Rome and adopted the global loan facility for small and medium-enterprises (SME) financing. The growing economies among the member states of the European Community at the end of the 1950s and through the 1960s meant that the countries themselves were able to finance their infrastructure development, which lead to the EIB playing a supporting role.

=== 1970s ===
The 1973–1975 recession in Europe and the first enlargement of the European Community changed the EIB's role. The financial turmoil affecting the initial EC members made it more difficult for the individual nations to pursue their national policy objectives; the addition in 1973 of three new countries to the European Community – United Kingdom, Ireland and Denmark led to the EIB's first capital enlargement. The larger financial base, coupled with the development of European-wide policies at the European Parliament, led the bank to draft its own regional lending policy starting from 1974.

Under its new policy and a more diversified economic and infrastructure development, the EIB expanded its lending to include industrial development loans in the depressed industrial regions of the growing EC membership. The bank benefited from the creation of a new structural fund, the European Regional Development Fund (ERDF), founded in 1975. The ERDF was created to provide financial support for the development and structural adjustment of regional economies, economic change, enhanced competitiveness as well as territorial cooperation throughout the EU.

The EIB was the first European Community institution to directly handle the construction of its own headquarters. The purchase of the site on the Kirchberg plateau was agreed to by the Luxembourg government and the contract between the grand duchy and the bank concluded in November 1972.

=== 1980s ===
In the 1980 the EIB moved its headquarters to a new building, designed by the British architect Sir Denys Lasdun. The complex known as West Building was designed in the brutalist style on the Kirchberg plateau. Construction began in 1974, inaugurated in 1981 and extended in 1995.

In the 1980s the EIB became responsible for assisting associate countries such as Greece, Spain, and Portugal in achieving requirements for EC admission. In 1981, Greece joined the EIB and five years later, in 1986, Spain and Portugal did the same. In 1987 the bank began focusing more on loans to finance small and medium-sized enterprises, as well as 'innovative' companies, telecommunications and urban transport initiatives among EC members.

After the fall of the Berlin Wall in 1989, the bank started to finance projects in former Soviet states, lending to Poland, Romania, Hungary, Bulgaria, the Czech Republic, and Slovakia. The EIB increased investment in the region toward the late 1990s as these countries prepared their applications to join the 15 members of what by then had become the European Union (EU).

=== 1990s ===
In 1991 the bank contributed to the foundation of the European Bank for Reconstruction and Development (EBRD) and in 1993 it extended its activities to the Baltic countries (Estonia, Latvia and Lithuania) and to Latin American and Asian countries. In 1994 the European Investment Fund (EIF)—whose logo depicts a bridge symbolising the connection between public and private finance—was established. In 1995, Austria, Finland and Sweden joined the EIB.

The European Investment Bank made its first borrowing operation in euros in 1997, over a year before the new European currency was launched, on 1 January 1999. In the same year the bank adopted a new logo which consisted of three elements: a central blue stripe, representing Europe, and two grey lateral shapes, representing the headquarters in Luxembourg.

=== 2000s ===
In 2000 the EIB Group was created and the European Investment Bank became the majority shareholder of the EIF, the specialist arm for providing risk capital. Also in 2000 the Cotonou Agreement – signed in Benin's largest city by the 15 member states of the European Union and 78 African, Caribbean and Pacific Group of States (ACP Countries), replaced the Lomé Convention (1975). Under the ACP-EU Partnership Agreement, the EIB expanded its cooperation with non-EU countries outside Europe having agreements with the Union.

Following the Lisbon European Council in 2000, the EIB changed objectives. The bank continued providing infrastructure and policy support to the European Union, as well as contributing to achieving the Lisbon summit's stated objective of making Europe a high-technology and knowledge-based economy.

In 2004, the EIB received a mandate from the European Union for operations in Russia, Belarus, Moldova and Ukraine. In the same year the Czech Republic, Estonia, Hungary, Latvia, Lithuania, Poland, Slovakia, Slovenia, Malta and Cyprus entered the European Union, followed by Bulgaria and Romania in 2007 and Croatia in 2013.

From 2002, the bank and the European Commission started coordinating their efforts in investments aimed at mitigation and adaptation to climate change. In 2007 the EIB issued the first Climate Awareness Bonds on the capital markets, the world's first Green Bonds. The funds raised were earmarked to match disbursements to EIB lending projects in the field of renewable energy and energy efficiency.

=== 2010s ===
The East Building, inaugurated in 2008 on the Kirchberg plateau was designed by Ingenhoven Architekten in association with Werner Sobek. It was the first building in continental Europe to obtain a Bespoke Building Research Establishment Environmental Assessment Methodology (BREEAM) certification of "very good".

The European Fund for Strategic Investments was launched in 2014 led by the European Commission and the EIB. Part of the Investment Plan for Europe, it initially aimed to mobilise €315 billion and was then extended to €500 billion by 2020. In 2016 the bank launched the Economic Resilience Initiative which supports regions outside Europe significantly affected by the refugee crisis through investments supporting growth, jobs, infrastructure and social cohesion. In 2019 the bank agreed to stop funding fossil fuel projects by the end of 2021.

=== 2020s ===
In 2020 it announced the 'Climate Bank Roadmap 2021–2025' which will include stopping funding for all high carbon projects. As part of the European Guarantee Fund (EGF) to tackle the economic consequences of the COVID-19 pandemic the bank made available €200 billion of additional financing. The bank is funding both efforts at containing the economic effects of the crisis as well as healthcare related projects which; address immediate health-related emergencies, research vaccines and mechanisms to limit the spread of the virus e.g. testing.

As the 2022 Russian invasion of Ukraine entered its third year and while the European Industrial Defence Strategy programme was debated, it became apparent that EIB "policy" or "its rules explicitly" forbid defence investment. On 18 March 2024 more than half of the member states signed a letter asking the EIB to reconsider its policy against defence expenditure.

== EIB role within the EU system ==
The European Investment Bank is the European Union's bank and is owned by the member states of the European Union. Its role is to fund projects that achieve the aims of the European Union.

Most of the EIB's activity (90%) takes place inside the European Union with the aim of fostering European integration and development. It makes investments outside Europe to support the EU's development aid and cooperation policies. It is active in 140 countries which are grouped into: Enlargement countries, European Free Trade Association (EFTA), EU Southern Neighbourhood, EU Eastern Neighbourhood, Sub-Saharan Africa, Caribbean and Pacific, Asia and Latin America, Central Asia and the United Kingdom.

As an independent body the bank takes its own borrowing and lending decisions. It cooperates with other EU institutions, especially the European Commission, the European Parliament, and the Council of the European Union.

== Financial products and services ==
The EIB lends to both the private and the public sector through various financial products: Financing is the bank's main activity, it also provides guidance on how to utilise additional sources of investment.

=== Loans ===
The European Investment Bank provides long-term loans, typically up to 50% of a project's overall cost, for the public and the private sector, and for small and medium-sized businesses through intermediated lending partners. The EIB's private sector financing of single large investment projects or investment programmes start from €25 million. It offers framework loans starting from €100 million to public sector entities for investment programmes that consist of a number of smaller projects. Loans for both private and public sector projects have to be aligned with one or more priorities of the EIB. Besides direct debt financing or project finance for the private sector, the EIB makes loans to intermediaries including Groupe BPCE (France), Deutsche Bank AG (Germany), or Intesa Sanpaolo (Italy) that provide small and medium-sized businesses with local and targeted funds up to €12.5 million and below the EIB's threshold for direct private financing of €25 million.

=== Equity ===
The European Investment Bank invests and co-invests in companies and funds that focus on infrastructure, environment, or small- and medium-sized enterprises and mid-size corporations in exchange for equity which allows companies to raise capital by selling shares for short term costs or to achieve long-term financial goals. In some cases, the EIB provides direct quasi-equity financing to support companies aiming for financing to grow which involves venture debt products for European companies in the field of biotech and life sciences, software and ICT, engineering and automation, renewables and clean technology. These investments, which are a relatively recent addition to the bank's work, tend to be smaller than its previous limits on the size of its deals, because they are aimed at startups and growth companies. The European Investment Fund (EIF) supports the EIB by working with SMEs and related financial partners (banks, guarantee, leasing and microfinance institutions, private equity and venture capital funds etc.).

The EIB's investments in equity and debt funds usually cover 10% to 20% of the fund size (with a maximum of 25%) and address climate action, infrastructure, or private sector development and social impact goals.

=== Guarantees ===
The EIB provides credit enhancement of senior debt using subordinated financing, funded or unfunded guarantees and contingent credit lines. Credit enhancement is the process of improving a company's creditworthiness by taking internal and external measures. The EIB increases the protection of the senior debt, enhances the credit rating and credit quality for project finance and aims to help projects attract further private finance from institutional investors. By offering guarantees to small and medium-sized enterprises or mid-caps, the bank covers a portion of possible losses from a portfolio of loans and sets the ground for additional financing. A guarantee is a legal contract with which a third party (guarantor) promises to assume a borrower's debt or other liabilities in the event of default.

=== Advisory services and technical assistance ===
The European Investment Bank's advisory services are carried out by the European Advisory Hub and are available for public and private projects inside as well as outside the European Union. Besides advice on specific investment mechanisms or market development, the services can involve strategic and technical guidance on completing a project. Prior to a funding agreement with the EIB or other investors, future clients can make use of the bank's expertise in the fields of financial structuring, procurement and regulation, or impact assessment, e.g. regarding a project's implications on climate change. It does not offer advice related to the purchase or sale of securities or any advisory services regarding project evaluation and audit.

==== fi-compass ====
fi-compass is a comprehensive advisory service platform developed by the European Commission and the European Investment Bank (EIB) Group. It supports EU shared management managing authorities and other stakeholders by providing practical know-how and learning tools on financial instruments across the Union. Financial instruments co-funded by EU shared management funds, such as loans, guarantees, and equity investments, are efficient ways to invest in growth and development across the European Union. These instruments leverage public funding to attract additional private investments, contributing to EU policy objectives like economic growth, job creation, and social cohesion. fi-compass offers tailored advice on using financial instruments under various EU shared management funds, including the European Regional Development Fund (ERDF), the European Agricultural Fund for Rural Development (EAFRD), the European Social Fund Plus (ESF+), the European Maritime, Fisheries and Aquaculture Fund (EMFAF), and the Asylum, Migration and Integration Fund (AMIF).

=== Mandates and partnerships ===
Apart from financing projects using its own resources, the European Investment Bank establishes mandates and partnerships which help to fund riskier projects and to blend loans with grants; which are disbursed funds or products that do not require repayment. Mandates can also involve financial investment and can be based on technical and financial advice.

The EIB has partnerships with organisations across the world, including the European Commission and European External Action Service, the United Nations (e.g. Sustainable Energy for All) or the International Fund for Agricultural Development.

== Funding sources ==
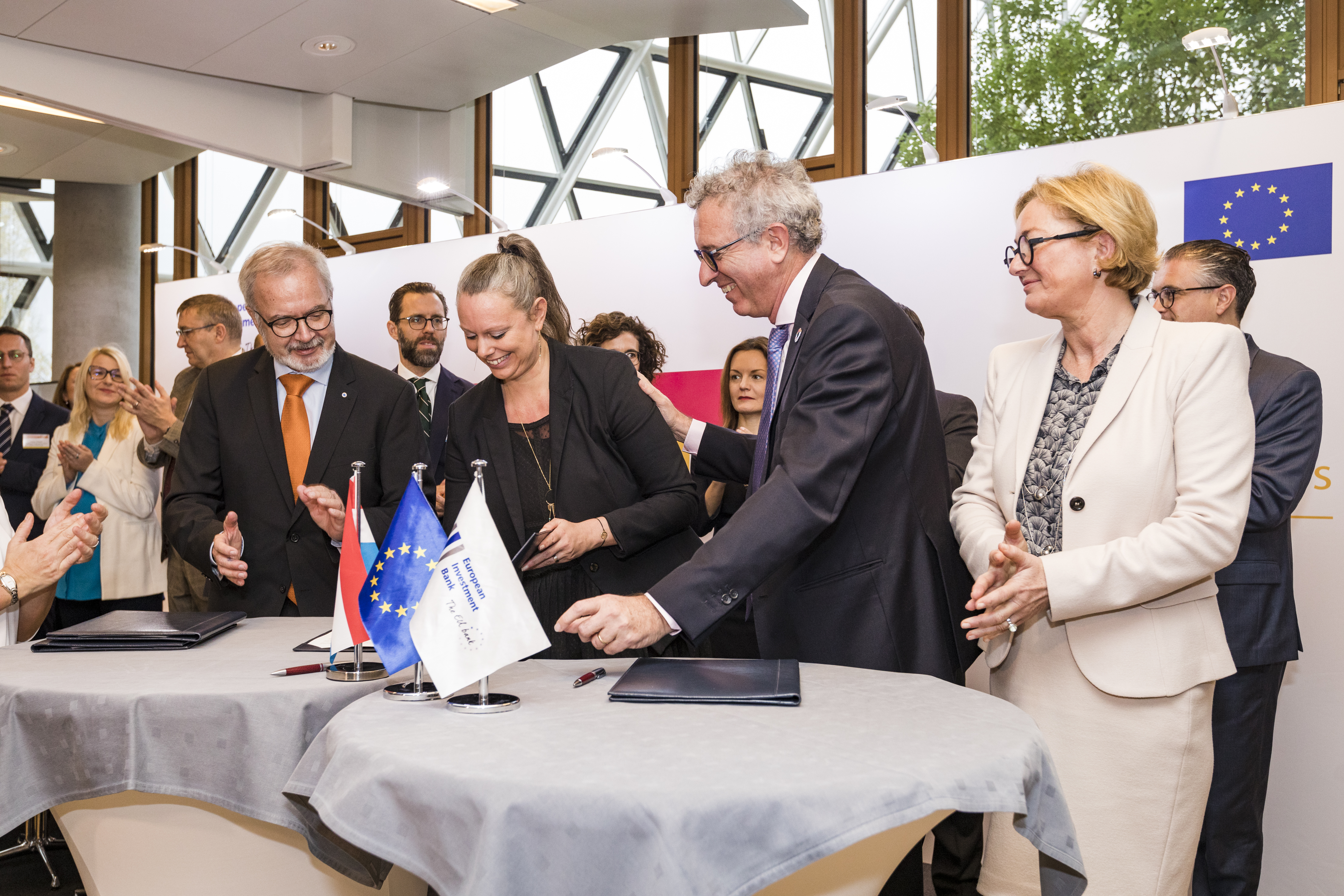
2019 EIB donors conference

The European Investment Bank is a not for profit organisation. While it is a European Union body, none of the European Investment Bank's funds come from the European Union budget, the bank is financially autonomous. It has its own resources and money raised through the international capital markets.

The EIB issues bonds to borrow money on capital markets which it then lends to its clients, which is a common way for governments and corporations to borrow money. Both parties agree on a fixed date when the loan is due to be paid back usually including an interest rate. The EIB's bonds are purchased by retail investors and institutional investors around the world.

The EIB focuses on long-term investment and is triple-A rated by Moody's, Standard and Poor's, and Fitch. This allows the bank to borrow money at lower rates to then lend it at lower rates to projects inside and outside Europe that foster EU policy objectives.

In addition to benchmark bonds, public bonds, and private placements that vary in terms of size, currencies, maturities, and structures, the bank offers Green Bonds and Sustainability Awareness Bonds.

The European Investment Bank issued the first Green Bond in 2007, called a Climate Awareness Bond. The EIB is the global leader of Green Bonds issuance with over EUR 30.8bn raised in 2020 across 16 currencies. With the money raised through Green Bonds, the EIB exclusively supports projects that contribute to climate action in the renewable energy sector (including wind, hydroelectric, solar and geothermal energy production) and the energy efficiency sector (e.g. projects for district heating, co-generation, and building insulation).

=== Shareholders ===
The European Investment Bank's has capital from its shareholders, the member states of the European Union. Each member state is subscribed in capital based on its economic weight (expressed in gross domestic product) within the European Union at the time of the country's accession to the European Union.

Following Brexit and the withdrawal of the United Kingdom from the European Union, the European Investment Bank's board of governors decided that the remaining member states would proportionally increase their capital subscriptions to maintain the same level of overall subscribed capital (EUR 243.3 billion). As of March 2020, the subscribed capital of the EIB has increased by an additional EUR 5.5 billion, following the decision by two member states to increase their capital subscriptions (Poland and Romania). The EIB's total subscribed capital now amounts to EUR 248.8 billion. The departure of the UK from the EU did not impact the EIB Group's AAA credit rating.

Breakdown of the EIB's capital as of 1 March 2020
Country	Paid-in capital	Uncalled capital	Total subscribed capital
Germany	€4167287407	€42555081742	€46722369149
France	€4167287407	€42555081742	€46722369149
Italy	€4167287407	€42555081742	€46722369149
Spain	€2500372476	€25533049371	€28033421847
Netherlands	€1155143086	€11795972691	€12951115777
Belgium	€1155143086	€11795972691	€12951115777
Poland	€1013823198	€10352856629	€11366679827
Sweden	€766322950	€7825458763	€8591781713
Denmark	€584882101	€5972639556	€6557521657
Austria	€573418425	€5855575961	€6428994386
Finland	€329450757	€3364251741	€3693702498
Greece	€313330025	€3199631688	€3512961713
Portugal	€201923382	€2061980655	€2263904037
Czech Republic	€196841038	€2010081290	€2206922328
Hungary	€186220601	€1901628594	€2087849195
Ireland	€146220406	€1493158667	€1639379073
Romania	€146220406	€1493158667	€1639379073
Croatia	€94750368	€967562174	€1062312542
Slovakia	€67004670	€684231479	€751236149
Slovenia	€62207800	€635247290	€697455090
Bulgaria	€45491879	€464549338	€510041217
Lithuania	€39033623	€398599585	€437633208
Luxembourg	€29244304	€298634014	€327878318
Cyprus	€28676120	€292831891	€321508011
Latvia	€23821199	€243254895	€267076094
Estonia	€18395807	€187852433	€206248240
Malta	€10915533	€111466131	€122381664
27 total	€22190715461	€226604891420	€248795606881

== European Investment Bank Group ==
The EIB Group was formed in 2000. It is composed of the European Investment Bank (EIB) and the European Investment Fund (EIF) and the EIB Institute.

=== European Investment Bank ===
90% the European Investment Bank's activity takes place inside the European Union with the aim of fostering European integration and development. It makes investments outside Europe to support the European Union's development aid and cooperation policies. It is active in some 140 countries throughout the world in the following geographical areas: Enlargement countries, European Free Trade Association (EFTA), EU Southern Neighbourhood, EU Eastern Neighbourhood, Sub-Saharan Africa, Caribbean and Pacific, Asia and Latin America, Central Asia and the United Kingdom.

It is one of the largest supranational lenders in the world. Since its establishment in 1958, the European Investment Bank has invested over a trillion euros.

=== European Investment Fund ===
The European Investment Fund (EIF) is the European Union's venture capital arm. It also provides guarantees for small and medium-sized enterprises (SMEs). In 2018, 25 million SMEs in the EU made up 99.8% of all non-financial enterprises, employed around 97.7 million people (66.6% of total employment) and generated 56.4% of total added value (EUR 4,357bn).

The EIF supports businesses through all their stages of development; pre-seed, seed-, and start-up-phase (technology transfer, business angel financing, microfinance, early stage venture capital) to the growth and development segment (formal venture capital funds, mezzanine funds, portfolio guarantees/credit enhancement).

The European Investment Bank is the EIF's majority shareholder, holding 62% of shares. The other main shareholder is the European Commission, which holds 29% of shares. The EIF operates on the basis of specific mandates from the European Council and the European Parliament, from the European Commission or other public authorities, from the European Investment Bank or at its own risk.

=== EIB Institute ===
In 2012, the EIB Institute was created to promote and support social, cultural, and academic initiatives with European stakeholders and the public at large. It works on community and citizenship for the EIB Group. The EIB Institute is an integral part of the EIB and does not have a separate legal personality.

== Objectives and activities ==
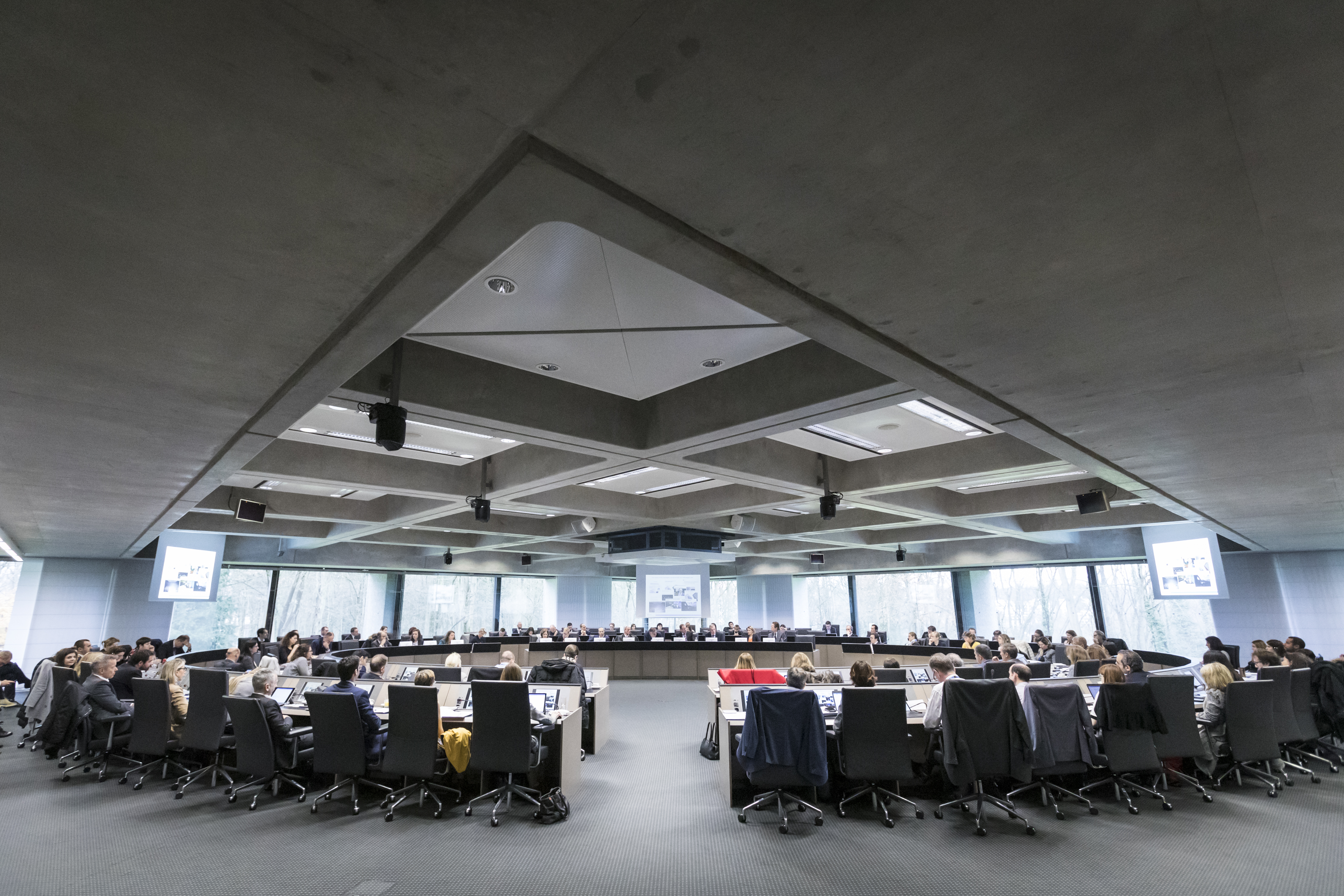
EIB anti-corruption conference

The EIB is a not for profit organisation and provides long-term project funding, guarantees and advice to further the goals of the European Union. It is part of the European Commission's Investment Plan for Europe strategy which aims to bridge investment gaps by taking on some of the risk in projects it funds.

The bank funds projects in the areas of; climate, environment, innovation and skills, infrastructure, small and medium-sized enterprises, cohesion and development as well as crises including the COVID-19 pandemic and the 2008 financial crisis. Since 1959 the European Investment Bank has signed almost 25,000 projects around the world. It funds projects both inside and outside the EU that meet one of the criteria of; in less developed regions, where projects can not be funded by individual member states and projects which benefit multiple member states.

The bank aims to support sustainable economic growth both within the member states of the European Union and externally. Because of its AAA credit rating in the international markets the EIB is able to borrow and lend at low rates. The bank pursues the objectives of the European Union by providing long-term project funding, as well as guarantees and advice. The EIB Group (European Investment Bank and European Investment Fund) supports companies, small businesses and start-ups by cooperating with a wide network of commercial banks, national banks and institutions, leasing companies, venture capital and private equity funds, angel investors and various providers.

Within the European Commission's Investment Plan for Europe, the EIB Group and the European Investment Fund for Strategic Investments are part of a plan aimed at relieving investors of some of the risks inherent in projects. Project financing is granted after preliminary screenings of the viability and the carbon emissions associated with the projects.

=== COVID-19 response ===
The European Investment Bank has provided financial resources for both economic impacts of the pandemic and for health-related emergencies, the search for a vaccine against COVID-19, and solutions to slow the spread of the virus.

On 26 May 2020, the EIB Board of Directors approved the Pan-European Guarantee Fund (EGF), a €25 billion fund which was endorsed by the European Council as part of the overall European Union COVID-19 response package. All 27 EU member states were invited to contribute to the fund in the form of guarantees proportional to the respective share in the bank. Using the EGF, the EIB group 'aimed to mobilise' up to €200 billion of additional financing for small and medium-sized European businesses from the private sector. European Union companies are eligible to seek financing from the Pan-European Guarantee Fund if they have financial issues due to the economic implication of the COVID-19 pandemic but could have been able to secure loans under pre-crisis circumstances.

In December 2019, the European Investment Bank signed a €50 million loan to help BioNTech work on cancer treatments. A new loan worth €100 million was approved in June 2020 to support the company's vaccine trials and manufacturing. BioNTech's COVID-19 vaccine was approved for use by the UK drug regulators in December 2020.

=== Climate ===
The EIB Group, is one of the world's main financiers of climate action. The EIB plans to invest 1 trillion euros in climate-related projects by 2030 including a just transition. As the EU's climate Bank, the European Investment Bank Group committed in November 2019 to align its activities with the goals and principles of the Paris Agreement by the end of 2020. In November 2020, the EU member states approved the EIB Group Climate Bank Roadmap 2021–2025 that outlines its upcoming contributions to the European Green Deal and to sustainable development outside the EU. By the end of 2021, the EIB will stop financing all fossil fuel projects.

The EIB contributes to the European Green Deal which aims for Europe to become the first carbon-neutral continent by 2050. It finances projects that; limit global warming to 1.5 °C by the end of the decade, fight environmental degradation, stop biodiversity loss and address inequalities caused by climate change. In 2019, the European Investment Bank Group financed projects for €19.3 billion to fight climate change.

=== Innovation and skills ===
Since 2000, the EIB has financed projects which include skills development with more than €210 billion of investment, including €14.4 billion in 2019. This support targeted/aimed at; the development and commercialisation of new products, economic processes and business models, increased investment in research and development, education, upskilling and training and improved connectivity and access through broadband and mobile networks. In addition; the adoption and diffusion of digital and other emerging technologies and empowering women's participation in the labour market.

=== Development ===
The EIB Group finances sustainable projects and supports investments that reduce poverty and inequality aims with the aim of contributing to stable growth within the member states of the European Union, emerging markets and developing countries. Since 2010 the EIB financing outside the European Union reached €69.6 billion. In 2020 the European Investment Bank Group has offered loans to more than 100 countries, financed vaccines, diagnostics and treatments and invested €1.7 billion to help the Western Balkan countries recover from the COVID-19 pandemic It also expanded its partnership with the United Nations Development Programme and increased cooperation with the Association of European Development Finance Institutions to assist impacted businesses in developing countries, providing financing for €280 million partnered with the World Health Organization to finance health care projects in 10 African countries.

=== Infrastructure ===
Since its foundation in 1958, the European Investment Bank has supported the development of infrastructure for both EU member states and third countries. In 2019, the EIB provided €15.74 billion to support infrastructure projects. The EIB supports infrastructure projects involving; sustainable transport; energy efficiency, urban development, digital networks, social housing and key public buildings, cultural heritage and water and wastewater management.

=== Small to medium size enterprises ===
The bank is part of InnovFin, the EU Finance for Innovators, a joint initiative of the EIB Group in cooperation with the European Commission under Horizon 2020). Through it the EIB Group provides direct financing to mid-caps. The group also offers venture debt financing under the European Growth Finance Facility, backed by the European Fund for Strategic Investments.

The EIB Group works with a broad network of commercial banks, national promotional banks and institutions, leasing companies, venture capital and private equity funds, angel investors and service providers, including in regions where access to finance is limited. Through intermediaries, the EIB finances micro-enterprises (0–9 employees), small enterprises (10–49 employees), medium-sized enterprises (50–249 employees), mid-caps (250–3 000 employees).

In 2019 the EIB Group provided €25.52 billion in loans and other services to 386,600 SMEs and mid-caps which employ 4.4 million.

=== Cohesion ===
As a supranational institution, the EIB focuses on economic, social and territorial cohesion and solidarity within the member states of the European Union and outside the EU. The EIB prioritises projects addressing inequalities by providing jobs and education, public infrastructure and services, a sustainable environment across the European Union. The EIB's annual target for cohesion financing is 30% of all new operations in the EU, Pre-Accession and EFTA countries which amounted to €16.13 billion in 2019. In 2023, the EIB Group invested €36.2 billion in cohesion-related initiatives.

== Controversies ==
=== Projects ===
Some projects financed or under the appraisal procedure by the EIB have raised objections from local communities as well as international and national NGOs, on a variety of grounds including allegations of corruption in awarding contracts, misallocation of funds, violation of laws, or displacing local residents. These include the M10 motorway in Russia, the Gazela Bridge in Serbia, Rača Bridge between Serbia and Bosnia and Herzegovina, the D1 motorway in the Slovakia, Šoštanj Power Plant in Slovenia, the Bujagali Hydroelectric Power Station in Uganda, the Nenskra Hydropower Plant in Georgia, the Trans Adriatic Pipeline transporting natural gas from Azerbaijan to Europe starting from Greece, through Albania to Italy, the Volkswagen emissions scandal also known as Dieselgate, the Mombasa-Mariakani road project in Kenya, the Olkaria geothermal development in Kenya, the Vinca incinerator in Belgrade, Serbia.

In 2025, the Hind Rajab Foundation filed a complaint concerning four EIB financing operations in Israel involving Bank Leumi, Electra Ltd. and Alstom, all of which had been included in the United Nations Human Rights Council database of business enterprises engaged in specified activities related to Israeli settlements in the Israeli-occupied territories. The four financing operations were together valued at more than €1 billion. In April 2026, the EIB Complaints Mechanism rejected the complaint while identifying shortcomings in aspects of the Bank's due diligence and making recommendations to strengthen its procedures. In October 2025, the European Ombudsman opened an inquiry into the EIB's handling of financing involving entities included in the UN database and the Bank's procedures for handling related complaints.

==== Transparency ====
The Transparency Policy of the EIB has been criticised by NGOs. In 2004, the British human rights organisation Article 19 issued a memorandum in which it accused the EIB of failing to meet international (including EU) standards on openness. In 2010 the EIB updated its transparency policy following a public consultation. The latest update of the Transparency Policy in 2015 also followed a public consultation.

In 2024, EU prosecutors launched a corruption probe into former EIB senior executives Werner Hoyer and Henry von Blumenthal. The two stand accused of "corruption, abuse of influence, as well as the misappropriation of EU funds."

=== Climate change ===
A 2011 report by the CEE Bankwatch Network accused the EIB of a lending policy that failed its responsibility to further the EU goal of cutting carbon emissions.

In 2019 the bank announced it would cease funding most fossil fuel projects by the end of 2021, a decision approved by members representing 90% of its capital. It will only fund energy projects capable of producing one kilowatt hour of energy for less than 250 grams of carbon dioxide. EIB energy loans were €21.3 billion in 2023, up from €11.6 billion in 2020, supporting energy efficiency, renewable energy, innovation, storage, and new energy network infrastructure.

The 2019 agreement received criticism for its limitations for continuing to fund carbon-intensive activities including high carbon agriculture, airport expansions and new conventional energy intensive plants including gas. In November 2020 the EIB announced the "Climate Bank Roadmap 2021–2025" which will include stopping funding high carbon projects, including a just transition mechanism, increasing accountability and accelerating their timetable for green funding to make more than 50% of annual financing dedicated to green investment by 2025.

=== Tax ===
In 2014, eleven NGOs demanded the release of an EIB report into allegations of tax fraud by the Swiss commodity trader Glencore in Zambia related to the Mopani Copper Mines. Following a recommendation of the European Ombudsman the EIB released a summary which stated their investigation had been "non-conclusive". The Ombudsman subsequently called this summary inadequate and accused the EIB of failing to meet its own transparency policy. In response, EIB stopped lending to Glencore in 2011 due to concerns about its corporate governance.

The EIB reviewed its transparency standards applying to control functions by including a new provision of the EIB Group's Transparency Policy of 2015 allowing the bank to disclose a summary after an investigation has been closed.

Reports in 2010 and 2015, from a coalition of NGOs, implicated the EIB in tax avoidance by lending to businesses that use tax havens. The EIB has been constantly improving its procedures and standards including on governance and tax matters. This includes the EIB's Environmental and Social Standards, the Anti-fraud Policy, and the EIB Group Policy towards weakly regulated, non-transparent and non-cooperative jurisdictions and tax good governance.

=== Harassment ===
In 2021 EIB has been criticised related to its treatment of staff, following several cases of harassment, bullying and suicide in its premises. The European Parliament, in its annual report on the EIB in July 2021, referred to its "serious concerns about allegations regarding harassment and the working environment" at the EIB. In July 2022, the European Parliament again expressed "serious concerns about the lack of social dialogue at the EIB, in particular to address concerns about harassment allegations and the working environment".

== EIB structure ==
The EIB's departments prepare and implement the decisions of management bodies. The departments carry out evaluation, appraisal and then finance projects; assess and manage risks, run economic or financial background studies and raise financial resources on the capital markets. Article 308 et seq. of the Treaty on the Functioning of the European Union (TFEU) establishes the EIB, and the Protocol (No 5) on the Statute of the European Investment Bank is annexed to the TFEU.

=== Governance ===
The European Investment Bank has three decision-making bodies: the Board of Governors, the board of directors and the Management Committee. The board of governors, who are the finance ministers of the European Union member states, sets the direction of the European Investment Bank. The board of directors oversees strategic direction. The Management Committee supervises daily operations.

The European Investment Bank's president chairs the meetings of the management committee. The members of the management committee are responsible solely to the bank; they are appointed by the board of governors, on a proposal from the board of directors, for a renewable period of six years. The president is also chair of the board of directors.

Internal and independent controls aim to guarantee the integrity and soundness of European Investment Bank's operations. These include Investigations, Audit Committee, Compliance, Credit Risk, Financial Control, Internal Control, Internal Audit, External Auditors, and Operations Evaluation. The bank also cooperates with independent control bodies: European Court of Auditors, the European Anti-Fraud Office (OLAF) and the European Ombudsman.

In 2018, seven EU governments demanded improvements in the governance and structure of the institution as well as stricter cost controls. There were concerns that EIB had been slow to implement recommendations raised by its own audit committee, which aimed at improving the risk management and project selection.

=== Accountability ===
==== Internal control bodies ====
The EIB has four statutory bodies; the audit committee, the board of governors, the board of directors and the management committee.

The audit committee functions as an independent control body and verifies the bank's operations and the validity of its accounts. Its six independent members are appointed for a non-renewable term of office of six consecutive financial years by the board of governors. It issues a report on the bank's financial statements at the time of approval of the financial statements by the board of directors. The audit committee directly reports to the board of governors.

The audit committee appoints the external auditors of the EIB and evaluates their independence and investigates potential conflicts of interest. In recent years, KPMG has functioned as the EIB's external auditor.

Other internal organisational provisions such as Financial Control or Internal Audit make recommendations regarding the effectiveness of the bank's governance, risk management or internal control and express their opinion on certain aspects of the EIB's financial policies and their implementation.

The EIB Compliance Function is responsible for ensuring that all of the bank's activities are in line with its standards of integrity. Its tasks include combating money laundering and the financing of terrorism, and supporting a corporate culture that is based on ethical values and professional conduct.

==== External control bodies ====
The EIB also cooperates with independent control bodies: the European Court of Auditors, the European Anti-Fraud Office (OLAF) and the European Ombudsman. According to Article 287(3) of the Treaty on the Functioning of the EU (TFEU), the European Court of Auditors has access to information required for the audit of the European Union's expenditure and revenue managed by the EIB. This means that the Court of Auditors is authorised to audit loan operations that are under the mandate conferred by the EU or that are guaranteed by the general EU budget and administered by the EIB. The bank further collaborates with the European Anti-Fraud Office (OLAF) to combat fraud and corruption within European Institutions. Based on a memorandum of understanding between the European Investment Bank and the European Ombudsman, EU citizens can escalate their concerns regarding an EIB project, policy or activity to the European Ombudsman if the outcome of the EIB's Complaints Mechanism is not satisfactory.

==== Transparency ====
Complaints can range from environmental degradation or threats to community health and safety to involuntary resettlement. The Complaints Mechanism team examines whether the EIB Group has failed to comply with internal policies, standards or procedures or with applicable legislation and offers mediation to solve conflicts between the complainant and an EIB project or activity. It monitors closed complaints to ensure that agreed measures are implemented. Improvements to the EIB policy framework that are identified during complaints processes are given to the senior management.

The EIB's Project Procurements Complaints Committee (PCC) deals with projects procurement complaints, e.g. objections arising from tendering of EIB-financed contracts for goods, works and consultant services. The Fraud Investigations Division investigates allegations, verifies the existence of a robust anti-fraud policy framework, proactively identifies actual or potential vulnerabilities and trains staff on fraud awareness.

The bank publishes documents related to its role, governance, accountability, policies and operations. Project-related information usually include a summary of the investment project, the loans obtained through financial intermediaries, environmental and social information, and project briefs. Key figures and information on the EIB's lending activities are published in the EIB Activity Reports (yearly figures) and the Statistical Reports (summary tables). As part of the bank's Transparency policy the EIB does not publish information that may harm legitimate interests of clients and project partners. It refuses to disclose, for example, personal data, commercial interests such as patents, and information related to on-going investigations. In 2014, the EIB set up a public register to increase transparency and to allow citizens to browse the bank's publications or to request documents.

==== Communication and outreach ====
The EIB Complaints Mechanism organises events to inform the general public and members of Civil Society Organisations (CSOs) of the mandate of the mechanism, the admissibility criteria and the methodological approach. In addition, the European Investment Bank holds formal public consultations to demonstrate transparency and accountability and to benefit from the participants' expertise.

=== Offices ===
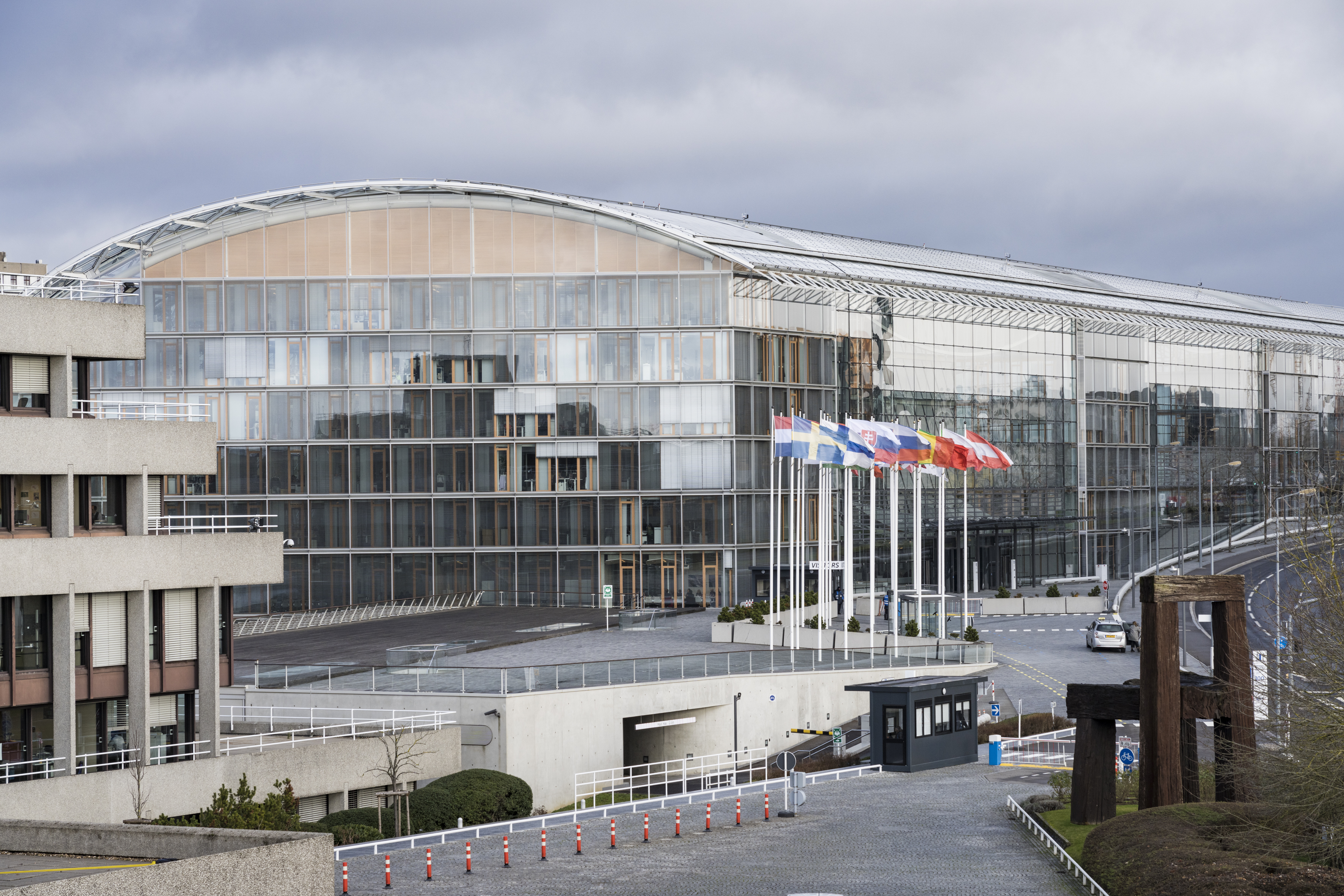
EIB headquarter building in Luxembourg

The bank is active in 140 countries throughout the world in the following geographical areas: Enlargement countries, European Free Trade Association (EFTA), EU Southern Neighbourhood, EU Eastern Neighbourhood, Sub-Saharan Africa, Caribbean and Pacific, Asia and Latin America, Central Asia and the United Kingdom.

European Union
Country	City
Austria	Vienna
Belgium	Brussels
Bulgaria	Sofia
Croatia	Zagreb
Czech Republic	Prague
Denmark	Copenhagen
Finland	Helsinki
France	Paris
Germany	Berlin
Greece	Athens
Hungary	Budapest
Ireland	Dublin
Italy	Rome
Lithuania	Vilnius
Luxembourg	Luxembourg
Netherlands	Amsterdam
Poland	Warsaw
Portugal	Lisbon
Romania	Bucharest
Slovakia	Bratislava
Slovenia	Ljubljana
Spain	Madrid
Sweden	Stockholm

Non European Union
Country	City
Albania	Tirana
Australia	Sydney
Barbados	Bridgetown
Bosnia and Herzegovina	Sarajevo
Cameroon	Yaoundé
China	Beijing
Colombia	Bogota
Côte d'Ivoire	Abidjan
Dominican Republic	Santo Domingo
Egypt	Cairo
Ethiopia	Addis Ababa
Georgia	Tbilisi
India	New Delhi
Jordan	Amman
Kenya	Nairobi
Lebanon	Beirut
Moldova	Chișinău
Morocco	Rabat
New Zealand	Auckland
Russia	Moscow
Senegal	Dakar
Serbia	Beograd
South Africa	Pretoria
Tunisia	Tunis
Turkey	Ankara
Turkey	Istanbul
Ukraine	Kyiv
United Kingdom	London
United States	Washington, D.C.

== Leadership ==
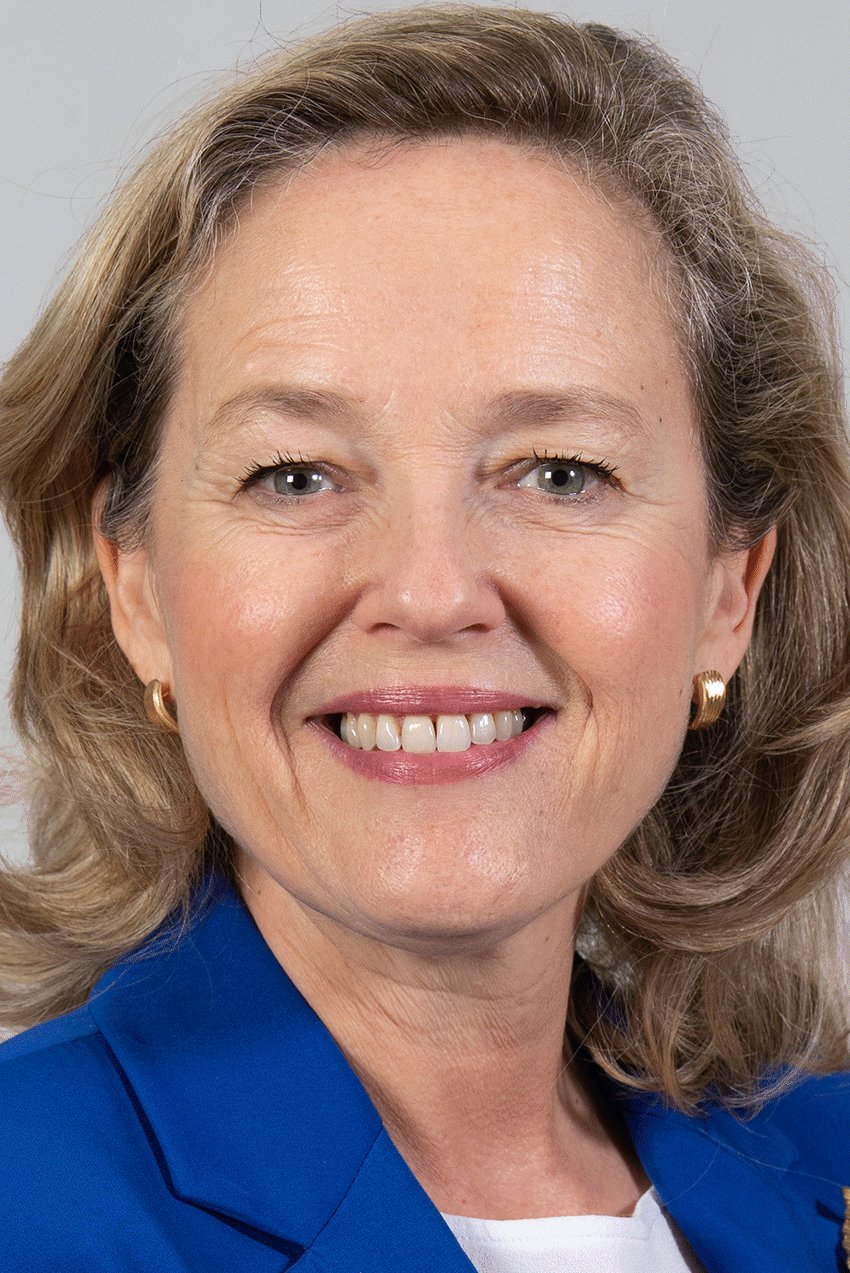
Nadia Calviño, president of the European Investment Bank as of 2024

Presidents of the EIB:

- Pietro Campilli (Italy): February 1958 – May 1959
- Paride Formentini (Italy): June 1959 – September 1970
- Yves Le Portz (France): September 1970 – July 1984
- Ernst-Günther Bröder (Germany): August 1984 – March 1993
- Sir Brian Unwin (UK): April 1993 – December 1999
- Philippe Maystadt (Belgium): March 2000 – December 2011
- Werner Hoyer (Germany): January 2012 – January 2024
- Nadia Calviño (Spain): January 2024 – present

Dr. Werner Hoyer was the president of the European Investment Bank from 2012 to 2024. He was named European Banker of the Year in 2019 for his contribution to economic stability and development in Europe. Under Hoyer the European Investment Bank has funded EUR 150 billion in projects that contribute to reducing greenhouse gas emissions.

Nadia Calviño has been appointed as the president of the European Investment Bank in 2024. This appointment follows her nomination by the Spanish government in August 2023 and the endorsement of the German and Belgian governments. The Economic and Financial Affairs Council granted approval to her candidacy in early December 2023. Calviño had previously held the position of First Deputy Prime Minister of Spain from July 2021 and served as Minister of Economy from 2018 until December 2023.

== Publications and multimedia ==
The European Investment Bank publishes a wide range of reports, studies, essays, surveys and working papers aimed at professionals and the general public. All publications are available free of charge on the Publications page of the EIB website, in their digital formats: PDF, e-book or online with a limited number of print publications available free of charge.

=== Annual reports ===
The EIB publishes annual reports including the Activity Report, the Financial report, the Statistical Report, the Investment Report and the Sustainability Report which cover the main activities of the bank.

=== Surveys ===
European Investment Bank does research in several areas.

=== Blog ===
The site of the bank also hosts blog articles, expert essays, press releases and podcasts. In 2019 the podcast series A Dictionary of finance won The Digital Communication Awards prize for Best Channel. In 2020 the podcast series, Monster under the Bed, received the SABRE Award in the category Best in Audio. The bank's Climate Solutions content series (expert blog posts, podcast series and e-book) won the European Excellence Award 2020 in the Sustainability and Environment category.

== See also ==
- Climate action
- Green New Deal
- Sustainable Development Goals
- Treaty on the Functioning of the European Union
- Development finance institution
- Investment banking
- Multilateral development bank
- European Long Term Investors
- European Banking union
