= Stanari Thermal Power Plant =

Coal-fired power plant in Bosnia and Herzegovina

- Official name: Термоелектрана "Станари"
- Country: Bosnia and Herzegovina
- Location: Stanari
- Coordinates: 44°45′14″N 17°47′36″E
- Status: Operational
- Commission date: September 2016; 10 years ago
- Owner: Elektrane Stanari d.o.o.
- Operator: Elektrane Stanari d.o.o.

Thermal power station
- Primary fuel: Coal

Power generation
- Units operational: 1
- Nameplate capacity: 300 MW
- Annual net output: 1,926 GWh (2025)

Stanari Thermal Power Plant, hereinafter referred to as Stanari TPP, is a thermal power plant located 70 kilometers east of Banja Luka, Republika Srpska, Bosnia and Herzegovina. It is owned and operated by Elektrane Stanari.

The power plant uses coal from the Stanari coal mine as fuel. The power plant uses a dry cooling system (air-cooled condenser) for steam-cycle cooling, rather than river- or lake-water-based cooling.

== History ==
The power plant entered final testing in early 2016 and achieved commercial operation in September 2016. It has since operated synchronously with the electricity grid of Bosnia and Herzegovina.

== General information ==
The 300 MW thermal power plant produces 2 million MWh of energy per year. Coal is supplied from the adjacent Stanari coal mine which underwent refurbishment in 2006 in order to provide a stable fuel supply to the power station. According to EFT, the construction of the power plant created 1,200 new jobs during the construction phase and around 800 permanent jobs after completion. Beneficiaries have included and continue to include the construction industry, various suppliers, logistics and other service providers in Bosnia and Herzegovina. The total cost of the Stanari project was approximately EUR 500 million. China Development Bank provided a 350 million euro loan to construct the facility and China's Dongfang Electric Corporation was engaged by the owner, EFT, to build it. This is the largest credit facility agreed for a private enterprise concern in Bosnia and Herzegovina to date. The EFT financed the balance of the construction costs from its own equity.

== Environmental impact ==
According to statements issued by various regional NGOs in 2013, an alleged lack of an appropriate environmental assessment suggested the plant would fail to abide by EU directives and minimize harmful impacts on the environment. This resulted in a complaint to the EU's Energy Community Secretariat, which however rejected the complaint, finding that, by contrast, ‘the authorities of Republika Srpska conducted a proper environmental impact assessment procedure’.

== Ownership ==
The power plant is owned and operated by "Elektrane Stanari d.o.o.", which is majority owned by Stanari Investments Limited (a company of Vuk Hamović and Zoran Ivković).

== See also ==
- List of power stations in Bosnia and Herzegovina
