= Nenskra Hydropower Plant Project =

- Location within Samegrelo-Zemo Svaneti Location within Georgia
- Country: Georgia
- Location: Zhoneti, Georgia
- Coordinates: 43°02′50″N 42°22′50″E

Reservoir
- Creates: Zhoneti

Nenskra Hydropower Plant
- Website nenskra.ge/en/

Nenskra Hydro Power Plant (also known as Nenskra HPP) is a proposed hydroelectric power station to be located on the southern slopes of the Central Caucasus mountains in Svaneti, Georgia.

The plant has a projected capacity of 280 MW, and a projected average annual energy production of 1.2 TWh. It is being developed by JSC Nenskra Hydro, founded in 2015 as a joint venture between Korea Water Resource Corporation and JSC Partnership Fund.

The project has faced significant opposition from representatives of all communities in Upper Svaneti.

== General Background ==
The Nenskra river joins the river Enguri from the right side. It is 42 km long with the watershed area of 623 km^{2}. The river originates on elevation of 2915 m above the sea level and is nourished by glaciers, snow, rain, and ground waters. Its water regime is characterized with flood in spring and summer and shallowness in winter. Flood rate is the highest in autumn. In winter the river experiences flood icing, anchor ice, ice apron. Average annual discharge of the Nenskra river is 40.1 m^{3}/s.

In winter, when less water is available from rivers and domestic energy consumption rises, Georgia experiences a deficit in electricity supplies, and imports energy from neighbouring countries. Nenskra HPP is one of the four proposed power schemes with a large regulation capacity, intended to meet the government's strategy to reduce dependency on imported power during the winter.

== Description ==
Nenskra HPP will be constructed in the Nenskra and Nakra valleys on the southern slopes of the Central Caucasus mountains in Mestia Municipality, Svaneti. Construction is scheduled to start in 2020.

Nenskra HPP is being implemented based on BOT (Build-operate-transfer) model that stipulates transfer of the ownership to Georgia 36 years after the HPP is commissioned.

=== Nenskra Powerhouse ===
The Nenskra HPP powerhouse will house three vertical Pelton turbines of 93 MW capacity each and with 280 MW total installed capacity. Generated power will be transmitted to a Gas Insulated Substation (GIS Substation) and through the transmission line will be connected to the country's power grid.

Water flow of 47.0 m/s will be transferred through a 15.1 km long and 4.5 m wide headrace tunnel to the turbines. In the close proximity with the HPP powerhouse, the headrace tunnel will branch into three separate penstocks to connect to the turbines. Water is transferred to a tunnel through a water intake located on the left bank of the reservoir creating a 130 m high asphalt faced-rockfill dam. The dam will be raised about 5 km off the village of Tita up the narrow gorge of the Nenskra river creating a live storage of 3,176 million m^{3}. From the reservoir, water is to be supplied into the headrace tunnel. To improve the energy scheme, three low-pressure dams will be constructed in the Nakra river valley. Out of the created reservoir, 45.5 m/s additional water is to be discharged into the Nenskra reservoir through a transfer tunnel allowing the Nenskra HPP to produce 1,219 GWh yearly.

The powerhouse of Nenskra HPP is planned on the left bank of the Nenskra river on the edge of village Chuberi. The power unit will consist of the HPP powerhouse and near-located GIS substation.

=== Nenskra Dam & Nakra Weir ===
The main structures of the Nenskra dam are to be a 125–130 high and 870 long dam on the upper Nenskra river to create a live storage of 176 million m^{3} and a reservoir area at supply level of 2.7 km^{2}. The dam will capture the flows of the Nenskra river and the adjacent Nakra river upstream of the existing Khudoni HPP reservoir, exploiting the available head of 725 m.

The Nakra Weir is 8.7 m high and 44 m long located on the Nakra river and is built for impoundment and diversion.

=== Tunnels ===
The Nakra transfer tunnel connects the Nakra valley with the Nenskra valley and is approximately 12.5 km long by 3.5 m in diameter and will divert water from behind the Nakra weir and into the Nenskra reservoir.

The Nenskra headrace tunnel follows the left bank of the Nenskra valley and is about 15.1 km long by 4.5 m wide. The tunnel connects to the surface penstock upstream of the Powerhouse at a level around 600 m above valley floor level.

The power unit will include the HPP powerhouse, tailrace for discharged water and GIS substation.

Water will be supplied from the intake of the headrace tunnel to the end of the penstock. The penstock starts from the surge, which then transfers into the turbine tunnels. Waste water will be discharged into the Nenskra river by tailrace.

During the operation, 3 units of Pelton turbine type electromechanical plants, each with installed capacity of 93MW will be installed.

To defend from the probable maximum flood, the diversion tunnel dimensions are designed to deal with probable maximum discharge of 1 101 m/s that is 3.67 times as much as expected discharge of 300 m/s with the rate of once in 10000 years.

=== Reservoir ===
According to the previously drawn up plan the reservoir will capture the flow slowly and gradually (layer by layer). The dam will operate in the natural regime of the river through a bottom outlet to keep the water at the level of 1 370 m.

== Impacts ==
=== Environmental and Social Impact Assessment Reports (ESIA) ===
In 2015, the Nenskra Hydropower Project submitted the final Environmental & Social Impact Assessment Report (ESIA) to the Government of Georgia (GoG) as part of the national environmental permitting process.

The 2015 ESIA report has been prepared by Gamma Consulting Limited, a Georgian consultant, based on field investigations undertaken in 2011 and 2014 and following the public consultations held in May 2015. The Environmental Permit was issued by the Environmental Authorities in October 2015.

Several International Financial Institutions (the Lenders) have been approached to finance the Project. To ensure compliance with their Environmental and Social (E&S) policies, the Lenders recommended that a number of Supplementary E&S Studies be undertaken.

In 2017 the supplementary studies-based report consisting of ten volumes was disclosed to the general public. The report is available at JSC Nenskra Hydro web-site.

Based on the research made JSC Nenskra Hydro has prepared The Environmental and Social Impact management Plan. The plan aims at implementing mitigation measures during the construction and operation in compliance with Georgian legislative requirements and international standards.

Disclosure of the report has started in March 2017. During the disclosure period JSC Nenskra Hydro should introduce the relevant report data to the general public of Georgia, Nenskra and Nakra valleys communities, NGOs, Government of Georgia and other stakeholders.

=== Economical impact of the project ===
According to the National Statistics Office of Georgia, JSC Nenskra investment was among the 2015 direct investments Top 10.

The Nenskra HPP Project will create jobs for the local population both during the construction and operation. 100% of unskilled labor will be represented by residents of the Nenskra and Nakra valleys. 75% of partly unskilled labor will be provided by Georgians, out of whom 50% will be residents of Mestia.

In 2016, the project company conducted a study to identify the needs of the local residents. With the study findings and needs of the population in view, the project company launched a community investment program with the following goals:

- create jobs for the local population through support and strengthening of local business
- develop and reinforce the village areas through encouraging of agricultural business and collective farms
- increase involvement of the population into economic and social activities
- contribute to market and touristic business in the Nenskra and Nakra valleys

=== Social Impacts ===
Some 400 families live in close by villages (Chuberi and Nakra). The majority are Svans, an ethnic subgroup of Georgia's Caucasus mountains with their own language, laws and traditions. The traditions, culture, and identity of the Svans' is rooted in their mountain location. For generations, they have lived in isolation and self-dependence and their livelihoods depend on forestry, grazing and subsistence agriculture. Approximately 28 households will be affected by the project's land acquisition phase, either through permanent loss of land or temporary loss of access to pastures near the dam and reservoir sites.

=== Geological & Environmental Impacts ===
"[From a] nature preservation point of view, not all of these larger [rivers] like Enguri and smaller rivers like Nenskra and Nakra should be used for hydropower generation." Prof. Dr. Frank Schrader, International Consultant on Hydropower, in his review of the Nenskra ESIA.

The project site was originally proposed to be included within the European system of protected areas as the ‘Svaneti 1’ Emerald site. In January 2016 the Georgian government attempted to exclude all territories to form part of the planned Nenskra project, without providing any evidence that the Nenskra and Nakra valleys are less important in terms of biodiversity than the rest of the Svaneti region. This resulted in a complaint to the Berne Convention on the Conservation of European Wildlife and Natural Habitats for a violation of a number of articles of the convention.

The dam construction will also include constructions of bypass and access roads, high voltage transmission lines and substations. These construction may increase landslides. An indirect result of this project is also the increased chance of flooding because of the mudflows. These mudflows have the potential of blocking the Nakra river, creating flooding upstream. Svaneti is a landslides and mud-flows sensitive area. The local cemetery and agricultural fields of the village of Nakra are regularly flooded by mud-flows. These mudflows have the potential of blocking the Nakra river, creating flooding upstream. Yet according to a review of the Nenskra Environmental and Social Impact Assessment (ESIA), the geologic hazards and potential adverse impacts on locals have not been properly evaluated.

== Involvement of International Financial Institutions ==
The project involves the following international financial institutions: European Bank for Reconstruction and Development (EBRD), Asian Development Bank (ADB), European Investment Bank (EIB), Korean Development Bank (KDB), Italian Export Credit Agency (SACE) and Asian Infrastructure Investment Bank (AIIB).

== Project implementation ==
The Project is being implemented by K-water, a sole multi-purpose dam management company in Korea and international engineering companies, such as Stucky, Mott MacDonald and Lombardi.

The company has announced "international tender" to select Engineering, Procurement and Construction (EPC) Contractor.

Independent International Panel of Experts (IPOE) is monitoring all designs and activities, to ensure dam safety and its compliance with the environmental and social standards.

== See also ==
- List of power stations in Georgia (country)
