= Stanari coal mine =

Open-pit coal mine in Bosnia and Herzegovina

Stanari Coal Mine
- Location within Republika Srpska Location within Bosnia and Herzegovina
- Location: Doboj, Republika Srpska, Bosnia and Herzegovina; 44°45′55″N 17°49′29″E
- Products: Lignite
- Production: 3.1 million tonnes of coal (2023)
- Company: Elektrane Stanari d.o.o.

The Stanari Coal Mine is an open-pit coal mine located in the municipality Doboj, Republika Srpska, Bosnia and Herzegovina. It is owned and operated by Elektrane Stanari.

The mine has coal reserves amounting to 148.8 million tonnes of lignite, one of the largest coal reserves in Europe and the world. The mine has an annual production generation of 3.1 million tonnes of coal (as of 2023).

The most of its coal is used for the electricity generation at Stanari Thermal Power Plant.

== Ownership ==
The mine is owned and operated by "Elektrane Stanari d.o.o.", which is majority owned by Stanari Investments Limited (a company of Vuk Hamović and Zoran Ivković).
