= Shuakhevi Hydro Power Plant =

Coordinates: 41.6576°N 42.3497°E

The Shuakhevi Hydro Power Plant (Skuakhevi HPP) is a run-of-the-river plant in Adjara, Georgia. Construction on the project began in 2013 and was completed in April 2021. It has an installed capacity of 185 megawatts (248,000 hp) with expected electricity output of 452 gigawatt-hours (1,630 TJ). The plant has the capacity for diurnal storage in two reservoirs (22-metre (72 ft) Skhalta dam with a 19.4-hectare (48-acre) reservoir and 39-metre (128 ft) Didachara dam with a 16.9-hectare (42-acre) reservoir), allowing Shuakhevi HPP to store water for up to 12 hours and sell electricity at peak demand times. Three main tunnels were constructed on the Shuakhevi project; the 5.8 km Chirukhistsqali to Skhalta transfer tunnel, the 9.1 kilometres (5.7 mi) Skhalta to Didachara transfer tunnel and the 17.8 km Shuakhevi headrace and pressure tunnel. It is estimated that the project will cost US$417 million. For the purposes of developing, constructing and operating the Shuakhevi HPP, ADB and EBRD extended a loan to Adjaristsqali Georgia LLC of up to $86.5 million and IFC a loan of 80m USD. Adjaristsqali Georgia LLC is owned by the Norwegian Clean Energy Invest AS (40%), India's Tata Power (40%) and IFC Infraventures (20%), an investment fund created by the International Finance Corporation. Alstom was chosen to supply the electromechanical equipment for the project.

== The importance of Shuakhevi HPP for Georgia ==
Electricity demand in Georgia has been on the rise since 2009 and investment in new generation capacity is lagging behind. Georgia has about 40 billion kwt/h of potential electricity and only 18-20% is utilized today. The Shuakhevi HPP is a part of a large Georgian strategy to develop its hydropower potential. It will enable Georgia to use more of its energy resources to meet electricity demand during the winter months of December, January and February. Most of the energy will be exported to Turkey. The positive aspects of the investment according to EBRD include strengthening Georgia’s private energy sector, demonstrating new financing methods (the project will be the first power project in Georgia to rely on limited recourse financing) and setting standards for corporate governance and business conduct. It will also generate employment opportunities for local population. More than 700 Georgians were working in the project in 2016, most of them from the local communities. Almost 500 locals were trained in a school especially designed to build required technical skills. The project company has also funded an extensive CSR program in the valley with significant infrastructure upgrades for the local communities, support for local businesses etc. The project has also enabled the construction of a new 220 kV transmission line from Akhalsikhe to Batumi, significantly strengthening the grid connection in the whole of South Western Georgia.

== Controversial issues ==
=== Project justification ===
The contract for the Shuakhevi HPP project is the only contract for a hydropower project in Georgia where articles related to obligations of the state and the company on electricity tariffs and economic profitability are kept confidential. It is hard to say how the project will benefit Georgia, since it is not clear how the money will end up in the state budget.

The project has responsibility to deliver electricity for three winter months in Georgia for a fixed tariff, contributing to reducing the need to import electricity and reducing the carbon emissions from electricity production in Georgia.

The project will pay 1% of invested amount in property taxes to the local municipality where the infrastructure is located, which is estimated to significantly increase the budgets in the municipalities hosting the infrastructure.

=== Environmental impact ===
The project is designed to divert water flows from the upper parts of the Adjaristskali, Skhalta and Chirukhistskali rivers towards the reservoirs and then the powerhouse and leave only 10 percent of the average annual flow of the rivers. That will have a negative impact on the river ecosystem, including red-listed species like trout.

=== Social impact ===
Since there are no villages within the project site, the project did not envisage resettlement of local population. However, the project site is characterised by landslides. The tunnel drilled under the village Ghurta, which is one of three diversion tunnels part of the project, did not trigger any landslide as feared by the local population. Detailed geological investigations were undertaken by Mott MacDonald, one of the leading underground geological engineers in the world before the construction started to ensure that it was safe to construct a dam in the Didachara area. The memory of the 1971 landslide which cost 22 people’s lives is still very much alive among local population. Adjaristsqali Georgia LLC is denying the risks, however they are reluctant to sign warranty contracts to offer compensation in case the constructions cause damages.

== Events ==
=== Protest on 8 March 2014 ===
On 8 March there was a protest against the Shuakhevi HPP. About 500 villagers blocked the road to prevent the construction of a tunnel for the 187 MW Shuakhevi HPP in Didachara were dispersed by policemen and special forces. The main concern of the people is that the construction would trigger landslides.

== See also ==
- List of power stations in Georgia (country)
- Energy in Georgia (country)
