= Stanari =

Village and municipality in Bosnia and Herzegovina

Stanari Станари
- Municipality
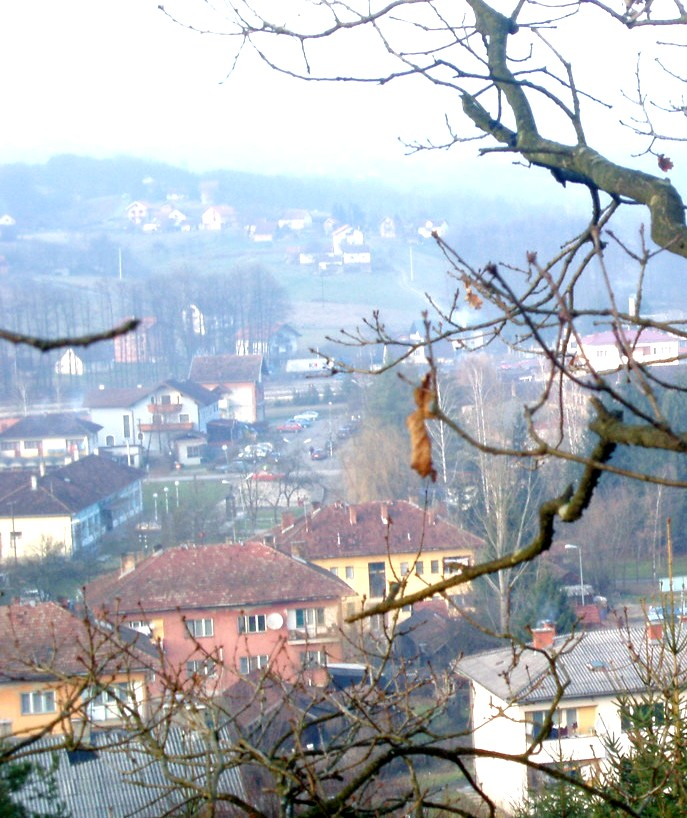
- Panorama of the town Stanari

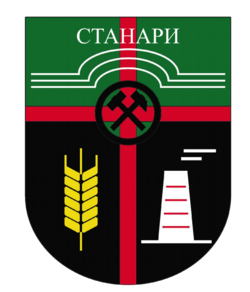
- Seal

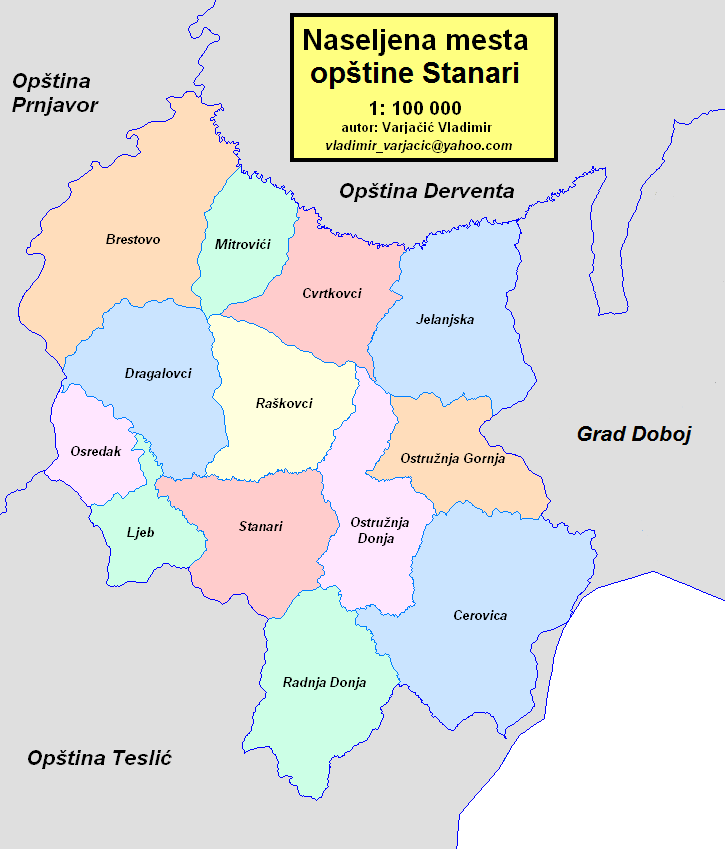
- Municipality map
- Coordinates: 44°44′50″N 17°49′46″E
- Country: Bosnia and Herzegovina
- Entity: Republika Srpska
- Re-established: 2014

Government
  - Municipal mayor: Aleksandar Ristić (US)

Area
  - Total: 161 km^{2} (62 sq mi)

Population (2013)
  - Municipality: 6,958
  - Settlement: 1,015
- Time zone: UTC+1 (CET)
  - Summer (DST): UTC+2 (CEST)
- Website: www.opstinastanari.com

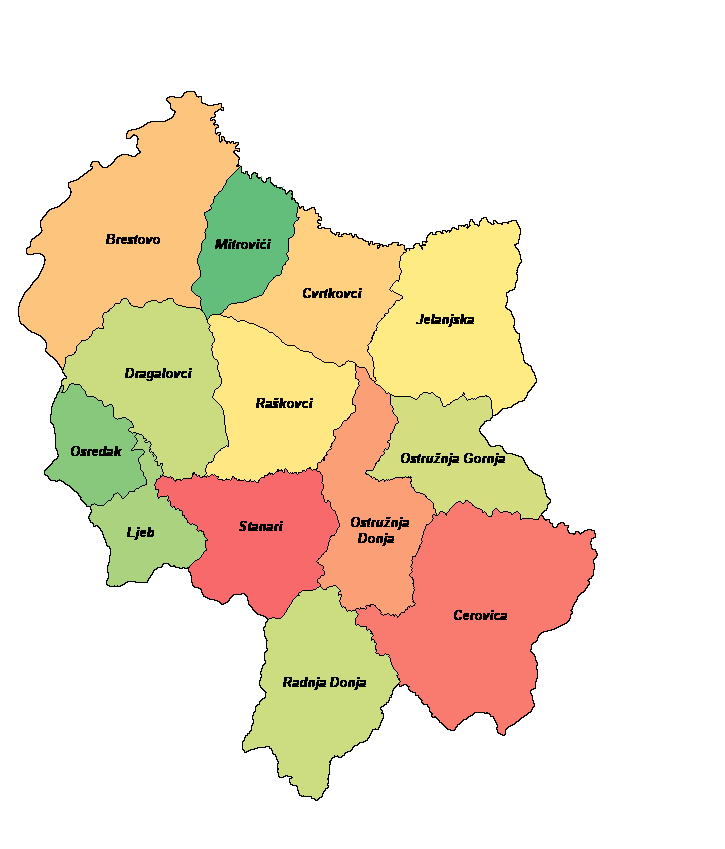
Stanari municipality by population proportional to the settlement with the highest and lowest population

Stanari (Serbian Cyrillic: Станари) is a village and municipality in Republika Srpska, Bosnia and Herzegovina. It was established in 2014, after it split from Doboj municipality. As of 2013, it has a population of 6,958 inhabitants, while Stanari itself has a population of 1,015 inhabitants.

== Geography ==
=== Physical geography ===
The municipality is located in the basin of the Ukrina river in the area of Krnjin and is characterized by a mostly lowland hilly terrain configuration with a minimum altitude of 138 m (Brestovo) and a maximum altitude of 343 m (Radnja Donja). The municipality of Stanari has three hilly peaks with an altitude of more than 300 m, located on three different sides of the territorial unit of the municipality of Stanari.

=== Political geography ===
The municipality is located in the northern part of Republika Srpska on coordinates of eastern longitude 17°49′46″ and 44°44′50″ north latitude and borders the city of Doboj, and the municipalities of Derventa, Prnjavor, Teslić and Tešanj. It is one of the smaller municipalities of Republika Srpska, with an area of 160.96 km2. The area of the territory of the makes 0,643% of the total territory of the Republika Srpska.

=== Climate ===
The area of the municipality belongs to the zone of temperate continental climate with moderately cold winters (average temperature in January –0.7 °C) and moderately warm summers (average temperature in July 30.9 °C). The average number of total hours of sunshine is 1,570 hours. The average annual rainfall is about 950 mm, and is evenly distributed throughout the year.

== History ==
=== The formation of the Stanari Municipality ===
The municipality of Stanari existed and functioned until 1959, when in one of the numerous reorganizations it was abolished and annexed to the municipality of Doboj. The population of this area quickly realized the wrongdoing, because already in 1965 the municipality, becoming a unit of measure in the planning documents, resolved vital life problems much faster (for example, in 1965 the People's Loan solved the paving of roads at the headquarters of each municipality), and even then launched an activity to rebuild Stanari Municipality.

Due to a lack of understanding, on the one hand, and political obstruction, the initiative for the renewal of the Stanari municipality was not implemented in a few subsequent attempts (1969, 1976 and 1984), and the Initiative Committee for the Restoration of the Municipality of Stanari in 1991 froze the initiative itself, not wanting to question the broader national interests. In 1996, the issue of redevelopment of Stanari Municipality was raised again. At a session held in late December, the will of the residents to become a municipal center was once again confirmed.

According to 1996 data, the municipality of Stanari comprised 17 settlements, covering an area of about 213 square kilometers, and according to the census, about 15,000 inhabitants lived in the area. Representatives wishing to break away from Doboj municipality said in the debate that they support the idea of safeguarding the general interest of Serbs in the Doboj area and that they are ready to wait for the right time to establish the municipality, and they also believe that this job is most suitable after the upcoming elections. The members of the Main Board unanimously approved the content of the Request sent to the National Assembly of Republika Srpska, which is to be passed by the Law on the Establishment of the Municipality of Stanari.

Residents got the status of the municipality again in 2014, when the Law on Formation of the Municipality of Stanari was adopted, much to the delight of the residents of this area. The first mayor of the newly formed municipality, elected in February 2015, was Dušan Panić, of the Alliance of Independent Social Democrats.

== Demographics ==
=== Population ===
According to the 1991 census, all 13 settlements that today make up the municipality of Stanari belonged to Doboj municipality, with 11,238 residents.

In the 2013 census in Bosnia and Herzegovina, all 13 settlements, of which the municipality of Stanari was formed a year later, were within the City of Doboj, and according to the final data for the Republika Srpska issued by the Statistical Office of the Republic of Srpska, had a population 6,958 inhabitants.

Population of settlements – Stanari municipality
	Settlement	1948.	1953.	1961.	1971.	1981.	1991.	2013.
	Total	8,494	9,682	11,148	11,898	12,457	11,238	6,958
1	Brestovo	1,271	1,384	1,426	1,513	1,417	1,254	644
2	Dragalovci	896	996	1,110	1,204	1,312	1,031	367
3	Jelanjska	656	749	874	827	843	701	435
4	Ljeb	338	394	442	442	506	446	325
5	Mitrovići	427	476	506	511	491	441	233
6	Osredak	481	555	603	707	730	605	282
7	Ostružnja Gornja	153	377	453	509	510	495	380
8	Ostružnja Donja	835	763	924	1,024	1,120	1,130	838
9	Radnja Donja	441	498	578	673	710	572	368
10	Raškovci	572	592	700	694	714	666	460
11	Stanari	641	777	1,141	1,224	1,301	1,299	1,123
12	Cvrtkovci	622	769	915	998	945	897	581
13	Cerovica	1,161	1,352	1,476	1,572	1,858	1,701	1,030

=== Ethnic composition ===
Ethnic composition – Stanari
	2013.	1991.	1981.	1971.
Total	1,123 (100,0%)	1,299 (100,0%)	1,301 (100,0%)	1,224 (100,0%)
Serbs		1,204 (92,69%)	1,143 (87,86%)	1,176 (96,08%)
Yugoslavs		45 (3,464%)	89 (6,841%)	7 (0,572%)
Others		29 (2,232%)	39 (2,998%)	15 (1,225%)
Croats		20 (1,540%)	13 (0,999%)	17 (1,389%)
Bosniaks		1 (0,077%)	2 (0,154%)	3 (0,245%)
Montenegrins			13 (0,999%)	6 (0,490%)
Macedonians			2 (0,154%)	

Ethnic composition – Stanari municipality
	2013.	1991.
Total	6,958 (100,0%)	11,238 (100,0%)
Serbs		9,606 (85,48%)
Croats		1,162 (10,34%)
Yugoslavs		250 (2,225%)
Others		212 (1,886%)
Bosniaks		8 (0,071%)

Ethnic composition (1991.) – Stanari municipality by settlements
	Settlement	Serbs	Croats	Bosniaks	Yugoslavs	Others
	Total	9,606 (85.48%)	1,162 (10.34%)	8 (0.07%)	250 (2.22%)	212 (1.89%)
1	Brestovo	1,192	2	0	13	47
2	Dragalovci	32	858	3	86	52
3	Jelanjska	682	0	0	3	16
4	Ljeb	426	0	0	9	11
5	Mitrovići	424	1	0	6	10
6	Osredak	408	152	0	42	3
7	Ostružnja Gornja	491	1	0	2	11
8	Ostružnja Donja	1,090	3	2	17	18
9	Radnja Donja	557	0	0	11	4
10	Raškovci	530	117	1	10	8
11	Stanari	1,204	20	1	45	29
12	Cvrtkovci	888	2	0	0	7
13	Cerovica	1,682	6	1	6	6

== Tourism ==
=== Nature ===
Cerovička Cave, also called the Vuković cave among the locals, is a cave located on one of the long hill lines that follows the terrain from east to west. The entrance to the cave was until the 1992-1995 war mostly buried, but the entrance was dug up for the purpose of hiding the population and the army. The cave consists of an entrance hall, which is partly covered with broken stones from the ceiling, while the other part is under cave sediments, mostly composed of clayey soil and small rocks formed by the calcification process. The cave is wet throughout its entire surface due to dripping of water from the ceilings and a temperature that never exceeds 15 °C.

Rivers and streams, the largest river that flows through the territory of the municipality of Stanari is Ukrina. Beside it, the water network is also composed of the rivers Ilova, Radnja and Ostružnja and numerous streams, which all have places suitable for picnics and camping in pristine nature next to old watermills, cold drinking springs, grasslands and forests. Along the streams of the Ukrina, Ostružnja, Radnja can be found remains of abandoned watermills, of which only two on the river Radnja are functioning. The river Ukrina is especially interesting because it is largest rivers whose source and mouth are in the territory of Republika Srpska. Another curiosity related to this river is a special phenomenon when in mid-August, around the Transfiguration of the Lord, the river Ukrina "blossoms." This phenomenon lasts for several days, and it involves the covering of the river surface by whitish membranes, that are released by the immature male insects Palingenia longicauda, which remain on the surface of the water and create an image of water covered with petals flowers.

=== Archaeological Findings ===
Gradina (Brestovo) fortress, a medieval fortress on a steep low rock above the right bank of the river Ukrina. This horseshoe-shaped structure is about 23m in length and 13m in width. It consists of a round tower and a square enclosure. The outer walls are 2 m thick. Inside the building is a preserved cultural layer rich in fragments of earthen vessels that can be, at least in the upper layer, dated back to the 15th century.

Stećci, in the area of Stanari there are many sites with stećaks dating back to the Middle Ages, the most famous of which are the Greek cemeteries in Brestovo and Osredak. In addition to this, the sites from the prehistory which stand out are: Gypsy village in Brestovo, a prehistoric settlement above the Ukrine valley, where there were found remains of pottery from the Late Bronze or Iron Age, and the Matića Head, a Paleolithic station in Dragalovci.

=== Museum Cerovica ===
The Local Museum in Cerovica was founded by the Cerovica Parish led by priest Miroslav Živković. Through years of effort, collecting material traces of cultural heritage of Cerovic region, and help and support from locals and expert associates, a permanent exhibition was made in the museum in May 2014. The exhibition of the museum contains: archeological, ethnological, historical and library collections.

== Economy ==
The following table gives a preview of total number of registered people employed in legal entities per their core activity (as of 2018):

Activity	Total
Agriculture, forestry and fishing	4
Mining and quarrying	449
Manufacturing	37
Electricity, gas, steam and air conditioning supply	378
Water supply; sewerage, waste management and remediation activities	25
Construction	22
Wholesale and retail trade, repair of motor vehicles and motorcycles	57
Transportation and storage	35
Accommodation and food services	35
Information and communication	-
Financial and insurance activities	5
Real estate activities	-
Professional, scientific and technical activities	10
Administrative and support service activities	4
Public administration and defense; compulsory social security	72
Education	90
Human health and social work activities	29
Arts, entertainment and recreation	4
Other service activities	21
Total	1,277

=== Stanari Thermal Power Plant ===
The Stanari Thermal Power Plant which was commissioned in September 2016, is a 300 MW power plant in Bosnia and Herzegovina in the vicinity of the Stanari coal mine. It produces 2 million MWh of energy per year. The coal is supplied from the adjacent coal mine which underwent refurbishment in 2006 in order to provide a stable fuel supply to the power plant.

== Sport ==
- Football: FK "Rudar" Stanari
- Rugby: RK "Rudar" Stanari
