= List of power stations in Norway =

The following page lists some power stations in Norway. Norway produces a total of 13,570 MW for power consumption. For traction current, see Electric power supply system of railways in Norway.

== Hydroelectric ==
Station	Location	Geographical coordinates	Capacity (MW)
Alta Hydroelectric Power Station	Alta Municipality	69.7050116°N 23.8187027°E	150
Aura Hydroelectric Power Station	Sunndal Municipality	62°39′53″N 8°31′16″E	290
Aurland Hydroelectric Power Station	Aurland Municipality	60°51′18″N 7°18′17″E	1,128
Brandåa Hydroelectric Power Station	Rindal Municipality		4.1
Bratsberg Hydroelectric Power Station	Trondheim Municipality		124
Brokke Hydroelectric Power Station	Valle Municipality	59°7′41″N 7°30′50″E	330
Byrte Hydroelectric Power Station	Tokke Municipality		20
Evanger Hydroelectric Power Station	Voss Municipality	60°39′22″N 6°6′42″E	330
Finndøla Hydroelectric Power Station	Fyresdal Municipality		108
Fortun Hydroelectric Power Station	Luster Municipality	61°30′18″N 7°42′9″E	254
Gryta Hydroelectric Power Station	Rindal Municipality		1.49
Hammeren Hydroelectric Power Station	Oslo Municipality	59°59′48″N 10°45′0″E	5
Hjartdøla Hydroelectric Power Station	Hjartdal Municipality		104
Hol I Hydroelectric Power Station	Hol Municipality		220
Holen Hydroelectric Power Station	Bykle Municipality		328
Hylen Hydroelectric Power Station	Suldal Municipality		160
Kaggefoss Hydroelectric Power Station	Modum Municipality		85.5
Kobbelv Hydroelectric Power Station	Sørfold Municipality		350
Kvilldal Hydroelectric Power Station	Suldal Municipality	59.484444°N 6.672222°E; 59.528889°N 6.6538889°E	1,240
Kysinga Hydroelectric Power Station	Rindal Municipality		1.25
Lysebotn Hydroelectric Power Station	Sandnes Municipality		210
Matre Hydroelectric Power Station	Masfjorden Municipality	60°52′25″N 05°35′28″E	246
Mauranger Hydroelectric Power Station	Kvinnherad Municipality	60°7′57″N 6°19′52″E	250
Mår Hydroelectric Power Station	Tinn Municipality		180
Nea Hydroelectric Power Station	Tydal Municipality		175
Nes Hydroelectric Power Station	Nesbyen Municipality	60°36′16″N 9°4′11″E	250
Nore Hydroelectric Power Station	Nore og Uvdal Municipality	60°16′3″N 8°57′28″E	256
Nygårds Hydroelectric Power Station	Narvik Municipality	68.4758333°N 17.6258333°E	75
Øyberget Hydroelectric Power Station	Skjåk Municipality		105
Ramfoss Hydroelectric Power Station	Modum Municipality		30
Rana Hydroelectric Power Station	Rana Municipality	66°18′10″N 14°15′37″E	500
Saurdal Hydroelectric Power Station	Suldal Municipality		640
Sildvik Hydroelectric Power Station	Narvik Municipality	68.4108333°N 17.8008333°E	72
Sima Hydroelectric Power Station	Eidfjord Municipality	60°29′58″N 7°8′31″E	1,120
Svartisen Hydroelectric Power Station	Meløy Municipality	66°43′42″N 13°54′49″E	600
Svelgfoss Hydroelectric Power Station	Notodden Municipality		92
Såheim Hydroelectric Power Station	Tinn Municipality		185
Tjodan Hydroelectric Power Station	Sandnes Municipality		110
Tokke Hydroelectric Power Station	Tokke Municipality	59°26′40″N 8°2′18″E	430
Tonstad Hydroelectric Power Station	Sirdal Municipality	58°39′33″N 6°43′1″E	960
Tunnsjødal Hydroelectric Power Station	Namsskogan Municipality		176
Tyin Hydroelectric Power Station	Årdal Municipality	61°18′37″N 7°49′53″E	380
Tyssedal Hydroelectric Power Station	Ullensvang Municipality		100
Solhom Hydroelectric Power Station	Kvinesdal Municipality		200
Tjørhom Hydroelectric Power Station	Sirdal Municipality		120
Duge Hydroelectric Power Station	Sirdal Municipality		200
Åna-Sira Hydroelectric Power Station	Flekkefjord Municipality		150
Kvinen Hydroelectric Power Station	Sirdal Municipality		80
Roskrepp Hydroelectric Power Station	Sirdal Municipality		50
Vamma Hydroelectric Power Station	Indre Østfold Municipality	59°32′29″N 11°10′12″E	215
Vinje Hydroelectric Power Station	Vinje Municipality	59°37′0″N 7°51′24″E	300

== Other sources ==
Station	Location	Co-ordinates	Capacity (MW)	Type	Status
Mongstad Power Station	Mongstad	60°48′32″N 5°2′13″E	280	Natural gas	The plant was supposed to be closed at the end of 2018, but was still in operation as of 2021.
Tjeldbergodden Reserve Power Station	Tjeldbergodden	63°24′44″N 8°41′12″E	150	Natural gas	Not in use

== See also ==
- Electricity sector in Norway
- Energy in Norway
- List of power stations in Europe
- List of largest power stations in the world
