= Svorka Energi =

Norwegian power company

Svorka Energi AS is a Norwegian power company owned by Surnadal Municipality (41%), Heim Municipality (17%), Rindal Municipality (17%), and Møre og Romsdal county (25%). Its registered office is at Skei. The company's annual sales are approximately 200 million kr. The company is headed by Halvard Fjeldvær, who succeeded Erlend Eriksen in 2013.

The company consists of:

- Svorka Produksjon AS (a power generation company)
- Svorka Energi AS (a power supplier)
- Svorka Aksess (an internet service provider)

== Svorka Produksjon ==
Svorka Produksjon AS is a power generation company in Møre og Romsdal with its registered office in Surnadal. The company currently has an ownership interest in the following power plants:

- Valsøyfjord Hydroelectric Power Station (100% ownership)
- Svorka Hydroelectric Power Station (50% ownership, Statkraft 50%)
- Nordsvorka Hydroelectric Power Station (50% ownership, Statkraft 50%)
- Svorka District Heating Plant (75% ownership, Landbrukshuset 25%)
- Brandåa Hydroelectric Power Station (100% ownership)
- Grytdalen Hydroelectric Power Station (100% ownership)
