= Storakersvatnet =

Lake in Rana, Nordland, Norway

Storakersvatnet (Norwegian); Akersvatnet (Norwegian); Aagkelsjaevrie (Southern Sami)
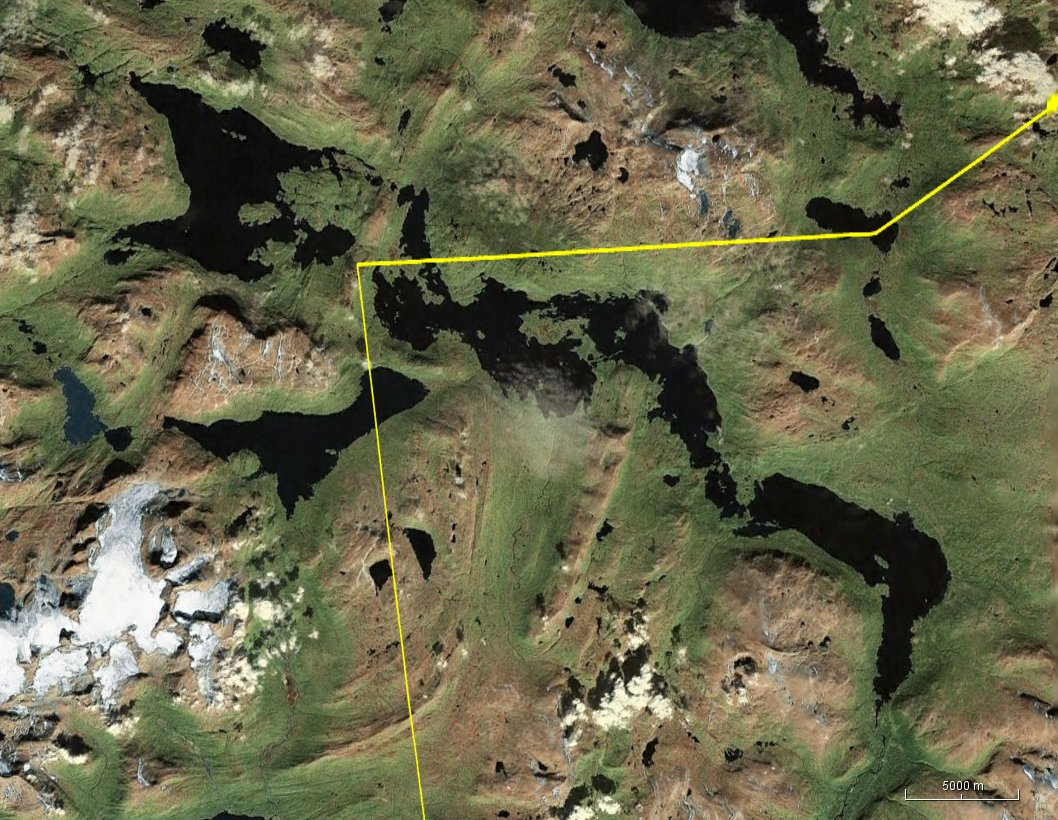
- Satellite view of Storakersvatnet (upper left lake)
- Interactive map of the lake
- Location: Rana Municipality, Nordland
- Coordinates: 66.1663°N 14.3935°E
- Basin countries: Norway
- Max. length: 11 kilometres (6.8 mi)
- Max. width: 7 kilometres (4.3 mi)
- Surface area: 42.3 km^{2} (16.3 sq mi)
- Shore length^{1}: 78.6 kilometres (48.8 mi)
- Surface elevation: 523 metres (1,716 ft)
- References: NVE
- ^{1} Shore length is not a well-defined measure.

Storakersvatnet (Norwegian), Akersvatnet (Norwegian), or Aagkelsjaevrie (Southern Sami) is a lake in Rana Municipality in Nordland county, Norway. The lake lies about 15 kilometres (9.3 mi) south of the town of Mo i Rana and less than 900 metres (0.6 mi) from the border with Sweden. The original lake was only 15.9 square kilometres (6.1 sq mi), but a dam was built at the northern end so that it can serve as a reservoir for the Rana power station. This dam has caused the lake to enlarge to an area of 42.3 square kilometres (16.3 sq mi).

== See also ==
- List of lakes in Norway
- Geography of Norway
- Rana Hydroelectric Power Station
