= Nordsvorka Hydroelectric Power Station =

Nordsvorka Power Station
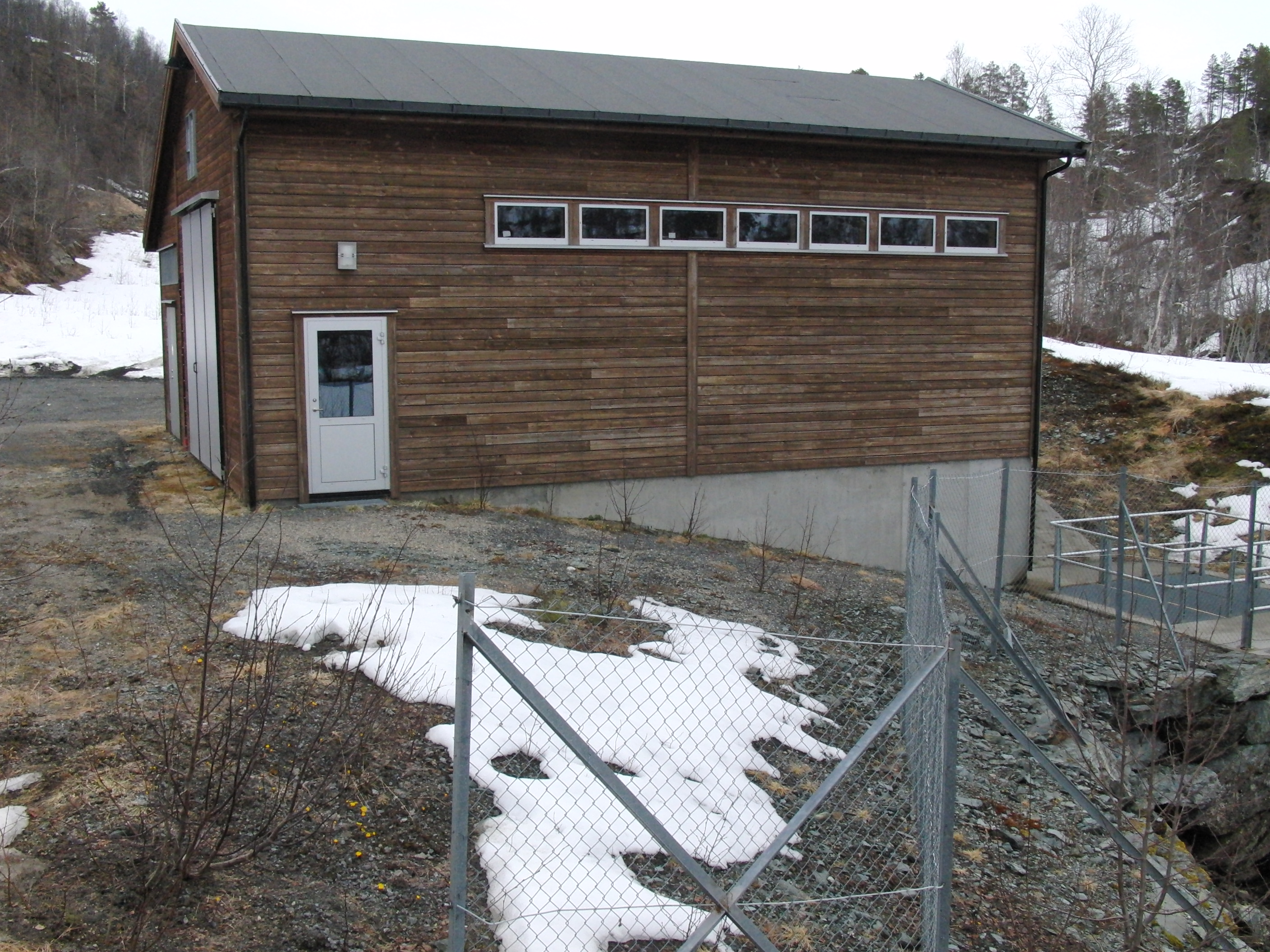
- Interactive map of Nordsvorka Power Station
- Official name: Nordsvorka kraftverk
- Country: Norway
- Location: Surnadal Municipality, Møre og Romsdal
- Coordinates: 63°1′57″N 8°50′13″E
- Status: Operational
- Opening date: 2007; 19 years ago
- Owners: Svorka Energi, Statkraft

Reservoir
- Creates: Geitøyvatnet

Power Station
- Turbines: 1 × 2.34 MW (3,140 hp)
- Annual generation: 12.5 GW·h

The Nordsvorka Hydroelectric Power Station (Norwegian: Nordsvorka kraftverk) is a hydroelectric power station in Surnadal Municipality in Møre og Romsdal county, Norway. It is located about 9 kilometers (5.6 mi) northeast of the village of Sylte. It utilizes a drop of 39 meters (128 ft) on the Nordsvorka River. The river flows from the lake Geitøyvatnet (approximately 336 meters or 1,102 feet) to the lake Langvatnet (approximately 276 meters or 906 feet). It has a Francis turbine and operates at an installed capacity of 2.3 megawatts (3,100 hp), and has an average annual production of about 12.5 gigawatt-hours (45 TJ). The plant came into operation in 2007 and is owned 50% each by Svorka Energi and Statkraft.
