= Surna (Norway) =

River in Trøndelag, Norway

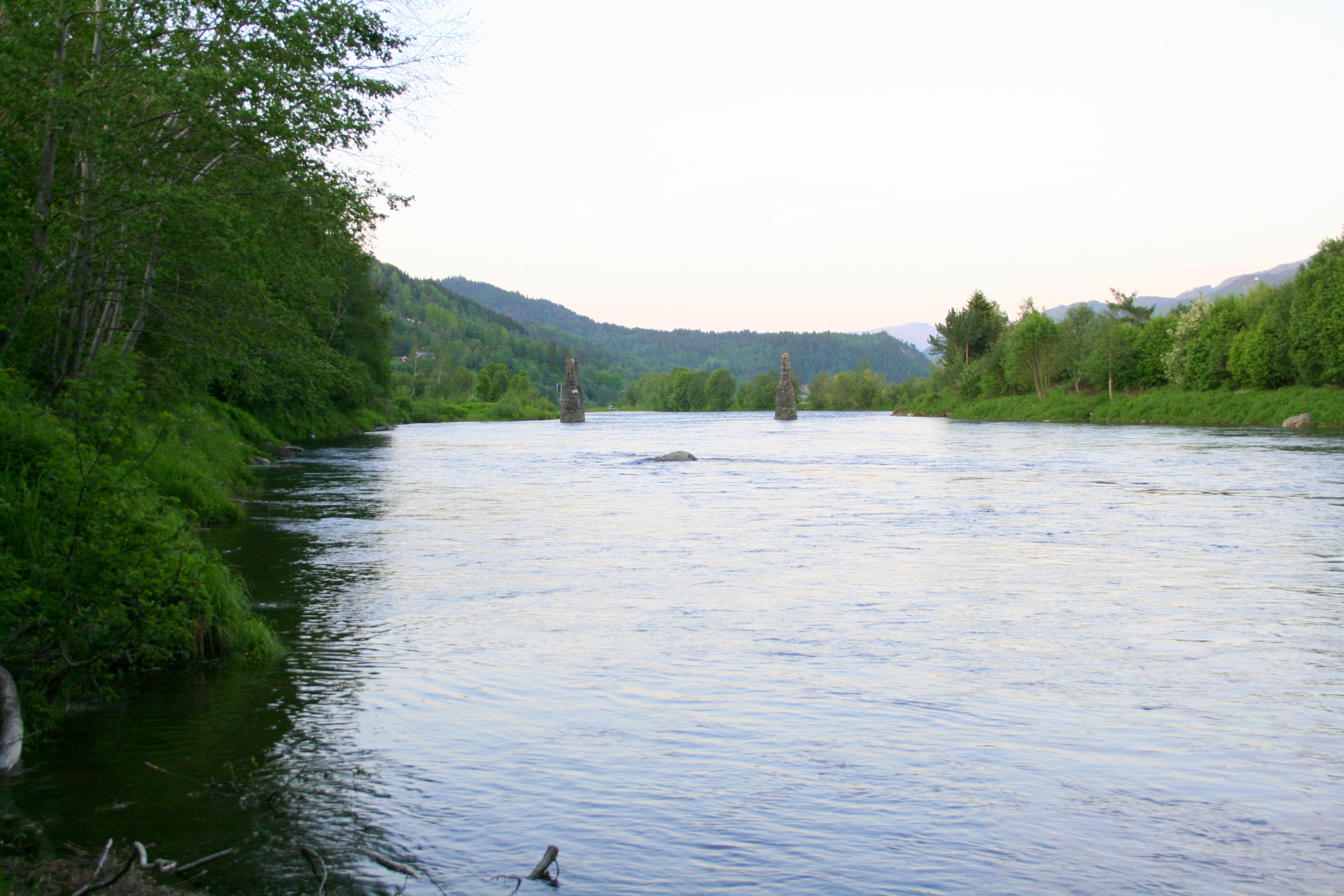
- Interactive map of the river

Location
- Country: Norway
- Counties: Trøndelag, Møre og Romsdal
- Municipalities: Rindal Municipality, Surnadal Municipality

Physical characteristics
- Source: Tiosen
  - location: Rindal Municipality, Trøndelag, Norway
  - coordinates: 63°05′42″N 09°17′51″E
  - elevation: 180 metres (590 ft)
- Mouth: Surnadalsøra
  - location: Surnadal Municipality, Møre og Romsdal, Norway
  - coordinates: 62°58′24″N 08°40′07″E
  - elevation: 0 metres (0 ft)
- Length: 45 km (28 mi)

Basin features
- River system: Tiåa and Lomunda
- Tributaries
  - left: Gåstjønna, Bølu, Folda, Vinddøla

The Surna is a river in Trøndelag and Møre og Romsdal counties in Norway. It runs from Rindal Municipality (in Trøndelag) to Surnadal Municipality (in Møre og Romsdal). The 45-kilometre (28 mi) long river begins near Øvre Rindal at the confluence of the rivers Tiåa and Lomunda. The river then flows west and empties into the Surnadalsfjorden at the village of Surnadalsøra. Several smaller rivers flow into the Surna from the Trollheimen mountains to the south. The Foldsjøen and Gråsjøen reservoirs along the Folda River also flow into the Surna. The river is a good fishing river. The Brandåa, Gryta, and Kysinga hydroelectric power stations operate on tributaries of the river.

== See also ==
- List of rivers in Norway
