= Valsøyfjord Hydroelectric Power Station =

Valsøyfjord Power Station
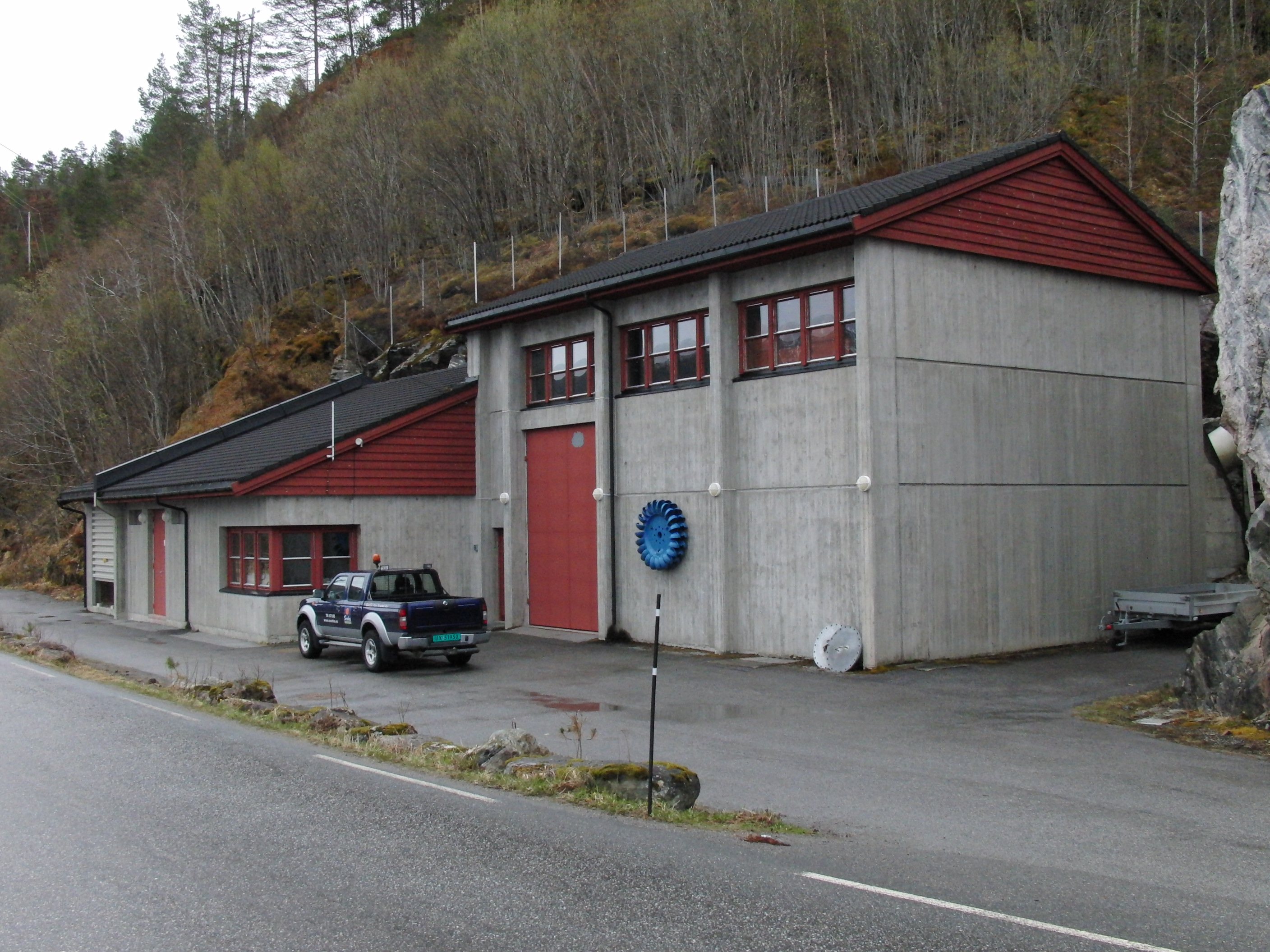
- Official name: Valsøyfjord kraftverk
- Country: Norway
- Location: Valsøyfjord, Trøndelag
- Coordinates: 63°7′16″N 8°34′5″E
- Status: Operational
- Opening date: 1942/1994
- Owner: Svorka Energi

Reservoir
- Creates: Englivatnet

Power Station
- Turbines: 4.28 MW
- Annual generation: 17.0 GW·h

The Valsøyfjord Hydroelectric Power Station (Norwegian: Valsøyfjord kraftverk) is a hydroelectric power station near the village of Valsøyfjord in Heim Municipality in Trøndelag county, Norway. It stands downstream from the Grytdalen Hydroelectric Power Station and is a run-of-river plant that utilizes a 187-meter (614 ft) drop on the Grytåa River. The river flows from the lake Englivatnet, which is regulated between 243 meters (797 ft) and 235 meters (771 ft), to the Valsøyfjorden. The plant has an average annual production of about 17 gigawatt-hours (61 TJ). The new plant came into operation in 1994, and is owned by Svorka Energi.
