= Rana Hydroelectric Power Station =

Hydroelectric power station in Norway

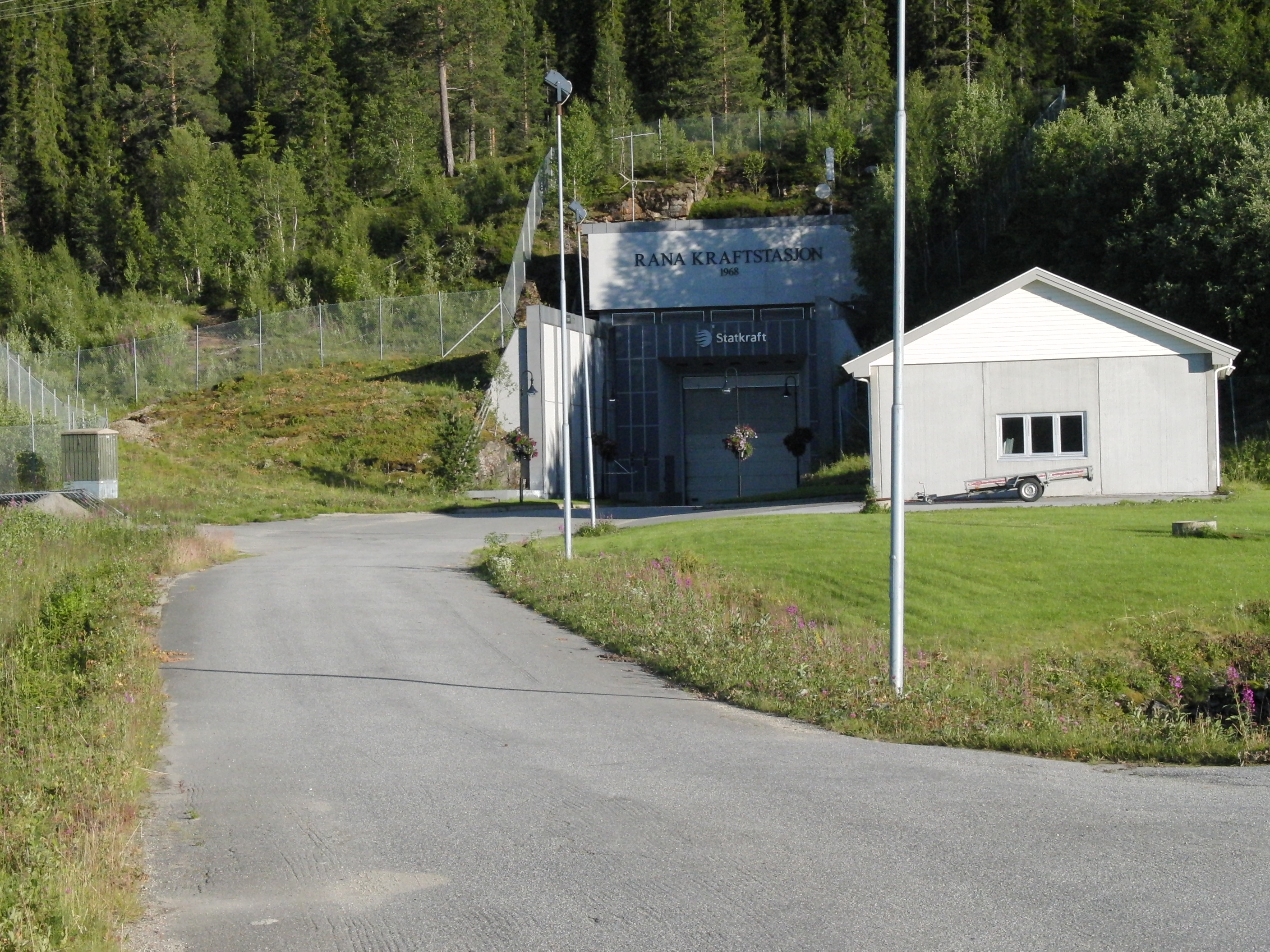
- Rana Hydroelectric Power Station
- Official name: Rana kraftverk
- Country: Norway
- Location: Rana Municipality
- Coordinates: 66°18′10″N 14°15′37″E
- Status: Operational
- Opening date: 1968; 57 years ago
- Owner(s): Statkraft

Upper reservoir
- Creates: Storakersvatnet

Lower reservoir
- Creates: Ranelva

Power Station
- Turbines: 4
- Installed capacity: 500 MW
- Capacity factor: 48.0%
- Annual generation: 2,100 GW·h

The Rana Power Station (Norwegian: Rana kraftverk) is a hydroelectric power station located in Rana Municipality in Nordland county, Norway. It operates at an installed capacity of 500 MW (670,000 hp), with an average annual production of about 2,100 gigawatt-hours (7,600 TJ). The station is owned by Statkraft. In terms of annual production in Norway the station is second only to Svartisen Hydroelectric Power Station.

== See also ==
- Storakersvatnet
- Ranelva
