= Storglomvatnet =

Lake in Meløy, Norway

Storglomvatnet (Norwegian); Stuorra Klupmajávrre (Lule Sami)
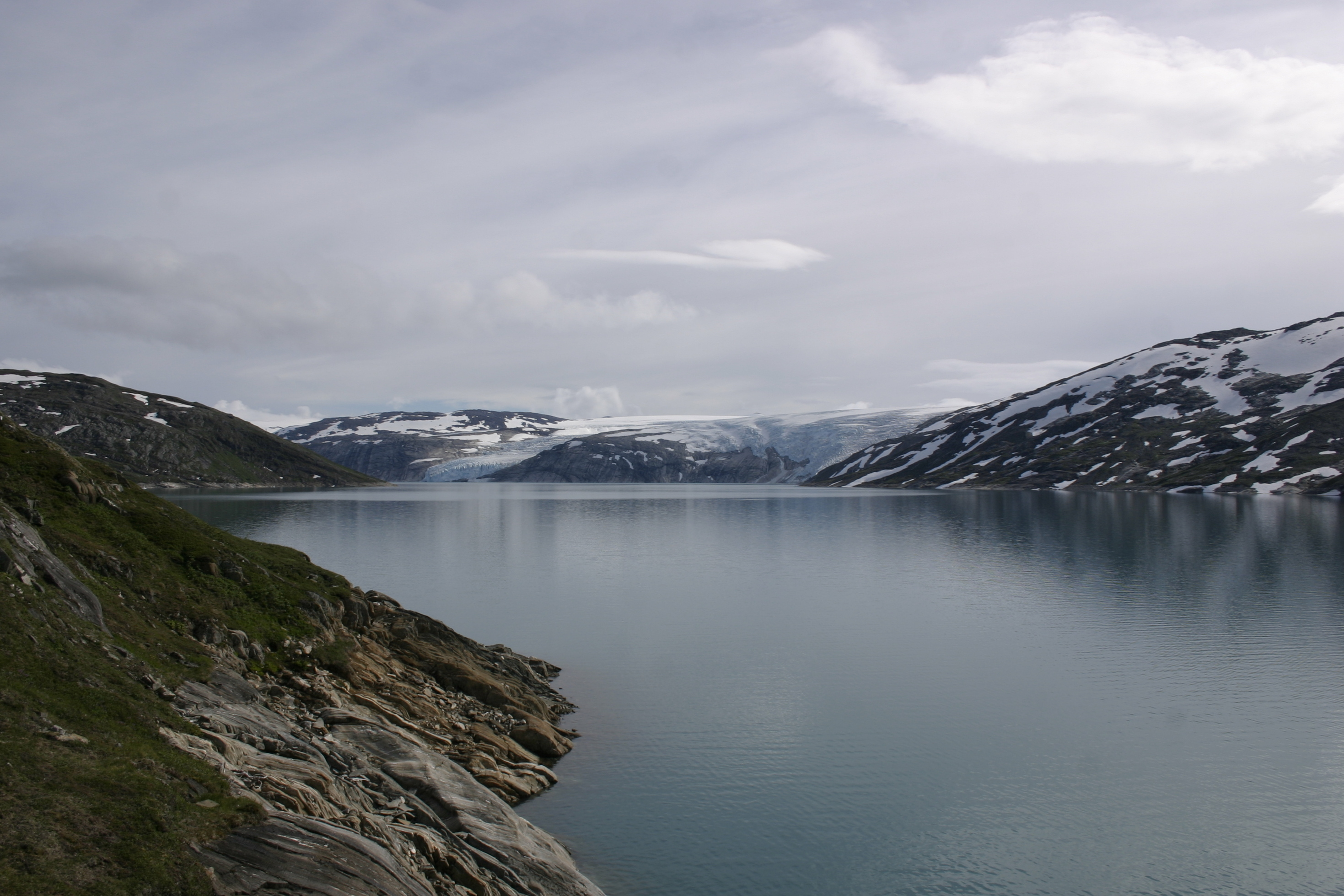
- Interactive map of the lake
- Location: Meløy Municipality, Nordland
- Coordinates: 66.7024°N 14.1118°E
- Basin countries: Norway
- Max. length: 12 kilometres (7.5 mi)
- Max. width: 8 kilometres (5.0 mi)
- Surface area: 28.59 km^{2} (11.04 sq mi)
- Shore length^{1}: 45.16 kilometres (28.06 mi)
- Surface elevation: 460 to 585 metres (1,509 to 1,919 ft)
- References: NVE
- ^{1} Shore length is not a well-defined measure.

Storglomvatnet (Norwegian) or Stuorra Klupmajávrre (Southern Sami) is a lake that lies in Meløy Municipality in Nordland county, Norway. It is located about 10 kilometres (6.2 mi) southeast of the village of Glomfjord, on the northeast edge of the Svartisen glacier. Storglomvatnet is a reservoir that serves the Svartisen Hydroelectric Power Station. The lake is part of a large watershed system. The lake is regulated at a height of 460 to 585 metres (1,509 to 1,919 ft) above sea level. This lake is also known as Grandma's lake to some locals.

== Media gallery ==
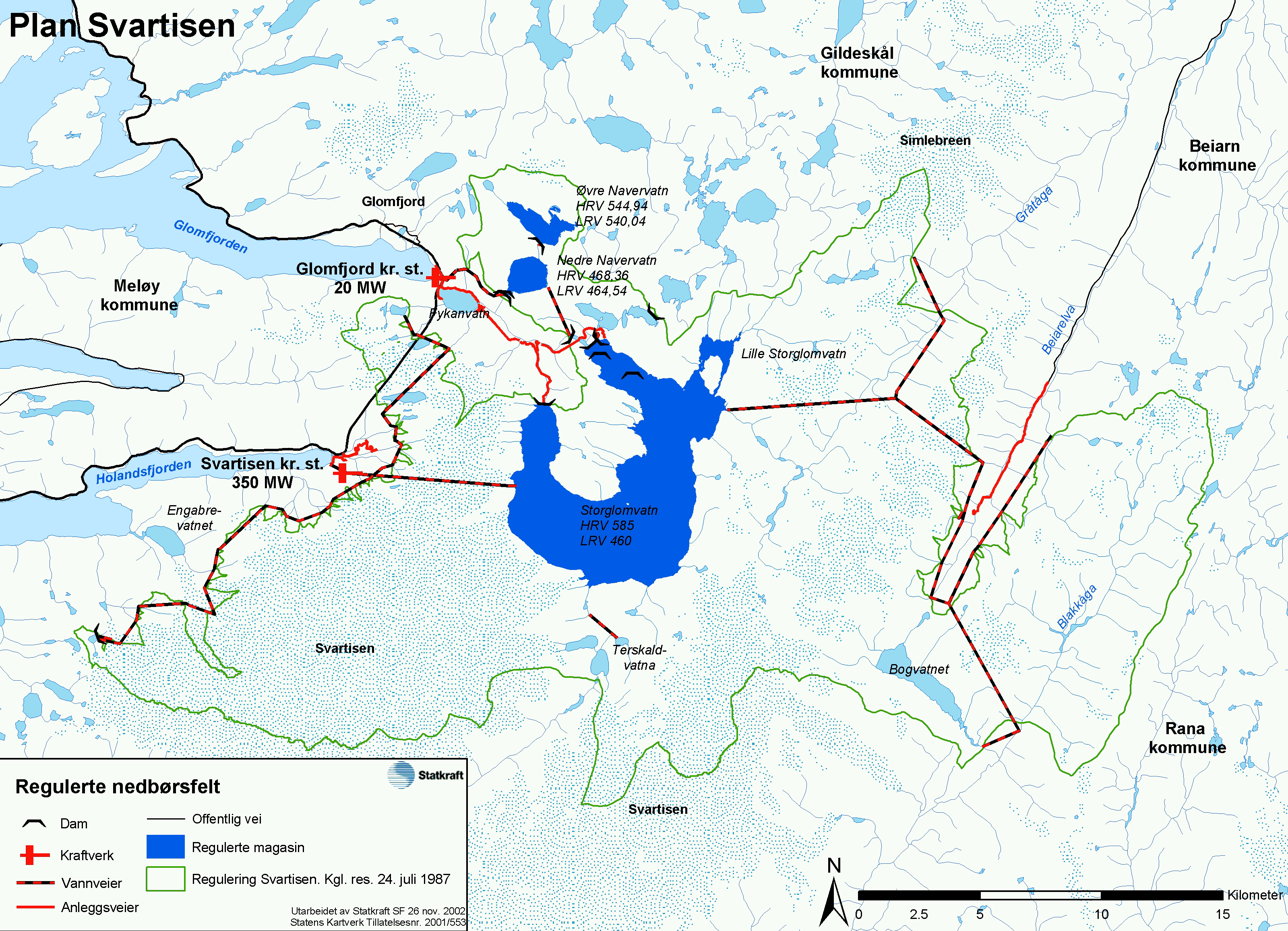
Map of Storglomvatnet watershed

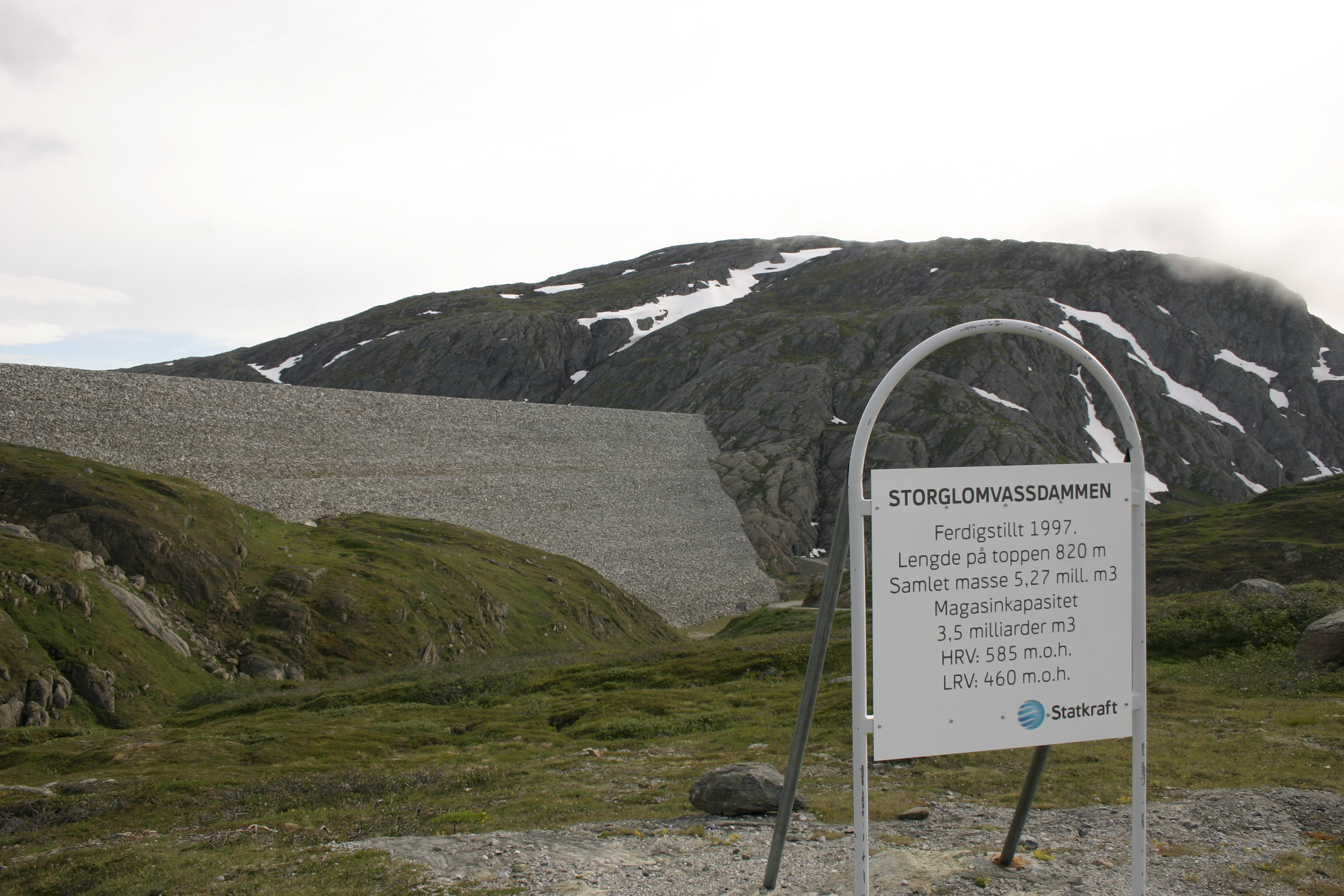
Storglomvassdammen is one of the two big dams that create Storglomvatnet; the other one being Holmvassdammen.

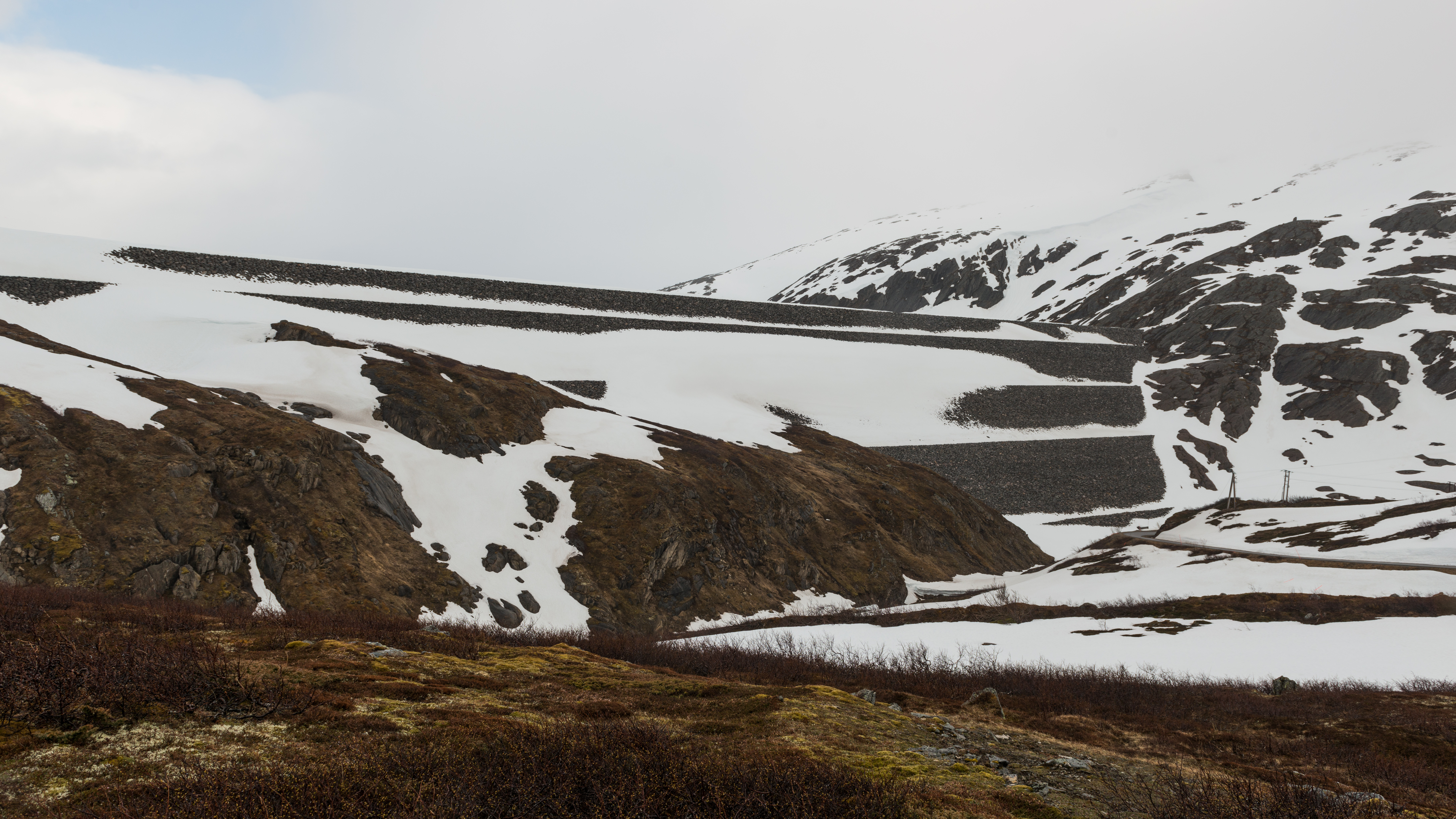
The snow-covered dam in June 2015

== See also ==
- List of lakes in Norway
- Svartisen Hydroelectric Power Station
