= Svorka Hydroelectric Power Station =

Svorka Power Station
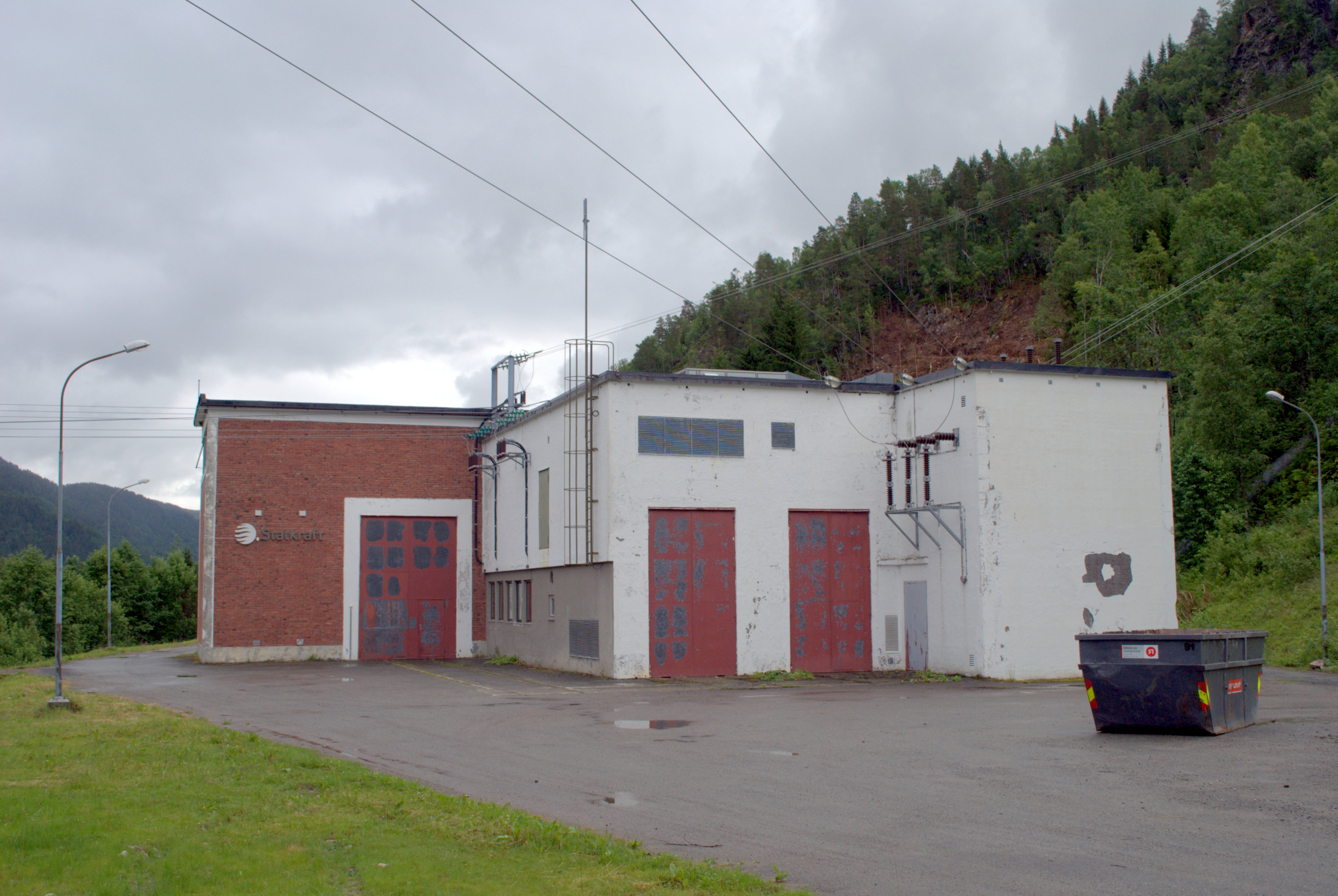
- Official name: Svorka kraftverk
- Country: Norway
- Location: Surnadal Municipality, Møre og Romsdal
- Coordinates: 63°2′20″N 8°39′20″E
- Status: Operational
- Opening date: 1963; 62 years ago
- Owner(s): Svorka Energi, Statkraft

Reservoir
- Creates: Langvatnet

Power Station
- Turbines: 1 × 25 MW (34,000 hp)
- Annual generation: 111 GW·h

The Svorka Hydroelectric Power Station (Norwegian: Svorka kraftverk) is a hydroelectric power station in Surnadal Municipality in Møre og Romsdal county, Norway. It is located about 4 kilometers (2.5 mi) northeast of the village of Bøverfjorden. It utilizes a drop of 260 meters (850 ft) from the lake Langvatnet, which is regulated between 274 meters (899 ft) and 276 meters (906 ft), to the Bøvra River. The Svorka River is also regulated for the plant. Its catchment area is 104.5 square kilometers (40.3 sq mi). Water is also transferred from several lakes: Litlbøvervatnet is regulated between 343 meters (1,125 ft) and 333 meters (1,093 ft), Solåsvatnet and Geitøyvatnet are regulated between 336 meters (1,102 ft) and 331 meters (1,086 ft), and Andersvatnet is regulated between 294 meters (965 ft) and 305 meters (1,001 ft). The plant has a Francis turbine and operates at an installed capacity of 25 megawatts (34,000 hp), and has an average annual production of about 111 gigawatt-hours (400 TJ). The plant came into operation in 1963 and is owned 50% each by Svorka Energi and Statkraft.
