= Grytdalen Hydroelectric Power Station =

Hydroelectric Power Station in Norway

Grytdalen Power Station
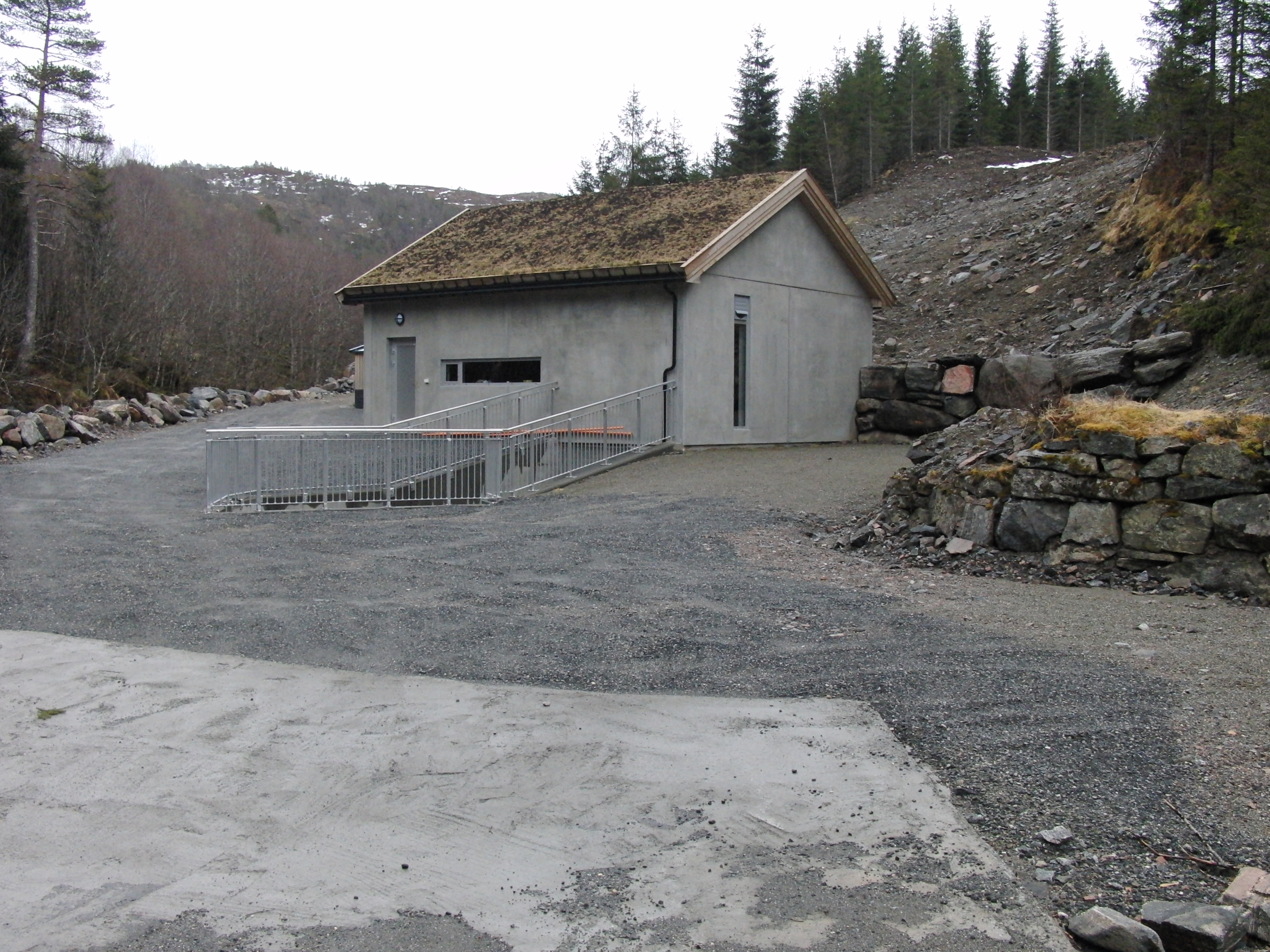
- Official name: Grytdalen kraftverk
- Country: Norway
- Location: Valsøyfjord, Trøndelag
- Coordinates: 63°6′32″N 8°33′32″E
- Status: Operational
- Opening date: March 2012; 13 years ago
- Owner(s): Svorka Energi

Reservoir
- Creates: Englivatnet

Power Station
- Turbines: 1 × 1.3 MW
- Annual generation: 5.3 GW·h

The Grytdalen Hydroelectric Power Station (Norwegian: Grytdalen kraftverk) is a hydroelectric power station near the village of Valsøyfjord in Heim Municipality in Trøndelag county, Norway. It stands near the Valsøyfjorden, about 1.8 kilometers (1.1 mi) south of the village of Engan. It is a run-of-river plant that utilizes a 50-meter (160 ft) drop from the lake Englivatnet to the intake dam of the Valsøyfjord Hydroelectric Power Station. It has a Francis turbine and operates at an installed capacity of 1.3 megawatts (1,700 hp), with an average annual production of about 5.3 gigawatt-hours (19 TJ). The plant came into operation in March 2012 and is owned by Svorka Energi.
