= Nes Hydroelectric Power Station =

Hydroelectric power station in Norway

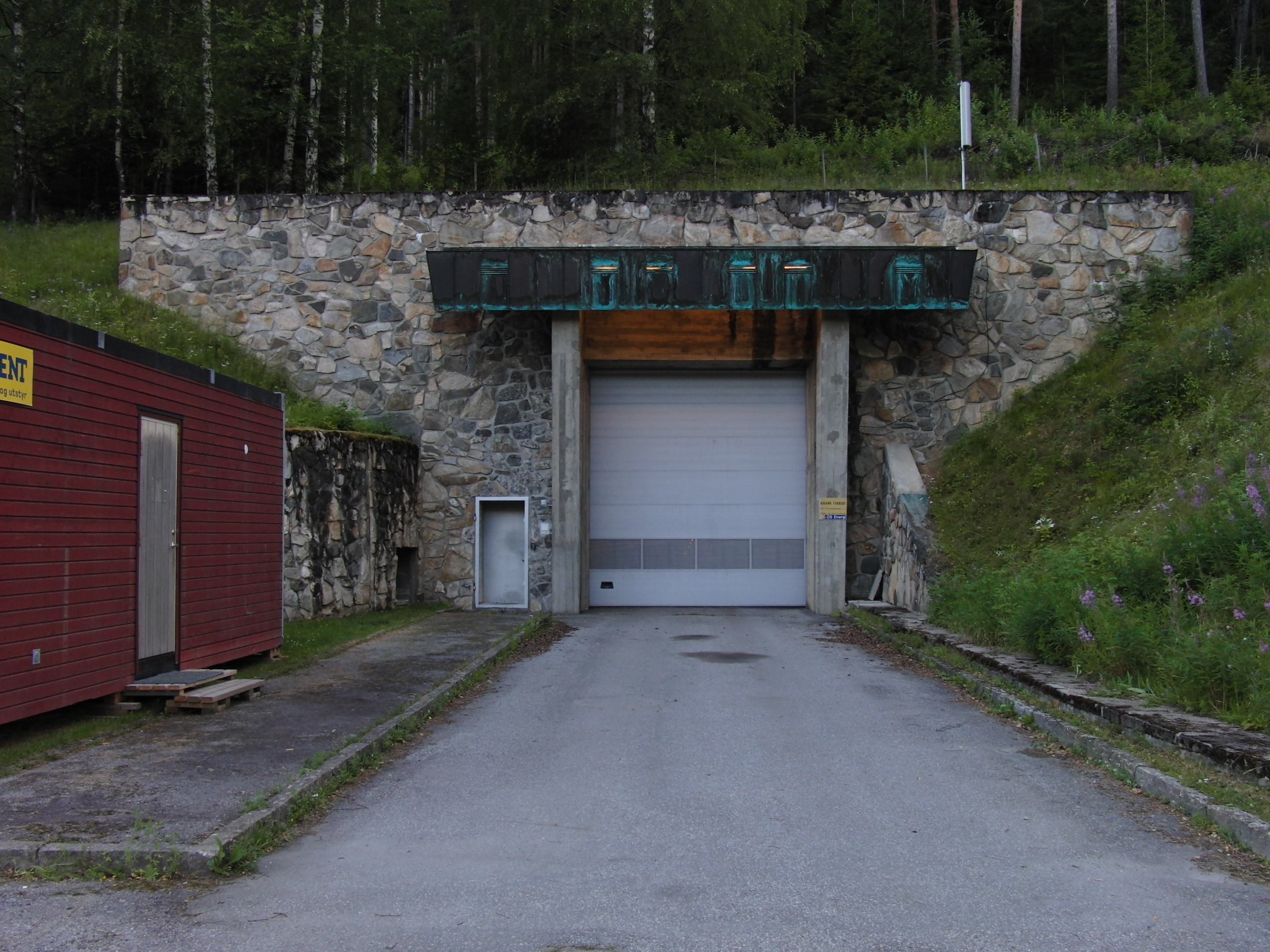
- Nes Hydroelectric Power Station
- Interactive map of Nes Hydroelectric Power Station
- Official name: Nes kraftverk
- Country: Norway
- Location: Nesbyen Municipality
- Coordinates: 60°36′16″N 9°04′11″E
- Status: Operational
- Opening date: 1967; 59 years ago
- Operator: E-CO Vannkraft

Power Station
- Hydraulic head: 285 m
- Turbines: 4 × 62.5 MW
- Installed capacity: 250 MW
- Capacity factor: 60.8%
- Annual generation: 1,330 GW·h

The Nes Power Station is a hydroelectric power station located in Nesbyen Municipality in Buskerud county, Norway. The facility operates at an installed capacity of 250 megawatts (340,000 hp). The average annual production is 1,330 gigawatt-hours (4,800 TJ). The station is operated by E-CO Vannkraft.
