= Fortun Hydroelectric Power Station =

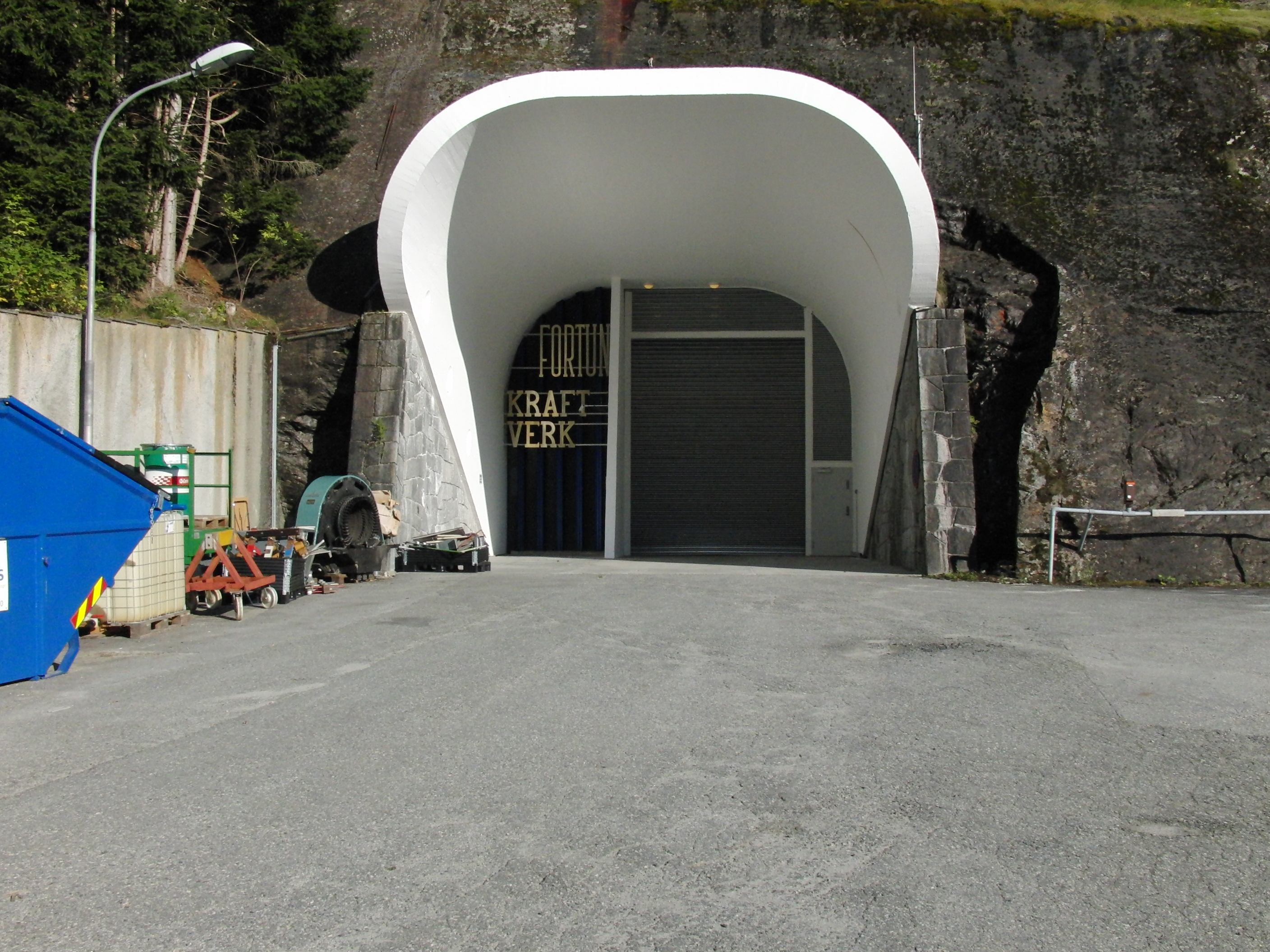
- Skagen kraftverk
- Interactive map of Fortun Hydroelectric Power Station
- Country: Norway
- Coordinates: 61°30′18″N 7°42′09″E
- Status: Operational

Upper reservoir
- Total capacity: 292×10^{6} m^{3} (0.292 km^{3})

Lower reservoir
- Creates: Fortundalen

Power Station
- Hydraulic head: 960 metres (3,150 ft)
- Installed capacity: 254 MW
- Capacity factor: 61.8%
- Annual generation: 1,375 GW·h

The Fortun Power Station is a hydroelectric power station located in Luster Municipality in Vestland county, Norway. The facility operates at an installed capacity of 254 megawatts (341,000 hp). The average annual production is 1,375 gigawatt-hours (4,950 TJ).
