= Mongstad Power Station =

Natural gas power station in Norway

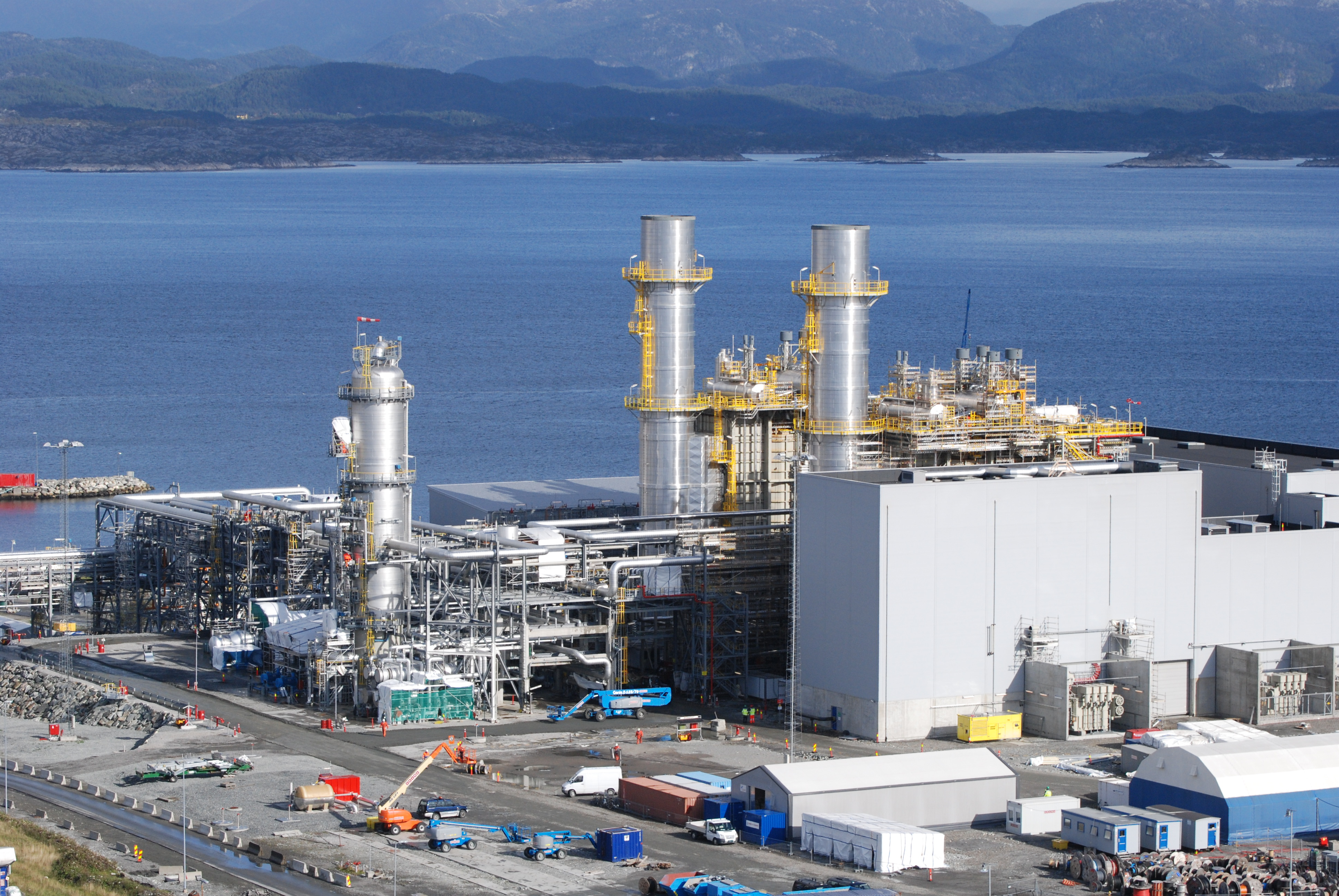
- Energiverk Mongstad, høsten 2009.
- Country: Norway
- Location: Mongstad
- Coordinates: 60°48′32″N 5°2′13″E
- Status: Operational
- Commission date: 2009
- Owners: Equinor; Ørsted A/S
- Operator: Ørsted A/S

Thermal power station
- Primary fuel: Natural gas
- Cogeneration?: Yes

Power generation
- Nameplate capacity: 280 MW
- Annual net output: 2,300 GWh

External links
- Commons: Related media on Commons

Mongstad Power Station is a natural gas-fired combined power plant and heating plant located at the industrial site of Mongstad in Norway.

The station is owned by a consortium of Equinor (formerly Statoil) and Ørsted A/S, and was operated by the latter, but in 2013 Ørsted divested their share, selling it to Statoil. Construction costs are estimated at NOK 4 billion. The power station will have an installed effect of 280 MW in electricity production and 350 MW in heat. The energy will be used to operate the Mongstad Refinery as well to supply the Troll Gas Field with power. The plant will use 0.7 billion normal cubic meter (BCM) of gas per year. Emissions of carbon dioxide will be 1.2 million tonnes.

The power station has been subject to controversy in Norway, based upon the potential increase in emission of greenhouse gases.

The closure of the plant has been postponed several times. The plant was supposed to be closed at the end of 2018, but was still in operation as of 2021.

== Related Reading ==
- CCS projects in Norway by Bjørn-Erik Haugan
