= Gryta Hydroelectric Power Station =

Gryta Power Station
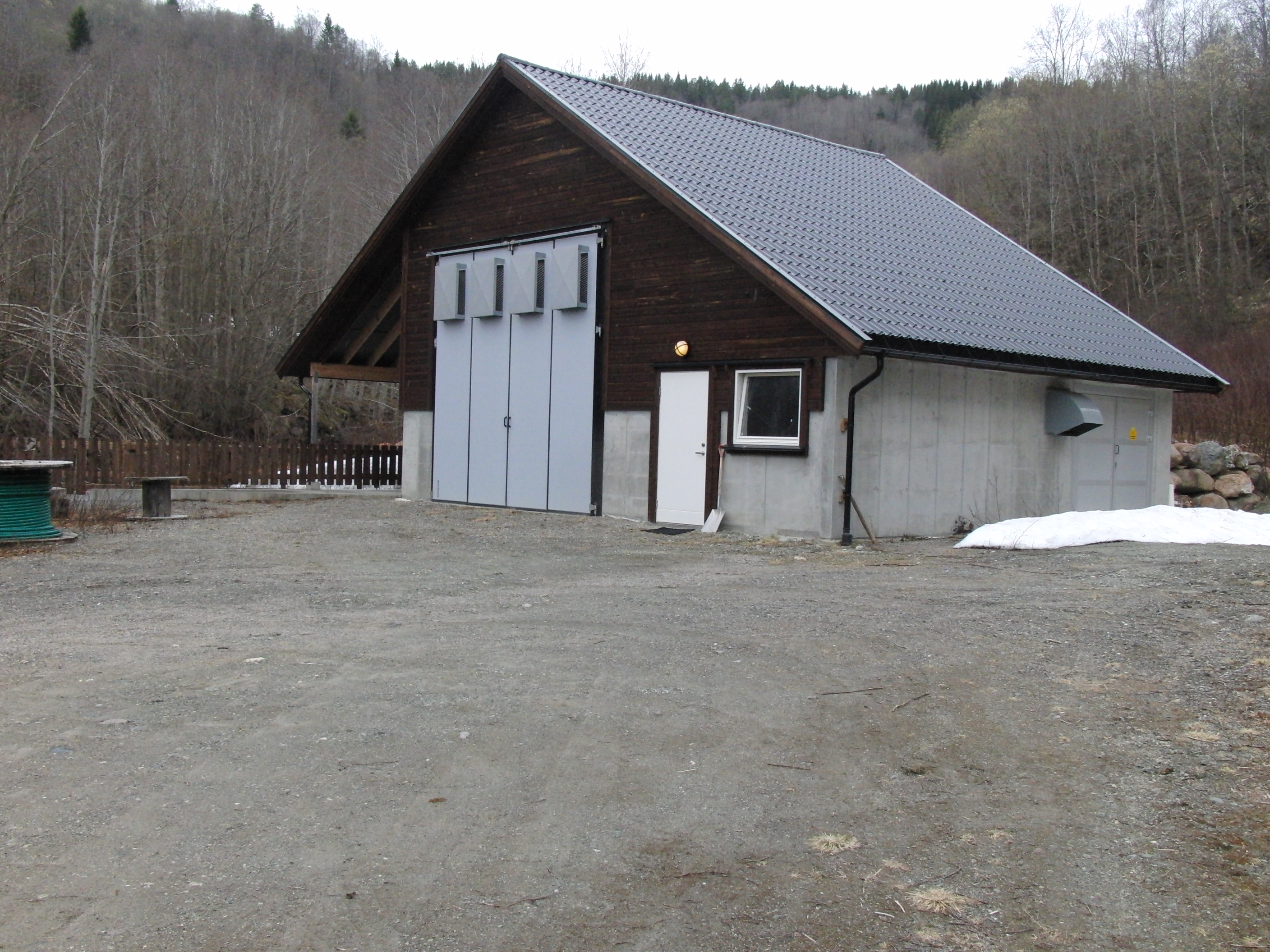
- Official name: Gryta kraftverk
- Country: Norway
- Location: Rindal Municipality, Trøndelag
- Coordinates: 63°03′20″N 9°10′39″E
- Status: Operational
- Opening date: 2009; 16 years ago
- Owner(s): Gryta Kraft AS

Power Station
- Hydraulic head: 231 metres (758 ft)
- Installed capacity: 1.49 MW
- Capacity factor: 34.5%
- Annual generation: 4.5 GW·h

The Gryta Hydroelectric Power Station (Norwegian: Gryta kraftverk) is a hydroelectric power station in Rindal Municipality in Trøndelag county, Norway. It is a run-of-river hydro power station utilizing a drop of 231 meters (758 ft) in a tributary of the Surna River. Permission was granted for construction in 2006 and the plant came into operation in 2009. It is operated by Gryta Kraft AS. It operates at an installed capacity of 1.49 megawatts (2,000 hp), with an average annual production of about 4.5 gigawatt-hours (16 TJ).
