= Hjartdøla Hydroelectric Power Station =

Hydroelectric power station in Norway

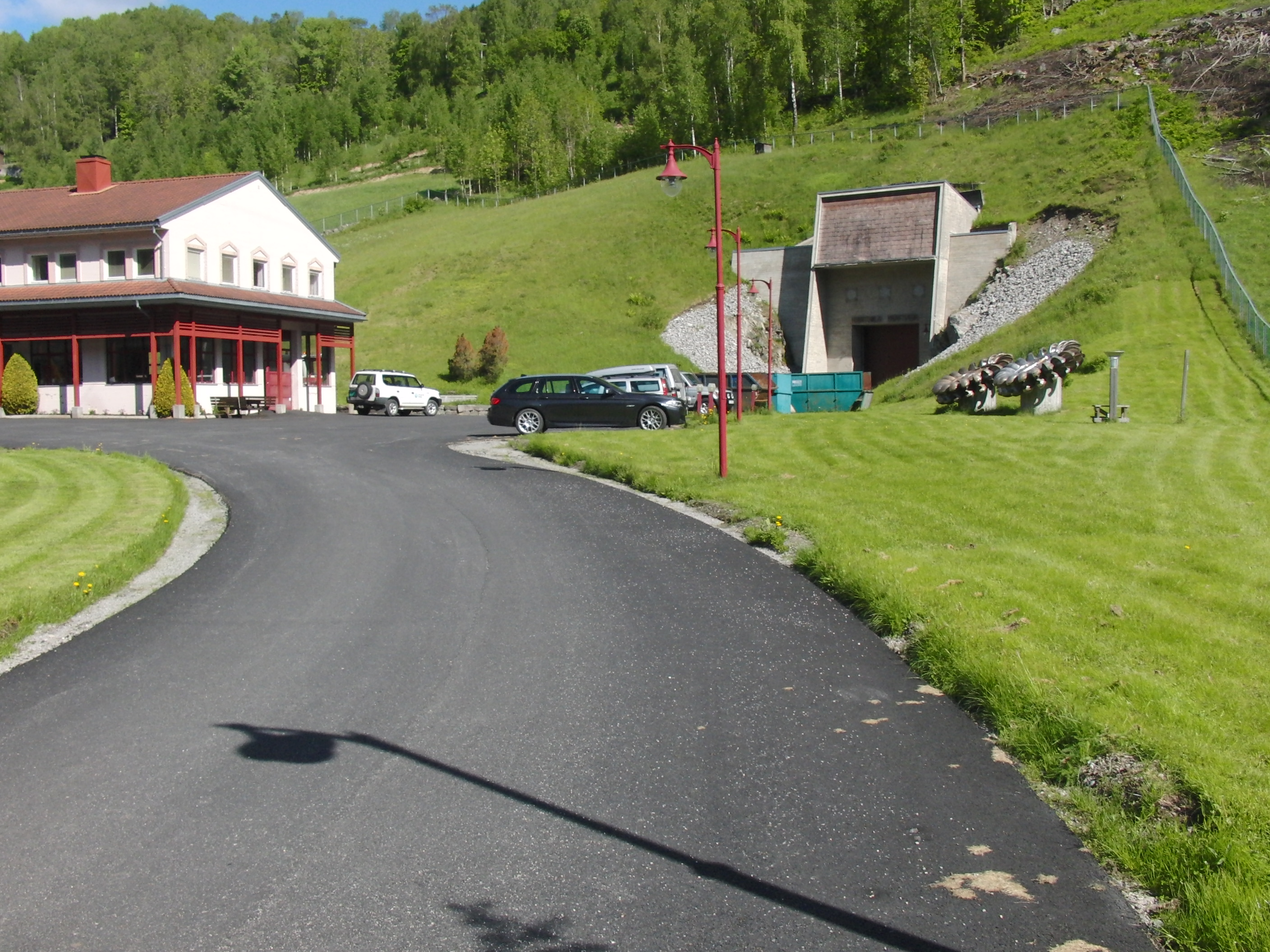
- Entrance to the Hjartdøla Power Station
- Interactive map of Hjartdøla Hydroelectric Power Station
- Official name: Hjartdøla kraftverk
- Country: Norway
- Location: Hjartdal Municipality
- Coordinates: 59°36′16″N 8°42′41″E
- Status: Operational
- Opening date: 1958; 68 years ago
- Owner: Skagerak Kraft

Power Station
- Hydraulic head: 555 m
- Turbines: 2
- Installed capacity: 120 MW
- Capacity factor: 39.0%
- Annual generation: 410 GW·h

The Hjartdøla Power Station is a hydroelectric power station located in Hjartdal Municipality in Telemark county, Norway. It operates at an installed capacity of 120 megawatts (160,000 hp), with an average annual production of about 410 gigawatt-hours (1,500 TJ).
