= Mår Hydroelectric Power Station =

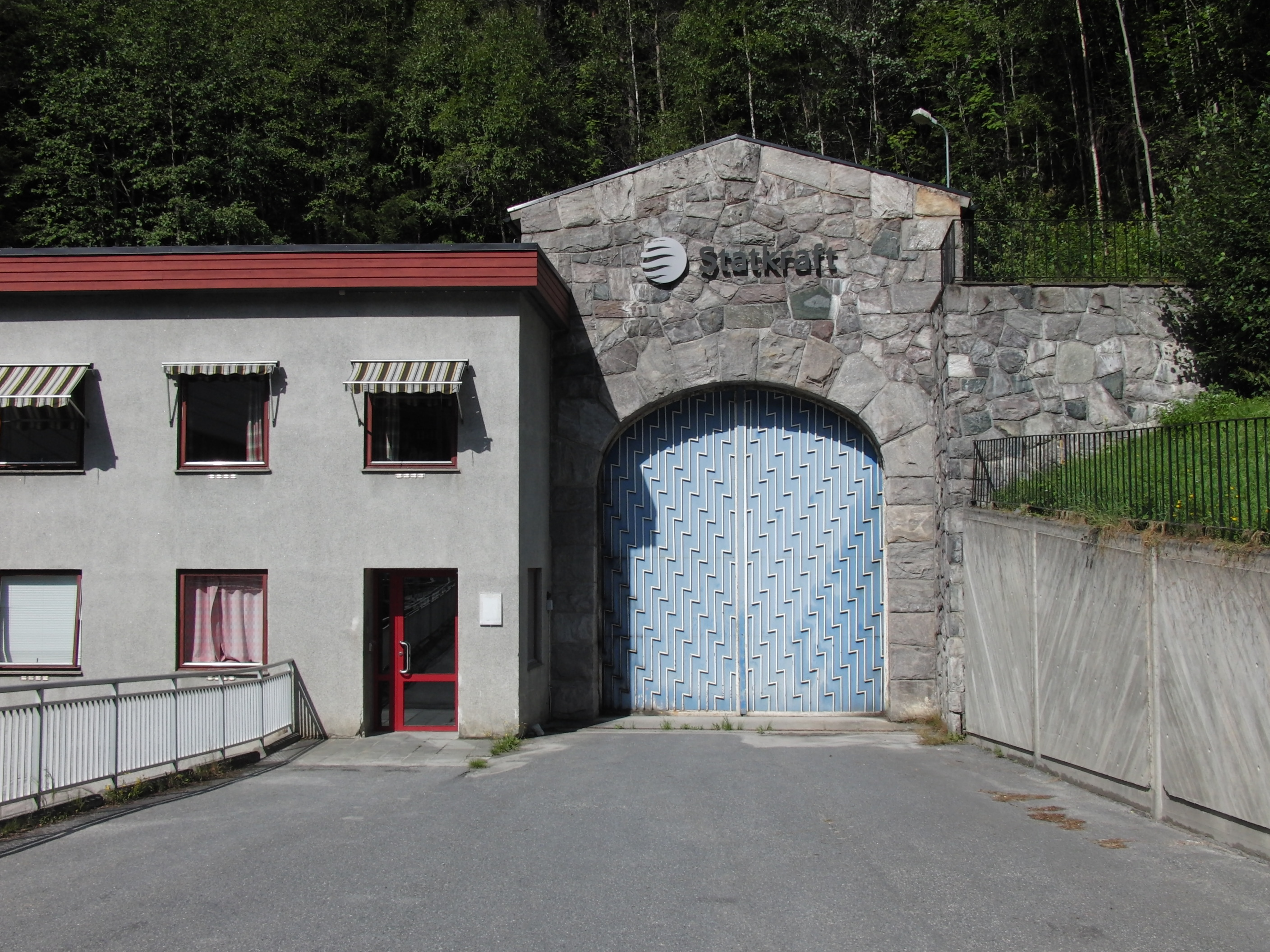
- Mår Hydroelectric Power Station in 2014
- Interactive map of Mår Hydroelectric Power Station
- Official name: Mår kraftverk
- Country: Norway
- Location: Tinn Municipality
- Coordinates: 59°53′04″N 8°40′36″E
- Opening date: 1948; 78 years ago
- Owner: Statkraft

Power Station
- Hydraulic head: 823 metres (2,700 ft)
- Turbines: 5
- Installed capacity: 180 MW
- Capacity factor: 72.7%
- Annual generation: 1,145 GW·h

The Mår Power Station is a hydroelectric power station located in Tinn Municipality in Telemark county, Norway. It operates at an installed capacity of 180 megawatts (240,000 hp), with an average annual production of about 1,145 gigawatt-hours (4,120 TJ).
