= Sildvik Hydroelectric Power Station =

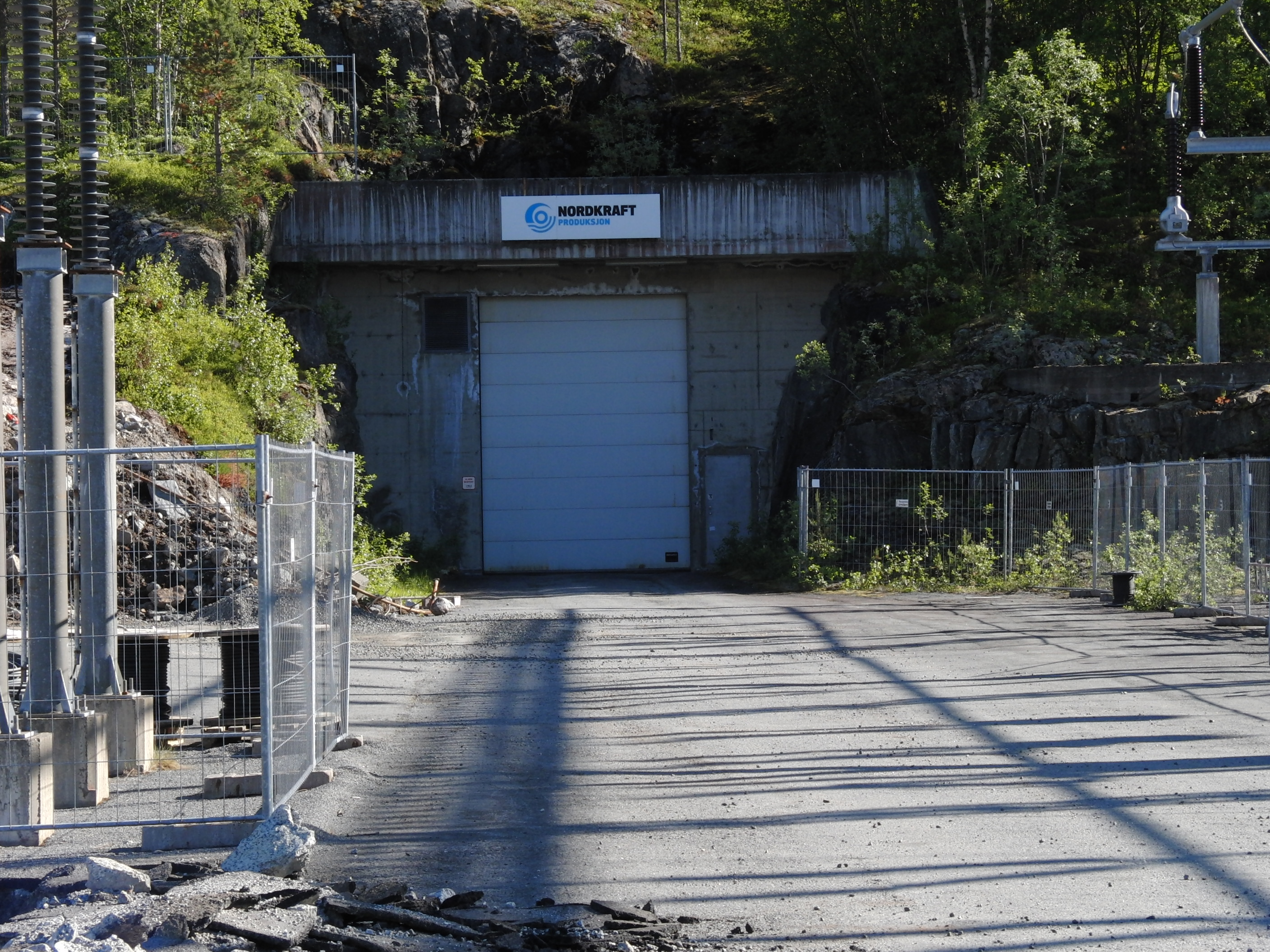
- Official name: Sildvik kraftverk
- Country: Norway
- Location: Sildvik
- Coordinates: 68°24′36″N 17°48′2″E
- Status: Operational
- Opening date: 1982; 43 years ago

Reservoir
- Creates: Indre Sildvikvann
- Total capacity: 94.9×10^{6} m^{3} (94.9 hm^{3})

Power Station
- Hydraulic head: 620–680 m
- Turbines: 1
- Installed capacity: 63 MW
- Capacity factor: 39.9%
- Annual generation: 220 GW·h

Sildvik Hydroelectric Power Station is a hydroelectric power plant in Sildvik in Narvik Municipality. It was inaugurated in 1982 and has a power of 63 megawatts (84,000 hp).
