= Nea Hydroelectric Power Station =

Hydroelectric power station in Norway

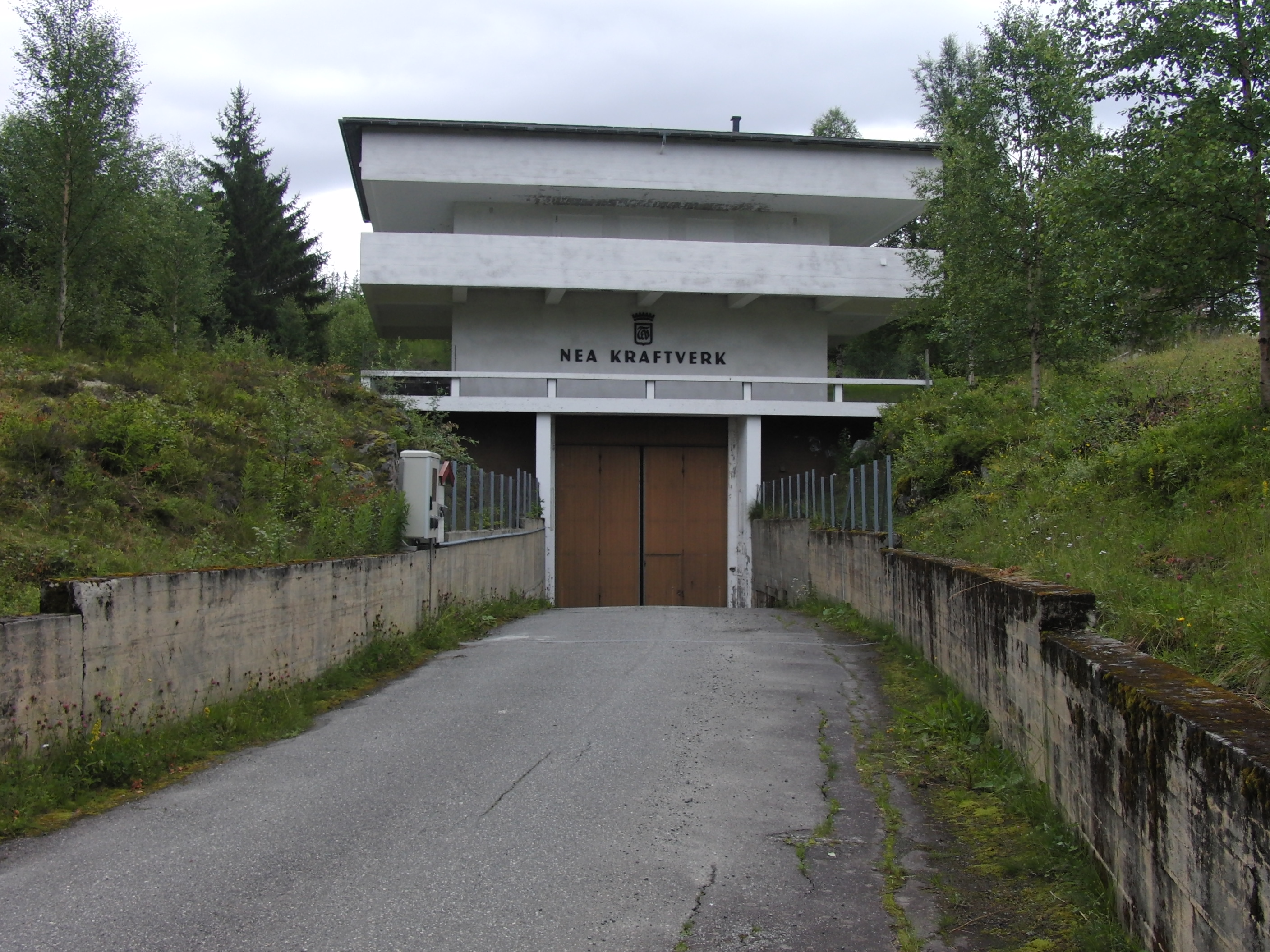
- Nea Hydroelectric Power Station
- Official name: Nea kraftverk
- Country: Norway
- Location: Tydal Municipality
- Coordinates: 63°01′54″N 11°40′49″E
- Status: Operational
- Commission date: 1960
- Owner: Statkraft
- Operator: Statkraft Energi

Tidal power station
- Tidal range: 375 m (1,230 ft); 377 m (1,237 ft)

Power generation
- Nameplate capacity: 175 MW
- Capacity factor: 44.1%
- Annual net output: 675 GW·h

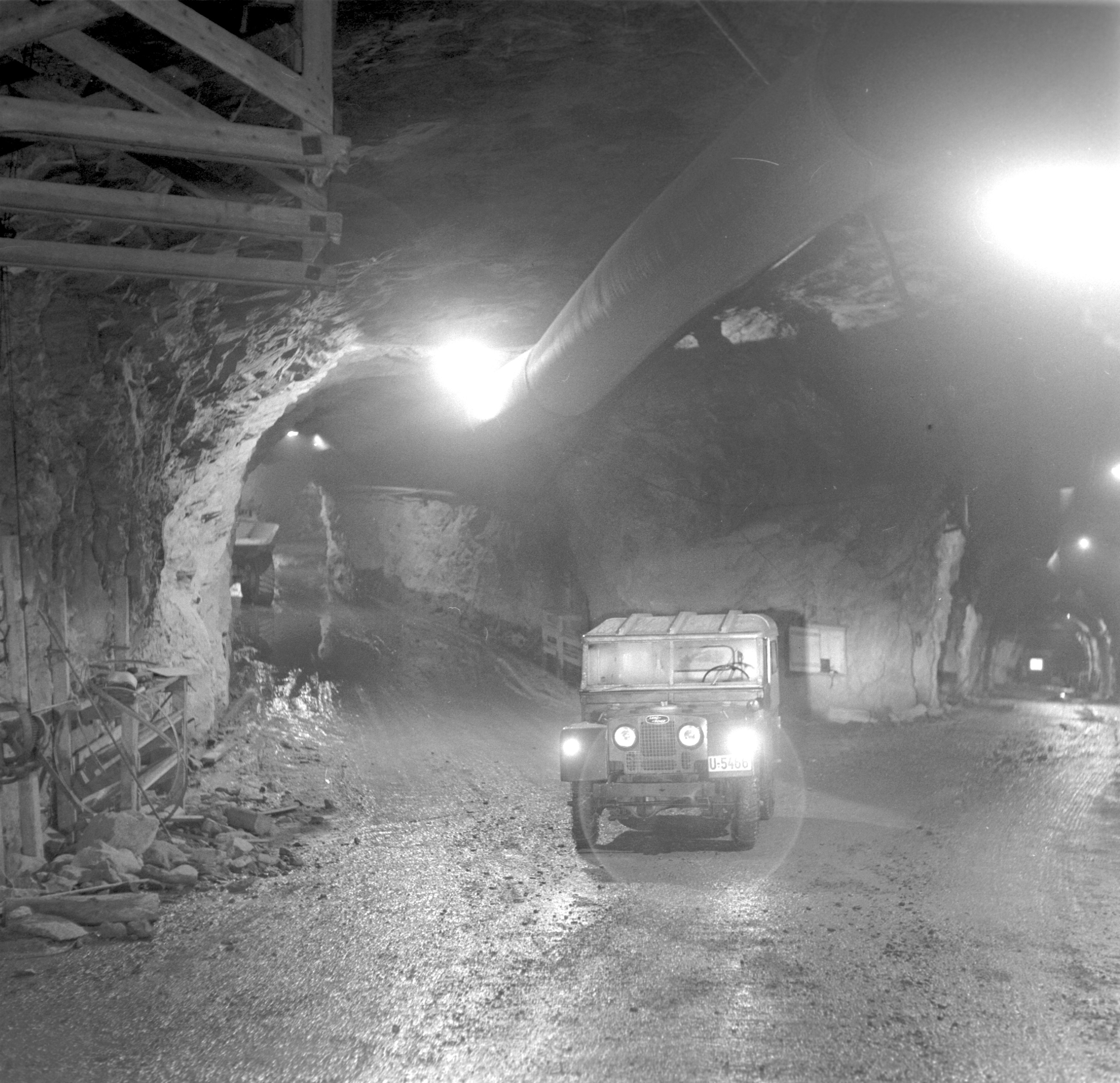
Nea Hydroelectric Power Station tunnel during construction in 1958, Tydal Municipality within Trøndelag county, Norway

The Nea Power Station is a hydroelectric power station located in Tydal Municipality in Trøndelag county, Norway. It operates at an installed capacity of 175 megawatts (235,000 hp), with an average annual production of 675 gigawatt-hours (2,430 TJ).
