= Finndøla Hydroelectric Power Station =

Hydroelectric power station in Norway

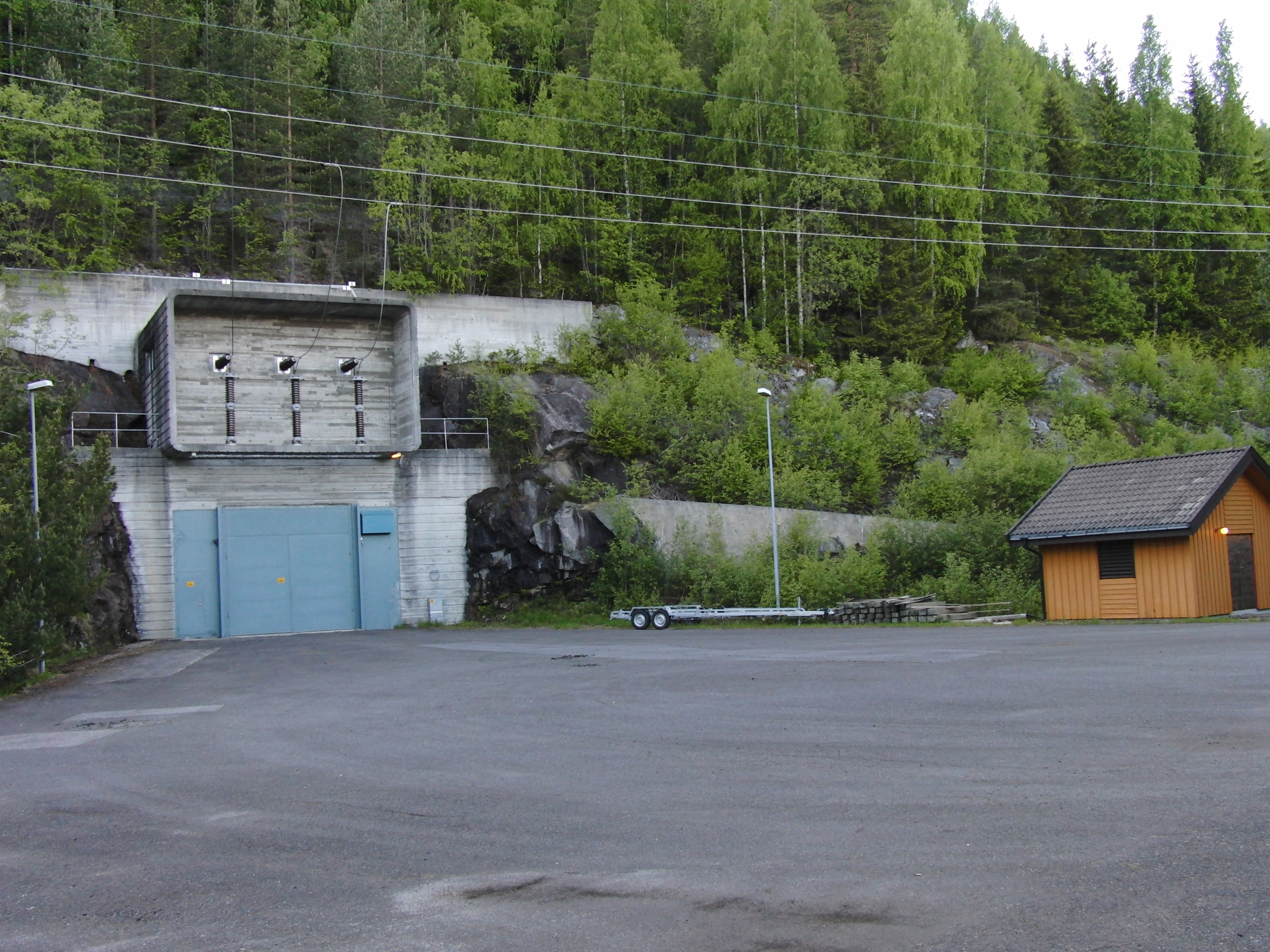
- Entrance to the Finndøla Power Station
- Interactive map of Finndøla Hydroelectric Power Station
- Official name: Finndøla kraftverk
- Country: Norway
- Location: Fyresdal Municipality
- Coordinates: 59°11′03″N 8°03′14″E
- Status: Operational

Power Station
- Hydraulic head: 298 m
- Installed capacity: 108 MW
- Capacity factor: 26.8%
- Annual generation: 254 GW·h

The Finndøla Power Station is a hydroelectric power station located in Fyresdal Municipality in Telemark county, Norway. It operates at an installed capacity of 108 megawatts (145,000 hp), with an average annual production of about 254 gigawatt-hours (910 TJ).
