= Mongstad =

Industrial site in Vestland county, Norway

- Industrial site
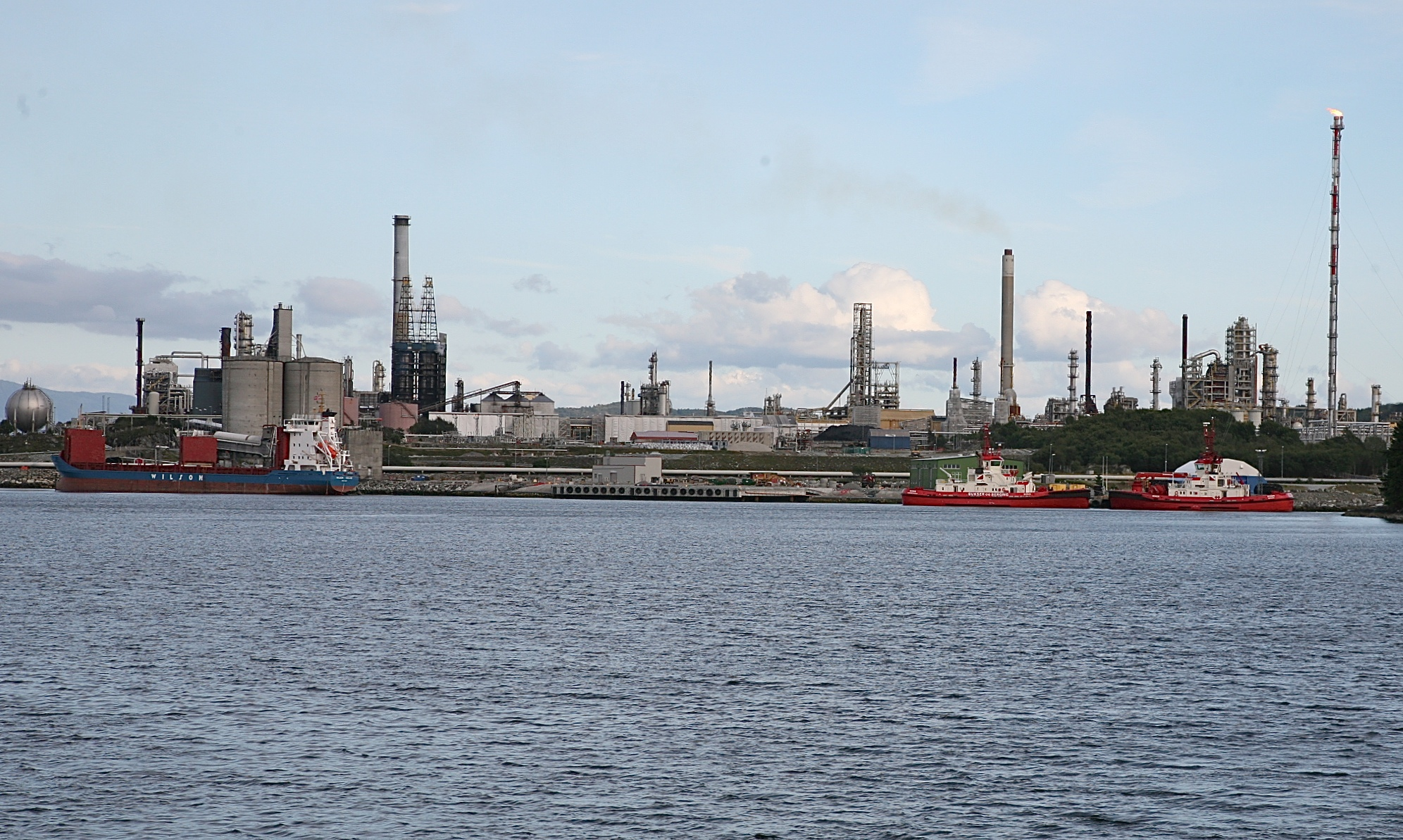
- View of the site
- Interactive map of Mongstad
- Coordinates: 60.81129°N 5.03298°E
- Country: Norway
- Region: Western Norway
- County: Vestland
- District: Nordhordland
- Municipality: Austrheim Municipality; Alver Municipality
- Elevation: 15 m (49 ft)
- Time zone: UTC+01:00 (CET)
  - Summer (DST): UTC+02:00 (CEST)
- Post Code: 5954 Mongstad

Mongstad is an industrial site in Vestland county, Norway. The site sits on the border of Alver Municipality and Austrheim Municipality, with most of the site being located within Alver Municipality. The site features an oil refinery for Equinor and other oil companies, including Shell. At Mongstad, Equinor has a crude oil terminal with a capacity of 9.5 million barrels (1,510,000 m^{3}). The port at Mongstad is the largest in Norway, measured in tonnage. The refinery at Mongstad is modern, and has been extensively upgraded, with a capacity of 12 million tonnes of crude oil per year (230,000 barrels per day). The refinery is the largest in Norway, though medium-sized by European standards. It is owned by a company called Mongstad Refining, of which Equinor is the sole owner (since 2012).

All the crude oil refined at Mongstad comes from the North Sea. The largest production is petrol, diesel, jet fuel, and light petroleum products. The heaviest components are used to make petrol coke, an important ingredient in anodes for aluminum production.

In 2010, Equinor and Ørsted opened the Mongstad Power Station, a natural gas-fired thermal power plant, to provide the site with heat energy and electricity, as well as power to the Troll gas field.

== History ==
The first use of the site was in 1975, when Statoil opened its refinery. At the end of the 1980s, the refinery was expanded to the tune of 14 billion kr, resulting in the Mongstad scandal after a 6 billion kr overexpenditure on the facility, costing several Statoil executives their jobs. In the time of the "Mongstad scandal" as it was called, a "Mong" was colloquially used as a term to represent the amount of 6 billion kr.

Statoil built a natural gas-fired thermal power plant at Mongstad in 2010. The carbon dioxide emissions that were predicted to result aroused public controversy as the project was being built.
