= Kysinga Hydroelectric Power Station =

Kysinga Power Station
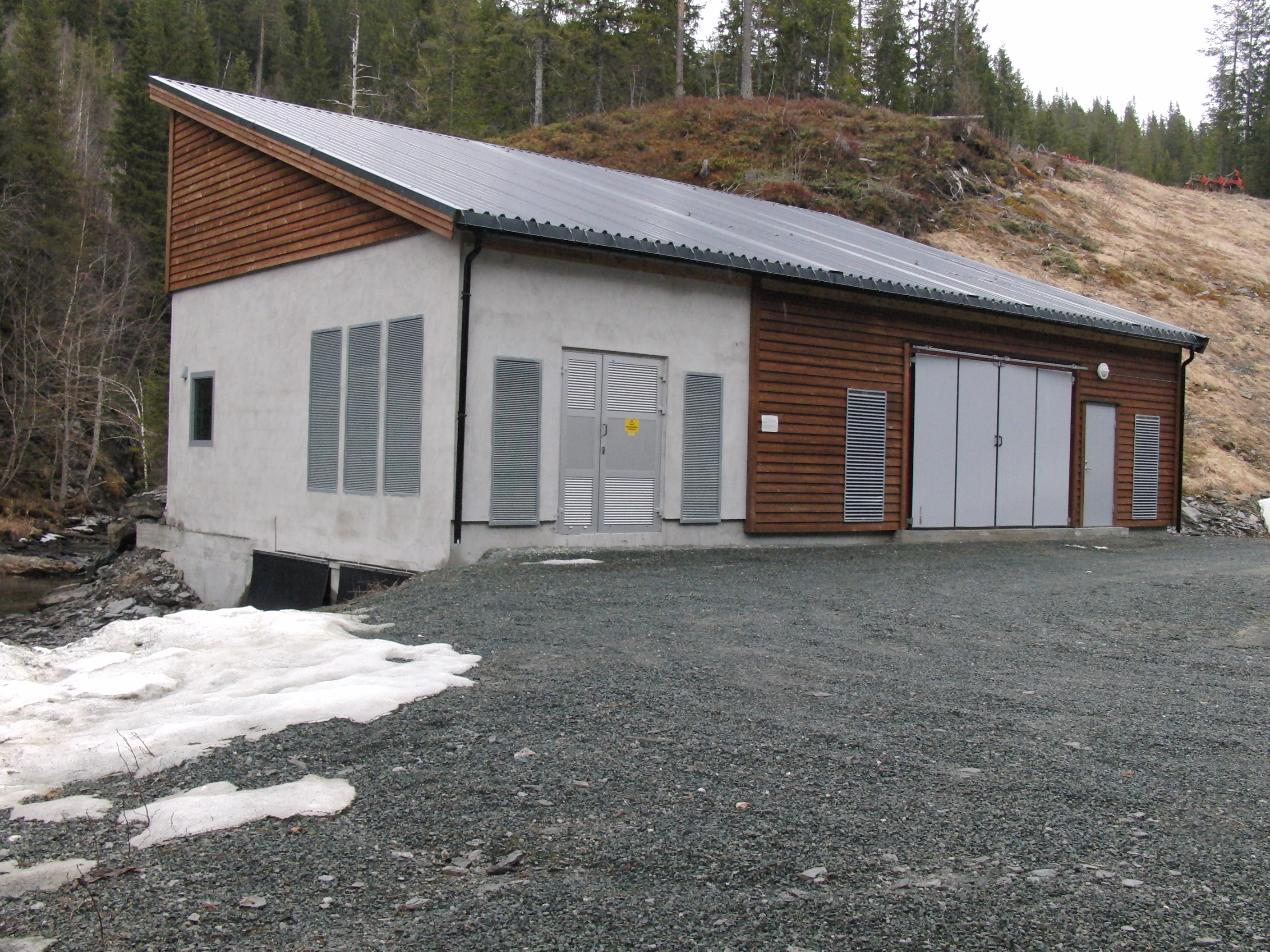
- Official name: Kysinga kraftverk
- Country: Norway
- Location: Rindal Municipality, Møre og Romsdal
- Coordinates: 63°01′06″N 9°21′53″E
- Status: Operational
- Opening date: 2010; 15 years ago
- Owner(s): Kysinga Kraft AS

Power Station
- Hydraulic head: 135 metres (443 ft)
- Installed capacity: 1.25 MW
- Capacity factor: 59.4%
- Annual generation: 6.5 GW·h

The Kysinga Hydroelectric Power Station (Norwegian: Kysinga kraftverk) is a hydroelectric power station in Rindal Municipality in Trøndelag county, Norway. It is a run-of-river hydro power station utilizing a drop of 135 meters (443 ft) on a tributary of the Surna River. Permission was granted for construction in 2009 and the plant came into operation in 2010. It is operated by Kysinga Kraft AS. It operates at an installed capacity of 1.25 megawatts (1,680 hp), with an average annual production of about 6.5 gigawatt-hours (23 TJ).
