= Svartisen Hydroelectric Power Station =

Hydroelectric power station in Norway

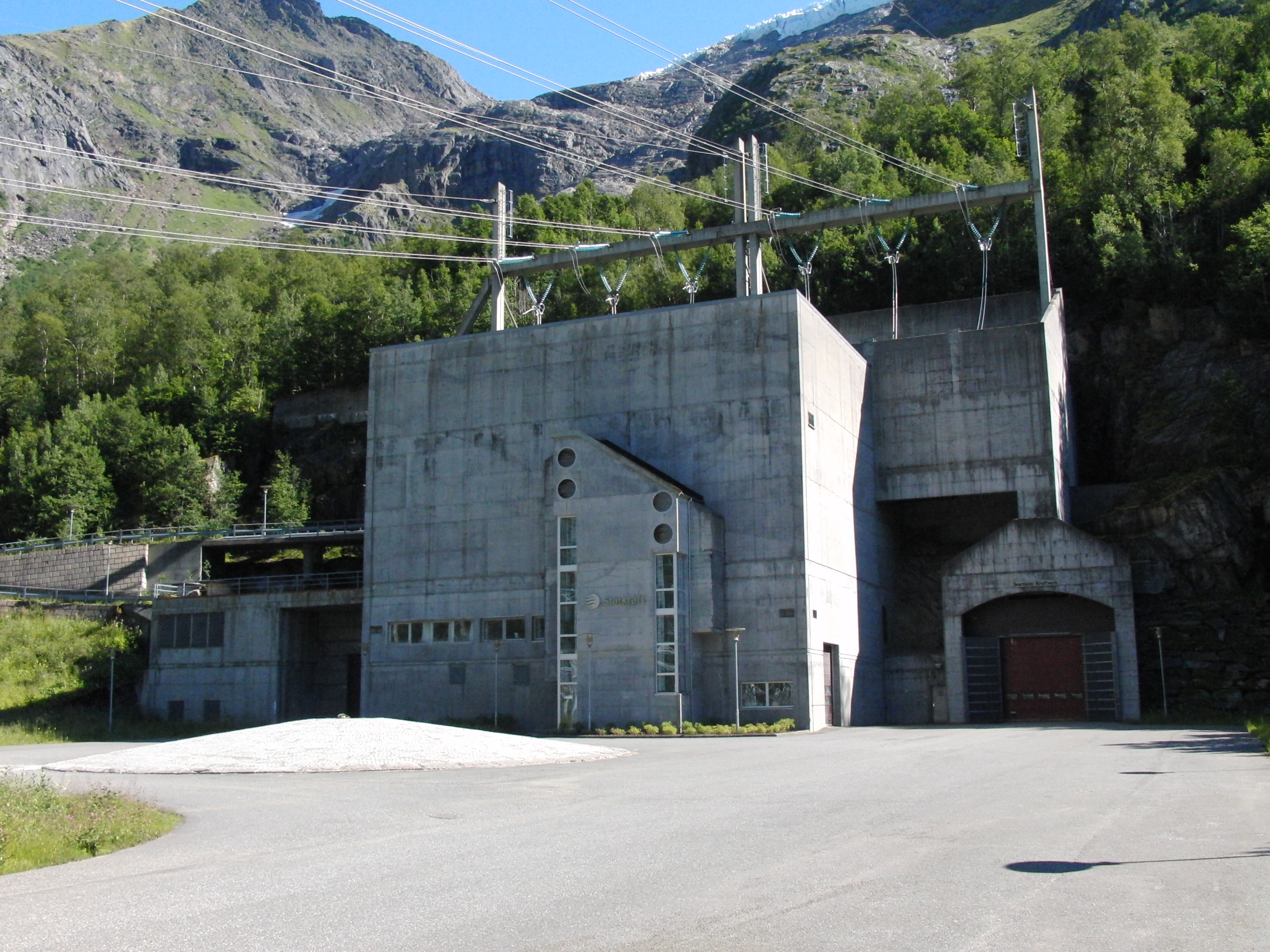
- Entrance to the Svartisen Power Station
- Official name: Svartisen kraftverk
- Country: Norway
- Location: Meløy Municipality
- Coordinates: 66°43′42″N 13°54′49″E
- Status: Operational
- Opening date: 1993; 32 years ago
- Owner: Statkraft

Reservoir
- Creates: Storglomvatnet
- Total capacity: 3.5×10^{9} m^{3} (3.5 km^{3})

Power Station
- Hydraulic head: 543 metres (1,781 ft)
- Turbines: 2
- Installed capacity: 600 MW
- Capacity factor: 41.9%
- Annual generation: 2,200 GW·h
- Website https://enerwe.no/kraftkommune-vannkraft/dette-er-de-storste-vannkraftverkene-i-norge/145890

The Svartisen Power Station is a hydroelectric power station located in Meløy Municipality in Nordland county, Norway. It operates at an installed capacity of 600 MW (800,000 hp), with an average annual production of about 2,400 GWh (8,600 TJ). The station is owned by Statkraft.

== See also ==
- Storglomvatnet
