= Brandåa Hydroelectric Power Station =

Brandåa Power Station
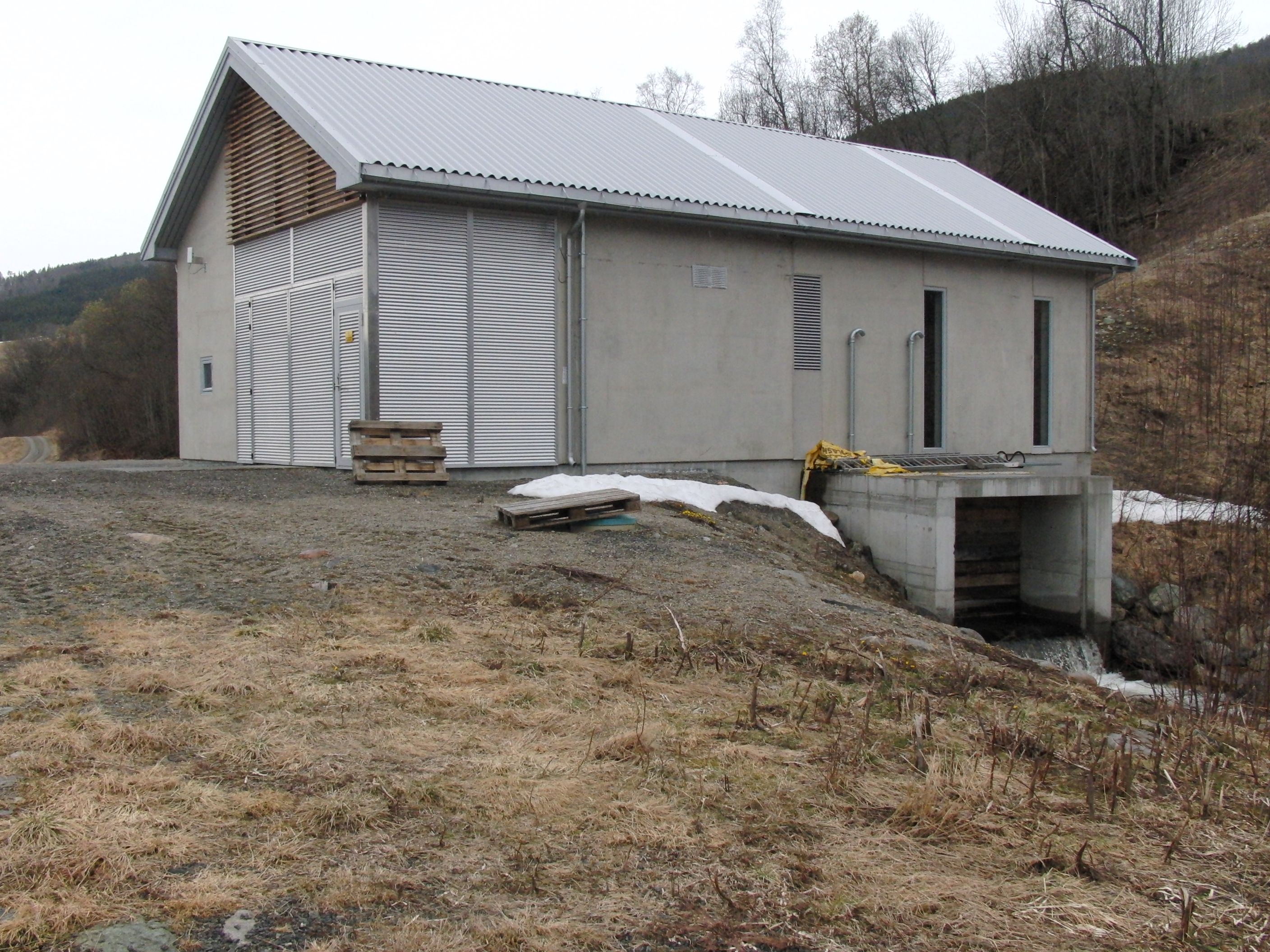
- Official name: Brandåa kraftverk
- Country: Norway
- Location: Rindal Municipality, Trøndelag
- Coordinates: 63°05′32″N 9°13′23″E
- Status: Operational
- Construction began: 2006
- Opening date: 2009; 16 years ago
- Owner: Svorka Produksjon

Power Station
- Hydraulic head: 373 metres (1,224 ft)
- Installed capacity: 4.1 MW
- Capacity factor: 44.0%
- Annual generation: 15.8 GW·h

The Brandåa Hydroelectric Power Station (Norwegian: Brandåa kraftverk) is a hydroelectric power station in Rindal Municipality in Trøndelag county, Norway. It is a run-of-river hydro power station utilizing a drop of 373 meters (1,224 ft) in some tributaries of the Surna River. Permission was granted for construction in 2006 and the plant came into operation in 2009. It is operated by Svorka Produksjon AS. It operates at an installed capacity of 4.1 megawatts (5,500 hp), with an average annual production of about 15.8 gigawatt-hours (57 TJ).
