= Tamishi landing =

1993 naval landing and battle during the War in Abkhazia

- Part of the July Offensive in the War in Abkhazia (1992–1993)
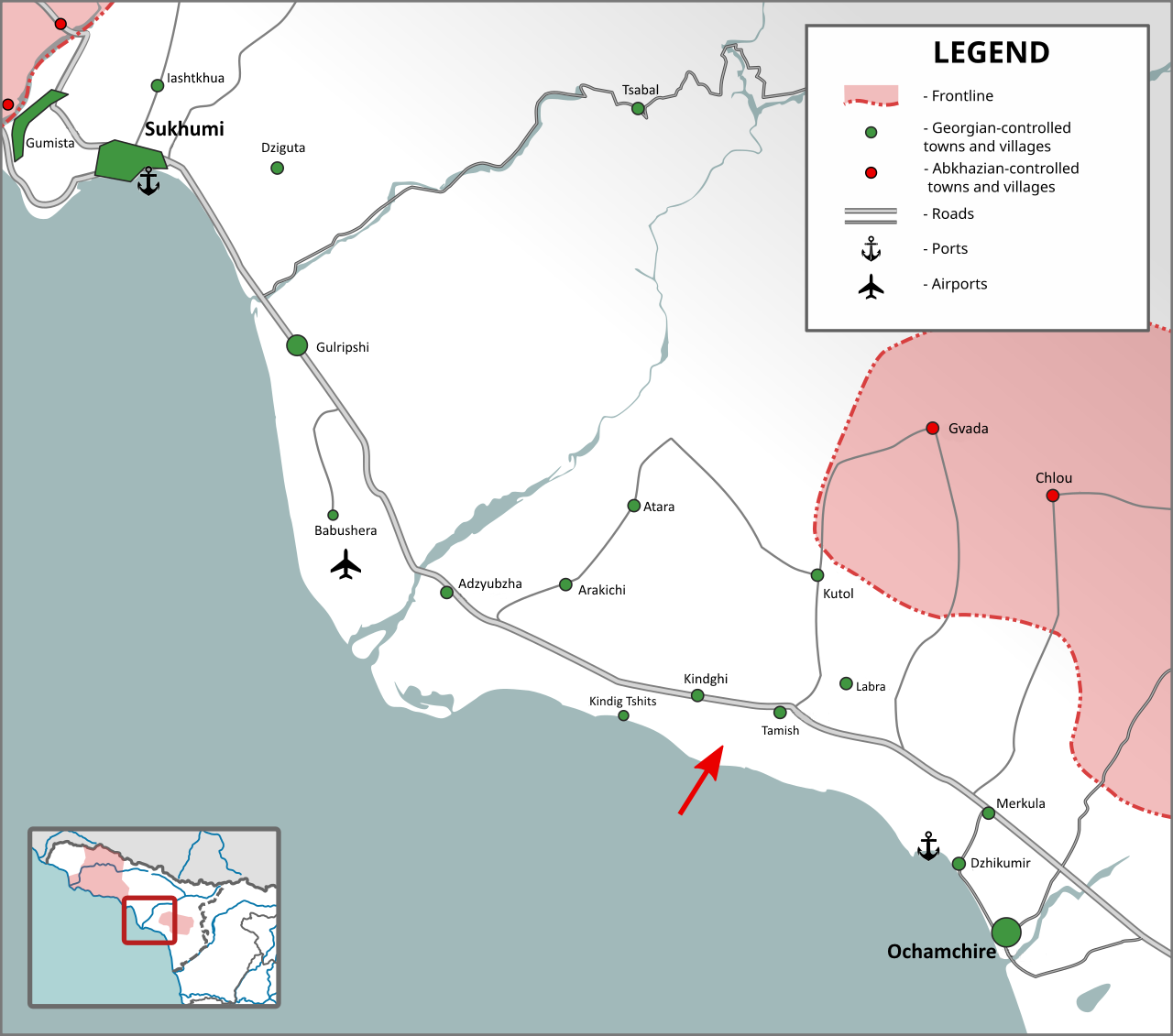
- A map of the landing.
Date	July 2–July 10, 1993
Location	Tamishi, Ochamchira District, Abkhazia 42°47′23″N 41°22′19″E
Result	See Aftermath
Territorial changes	Temporary occupation of Tamishi by Abkhazian forces; subsequent recapture by Georgian forces

Belligerents
Abkhazia; CMPC; Russia	Georgia

Commanders and leaders
(Abkhazia) Zaur Zarandia (Russia) Alexander Lebed (Note: As a troop organizer.)	(Georgia (country)) Guram Nikolaishvili (Georgia (country)) Loti Kobalia (Georgia (country)) Tamaz Nadareishvili (Georgia (country)) Zurab Mamulashvili (POW)

Units involved
Amphibious force Eastern Front units Transnistrian volunteers	11th Army Brigade; 13th "Shavnabada" Light Infantry Battalion; 24th Brigade "Avaza" Dusheti Battalion; Mkhedrioni; Internal Troops; Zviadists

Strength
~300–1,500 landing troops	At least 250

Casualties and losses
Volunteers: 57 killed, 153 wounded, 1 vessel sunk Russian soldiers: ~150 dead Total: Up to 600 dead	250 (Note: Soldiers.)–1,000 (Note: Soldiers and civilians.) killed
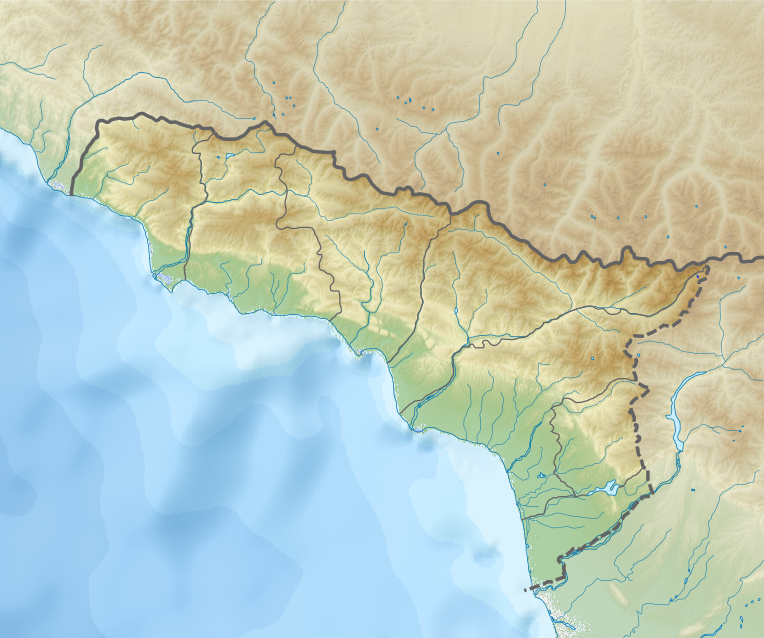
- Location of Tamishi in Abkhazia

The Tamysh or Tamishi landing was a naval landing operation and associated battle from the night of 2nd to 10th July, 1993, during the War in Abkhazia (1992–1993). It was part of the July Offensive.

== Background ==
Following the capture of Gagra in late 1992, the separatist army focused on seizing the capital, Sukhumi, from the Georgian forces. After the failed attempts in January and March 1993, the separatist forces underwent a three-and-a-half-month hiatus to plan a coordinated offensive involving simultaneous attacks across multiple fronts. The Abkhaz strategy involved a naval landing and a commando raid south of Sukhumi to cut off the only road and railway connecting Sukhumi with the rest of Georgia, preventing the flow of reinforcements, to be proceeded by the frontal assault on the Gumista River front, thus engaging Georgians from two sides. Additionally, the operation would involve the offensive on the Eastern Front to link up with and aid the landing force. Tamishi, a village south of Sukhumi in the Ochamchira District, was poorly defended by the Georgian side; the 11th Army Brigade occupied positions toward Sukhumi, while the 24th Brigade was based in Ochamchire, but there were few troops in Tamishi itself due to the anticipated assault from the land rather than the sea.

== Landing force ==
According to Abkhaz public-political figure Aslan Kobakhia, the Tamishi landing force was entirely made up of volunteers. It numbered from 300 to 1,500 men. The force consisted largely of volunteers from the North Caucasus, Crimea, and Moldova (including unrecognized Transnistria). Transnistrian volunteers were heavily involved in the landing.

According to the Georgian lieutenant general Guram Nikolaishvili, the landing force largely consisted of the Russian and Cossack troops, and the Russian soldiers from Crimea and Moldova were heavily involved in the landing. Russian General Alexander Lebed was the one who was tasked with assembling the troops for the landing force, and his brother was commanding the 14th Russian army in Moldova at that time. According to Nikolaishvili, many of these Russian troops were demobilized or on vacation so that the Russian side could claim later that they were fighting in Abkhazia on their own initiative during the transfer of 150 dead bodies of these fighters to Russia.

== Operation ==
=== Initial landing and combat ===
On the night of July 2, 1993, the operation began with a heavy artillery bombardment of Sukhumi and its environs at 06:00 AM, used as cover for the amphibious assault force. The landing force launched from Gudauta using self-propelled barges and small Russian naval craft.

The ships headed toward the village of Tamishi, where Abkhazian troops from the Eastern Front simultaneously breached Georgian defensive lines to reach the coast. Although Georgian forces detected the barges and opened fire with howitzers and Grad rocket launchers—forcing some barges carrying ammunition to retreat—the landing force successfully established a bridgehead.

=== Blockade and counter-attacks ===
The landing force captured a 13-kilometer section of the road-rail link to Sukhumi and blew up key bridges, severing communication lines between Sukhumi and Tbilisi. During this engagement, the Georgian "Avaza" Dusheti Battalion was decisively defeated.

In response, the Georgian leadership concentrated vehicles and artillery near the village of Tsagera. Brigades were assembled from Akhaltsikhe, Kutaisi, and Batumi, and were bolstered by the Mkhedrioni and Zviadists led by Loti Kobalia. On July 7, the Georgian coastal defense reported sinking one of three Abkhaz vessels during a second landing attempt near Tamishi.

=== Diversionary tactics ===
While the Tamishi landing secured the eastern flank, a diversionary tactic was executed on July 4 at 3:00 a.m. in Lower Eshera, where a contingent of Abkhaz fighters crossed the bridge over the Gumista River. This drew Georgian attention away from the primary offensive actions north of Sukhumi.

=== Recapture of the corridor ===
By July 10, Georgian forces managed to defeat the landing force and reclaim the corridor in the Ochamchire district. The separatist troops were either destroyed or withdrew to the Abkhazian-controlled villages. Georgian television subsequently showed reinforcements finally reaching Sukhumi via the reopened road.

== Russian involvement ==
Georgian officials, including the Head of State Eduard Shevardnadze and his military adviser Vladimir Chikovani, alleged that "rogue Russian Army units" and the 14th Russian Army aided the landing force. The claim was rejected by Russian Chief of Staff Mikhail Kolesnikov as a "malicious provocation."

== Aftermath ==
The initial success of the Tamishi landing and the disruption of the Georgian logistics facilitated Abkhazian advances north of Sukhumi, leading to the capture of Kamani, Akhalsheni, and Shroma. However, the Georgian recapture of the road to Sukhumi eventually relieved the pressure on the city after 16 July. Therefore, the battle for Tamishi is either considered as a Georgian success for reopening the roads and averting the fall of Sukhumi in July, or an Abkhaz success for allowing the capture of the strategic heights and villages north of Sukhumi, which laid the groundwork for the successful offensive aimed at the city in September 1993.

== See also ==
- July Offensive (War in Abkhazia)
- Battle of Kamani
