= January Offensive (War in Abkhazia) =

- Part of War in Abkhazia (1992–1993)
Date	5–6 January 1993
Location	Gumista River, Georgia
Result	Georgian victory

Belligerents
Abkhazia	Georgia

Casualties and losses
Abkhaz claim: 37 dead, 100 injured; Georgian claim: 80 dead	Abkhaz claim: 150 dead or wounded Two Grad launchers One tank; Georgian claim: 4 dead

The January Offensive or the Battle of Sokhumi was a battle between Georgia and Abkhazian separatists during the War in Abkhazia. It took place between January 5–6, 1993, alongside the banks of the Gumista River.

== Background ==
Between December 1992 and July 1993, the Abkhazian separatists launched three attempts to take Sokhumi. The Abkhaz strategy revolved around crossing the Gumista River frontally with a flanking attack from the sea. The first of such assaults was launched on 5 January and it set a pattern for two other assaults. This was the first serious attempt by any side to force their way through the Gumista River, which served as a dividing line between Georgian and Abkhazian forces.

== Battle ==
On 5 January, Abkhazs launched an attack on Sokhumi. The battle was fought across the Gumista River. To the south-east, the forces were further divided by the Mount Zegan on the Georgian side, which served as a "tactical prize" for Georgians. The Abkhazian forces attempted to capture the mountain. According to the Abkhaz sources, they did manage to cross the river but then retreated, although per Georgian claims Abkhazians never crossed Gumista. Georgians were initially caught in surprise but managed to regroup and repel the attack. According to the report by Georgian Prime Minister Tengiz Sigua, the frontal attack allowed Abkhazians initially to break through to the village of Achandara, although by 11:00 AM they were beaten and retreating. Georgian artillery fire also prevented Abkhazians from capturing Nizhnyaya Eshera.

On the second day, Abkhazs continued to shell Sokhumi with artillery and mortars, meanwhile, Georgians shelled Gudauta sporadically. The Georgian Defence Ministry also reported using artillery fire to successfully repel a naval invasion by a landing boat with 40 to 50 men.

== Outcome ==
On 6 January, the Abkhaz Defence Ministry admitted that the operation failed. However, years later General of the Abkhaz army Sultan Sosnaliev called the January Offensive "dress rehearsal for the victorious offensives in July and September", emphasizing the combat experience. Abkhaz historian Aslan Avidzba also noted that the offensive helped to pull away Georgian forces which were conducting large-scale operation in the Eastern Abkhazia.

== See also ==
- Battle of Sukhumi (1992)
- March Offensive (1993)
- July Offensive (War in Abkhazia)
- Battle of Sukhumi (September 1993)
