= July Offensive (War in Abkhazia) =

1993 war in Abkhazia

- Part of the War in Abkhazia (1992–1993)
| Date | 1–27 July 1993 |
| Location | Sukhumi and Ochamchire Districts |
| Result | See Aftermath |
| Territorial changes | Abkhazians (Note: And their allies) capture strategic heights north of Sukhumi (Shroma, Guma, Akhalsheni, etc.) |

Belligerents
| Abkhazia; CMPC; Russia | Georgia |

Commanders and leaders
| Zaur Zarandia (Note: As commander of the volunteers at the Tamysh landing) | (Georgia (country)) Giorgi Karkarashvili (Georgia (country)) Loti Kobalia (Georgia (country)) Tamaz Nadareishvili (Georgia (country)) Zurab Mamulashvili (POW) |

Strength
| In the Tamysh landing: 300–1,500 landing troops | Participating Georgian Units: 11th Brigade; 24th Brigade; Shavnabada battalion; Internal Troops; Mkhedrioni; Zviadists; Other units |

Casualties and losses
| Heavy: At least 57 killed and 153 wounded, up to 600 dead | Heavy: 250–1,000+ killed |

The July Offensive or the July Operation was an offensive by the Abkhaz separatists in July 1993 against the Georgian armed forces during the War in Abkhazia.

== Background ==
As a result of fighting in 1992, the Gumista River emerged as a stable front line where the conflict between the Abkhaz separatists and Georgia was at a stalemate. In addition, in Eastern Abkhazia, the surroundings of the town of Tkvarcheli which were held by separatists and besieged by Georgian forces formed another front line.

From December 1992 to July 1993, the Abkhaz separatists launched three attempts to take Georgian-held Sukhumi, the capital of the province. First two of these attempts proved to be unsuccessful. The Abkhaz goal was to isolate the Georgian garrison in Sukhumi. This could have been achieved with a flanking maneuver through the mountainous area, but it was almost impossible due to rough terrain and a lack of raods. The alternative was to make the commando raid south of Sukhumi and cut the only road and railway connecting Sukhumi with the rest of Georgia, preventing the flow of reinforcements. Thus, the Abkhaz strategy revolved around frontal assault on the Gumista River front with a flanking attack from the sea in the Georgian rear, thus engaging Georgians from two sides.

Prior to the offensive, the separatists managed to assemble small but maneuverable navy, which gained combat experience in operations by motorboats with Grad multiple rocket launchers installed on them to bomb Georgian positions in Sukhumi. Moreover, they had improved reconnaissance.

== Offensive ==
=== Tamishi landing ===
On 1 July, the separatists launched artillery bombardment of Sukhumi and its environs, which was used as a cover by the amphibious assault force to commence the naval landing. The bombardment intensified at 06:00 AM on 2 July when 100 shells were fired. At 08:00 AM, the bombardment of Gulripshi began. According to the Georgian Defence Ministry, 200 shells fired from howitzers and multiple-launch Grad missiles exploded in Sukhumi, killing 12 people, wounding 65 and destroying 30 buildings.

The landing was launched from Gudauta with self-propelled barges. The small Russian naval craft was also used in the landing. The ships headed towards the village of Tamishi (Tamysh) in Ochamchire District, where the Eastern Front was approaching the sea. The Abkhaz troops on Eastern Front launched a simultaneous push, breached Georgian defensive lines and reached the coast, providing the landing zone for the amphibious assault force. However, the Georgians detected the barges and opened fire from howitzers and Grad rocket launchers, causing the barges to retreat to the sea with the large amount of ammunition. The Georgians had Tamishi poorly defended, with the 11th Army Brigade occupying positions left to it, to the direction of Sukhumi, while the 24th Brigade was basing in Ochamchire, expecting assaults mainly from the land rather from sea. The separatist troops captured the section of the road-rail link to Sukhumi and occupied a 13-kilometer-long corridor on the Sukhumi-Ochamchira Highway. The landing force managed to hold the bridgehead even with small amount of ammunition and blew up the bridges on the road to Sukhumi, severing the rail and highway lines of communications between Sukhumi and the rest of Georgia.

The Georgians concentrated vehicles and artillery near the village of Tsagera to reclaim the territory since the roads were of paramount importance for supplying Sukhumi. The 11th Brigade, 24th Brigade, "Avaza" and parts of "Shavnabada" battalion all took part in the battle of Tamishi. Expecting main assault on the Gumista River front, Georgians were unable to pull forces from there, instead, they assembled brigades from Akhaltsikhe, Kutaisi, and Batumi. Moreover, the government troops received further boost from the supporters of ousted president Zviad Gamsakhurdia, with Loti Kobalia arriving to Ochamchire with 300-350 troops, as well as Mkhedrioni and Internal Troops.

According to Abkhaz public-political figure Aslan Kobakhia, the Tamysh landing force was entirely made up of volunteers. Its number had been estimated from 300 to 1,500 men. Transnistrian volunteers were heavily involved in the landing. According to the Georgian lieutenant general Guram Nikolaishvili, the landing force consisted of Russians, Cossacks, and especially troops from Crimea and Moldova. Russian General Alexander Lebed was the one who was tasked with assembling the troops for the landing force, and his brother was commanding 14th Russian army in Moldova at that time. According to Nikolaishvili, many of these Russian troops were demobilized or on vacation so that the Russian side could claim later that they were fighting in Abkhazia on their own initiative during the transfer of 150 dead bodies of these fighters to Russia.

On 2 July, Eduard Shevardnadze received emergency powers from the Parliament of Georgia. After that, Shevardnadze flew to Sukhumi. On 4 July, Shevardnadze survived a shell which hit the nearby Georgian tank while Shevardnadze was being driven to meet the Georgian troops in Shroma.

On 10 July, Georgians managed to reclaim the Abkhaz-held corridor in the Ochamchire district. The Abkhaz landing force was destroyed, resulting in 100 to 600 deaths for the separatists and the loss of two tanks and several armored personnel carriers. The Georgian television showed the reinforcements and volunteers going to Sukhumi through the reopened road. The Georgians continued to conduct mopping-up operations of separatists holed up in villages and forests. The battle for Shroma, a strategic hill 10 miles north of Sukhumi, also continued. Georgians reported losing 250 men in the battle for Tamishi.

=== Shroma, Guma, and Akhalsheni ===
After the landing, the separatists launched attack on the Gumista Front. On 4 July, they conducted a diversionary attack on the Georgian positions in Lower Eshera, but the main events took place on the northern part of the front. On 5 July, the separatists launched five successive assaults on the Gumista front north of Sukhumi with artillery and air support near Shroma and Akhalsheni villages. One Georgian SU-25 and two Abkhaz helicopters were shot down. In the following days, the separatists captured Guma, Akhalsheni, and Kaman, along with the Sukhum Hydroelectric Power Station.

The Georgians attempted to retake the corridor in Ochamchire District where the Abkhaz side managed to surround the Georgian troops by 6 July and seize three tanks, three infantry fighting vehicles, two mortars and 80 firearms. On the other hand, the Georgian side reported repelling another naval landing of Abkhaz and North Caucasian commandos near Tamishi on 7 July, with the Georgian coastal defence units engaging the three Abkhaz vessels and sinking one of them.

On 7 July, Eduard Shevardnadze declared martial law in Abkhazia. More than 1,000 Georgian soldiers and civilians had been reported killed since the beginning of the offensive. Shroma and Akhalsheni were described as "completely destroyed" as a result of fighting. According to the Georgian side, the separatist troops reached thr suburb of Negnia Mosti in Sukhumi but were pushed back by the Georgians.

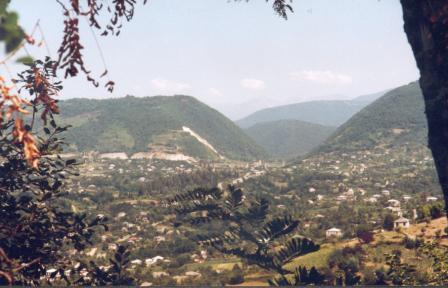
Shroma, a site of the Abkhazian offensive

On 9 July, separatists captured Shroma. Also on 9 July, Shevardnadze narrowly survived another shell fired by the separatists which hit his villa where he was staying.

Even with the Georgian control of the roads, the separatists continued to sabotage its restoration efforts through surprise attacks. On 13 July, the Abkhaz Defence Ministry claimed that road's carrying capacity was "insignificant" and that Sukhumi was still without electricity.

On 16 July, Georgians launched a major counteroffensive against separatists after they rejected an ultimatum to pull back from two villages.

== Ceasefire ==
Russian Deputy Foreign Minister Boris Pastukhov met Vladislav Ardzinba in Gudauta on 14 July, and then Eduard Shevardnadze in Tbilisi on 15 July. The topic of the meetings was a proposed ceasefire agreement. Pastukhov presented the Abkhaz demands to the Georgian side: withdrawal of Georgian forces from Abkhazia, the deployment of Russian peacekeeping troops and snap elections for a new regional parliament with a guaranteed ethnic quota for Abkhazs. Eduard Shevardnadze instead suggested mutual demilitarization. Jaba Ioseliani, the Mkhedrioni paramilitary leader, rejected Abkhaz demands and suggested that the Abkhazs, having failed to capture Sukhumi through military means, were using Russian diplomatic pressure to achieve same goal.

On 27 July 1993, Georgia and Abkhaz separatists signed a Russian-brokered ceasefire agreement. The agreement banned the use of aircraft, artillery and naval vessels in the conflict zone as well as prohibiting the introduction of new troops or ammunition into Abkhazia. Russia was a guarantor of ceasefire and on 29 July Russian troops arrived to Abkhazia to separate sides, being stationed in and around Georgian-held Sukhumi. The Georgian troops were to withdraw from Abkhazia per arranged timetable. The Confederation of Mountain Peoples of the Caucasus was also ordered to withdraw from Abkhazia. Although Shevardnadze supported the agreement, describing ending the conflict as "victory", the Georgian lawmakers criticized it but still gave powers to Shevardnadze to sign it. The United Nations observers were tasked with overseeing the immediate truce and the gradual demilitarization.

== Russian involvement ==
The offensive led to the worsening of the Georgia–Russia relations which had improved in May 1993 after the Shevardnadze-Yeltsin summit in Moscow and the signing of previous failed ceasefire agreement. Eduard Shevardnadze wrote a letter to the United Nations Secretary-General Boutros Boutros-Ghali, stating "a blatant aggression against a sovereign state is being conducted by Abkhazian separatists and Russian mercenaries". The Georgian officials alleged that the "rogue Russian Army units" were aiding the separatists, with the Russian jet fighters and helicopters being shot in the battle zone. Moreover, they alleged that Russia was not doing enough to stop the flow of the troops of Confederation of Mountain Peoples of the Caucasus from the Russian North Caucasus to Abkhazia. Shevardnadze's military adviser Vladimir Chikovani alleged that 14th Russian army aided the Abkhaz landing force, a claim rejected by Russian Chief of Staff Mikhail Kolesnikov as "a deliberate and malicious provocation". Georgian prime minister Tengiz Sigua demanded that Russia ended the "undeclared war" against Georgia and argued for breaking off diplomatic relations with Russia, which was rejected by Shevardnadze. Jaba Ioseliani, the Mkhedrioni paramilitary leader, threatened that if Sukhumi fell, his militia would declare partisan war against Russia and attack Russian military bases. The Georgian claims about Russian participation were rejected by Russian Foreign Minister Andrei Kozyrev, who said that Russia would put economic sanctions on both sides if they refused to sign a Russian-brokered ceasefire agreement which recognized "Abkhazian autonomy within the territorial integrity of Georgia".

On 18 July Moskovskiye Novosti published an interview of former Russian officer who said that he was fighting as a mercenary for the separatists along with Afghan War veterans and Cossacks. He stated that the Russian Defence Ministry statements on neutrality were "largely for public consumption" and that the Abkhaz success was due to advices by Russian officers, claiming that many in the Russian General Staff favored the Abkhaz side. He also described the relations with Abkhazs as "brotherly".

== Aftermath ==
There are different views on the outcomes of the offensive. Some sources describe the offensive as having failed to achieve its objectives. According to the Georgian sources, the main aim of the separatists was to capture Sukhumi, which was averted by successful Georgian push to reclaim Tamishi and reopen the road to the city. According to Krasnaya Zvezda correspondent Nikolay Astashkin, unlike the previous offensives, this time the goal of the separatists was not to seize Sukhumi through a frontal assault but to capture the heights in the northern outskirts of city to prepare for future offensives. They emphasized capturing the village of Shroma in particular, which was described as "Sukhumi's northern gates". After this, the separatists did not attempt to capture Sukhumi because of them not being prepared yet for urban warfare. Instead, they attempted to advance towards Gulripshi and fully encircle Sukhumi, or to the village of Babushar to capture the military airfield of Georgians. They had two tasks during the second phase of the offensive: to cut off Georgian troops in Sukhumi and rescue a landing force near Ochamchire.

According to the separatist sources, the offensive laid the groundwork for the September offensive and its success forced the Georgian side to sign the disadvantageous ceasefire agreement on 27 July under the threat of losing Sukhumi. However, according to Georgian analyst Paata Zakareishvili, Shevardnadze signed the agreement because he genuinely trusted Russian president Boris Yeltsin who might have indeed supported Shevardnadze and the efforts to regulate the conflict although this was being sabotaged by the Russian military, security forces and parliament which were not obeying Yeltsin.

On 16 September, the Abkhaz separatists launched another offensive against the understrengthened Georgian forces in Sukhumi despite the ceasefire agreement. It resulted in the capture of Sukhumi by separatists and the end of war in Georgian defeat.
