= Tamish =

Tamish may refer to:

- Tamish, Georgia, village in Abkhazia, Georgia
- Tamish River, river in Serbia
