= Fall of Sukhumi =

1993 battle of the Abkhazia war

- Part of the War in Abkhazia
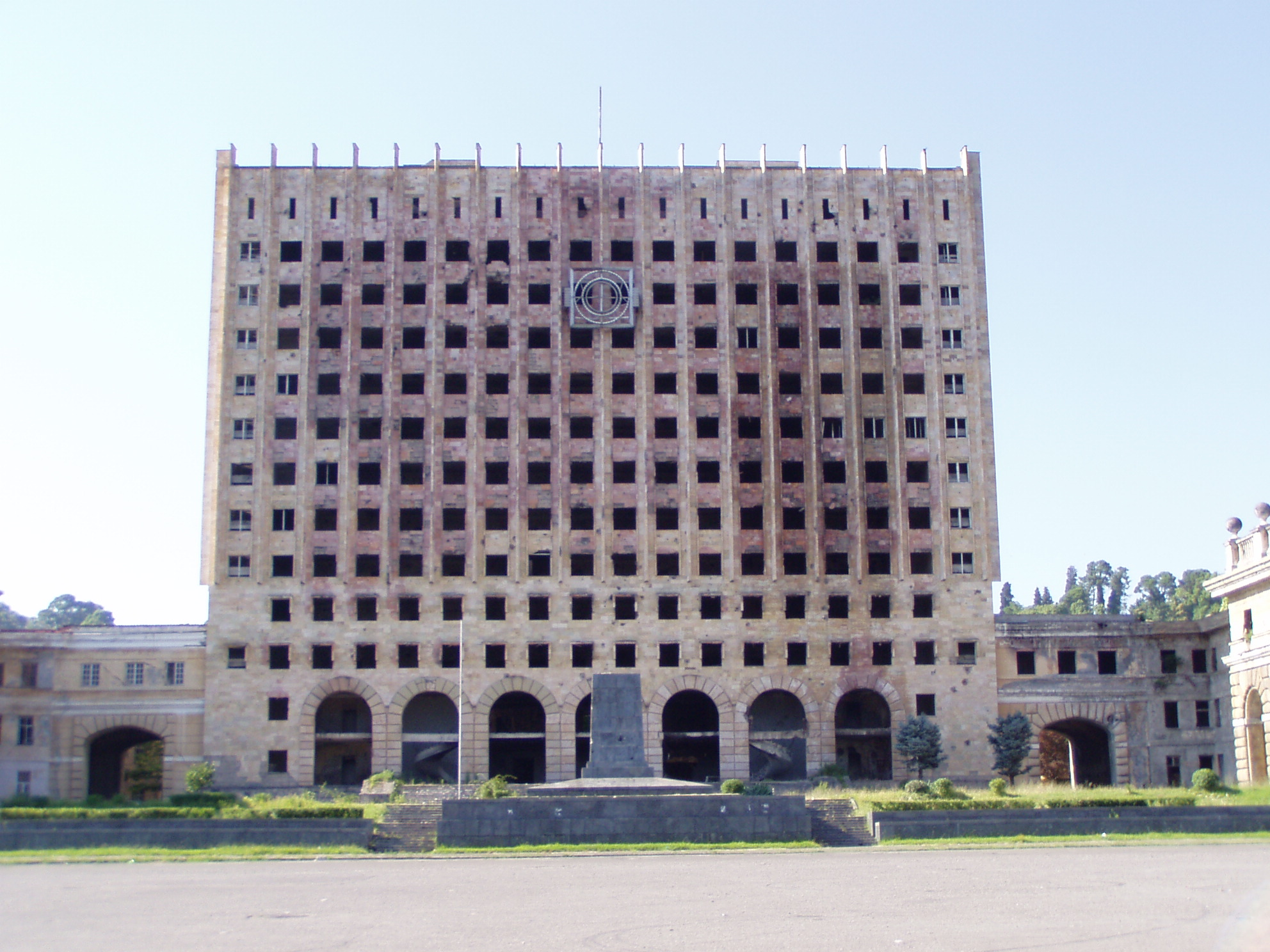
- Destroyed building of the Supreme Council of Abkhazia
Date	16–27 September 1993
Location	Sukhumi, Abkhazia, Georgia
Result	Abkhazian victory: Ethnic cleansing of Georgians in Sukhumi

Belligerents
Abkhazia; CMPC; Russia	Georgia

Commanders and leaders
Sultan Sosnaliyev; Sergei Dbar; Valeriy Hubulov; Shamil Basayev; Sergei Matosyan (WIA)	Eduard Shevardnadze; Zhiuli Shartava †; Giorgi Karkarashvili; Geno Adamia †

Units involved
5 battalions Gagra garrison 2 motorized rifle brigades 345th Independent Guards Airborne Regiment; Bagramyan Battalion; Kuban Cossack Military Society	23rd mechanized brigade 24th mechanized brigade Internal Troops of Georgia; Mkhedrioni

Strength
At least 4,000 soldiers	At least 4,000-5,000 soldiers

Casualties and losses
Unknown	~500 soldiers killed, 2,000 wounded
- 1 US journalist killed

The Fall of Sukhumi or the Siege of Sukhumi occurred from 16 to 27 September 1993, involving the Abkhaz separatists, along with their Russian and North Caucasian backers, and Georgia, being the last engagement of the War in Abkhazia.

The battle began on 16 September, when the separatists, aided by the local Russian military base, launched their offensive on Sukhumi, the capital city of the region, amidst the escalation of the Georgian Civil War. Georgians, having withdrawn most of their military equipment from the city following the ceasefire agreement, which was supposed to put an end to the military conflict, were caught by surprise, outgunned and outnumbered, which allowed the separatists to effectively encircle and besiege the city, cutting its vital communication lines with the rest of Georgia. Although the warring sides in the Georgian Civil War made a deal to unify their forces to break the siege, they were still unable to coordinate effectively and on time, and thus on 27 September, the city fell to the separatists. The disorganized Georgian forces were unable to mount a proper defence and chaotically retreated, which resulted in the separatists capturing most of the region by 30 September, thus ending the 13-month long war.

Following the battle, the Abkhazian troops, having established their control over Sukhumi, committed numerous massacres and other atrocities against the local population, which forced most of the Georgian residents to flee the city, although as the most were unable to escape through the blockaded coastal road, they had to flee through the Caucasus Mountains through the blizzard, which led to starvation, freezing and death of many. Thus, tens of thousands were violently displaced from the city and even more from the entire region.

== Background ==
=== July ceasefire ===
Sukhumi was a Georgian-majority (42%) city and the capital of Georgia's Abkhazian Autonomous Republic, which was an epicenter of the 12-month long war between the Georgian government forces and Abkhaz separatists, who were based in the city of Gudauta as they received the support of the local Russian military base there. During the July offensive, the Georgian-held Sukhumi became a center of fighting as the separatists attempted to capture the city from the direction of Gudauta. On 27 July 1993, Georgia and Abkhaz separatists signed a Russian-brokered ceasefire agreement in Sochi to end the 12-month long conflict. It entailed the gradual demilitarisation of the conflict zone. The agreement banned the use of aircraft, artillery and naval vessels in the conflict zone as well as prohibiting the introduction of new troops or ammunition into Abkhazia. The separatist military formations were obliged to disarm and dissolve. Georgia withdrew most of its troops and heavy artillery from the region as per agreement, leaving only a small contingent. Russia was a guarantor of ceasefire and on 29 July Russian troops arrived to Abkhazia to separate sides, being stationed in and around Georgian-held Sukhumi. Many displaced civilians returned to Sukhumi, and all schools were re-opened on September 1. The normal life resumed in the city. The civilians were asked to return by the Georgian leader Eduard Shevardnadze.

=== Georgian Civil War ===
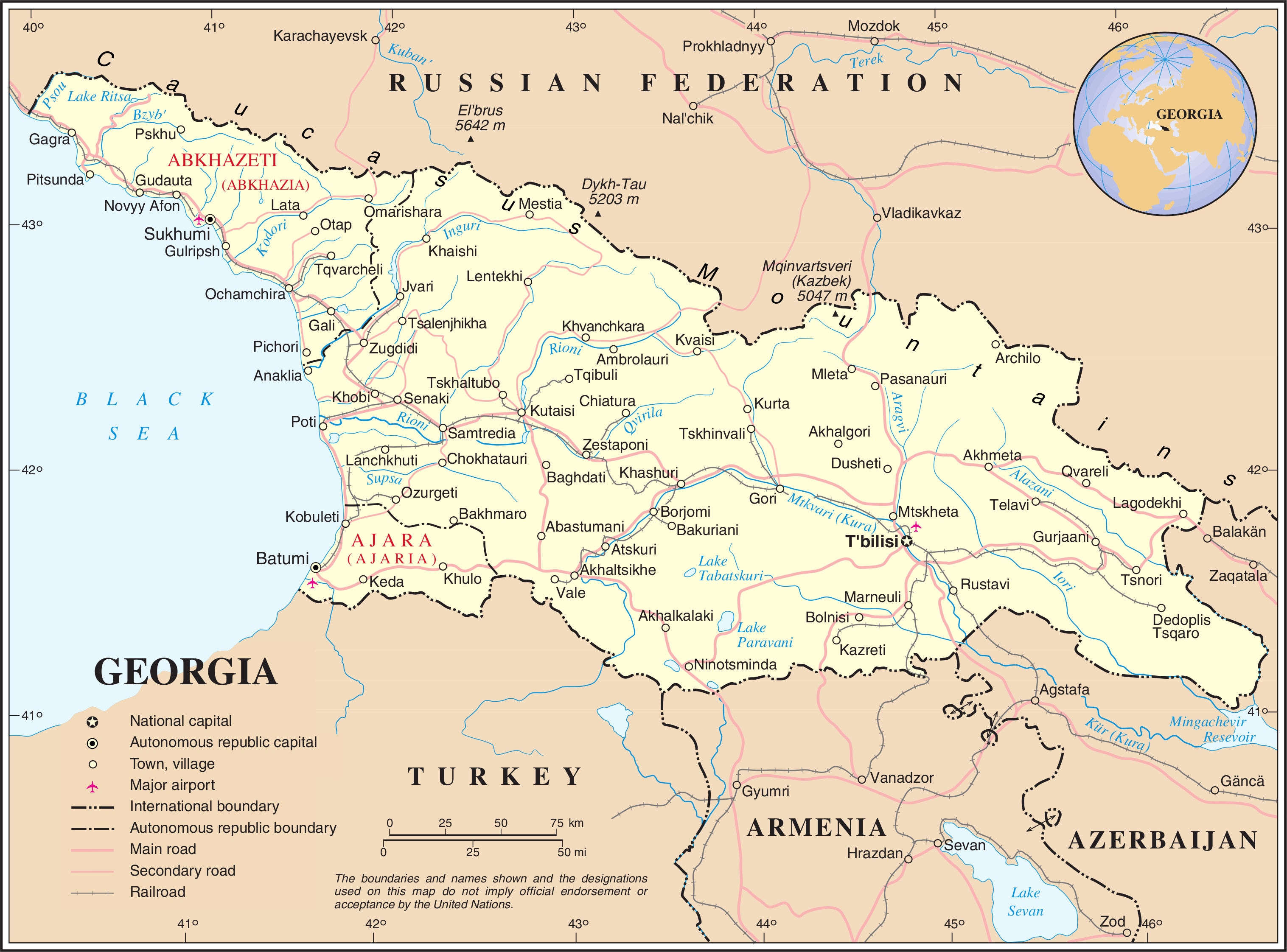
Map of Georgia

The failure of Eduard Shevardnadze to regulate the conflict in Abkhazia strengthened the popularity of the former President Zviad Gamsakhurdia. Several battalions in Sukhumi and Gali declared that they were withdrawing their allegiance from Shevardnadze and joining Gamsakhurdia's forces after the "shameful" ceasefire agreement signed by Shevardnadze, which provided for withdrawal of Georgian armed forces from Abkhazia. This led to the intensification of the Georgian Civil War, which had been fought since December 1991 military coup between the forces of the ousted Georgian President Zviad Gamsakhurdia and the post-coup government of Eduard Shevardnadze. On 25 August 1993, the Gamsakhurdia's forces used a transmitter to cut into a television broadcast to urge an uprising against Eduard Shevardnadze. On 28 August, the troops of Loti Kobalia, the commander of Gamsakhurdia's forces during his exile to Chechnya, advanced from their base in Zugdidi and captured three towns in Mingrelia (western Georgia): Abasha, Khobi and Senaki. Shevardnadze responded by massing his troops to stop Gamsakhurdia's forces from further advance. They braced near seaport Poti. Shevardnadze issued an appeal to Gamsakhurdia's forces, telling them to surrend or face "grave consequences". On 7 September, Kobalia's troops advanced into Abkhazia and captured the town of Gali, which was controlled by the Shevardnadze's forces. On 9 September, negotiations began between Gamsakhurdia loyalists and Shevardnadze's government in Batumi. Shevardnadze's government, represented by a delegation led by Green Party leader Zurab Zhvania, offered to open talks on a new constitution for the republic, to be followed by a referendum and new elections, while Gamsakhurdia loyalists argued for a recognition of Zviad Gamsakhurdia as a legitimate ruler of Georgia alongside Shevardnadze's existing administration. The talks ultimately broke down on 11 September and Shevardnadze announced his plan to introduce a state of emergency in Georgia.

On 13 September, Shevardnadze proposed a state of emergency to the Parliament of Georgia and its resignation for three months. Shevardnadze issued his program, proposing banning rallies, curtailing all political activity, and censoring mass media. In response, MP Jaba Ioseliani, the leader of the Mkhedrioni paramilitary and one of Shevardnadze's allies, charged him with attempting to establish "a dictatorship by Communist methods". On 14 September, Eduard Shevardnadze abruptly resigned, which was followed by a rally in his support in Tbilisi. The Parliament then decided to approve his request on state of emergency, but to put off a decision on its own dissolution, which Shevardnadze had cited as a precondition for him to get back to his position. Shevardnadze was personally endorsed by the patriarch of Georgian Orthodox Church, Illia II.

Shortly after midnight, taking advantage of disarray in Tbilisi, Loti Kobalia's troops attacked the government troops. On 15 September, the fighting concentrated on the railroad-highway intersection near the village of Japana. Shevardnadze flew to the Western Georgia. He told his opponents not to continue attack, saying: "Do you really think we have no force?". He told the Georgian parliament that his troops were ready to counterattack. The Georgian parliament ultimately decided to accept Shevardnadze's proposal to dissolve itself, and from 20 September the Emergency Council of 5 was set to take control of the affairs in the country.

== Battle ==
=== Beginning of the offensive ===
On 16 September, the Abkhaz separatists broke the 27 July agreement and launched an offensive on Sukhumi. They launched a landing of an amphibious force in the Ochamchira district, to the south of Sukhumi, cutting down Georgian communication lines (the only highway and railway line connecting the city with the rest of Georgia) and besieging the city. The assault on Sukhumi followed from the north, the direction of "Gumista front". Separatists had a considerable advantage in firepower because Georgia had removed its heavy artillery from Abkhazia in August. The separatist troops were equipped with heavy artillery, mobile rocket launchers, heat-seeking missiles, heavy machine-guns, grenade launchers and anti-tank weapons, while Georgians were mostly armed with assault rifles.

On 17 September, Eduard Shevardnadze issued an appeal to Russian President Boris Yeltsin, saying that he was trying "to defend the city with naked hands". At least five civilians were reportedly killed in the fighting as Abkhazian tanks entered Sukhumi. Shevardnadze arrived to the city and went on the television saying: "I appeal to all men with guns to go to defend Sukhumi". Reports indicated that Gamsakhurdia loyalists joined the government forces to fight separatists. The United Nations Security Council issued a statement, calling separatists to fulfill their commitment to the cease-fire and resume the UN-endorsed peace process. US President Bill Clinton sent letters to Russian President Boris Yeltsin and Georgian leader Eduard Shevardnadze to express his "strong support for Shevardnadze's efforts bring peace to Georgia". The letter also noted American support for Georgian territorial integrity and condemnation of the military offensive.

On the same day a confidential meeting was held between Georgian leader Eduard Shevardnadze and Russian Minister of Defence Pavel Grachev in Adler. Grachev proposed to station 2 Russian divisions in Sukhumi to secure peace, although the Georgian side refused. The Georgian Minister of Defence Gia Karkarashvili and the head of Informational-Intelligence Departament Irakli Batiashvili went categorically against such arrangement, and Shevardnadze agreed with them that the introduction of Russian divisions to Sukhumi would have meant "occupation of the city by Russia".

=== Ceasefire talks ===
On 19 September, late at night, Itar-Tass reported that a ceasefire agreement was reached in Sochi between Abkhazian representatives, Russia and Georgia. It called for warring sides to pull out from Sukhumi within 24 hours, lift blockade of supplies and continue a mutually agreed withdrawal. However, later Itar-Tass reported that no agreement was reached and negotiations would continue next day. Earlier that day fierce fighting was reported in the city. Abkhazian separatists fired artillery shells into Sukhumi. Shevardnadze appealed for international help and Russia promised to cut trade, electricity and arms traffic flowing from Russia to Abkhazia. Russian Prime Minister Viktor Chernomyrdin said on 19 September that Russia would refuse to grant Abkhazia special trade terms and financial credits. He also said that Russian costume officers and troops would monitor efforts to prevent weapons to be transferred from southern Russia into Abkhazia.

On 20 September, a heavy fighting continued in Sukhumi. Russian Defence Minister Pavel Grachev returned to Moscow from Abkhazia and said that the introduction of a peacekeeping force would be impossible because of heavy fighting. Grachev said that Shevardnadze agreed on sending Russian peacekeeping force to Abkhazia, despite earlier describing it as an "occupation". An attempt to renegotiate a ceasefire broke down. A campaign began in Georgia to donate jewelry and money for the gun-buying campaign. The state of emergency came into effect. Before that, a demonstration was held in Georgia, appealing to Russia to intervene and uphold Russian-brokered ceasefire. Russian Defense Minister Pavel Grachev said that both parties were to blame and urged Georgia to withdraw from Abkhazia as per ceasefire plan. Separatists called on Georgia to surrender Sukhumi, saying that further resistance was "useless". Abkhazian spokeswoman said they had captured Sukhumi's northern and western suburbs. Shevardnadze had called Yeltsin to intervene, but he did not take a call, according to Shevardnadze’s adviser Levan Mikeladze. In a bloody house-to-house battle, Georgian troops beat back separatists. Georgia's Abkhazian governor Zhiuli Shartava said that the city was shelled from land and sea and sustained heavy damage. Early on 20 September, Shevardnadze made a deal with Gamsakhurdia loyalists to come to aid the defense of Sukhumi, although they reportedly were unable to break through.

Shevardnadze's appeal to the world read:

Now, when the actions of the anti-people forces have joined in a single stream even in Georgia, the "spontaneous" undermining of the Sochi agreement, as they say in Gudauta, and the actions of some of the highest-ranking Russian military officials and the policy of the Russian parliament gives us the right to assert that we are dealing with a well-coordinated and synchronized joint attack. I want the world to know: Abkhazia is the battlefield of the empire's bloody revenge, it is "the second August", the gunpowder barrel with which they want to blow up not only Shevardnadze's Georgia, but also Yeltsin's Russia. On September 3, 1992, we signed the summary document in Moscow. Before the ink had dried on the paper, this document was trampled with the boots of the mercenaries who stormed the unarmed Gagra. On May 14, 1993, we agreed on a ceasefire, but Sukhumi again became the object of attack, both from the land, sea and air, and in Ochamchire region, the landing forces armed from head to toe were dispatched, and the city [Sukhumi] was blockaded. Finally, we trusted the Russian peacekeeping mission, its role as a guarantor and mediator, on July 27, 1993, we made an agreement and received betrayal again... cannons still fired and the militants, who were supposed to be disarmed, attacked, and we only have to say that the guarantor of the ceasefire was either unwilling or unable to be a guarantor. A constructive negotiation in itself was disavowed by the statements of some subordinates of the Russian Defense Minister and the decision of the Russian Parliament. So far, the resolution of the UN Security Council has not brought any positive results. And yet, I appeal again to Boris Nikolayevich Yeltsin, the United Nations Security Council and Mr. Boutros Gali, the entire progressive democratic Russia, the entire world community: do not allow a terrible crime, stop the punishment of a small country, save my people from being burned at the stake of imperial reaction.

=== Airliner attacks ===
On 21 September, a Georgian passenger plane was shot down in Sukhumi with a heat-seeking missile fired from a boat. A Tupolev Tu-134 was carrying a number of journalists trying to cover the events. It was flying from Sochi to Sukhumi. The meeting was supposed to be held in Sochi, although Georgian officials did not attend it. Shevardnadze described the shooting as "barbarism". Separatists claimed to control the city's television tower, but Shevardnadze managed to deliver several televised appeals from his bunker in an administrative building of Sukhumi. The shelling of Sukhumi increased. Sukhumi had been without running water and electricity for five days after the beginning of the siege. The electricity was cut off by Russia. The only place to receive electricity was government headquarters in Sukhumi through a generator. Abkhazians claimed they had advanced to within 500 yards of the sea in Sukhumi, although Georgian Defence Ministry spokesman said they repelled separatist attempts to break through city defences.

On 22 September, another plane, carrying relief supplies, was shot down, killing 80 people. The Tupolev Tu-154 exploded while landing in Sukhumi.

On 23 September, a third plane was shot down in Sukhumi. Refugees were boarding the plane to leave the city when the attack happened. However, Shevardnadze said that he was optimistic because he had information that reinforcements were to arrive in few hours. It was suspected that Russian military in Gudauta had supplied the weapons to Abkhaz separatists.

On early 24 September, joint Georgian forces broke through the Abkhazian lines and entered Sukhumi, according to Georgian television. Shevardnadze urged "everyone with a gun" to come to defend Sukhumi. Gamsakhurdia returned to Georgia from Chechnya, landing in Senaki. He went to Zugdidi and told his supporters on a rally to go to help defenders of Sukhumi. Russia's Deputy Foreign Minister Boris Pastukhov blamed separatists for renewing the fighting, describing the shelling of passenger airlines as "barbarous actions which it is impossible to justify". Pastukhov also blamed Russia and the United Nations for failing to send peacekeeping troops to Abkhazia before the renewal of fighting. At dawn, separatists punctured through the outer city defenses, ending a two-day stall in assault.

=== Fall of the city ===
On 25 September, Abkhazians reached the city center. The Russians sent two boats - backed by gunboats and air support - at Georgia's request to pick up Georgian and Russian refugees as the air evacuation was stopped following attacks on airplanes. The boats arrived to Gulripshi, a small port between Sukhumi and its airport. Panick was raging in Sukhumi, including among some troops. The United States condemned Abkhazian offensive and reiterated support for Shevardnadze. 3,300 people were evacuated to Poti from Sokhumi by Russian ships, 6,000 were awating evacuation. Intense fighting continued. Around 500 Gamsakhurdia loyalists were on their way to Sukhumi, but they were bogged down in a fight with a separatist force in Akhaldaba. Gamsakhurdia said that he would support Shevardnadze's forces in the fight against separatists for the sake of the nation, but also said that he would not relinquish his claim on power and called Shevardnadze to resign and hand over power to a legitimate government.

On 26 September, Abkhazians overran the city. They were advancing towards Shevardnadze's headquarters, which were defended by 25 armed body guards. Diplomats and journalists who had contacts with Abkhazians reported that they had received a substantial Russian support, as Russian troops served as pilots, advisers and ground troops. Separatists were controlling television tower and railroad station, they were firing from their artillery positions in the northern hills. Hundreds of Georgian reinforcements managed to cross the river to reinforce the besieged city, although most of the column of reinforcement troops was blocked by Abkhazians. Western part of Sukhumi was controlled by Abkhazian separatists. Shevardnadze said that extra-forces which managed to arrive to the city were not enough.

On 27 September, Abkhazian separatists swept through the city center. Shevardnadze and his allies left Sukhumi. Shevardnadze issued a statement, saying that Russian imperialist forces staged the capture of Sukhumi. He was believed to be in Gulripshi. Western diplomats raised concerns over Russian involvement, saying that Russian hardliners were using Abkhazia as a proxy to challenge Georgia's independence. The diplomats said that American President Bill Clinton and Secretary of State Warren Christopher had taken personal interest in the matter, although it was unlikely that they would pressure Russia because of political instability there. In a statement after the fall of Sukhumi, the Russian Foreign Ministry said that it "categorically denies all accusations of involvement by the Russian Federation and its armed forces in the last outbreak of bloody clashes in Abkhazia." The statement said Russia had made "persistent efforts" to stop the fighting.

On 28 September, Shevardnadze left Abkhazia. He said Georgia must get Sukhumi back. "If this generation is unable to do so, the next generation will do it anyway", he stated. Shevardnadze was evacuated with his TU-134 jet. He said the fall of Sokhumi was a major blow and that he was ready to resign.

On 29 September night, Georgian troops abandoned Sukhumi airport. On 30 September, Abkhazians pushed into Ochamchire. Georgian troops fled to Gali. However, It was also captured by separatists.

Shevardnadze arrived to Tbilisi, where he told reporters: "When the Soviet empire was broken, East Europe was set free. The West won millions of dollars. But now the West doesn't care much about the former republics of the Soviet Union. They forget who helped them destroy the empire". The Independent reported about Western powers: "Lacking vital commercial or strategic interest in the region, they are unwilling to risk any military or other support that might upset the balance of power in Moscow against Boris Yeltsin". The Christian Science Monitor article on 1 October 1993 noted the lack of the Western attention to the conflict:

Unstable and poor republics are collapsing back into Russia, or rejoining Moscow, as Azerbaijan did last week. The question is, how much of the instability in Georgia, Tajikistan, Azerbaijan, and Moldova is being induced? Russian troops are active in these states and are present in several more. Increasingly one hears in Moscow of the "inevitability" or naturalness of regaining parts of its imperial empire. Given the level of chaos and lack of resources in these states, the West is saying nothing. Who cares for Georgia? It is small and unstrategic. Better to back Boris Yeltsin in his historic fight with parliament and not make an issue of Russia's dirty little wars.
The State Department is going further. It is arguing that Russian forces in areas of conflict are a stabilizing presence. US Ambassador to Russia Thomas Pickering, in a Sept. 25 interview, said of Russian troops: "They've been working in Georgia all week to try to bring about calm in that situation." Shevardnazde is likely to have read the statement with a hefty mixture of astonishment and despair.
Such signals lead to the kind of conclusions found in Nezavisimaya Gazeta, a centrist magazine in Moscow, two weeks ago: "Not only is the West not concerned, on the contrary it is very much interested that Russia conduct an imperial policy inside the country in order to preserve our unity and territorial integrity - and also outside with its nearest neighbors and with states within the zones of the former Soviet Union."
Georgia is another small country about which the West knows little. But Georgia alone is not the issue. If Russia begins to reaquire territory, how far does it go? How deep is the pattern? How does Russia act if Yeltsin is deposed? One notes that talk in Moscow of a reaquired Ukraine is not entirely fictional.

A joint force on behalf of both Gamsakhurdia and Shevardnadze clashed with separatists around Ochamchira. Georgian Defense Ministry said that they had entered Ochamchire and there were street battles.

The failure to stop an offensive and the fall of Sukhumi discredeted Russia as a neutral peacekeeper internationally.

The fall of Sukhumi was accompanied by extensive brutality against Georgian civilians, which forced around 200 000 Georgians to flee Abkhazia as the separatists continued their offensive. Their houses were claimed by Abkhazians as the prize properties.

== Massacres and exodus of Georgian population ==
Sizes of Abkhazia's major ethnic groups in 1989 and in 2003

The Kodori Valley and Svaneti which many refugees had to pass to escape Abkhazia.

After capturing Sokhumi, separatists engaged in various atrocities against the Georgian population, including massacres. The Georgian governor of Abkhazia, Zhiuli Shartava was captured and executed by the separatists. Tens of thousands of Georgians were forced to flee the city. As the coastal road was blocked by the Abkhaz troops, for many the only way to escape was through the mountain paths in the early winter snowfields and blizzards. They were forced to flee into the mountains along the northern banks of the Kodori river and through Svaneti, one of the most mountainous regions of Georgia, with many being forced to abandon their cars and walk by foot as the roads were blocked by landslides and were impassible to road traffic. Some were rescued by helicopters, although they could not meet the demand. On 11 October, Georgia appealed for international help to rescue the refugees stuck in the mountains.

The Georgian government estimated that around 40,000 people were forced to flee through the mountains. They were pursued by the Abkhazian soldiers in the Kodori Valley, while they also proceeded to engage in looting. Many refugees experienced starvation, freezing and the Georgian government estimated that 70 died during the weeklong trek. Reporter Hugh Pope compared the exodus to the Iraqi Kurdish exodus of 1991.

== Sources ==
- Papaskiri, Zurab (2007). ნარკვევები თანამედროვე აფხაზეთის ისტორიული წარსულიდან [Findings from the Historical Past of Modern Abkhazia] (in Georgian). Vol. 2. Tbilisi: Sukhumi Branch of Tbilisi State University.
