= Loti Kobalia =

Georgian former military official (born 1950)

- ლოთი ქობალია

Defence Minister of Zviad Gamsakhurdia's rebel government
- In office September 1993 – November 1993
- Preceded by: Position Established
- Succeeded by: Badri Zarandia

Commander of Zugdidi battalion of National Guard of Georgia
- In office 1990–1992

Personal details
- Born: 1950 (age 75–76) Village Odishi, Zugdidi Raion, Georgian SSR, Soviet Union (now Georgia)
- Party: Round Table—Free Georgia

Military service
- Allegiance: Georgia
- Branch/service: National Guard
- Rank: Colonel
- Battles/wars: Georgian Civil War; War in Abkhazia (1992–93); Tamishi landing

Vakhtang "Loti" Kobalia (Georgian: ვახტანგ [ლოთი] ქობალია) (born 1950) is a retired Georgian colonel involved in the civil war of the early 1990s in which he commanded forces loyal to the ousted President Zviad Gamsakhurdia.

Kobalia was a commander of the Zugdidi battalion of the National Guard of Georgia at the time when the armed opposition groups launched a coup against President Gamsakhurdia in December 1991. After Gamsakhurdia's fall in January 1992, Kobalia led resistance to the forces loyal to the new regime led, since March 1992, by Eduard Shevardnadze in the western Georgian province of Mingrelia, Gamsakhurdia's principal powerbase. During the War in Abkhazia in 1993, Kobalia's force joined the government troops in fighting the Abkhaz separatists and their allies from Russia at some point. As the government forces’ defeat in Abkhazia was imminent, Gamsakhurdia returned to Georgia to reclaim power from his base in Zugdidi. Kobalia began disarming the Georgian troops retreating from Abkhazia, blocked major roads in western Georgia and engaged with the government forces in a series of battles which eventually led to Gamsakhurdia's defeat at the end of 1993.

Kobalia was arrested by Ukrainian and Georgian security officers in Kyiv in July 1994. After a year-long trial, the Supreme Court of Georgia in 1996 found Kobalia guilty of treason, banditry, and execution of five captured soldiers and a TV journalist David Bolkvadze during the October 1993 hostilities, and sentenced him to death penalty, which was changed for 20-year imprisonment in 1997. Kobalia denied the charges and accused Shevardnadze's government of fabricating the case. In October 2000 Kobalia and several inmates from the civil war period escaped from the Prison Hospital in Tbilisi, but were recaptured 10 days later in the mountains in the northwest of Georgia. In 2004, he was pardoned by Georgia's newly sworn president Mikheil Saakashvili and released from jail as part of the National Accord policy, leading to protests from Bolkvadze's family and several journalists.

In October 2009, Kobalia joined the opposition party Movement for Fair Georgia, led by Georgia's ex-Prime Minister Zurab Noghaideli.
