= Shroma =

Shroma შრომა, Шрома
- Village
- Location in Georgia Shroma (Abkhazia)
- Coordinates: 43°05′03″N 41°01′57″E
- Country: Georgia
- Partially recognized independent country: Abkhazia
- District: Sukhumi
- Elevation: 270 m (890 ft)

Population (2011)
  - Total: 38
- Time zone: UTC+4 (GET)

Shroma (Georgian: შრომა, Abkhaz: Шрома) is a village in the Sukhumi District in Abkhazia, Georgia. Its altitude above sea level is around 270 m. The distance to Sukhumi is 10 km.

According to the Soviet Census of 1989 Shroma was populated by 1895 inhabitants, mostly Georgians.

== See also ==
- Sukhumi District

== Sources ==
- Georgian Soviet Encyclopedia, V. 11, p. 31, Tbilisi., 1987. (in Georgian)
