= War in Abkhazia (1992–1993) =

Conflict between Georgia and Abkhaz separatists

- Part of the Abkhazia conflict
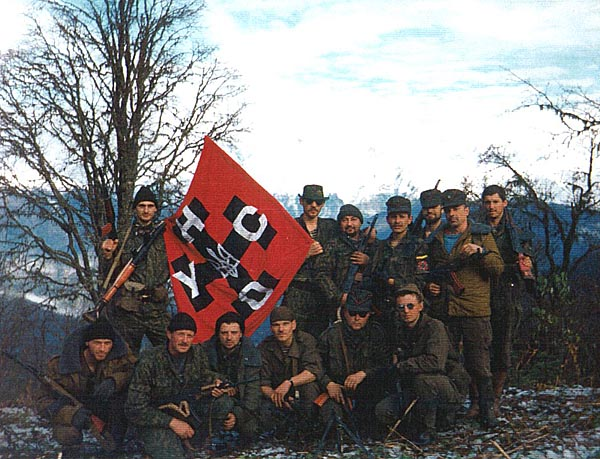
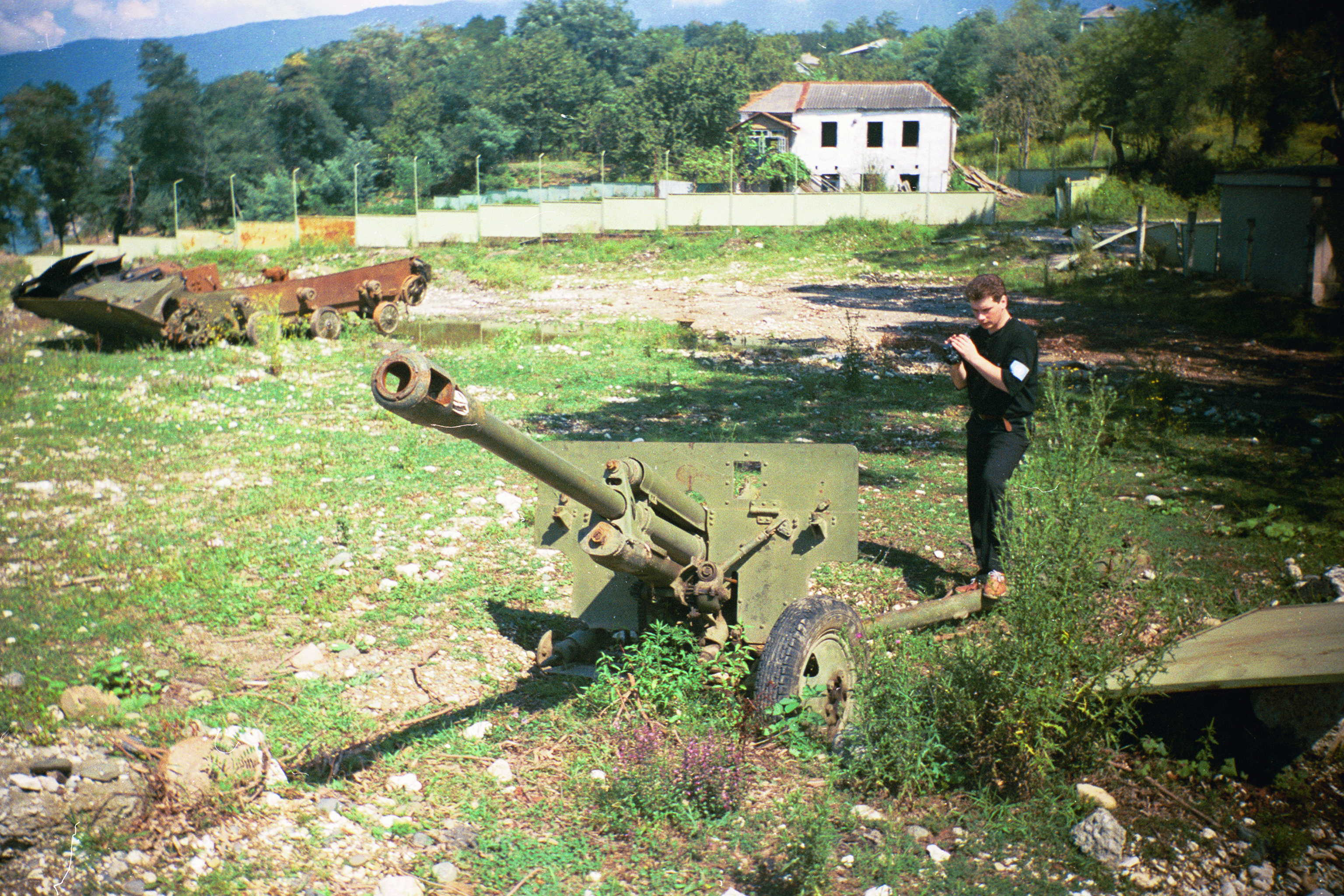
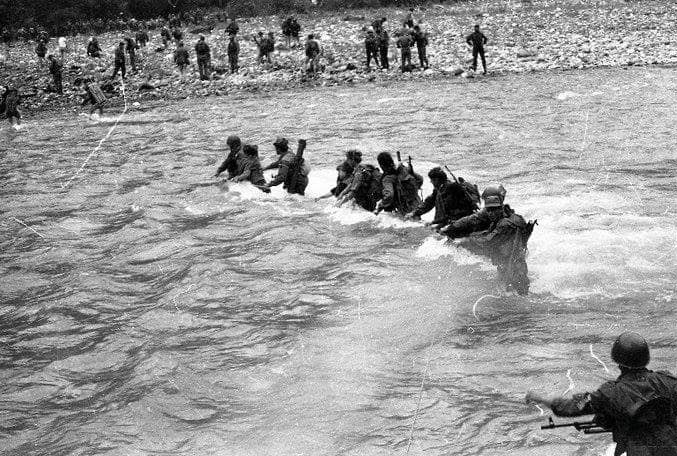
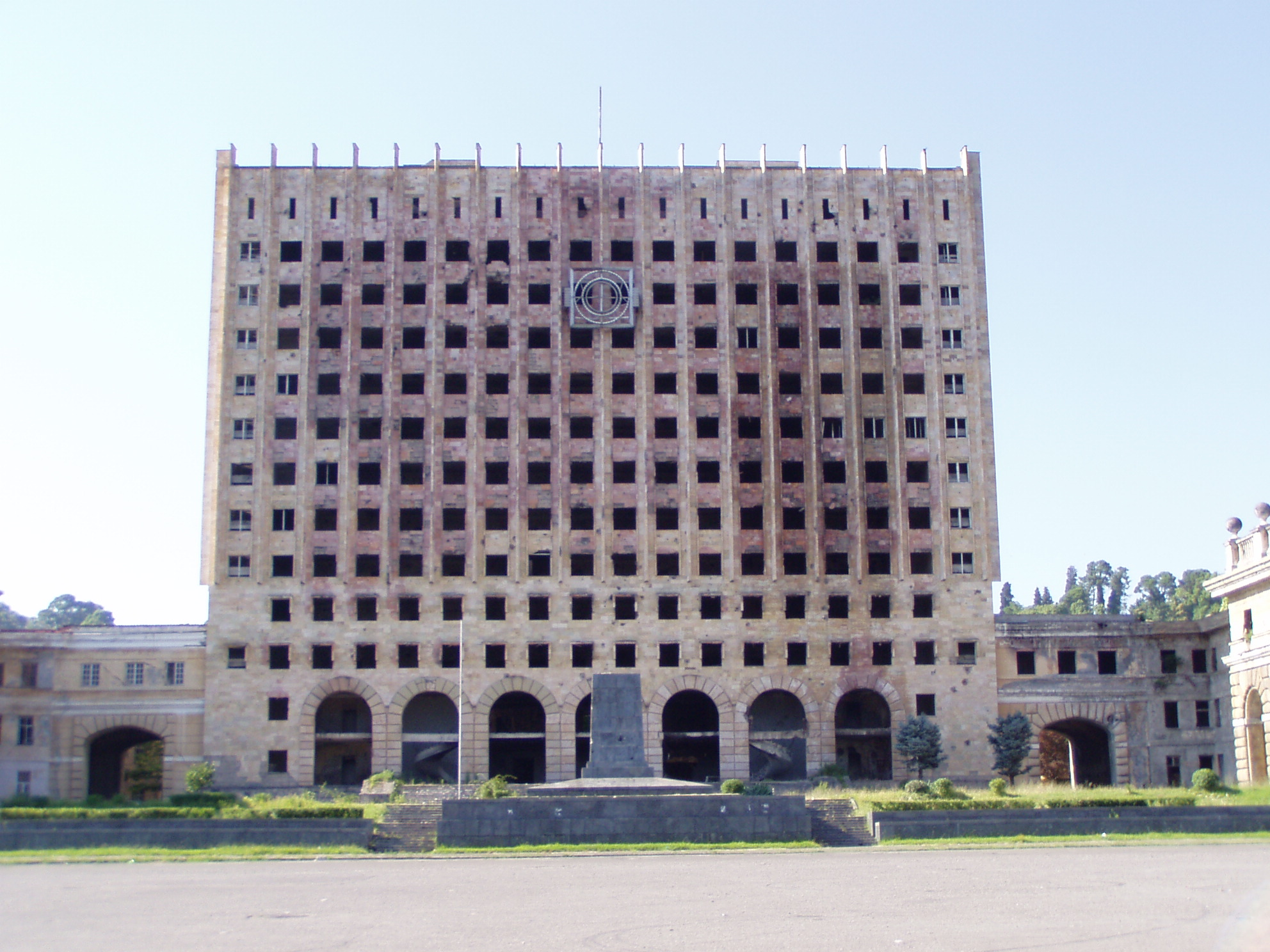
- Clockwise from top: Ukrainian volunteers in Abkhazia; an artillery piece presumably used in the war; the damaged Supreme Soviet of Abkhazia building after the Fall of Sukhumi; separatists crossing the Gumista River during the March Offensive.
Date	14 August 1992 – 30 September 1993 (1 year, 1 month and 16 days)
Location	Abkhazia
Result	Abkhaz victory
Territorial changes	Abkhazia becomes a de facto independent republic; Georgia retains control of Upper Kodori Valley

Belligerents
Abkhazia; CMPC; Russia (Note: See this section for more details.)	Georgia; UNA-UNSO

Commanders and leaders
(Abkhazia) Vladislav Ardzinba; (Abkhazia) Vladimir Arshba; (Abkhazia) Sultan Sosnaliyev; (Abkhazia) Sergei Dbar; Musa Shanibov; Shamil Basayev	(Georgia (country)) Eduard Shevardnadze; (Georgia (country)) Tengiz Kitovani; (Georgia (country)) Tengiz Sigua; Jaba Ioseliani (Note: Leader of the Mkhedrioni paramilitary group.); (Georgia (country)) Zhiuli Shartava †; (Georgia (country)) Giorgi Karkarashvili

Units involved
Abkhaz-aligned forces: Abkhaz National Guard; Bagramyan Battalion; North Caucasian national detachments; Russian volunteers: Russian Air Force; Kuban Cossack Military Society; Don Cossacks; Transnistrian volunteers	Georgian-aligned forces: National Guard of Georgia; Internal Troops of Georgia; Paramilitaries: Mkhedrioni; Pro-Gamsakhurdia militia; Monadire; Ukrainian volunteers: Argo Battalion

Strength
Total: 18,150 soldiers: 13,970 participated in battles; 4,180 served in rear units	Georgia: At least 12,000 soldiers ~150-1,500 Ukrainians; Total weaponry (1993): 120 MBT's and 180 AIFV/APC; 55 aircraft

Casualties and losses
2,220 killed, 8,000 wounded, 1,820 civilians killed, 122 missing	4,000 combatants and civilians killed, 10,000 wounded, 1,000 missing, 250,000 displaced
- 10,000–30,000 dead in total

The War in Abkhazia was fought between Georgian government and paramilitary forces, and a coalition of Abkhaz separatist forces and North Caucasian militants between 1992 and 1993. (Note: The war ended on 30 September 1993, and a ceasefire agreement was signed on 1 December 1993. However, sporadic clashes continued throughout 1994 in the Kodori Valley and Gali Municipality.) Ethnic Georgians who lived in Abkhazia fought largely on the side of Georgian government forces. Ethnic Armenians, who formed the Bagramyan Battalion and Russians within Abkhazia's population largely supported the Abkhazians and many fought on their side. The separatists received support from thousands of North Caucasian and Cossack militants and from the Russian military forces stationed in and near Abkhazia. Ukrainian volunteers fought on the Georgian side. The conflict coincided with the civil war within Georgia proper, where supporters of the ousted president Zviad Gamsakhurdia clashed with the post-coup government led by Eduard Shevardnadze.

Significant human rights violations and atrocities were reported on all sides, peaking in the aftermath of the Abkhaz capture of Sukhumi on 27 September 1993, which was followed by a large-scale campaign of ethnic cleansing against the ethnic Georgian population. A fact-finding mission dispatched by the UN Secretary General in October 1993 reported numerous and serious human rights violations committed both by Abkhazians and by Georgians. Approximately 5,000 ethnic Georgians and 4,000 Abkhaz were reported killed or missing, and 250,000 Georgians became internally displaced or refugees.

The war heavily affected post-Soviet Georgia, which suffered considerable financial, human and psychological damage. The fighting and subsequent continued sporadic conflict have devastated Abkhazia.

== Timeline ==
=== Initial tensions ===
The situation in the Autonomous Soviet Socialist Republic of Abkhazia was tense in the late 1980s amid the collapse of the Soviet Union. Abkhazia, a multiethnic autonomous republic within the Georgian Soviet Socialist Republic, had a population of which 45.7% were Georgians and 17.8% were Abkhazians, while the remainder were other ethnic groups, including Armenians and Russians, according to the 1989 Soviet census. On 18 March 1989, the Lykhny Appeal was issued at a meeting in the eponymous village, signed by the first secretary of the Abkhaz Regional Committee of the Communist Party of the Soviet Union, Boris Adleyba, and the chairman of the Abkhaz Supreme Soviet, Valerian Kobakhia. The appeal called for Abkhazia to secede from Georgia and become either a separate union republic or part of the RSFSR. The local Georgian population of Abkhazia responded with counter-protests in the regional capital of Sukhumi, beginning on 25 March 1989. The Lykhny Appeal was also co-signed by the rector of the Abkhazian State University.

Ethnic Georgian students at the university announced plans for protests and called for the establishment of a separate branch for Georgian students in Abkhazia. The Georgian government approved the proposal by establishing a branch of Tbilisi State University (Note: Georgia's principal university at the time.) in Sukhumi. Georgian anti-Soviet, pro-independence dissident groups claimed that the Soviet government, acting through the local Communist Party leadership, was using Abkhaz separatism to counter Georgian demands for independence from the Soviet Union. On 9 April, Soviet troops were deployed to Tbilisi and dispersed demonstrations calling for Georgian independence, resulting in casualties.

The 9 April tragedy and the storming of the building housing the Sukhumi branch of Tbilisi State University by armed Abkhazians eventually led to the first clashes between representatives of the Abkhaz and Georgian populations, which took place in Sukhumi on 16–17 July 1989. The resulting civil unrest quickly escalated into armed confrontations that, according to official accounts, left 18 people dead and at least 448 wounded, 302 of them Georgians. In response, Interior Ministry troops were deployed to quell the unrest.

Mikhail Gorbachev, who faced pressure from hardliners within the Communist Party of the Soviet Union who blamed him for the "loss of Eastern Europe", as well as from Soviet republics demanding independence, opposed the secession of any Soviet territory from the USSR. The Law on Secession was passed in April 1990 in an attempt to establish a legal mechanism for a right that had existed on paper under the Soviet Constitution, while simultaneously making the secession process more difficult. The law specified the procedures that Soviet republics had to follow to secede from the Soviet Union, while also granting autonomous republics and other regions the right to remain in the USSR. This increased the potential cost of secession for the union republics by creating the possibility that they could lose territory. Under Gorbachev, the Kremlin encouraged Abkhaz separatists as part of a divide-and-rule strategy to undermine stability in Georgia and weaken its national independence movement.

=== War of laws ===
By July 1990, as neither side considered itself strong enough to resolve the dispute militarily, Georgian-Abkhaz tensions became largely confined to the legislatures, turning Abkhazia into a legal battleground and what was described as a "war of laws" until armed hostilities broke out in August 1992. In December 1990, the Abkhaz Supreme Soviet elected Vladislav Ardzinba, a member of the hardline Soyuz faction in the Congress of People's Deputies of the Soviet Union, as its chairman. Ardzinba, a charismatic but excitable figure who was popular among Abkhazians, was believed by Georgians to have helped instigate the violence of July 1989. Ardzinba subsequently reneged on pre-election promises to increase Georgian representation in Abkhazia's autonomous institutions and sought to rule Abkhazia relatively single-handedly. For the time being, however, he avoided open conflict with the central authorities in Tbilisi.

Georgia boycotted the 17 March 1991 all-Union referendum on the preservation of the Soviet Union proposed by Mikhail Gorbachev. In Abkhazia, however, 52.3% of the population, comprising almost all of the ethnic non-Georgian population, participated in the referendum, with 98.6% voting to preserve the Union. Most ethnic non-Georgians in Abkhazia subsequently boycotted the 31 March referendum on Georgia's independence, which was supported by an overwhelming majority of the Georgian population. Within weeks, Georgia declared independence from the Soviet Union on 9 April 1991 under former Soviet dissident Zviad Gamsakhurdia.

In an effort to reach a compromise, Georgian President Zviad Gamsakhurdia negotiated electoral law reforms in August 1991 that granted the Abkhaz significant over-representation in the local Abkhazian Supreme Soviet, despite Georgians comprising 46% of Abkhazia's population and Abkhazians only 18%. Under the ethnic quotas introduced ahead of the 1991 elections, the 65 seats were allocated with 28 to Abkhazians, 26 to Georgians, and the remaining 11 to other ethnic groups. A two-thirds majority was required to pass "important legislation", ensuring that key decisions could not be adopted without the support of both Abkhaz and Georgian deputies and, in principle, giving each side veto power. The elections to the Abkhazian Supreme Soviet under this system were held in late 1991 and were the first multi-party elections in Abkhazia in 69 years. However, the Supreme Soviet soon became polarized between its ethnic Abkhaz chairman, Vladislav Ardzinba, and its ethnic Georgian first deputy chairman, Tamaz Nadareishvili.

Ardzinba created the Abkhazian National Guard that was mono-ethnically Abkhaz, and initiated a practice of replacing ethnic Georgians in leading positions with Abkhaz. He used the civil war that began with the overthrow of Gamsakhurdia in Georgia to pursue Abkhazia's separation, repealing numerous Georgian laws in Abkhazia and placing local enterprises and organizations, including the military and police, under regional jurisdiction.

The power-sharing agreement negotiated in 1991 soon proved unsustainable. Tensions escalated on 24 June 1992 when Abkhaz armed formations broke into the office of the ethnic Georgian Minister of Internal Affairs of Abkhazia, Givi Lominadze, beat him, and forcibly removed him from office, replacing him with an Abkhaz candidate who was appointed without the consent of the Georgian deputies of the Abkhaz Supreme Soviet. In June 1992, Ardzinba submitted a draft treaty proposing a federative/confederative arrangement to the ruling Georgian State Council. It was rejected by the Georgian leadership. The federative/confederative treaty proposed by Ardzinba declared Abkhazia to be a sovereign state and a "full-fledged participant in international and external economic relations". It further provided that Georgia and Abkhazia would "recognize each other as sovereign states", mutually recognize each other's territorial integrity, and refrain from "interfering in each other's internal affairs". The treaty also stipulated that Abkhazia would have the authority to conclude treaties independently with other states, republics of the Russian Federation, and members of the Commonwealth of Independent States (CIS); that Abkhazian law would take precedence within its territory; and that Georgia and Abkhazia would each possess separate citizenships, with dual citizenship permitted on the basis of a bilateral interstate agreement. The Georgian side opposed these provisions and rejected the proposal, arguing that it had been drafted without the participation of Georgian deputies. Georgians viewed the draft treaty as an attempt to disguise the division of the country into two sovereign states under the guise of a federation, maintaining that Abkhazia already possessed a significant degree of autonomy within Georgia, while the treaty went beyond autonomy and instituted a separate statehood.

On 23 July 1992, in response to Georgia's restoration of the 1921 Georgian Constitution, the Abkhaz Supreme Soviet restored the 1925 Abkhaz Constitution by a simple majority of 35 of its 65 deputies. The restoration of the 1925 Constitution without the required two-thirds majority clearly violated the power-sharing agreement. The 1925 Constitution stated that Abkhazia had established relations with Georgia on the basis of a "union treaty" and recognized its right to secede from the Transcaucasian Socialist Federative Soviet Republic and the Soviet Union. The constitution provided only for alliance commitments with Georgia and declared Abkhazia "a sovereign state, exercising state power over its territory independently from any other power". Ardzinba announced that Abkhazia "will discuss the question of resuming normal international relations with Georgia", while Georgia's new leader, Eduard Shevardnadze, retorted that the decision had been taken "without considering the opinion of the majority of Abkhazian population".

Abkhazian deputies justified their move with the following reasoning: the status of the Abkhaz ASSR and its relations with the Georgian SSR were defined by the 1978 constitutions of Abkhazia and Georgia, as well as the 1977 Soviet Constitution. In 1989–1990, Georgia unilaterally passed a number of legal acts that paved the way for its withdrawal from the USSR. Through these acts, Georgia recognized Soviet power and all legal acts adopted by it from 25 February 1921 as illegal and void. In February 1992, Georgia's provisional military council restored the pre-Soviet 1921 constitution of the Democratic Republic of Georgia, which did not account for the existence of the Abkhaz ASSR. Thus, the Georgian SSR ceased to exist, and so did its relationship with the Abkhaz ASSR, while the restored Democratic Republic of Georgia had no relations with it. This, in turn, justified the Abkhaz ASSR in restoring the 1925 constitution of the Abkhaz SSR to fill the resulting legal vacuum.

However, according to the Georgian side, this justification did not hold water. The Democratic Republic of Georgia was not actually restored, and Georgia continued to be referred to as the "Republic of Georgia," as before. (Note: In 1990, the Georgian SSR was renamed into the "Republic of Georgia".) The provisional military council lacked legal authority and adopted only a political declaration, not a state legal act. At the same time, the declaration recognized the "supremacy of the constitution of the Democratic Republic of Georgia" within the "modern realities," such as the "current borders and national-state structure of the Republic of Georgia, without changing the status of Abkhazia and Adjara". Abkhaz autonomy had existed within the Democratic Republic of Georgia since 11 June 1918 and was officially confirmed on 20 March 1919 by the elected Abkhaz People's Council. The constitution of the Democratic Republic of Georgia explicitly mentioned the autonomous status of Abkhazia within its borders. Furthermore, the 1925 constitution of the Abkhaz SSR never entered into legal force even in the 1920s; it was rejected in 1926 by the Abkhaz supreme legislative bodies. Therefore, the "restoration" of this constitution constituted an attempt to illegally secede from Georgia. According to Vicken Cheterian, the Abkhazian government did not seek a secession as it was fearful of losing the autonomy Abkhazia enjoyed at the time. According to Agnieszka Miarka, the restoration of the Abkhazian SSR-era constitution on 23 July 1992, which declared Abkhazia as a sovereign state exercising independent authority on its territory, must be construed as a declaration of independence, serving as the immediate cause of the conflict. The Abkhazian authorities terminated the enforcement of the Georgian Constitution within Abkhazian territory.

By late July, Ardzinba's rhetoric had heated up and he declared that Abkhazia was "strong enough to fight Georgia should this prove necessary". According to Svante Cornell, this rhetoric was likely conditioned by the existing knowledge of the forthcoming outside support, notably from the Russian military forces.

=== Georgian civil war in Abkhazia ===
In a parallel development, the 1991–1992 Georgian coup d'état in the Georgian capital Tbilisi led to the Georgian Civil War. The confrontation soon moved from the capital to the Western Georgia, and Sukhumi, along with other Western Georgian cities like Zugdidi and Poti, emerged as a stronghold of fugitive president Zviad Gamsakhurdia. On 8 January 1992, 2,000 supporters of Gamsakhurdia rallied in Sukhumi, defying a ban on rallies imposed by the interim ruling Military Council. After suppressing pro-Gamsakhurdia rallies in Tbilisi, the Military Council moved to solidify control over Western Georgia. On 28 January, they seized Zugdidi and in February entered Abkhazia. On 6 February, the National Guard of Georgia and the units of the Mkhedrioni took Sukhumi, the last major Gamsakhurdia outpost. No armed clashes were reported and the operation was conducted peacefully, the railway in Abkhazia resumed functioning. On 10 February, the forces of the Military Council reached the western border of the country and then were withdrawn from Abkhazia.

On 11 August, 1992, the Georgian civil war reached another point of escalation when six Georgian government officials were taken hostage by pro-Gamsakhurdia guerrillas in Zugdidi, where the Georgian ruling State Council exercised only loose control. This was part of the hit-and-run campaign waged by armed Gamsakhurdia supporters mainly in Tbilisi and their stronghold in Western Georgia against the State Council. The chairman of the State Council Eduard Shevardnadze reacted by calling for armed response against the rebels. The hostages were then taken to a hiding place in Abkhazia. On 11 August, the Georgian State Council declared the state of emergency on the Georgian railway.

=== Georgian operation ===
On 13 August 1992, 3,000 Georgian troops arrived outside Zugdidi, after the State Council ordered them to take control of roads, bridges, and railways in western Georgia. On August 14, the National Guard of Georgia entered Abkhazia. The official goal was to free the captive Georgian officials and restore order on the railway network. One in every ten trains had been robbed in Abkhazia, while Abkhaz separatist leader Vladislav Ardzinba spurned reconciliation talks with Georgia after declaring independence. 12 Georgian government officials were held hostage in Abkhazia by the supporters of ousted Georgian president Zviad Gamsakhurdia, and the Georgian National Guard units led by Tengiz Kitovani followed them into Abkhazia to prevent the kidnappers' escape. Among those held hostage were Georgian interior minister Roman Gventsadze, deputy interior minister Zilbert Khazalia, and national security adviser David Salaridze.

The Abkhaz separatist authorities reacted violently to the perceived transgression of their self-proclaimed sovereignty. The Abkhaz troops were the first to open fire against the Georgian National Guard units, killing up to 50. This confrontation happened near the village of Ilori, 50 kilometers away from Sukhumi. Kitovani's forces proceeded to arrest the head of administration of Ochamchira and skirmished with the Abkhaz forces outside the town. According to the Georgian reasoning, "the Georgian troops entered Abkhazia to guard highways and railways, but since they met resistance from the Abkhaz militia, which was an illegal armed formation, it was natural that the government troops should try to suppress this resistance and also depose those who inspired it – the separatist Abkhaz government led by Ardzinba". The Abkhaz separatist authorities retreated to Gudauta, where the Russian military base was located. United Nations High Commissioner for Refugees reported the ethnic-based violence against Georgians in Gudauta. After taking Sukhumi, the Georgian forces engaged in ethnically based pillage, looting, assault, and murder.

On 15 August, Georgian National Guard and Mkhedrioni made a naval landing in Gagra District and by 19 August, they took control over the whole territory up to the Georgia–Russia border. Separatists in Gugauta were blocked; this severed their auto and railway connections to Russia, the only way they could receive military support from Russia now was through mountains.

On 22 August 1992, the Confederation of Mountain Peoples of the Caucasus published a decree of its president Musa Shanibov and the chairman of the parliament Iysuph Soslanbekov:

"As there is no other way to withdraw Georgian occupants' army from the territory of the sovereign Abkhazia and in order to implement the resolution of the 10th Session of the CMPC, we order:

1. All headquarters of the Confederation have to dispatch volunteers to the territory of Abkhazia to crush the aggressor militarily.
2. All military formations of the Confederation have to conduct military actions against any forces who oppose them and try to reach the territory of Abkhazia by any method.
3. To announce Tbilisi as a zone of disaster. At that use all methods, including terrorist acts.
4. To declare all people of Georgian ethnicity on the territory of Confederation as hostages.
5. All type of cargoes directed to Georgia shall be detained."

In August 1992 several large groups of volunteers, mostly Kabardian, Adyghe, Circassian and Chechen, came to Abkhazia by trucks and helicopters from North Caucasus. In response, Georgia mobilized parts of its armed forces on 23 August. Musa Shanibov, one of the leaders of the CMPC militants, declared:

Our enemy must see how we're uniting and gaining strength. We need to thoroughly consider our operations and evaluate small, yet important facts. We need to act professionally. We need to quickly learn how to kill, hack, cut off noses, etc.

On 25 August, Giorgi Karkarashvili, the Georgian military commander, announced via television that the Georgian forces would not take any POWs. He promised that no harm would be done to peaceful residents of Abkhazia and that peace talks would be conducted. He warned separatists that if the peace talks didn't succeed and if 100,000 Georgians were killed, that the remaining 97,000 ethnic Abkhaz, who supported Ardzinba, would perish. Karkarashvili later allegedly threatened the Abkhaz politician Vladislav Ardzinba not to take any actions that would leave the Abkhaz nation without descendants and thus placed the responsibility for future deaths on Ardzinba personally. Later, his speech was used by the separatists as propaganda and to justify their own actions. According to Vicken Cheterian's War and Peace in the Caucasus: "Although the Georgian declarations sound like a threat of genocide, the Georgian leadership was not inclined to organize massacres in Abkhazia and destroy Abkhaz nation. Georgian fighters did commit mass violations of human rights, and in some localized cases ethnic cleansing, but there is no evidence that their objective was mass annihilation of Abkhaz people". The Georgian philosopher Gia Nodia commented on Karkarashvili's statement: "I happened to watch interview of Karkarashvili which was quoted and, although I do not remember the exact wording myself, can say that what he meant was that it is silly on the Abkhaz side to fight, that Georgians will never give up Abkhazia, so the Abkhaz are putting their very existence in danger - even if one hundred thousand people died in the war on each side, Georgians would still be there, but not the Abkhaz. This may have been nasty statement, but Karkarashvili was merely expressing in his own way the idea that was always reiterated by Georgian officials at the time — that it was the radicalism of the Abkhazia's leadership, not Georgia's, that endangered the existence of the Abkhaz as a group".

At the end of this stage of the conflict, the Georgian Army had taken most of Abkhazia. Pockets of Abkhaz forces were besieged in parts of Ochamchira District and Tkvarcheli, while in Gudauta they were pinched between Georgian troops in Gagra and Sukhumi.

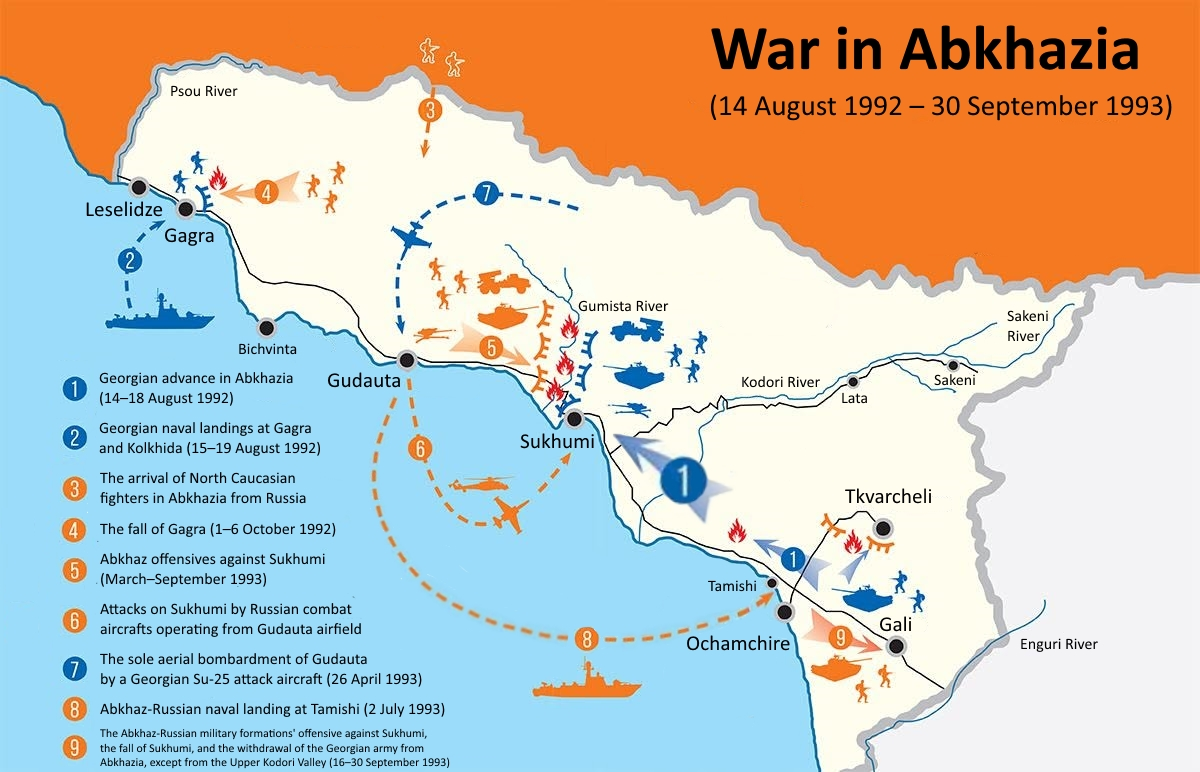
Events of the war.

=== Ceasefire and Fall of Gagra ===
On 3 September 1992, a ceasefire was negotiated in Moscow. According to the agreement, Georgian forces were obliged to withdraw from Gagra district. The Georgian side carried out the implementation of the agreement and left its positions. As a result, the local Georgian population of Gagra remained defenseless. The ceasefire was soon violated by the Abkhaz side. Thousands of volunteer paramilitaries, mainly Chechens and Cossacks from the militarized Confederation of Mountain Peoples of the Caucasus (CMPC) and the Abkhaz military, equipped with T-72 tanks, BM-21 Grad rocket launchers, Sukhoi Su-25 attack planes, and helicopters, launched a major offensive. Georgia accused Russia of supplying this equipment, as it had not been previously used by the Abkhaz.

Events of the war in October 1992 – August 1993

Abkhaz and CMPC forces attacked the town of Gagra on 1 October. The small Georgian force remaining in the town briefly defended Gagra before retreating, then regrouped and recaptured the town. The Abkhaz and CMPC forces reconsolidated and launched another attack, capturing Gagra on 2 October. The Russian navy began to blockade the seaport near Gagra. The naval vessels: "SKP-Bezukoriznenniy", "KIL-25", "BTH-38", "BM-66", "Golovin", "Landing 345", "Aviation 529" ("SU-25", "SU-27"), "MI- and Anti-Aircraft 643". Regiments were commanded by the first deputy Minister of Defense of the Russian Federation, G. Kolesnikov, took part in the occupation of Gagra. The Russian tanker "Don" delivered 420 tons of fuel to Separatist-held Gudauta.

Thousands of Georgian soldiers and civilians fled north, entering Russia before being transported to Georgia proper.

Abkhaz forces, largely supported by the Russian military presence in the region, were now in control over Gagra, Gudauta (where a former Russian military base remains) and Tkvarcheli and rapidly approaching Sukhumi.

The expelled Georgians fled to Russia through the land border or were evacuated by Russian Navy.

=== Bombing and siege of Sukhumi ===
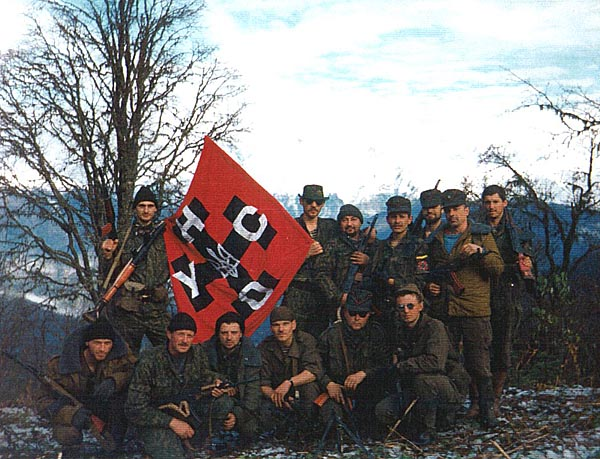
Ukrainian UNA - UNSO volunteers in Georgia

In October 1992, two attempts were launched by Abkhaz separatists to take control over Ochamchire city. Both of these attempts failed as Georgians withstood Abkhazian attacks.

On 29 November, Abkhaz separatists took control over large Georgian village Kochara near Tkvarcheli, and conducted a campaign of ethnic cleansing against ethnic Georgians.

In December 1992, Abkhaz troops began the shelling of Georgian-held Sukhumi. On 4 March 1993, Eduard Shevardnadze, head of the State Council of Georgia, arrived in the capital of the region to take control over the defensive operations in the city. The Minister of Economy, Beslan Kobakhia, arrived in Sukhumi during the negotiations with Goga Khaindrava. According to Kobakhia, separatist leader Ardzinba would resign if Shevardnadze would do the same. As commander-in-chief of Georgian Military Forces, Eduard Shevardnadze issued the order "measures on the defense of Ochamchira and the Sukhumi regions" that stated: "Military formations of different countries are concentrating in Gudauta and Gumista area. We have information that those forces have the serious goal of seizing Sukhumi and bringing chaos and turmoil to all of Georgia." On 10 February, Shevardnadze appointed Guram Gabiskiria as Mayor of Sukhumi. Meanwhile, the Georgian Parliament made an official declaration blaming Russia for aggression against Georgia and demanding the withdrawal of all Russian military forces from the territory of Abkhazia.

On 16 March 1993, at 6 and 9 am the Abkhaz and the Confederation forces launched a full-scale attack on Sukhumi resulting in mass destruction and heavy casualties among civilians. At 2 am the Abkhaz side began artillery bombardments of Georgian positions at the Gumista River and Sukhumi. Later in the day several Russian Su-25 planes attacked Sukhumi through the morning of the next day. A Russian special detachment led the operation followed by Abkhaz fighters and CMPC volunteers. They crossed the Gumista River and took part of Achadara, but Georgian forces successfully stopped their advance.

On 14 May, a short-lived ceasefire was signed. According to Georgian sources, on 2 July Russian navy ship landed up to 600 Russian Airborne Troops close to the village Tamishi, and engaged in a fierce battle with Georgian troops. The battle was one of the bloodiest in the war, with several hundred killed and wounded on both sides. Despite initial setbacks, the Georgian forces managed to retake their positions.

=== Abkhaz offensive on Eshera, Gulripshi, Kamani and Shroma ===
The villages along the Gumista river (north and east of Sukhumi) such as Achadara, Kamani and Shroma, which were heavily populated by ethnic Georgians became a strategically important area, which enabled motorized units to reach Sukhumi, the capital of Abkhazia. After a failed attempt to storm Sukhumi from the west, the Abkhaz formations and their allies diverted their offensive on the northern and eastern sides of Sukhumi. On 2 July 1993 under Russian military directives and naval support, the Abkhaz and their (Confederation of Mountain Peoples of the Caucasus) allies attacked the villages on the Gumista river. The Georgian side didn't expect any offensive from the northern or eastern side of Sukhumi District. The Georgian forces suffered heavy losses (as many as 500 dead within an hour of the attack) and the defensive line around Sukhumi was breached by the Abkhaz offensive. On 5 July 1993, Abkhaz, Armenian Bagramyan battalion, Russian and North Caucasian detachments stormed the villages of Akhalsheni, Guma and Shroma of Sukhumi district. The last offensive took place on 9 July, on the village of Kamani. Kamani was a Svan (sub-ethnic group of the Georgian people) village, which also included an Orthodox Church (named after St. George) and convent. After the fall of the village, most of its inhabitants (including nuns and priests) were killed by Abkhaz formations and their allies (see Kamani massacre).

By this time, Abkhaz separatist forces occupied almost all the strategic heights and began to besiege Sukhumi. Soon after, the chairman of the Georgian Council of Defense of Abkhazia Tamaz Nadareishvili resigned due to ill health and was succeeded by Member of the Georgian Parliament Zhiuli Shartava. On 27 July 1993, a ceasefire agreement was signed.

On 15 August 1993, Greece carried out a humanitarian operation, Operation Golden Fleece, evacuating 1,015 Greeks who had decided to flee from the war-ridden Abkhazia.

Similarly, 170 Estonians of Abkhazia were evacuated with three flights by the Republic of Estonia in 1992 (according to another source, around 400 Estonians altogether fled to Estonia during the war).

=== Fall of Sukhumi ===
Events of the war in August 1993 – October 1993

Another Russian-mediated ceasefire was agreed in Sochi on 27 July and lasted until 16 September, when Abkhazian separatists violated the agreement (citing Georgia's failure to comply with the terms of the agreement) and launched a large-scale offensive against Sukhumi. During the siege, Russian jets dropped thermobaric bombs on Georgian residential districts in Sukhumi and Georgian villages along the Gumista River. Russian journalist Dmitry Kholodov stayed in Sukhumi before it fell, and reported that the city was repeatedly shelled by Russian forces, causing heavy civilian casualties.

After a fierce battle, Sukhumi fell on 27 September. Shevardnadze addressed the population of Sukhumi by radio and then left the city narrowly escaping death. Almost all members of the Georgian-backed Abkhaz government, who refused to leave the city, including Guram Gabiskiria, Raul Eshba and Zhiuli Shartava, were murdered. Soon Abkhaz forces and the Confederates overran the whole territory of Abkhazia, but the upper Kodori Valley remained in Georgian hands. The total defeat of Georgian forces was accompanied by the ethnic cleansing of the Georgian population.

In the concluding phase of the battle of Sukhumi, the Abkhaz forces shot down three Georgian civilian airliners belonging to Transair Georgia, killing 136 people (some of whom were Georgian soldiers).

Large numbers (about 5,000) of Georgian civilians and servicemen were evacuated by Russian ships during the last hours of the battle.

== Russia's role in the conflict ==
Although Russia officially claimed neutrality during the war in Abkhazia, Russian military officials and politicians were involved in the conflict in several ways. Russia's policy during the war in Abkhazia has been described as inconsistent and "full of ambiguities", shaped by various domestic political actors which argued for different interests. Moscow's policy toward the conflict was shaped by the dynamics of Russian domestic politics. Russian involvement in the conflict initially began with local Russian military units transferring military supplies to the separatist side, but gradually evolved into more coordinated and direct involvement aligned with Russia’s broader security and diplomatic objectives.

In reaction to the outbreak of conflict, Russian president Boris Yeltsin presented his role as a mediator. In September, 1992, Yeltsin called both sides of the conflict to take part in the negotiations in Moscow. On 3 September 1992, Russian president Boris Yeltsin and Head of State Council of the Republic of Georgia Eduard Shevardnadze signed an agreement, formally known as Summary Document of the Moscow Meeting. (Note: Abkhaz representatives were invited to the meeting and participated in the discussions, but due to Abkhazia not being recognized by either Georgia or Russia, the agreement was signed between Georgia and Russia as between two sovereign states.) This agreement temporarily ended military hostilities in Abkhazia. Through this ceasefire, Abkhazia was recognized within the internationally established borders of Georgia.

However, the Russian parliament and Russian military took a strong pro-Abkhazian position. Their pressure eventually led to a shift in Russia's foreign policy. In parliament, the neo-communist and nationalist faction constituted a majority and formed main opposition to Yeltsin's policy. The main motivation was to pressure Georgia to enter the CIS and ensure Russia's military presence in the South Caucasus. They also accused Shevardnadze of being responsible for the collapse of the Soviet Union. Russian military had a dominant weight in the formulation of a policy in the Abkhaz Conflict, and it led to Russian Defence Ministry adopting staunch pro-Abkhazian stance. Russian defence minister Pavel Grachev argued that the loss of Abkhazia would mean the loss of the Black Sea for Russia. The Ministry of Defence took more heavy-handed approach towards Georgia compared to the president and the Foreign Ministry.

By the time of the War in Abkhazia, the Russia's foreign policy elite was divided between the interventionist and non-interventionist camps. The non-interventionist camp was primarily represented by the Foreign Ministry and its liberal head Andrei Kozyrev, who was wary of unilateral military intervention in the former Soviet republics, while the interventionist camp, represented by the nationalists and pragmaticists, supported the use of force or economic and political pressure to align the former Soviet republics. Vice President Alexander Rutskoi and Defense Minister Pavel Grachev notably belonged to the interventionist camp. Yeltsin started out as a non-interventionist, similarly to Mikhail Gorbachev, who abstained from intervening in the Eastern Bloc countries, however, Yeltsin's positions would later shift and they would often be inconsistent. The rapid collapse of the Eastern Bloc, the "loss" of Europe and the Soviet Union bolstered the interventionist camp in Russia and led to more interventionist policies by the Russian military in the post-Soviet conflicts, with the initial success encouraging more wide scale measures.

Although the Foreign Ministry was dominant in formulating the Russia's foreign policy in 1992, the Russian military and the Defence Ministry headed by Grachev gained an upper hand in formulating the Russian policy in the "near abroad" as Yeltsin had to increasingly rely on the military in his confrontation with the Russian parliament. The presence of the Russian (former Soviet) military in all post-Soviet republics due to its deployment there in the last years of the Soviet Union amidst the local unrests gave it further advantage in formulating the Russia's "near abroad" policy. Similarly, Russia's intelligence agencies also rivaled the Foreign Ministry and the Federal Counterintelligence Service in particular was heavily involved in the covert operations to distribute the arms in the former Soviet Union, including in Abkhazia. All of this often created a gap between the statements of the Russian Foreign Ministry on the post-Soviet conflicts and the actions of the Russian military units there, including in Georgia. The Russian military and the intelligence agencies favored the Abkhaz side, and the local Russian military units distributed thousands of submachine guns and several armored vehicles to the Abkhazs even before the outbreak of the conflict. By late July 1992, before the outbreak of the war, the rhetoric of Vladislav Ardzinba, the leader of the Abkhaz separatists, had intensified, and he declared that Abkhazia was "strong enough to fight Georgia should this prove necessary". According to Svante Cornell, this rhetoric was likely conditioned by prior knowledge of the forthcoming outside support from Russian military forces, with which Abkhaz separatist leaders had close ties. Although Yeltsin and Kozyrev emphasized the role of negotiations in resolving the regional conflicts in 1992, their positions soon shifted under the pressure and by early 1993 Russia's official policy began to mirror the military's assistance to the Abkhaz side. Yeltsin allowed Grachev to control Russian policy towards Georgia, and Grachev took the main role from Yeltsin in the Georgian-Russian talks over Abkhazia. This soured the relations with Georgia, and in April 1993 Eduard Shevardandze flew to Ukraine to enlist Ukraine's support in mediating the conflict.

Russia also transferred arms to Georgia under the bilateral agreements on division of former Soviet military assets. It included Georgia's main battle tanks, armored personnel carriers, heavy artillery and heavy mortars. On 15 May 1992, at the CIS summit meeting in Tashkent, in which Georgia participated as an observer, Georgia and seven CIS states - Armenia, Azerbaijan, Belarus, Kazakhstan, Moldova, Russia and Ukraine – established quotas on dividing Soviet assets limited under the 1990 Treaty on Conventional Armed Forces in Europe. The Georgian share included 220 combat tanks, 220 armored combat vehicles, 250 guns, 100 combat aircraft, and 50 strike helicopters. Under the Tashkent agreement, Russia transferred to Georgia 109 tanks, 203 ACVs, and 13 artillery systems. The whole Akhaltsikhe motorised rifle division was turned over to Georgia on 22 September 1992. However, on 25 September 1992, the Russian Supreme Soviet (parliament) passed a resolution which condemned Georgia, supported Abkhazia, demanded the deployment of a Russian peacekeeping force in the region and suspended the delivery of weapons and equipment to Georgia. It was sponsored by Sergei Baburin, a Russian deputy who met Vladislav Ardzinba and argued that he was not that much sure that Abkhazia was part of Georgia. However, some arms still reached Georgia in semi-legal and illegal ways. Russia's warfare market was the main source of weapons for both conflicting sides. Based on variety of reasons, such as corruption and personal sympathies, the weapons were transferred to both sides of the war, although mostly to the Abkhaz side. Some prearranged transfers of equipment to Georgia based on the pre-existing agreements were also continued by the Russian government.

The Georgian authorities protested against the Russian parliament's resolution on Abkhazia and the decision to suspend the arms delivery, assessing it as an interference into Georgia's internal affairs. On 3 October, the Georgian State Council voted to take over the Russian (former Soviet) military hardware on Georgian territory, while Russian defence minister Pavel Grachev warned that it could lead to armed clashes with Russian military units. Some weapons were gained by local raids on Russian Army bases in Akhalkalaki, Batumi, Poti and Vaziani by irregular Georgian paramilitary forces. After several attacks, Russia, including President Boris Yeltsin, condemned Georgia and declared that it would defend its bases with force.

Prior to the outbreak of the war, the Abkhaz leadership arranged for the redeployment of a Russian airborne battalion from the Baltic states to Sukhumi. According to the Russian historian Svetlana Mikhailovna Chervonnaya, a number of Russian security servicemen also arrived in Abkhazia as "tourists" during that summer: "The main load in the preparation of Abkhazian events was given to staff of the former KGB. Almost all of them got appointments in Abkhazia under cover of neutral establishments, which had nothing to do with their real activities. To distract attention, various ruses were resorted to, such as the private exchange of apartments, or the necessity of moving one's place of work to Abkhazia due to a sudden deterioration of health."

According to another Russian expert, Evgeni Kozhokin, director of the Russian Institute of Strategic Studies, prior to the outbreak of hostilities, Abkhaz guardsmen had been supplied with weaponry by Russia's 643rd anti-aircraft missile regiment and a military unit stationed in Gudauta. Ardzinba had major supporters in Moscow as well, including Vice President Alexander Rutskoy and the Speaker of the Russian Supreme Soviet, Ruslan Khasbulatov.

After the eruption of armed conflict, the Abkhaz separatist paramilitary units, along with their political supporters fled to Gudauta from where they obtained significant amount of military and financial aid. In Gudauta, the Russian Army base housed and trained Abkhaz paramilitary units and provided protection for the leader of the Abkhaz separatists, Vladislav Ardzinba.

In October 1992, the Abkhaz side violated the 3 September ceasefire agreement and launched an offensive on Gagra. The Georgian government saw the role of resolution passed by the Russia's parliament in resuming the conflict, and blamed "reactionary forces" in Russia for encouraging the Abkhaz offensive. The Russian Supreme Soviet, utilizing the Soviet-era provisions in the Russian constitution which still vested it with the ultimate authority in the foreign and security policy, ordered Yeltsin to conduct a new round of negotiations on 25 September, effectively repudiating the previous ceasefire agreement and opening the way for the separatists to launch a new offensive. The action, in which Russian commanders were suspected to have aided to the attackers, also resulted in a significant deterioration of the Georgian-Russian relations. Previously, the Russian military offered protection to the retreating Abkhaz detachments during the summer 1992 Georgian offensive. In November 1992, the Russian Air Force conducted heavy air strikes against the villages and towns in Abkhazia predominantly populated by Georgians. In response, the Georgian Defense Ministry accused Russia for the first time in public of preparing a war against Georgia in Abkhazia. This led to the Georgian attacks on targets under Russian and Abkhaz control and the retaliation from the Russian forces.

Russia's attitude began to tilt further to the Abkhaz side, after a Russian MI-8 helicopter (reportedly carrying humanitarian aid) was brought down by Georgian forces on 27 October, which triggered retaliation from Russian forces. On 14 December 1992, the Russian military suffered the loss of another military helicopter, carrying evacuees from Tkvarcheli, with reports of 52 to 64 resulting deaths (including 25 children). Although Georgian authorities denied any responsibility, many believed the helicopter was shot down by the Georgian forces. On 16 December, the government of Georgia requested the Russians to evacuate their nationals from Abkhazia via other routes, foremost the Black Sea, but also to limit the number of missions flown from Gudauta, the main Russian air base in the area. Georgia claimed that Russia used the humanitarian airlift as a pretext to send equipment and mercenaries to the Abkhaz side, and protested the frequent violations of Georgian airspace by Russian planes. This incident "raised the level of general malevolence in the war and catalyzed more concerted Russian military intervention on the Abkhaz side." The town of Tkvarcheli had been besieged by Georgian forces and its population (mostly Abkhaz, Georgians and Russians) suffered a severe humanitarian crisis. Russian military helicopters supplied the city with food and medicine and mobilized Russian-trained fighters to defend the city.

The Human Rights Watch states: "Although the Russian government continued to declare itself officially neutral in the war, parts of Russian public opinion and a significant group in the parliament, primarily Russian nationalists, who had never been favourably disposed toward the Georgians, began to tilt toward the Abkhaz at least by December." During this period the Abkhaz side obtained a large number of armor, tanks (T-72 and T-80) and heavy artillery. The question remains whether there were specific orders concerning the transfer of weapons to Abkhaz side and if so, whom they were issued by. Russian border guards allowed the Chechen fighters led by Shamil Basayev to cross into Abkhazia or at least did nothing to prevent them from arriving in the conflict zone.

On 31 December 1992, talks between the Russian defence minister Pavel Grachev and Georgian defence minister Tengiz Kitovani failed to resolve the deadlock between Russia and Georgia.

A Russian Su-27 was shot down by Georgian forces near Gudauta on 19 March 1993. This incident caused significant controversy, as the aircraft was bombing the Georgian civilian sites and it was flown by a Russian pilot. However, Russian Defence Minister Pavel Grachev officially denied the Russian involvement and terror bombing, instead claiming that the air strike was conducted by the Georgian Su-25s painted with Russian markings and that Georgians were bombing themselves. A United Nations military observer was invited to inspect the downed plane and the dead pilot, confirming the Georgian version. The UN military observer affirmed that the plane was indeed an advanced aircraft belonging to Russia and that the pilot's papers identified him as a major in the Russian Air Force. However, the observer said that he could not verify that the pilot was operating under the instructions of the Russian Defence Ministry: "We need to see orders, written orders, and we need to see the pilots receive them, get in their planes, take off, bomb and strafe and then return to base to fill out mission completion forms. We are never going to get all that", said the UN source.

The Russian journalist Dmitry Kholodov, who has witnessed the Russian bombardment of Georgian-held Sukhumi, wrote a couple of compiling reports with detailed description of humanitarian catastrophe:

"The shelling of Sukhumi by Russians is the most disgusting thing in this war. All the residents of Sukhumi remember the first shelling. It took place on 2 December 1992. The first rocket fell on Peace Street. They struck at crowded places. The next strategic target was the town market, which was hit with great precision. Eighteen people were killed that day. There were always lots of people in the market."

Kholodov also reported on the Russian volunteers fighting on the separatist side:

"Russians, too, are fighting there. We often heard from Georgian guards how Russian mercenaries were attacking: It's a blood-curdling sight – they have helmets and firm, bullet-proof jackets on and their legs are armored as well. They advance with their heads bent down, like robots ready to kill. There is no use shooting at them. No tanks are needed, they are followed by the Abkhaz behind."

On 25 February, the Georgian Parliament appealed to the UN, European Council and Supreme Soviet of the Russian Federation, demanding the withdrawal of Russian forces from Abkhazia and stating that Russia waged "an undeclared war" against Georgia.

On 5 April 1993, two Russian Su-25 warplanes, operating alongside separatist forces, attacked Georgian howitzer and mortar positions near Sukhumi. Russian commanders claimed that the raids were carried out in response to the alleged shelling of a Russian military laboratory in Eshera by Georgian artillery. Russia had declared an air exclusion zone over the facility prior to the alleged attack, and the allegation that Georgian forces had shelled the laboratory was supported by the Abkhazian parliament. Georgian officials, however, argued that Abkhaz forces had been allowed to position their artillery batteries next to the laboratory as cover and that Georgian forces had targeted those positions rather than the facility itself. The Russian Ministry of Defence maintained that the Russian air strikes targeted unpopulated areas, while the Georgian Ministry of Defence stated that the bombs struck the city, resulting in civilian casualties.

Georgian Parliament adopted another resolution on 28 April 1993, which openly blamed Russia in political facilitation of ethnic cleansing and genocide against Georgians.

There was a significant controversy surrounding the amphibious assault force which landed in the Georgian rear in July 1993 to support the offensive conducted by the Abkhaz forces. According to Abkhaz public-political figure Aslan Kobakhia, the landing force was entirely made up of volunteers. However, according to Georgian lieutenant general Guram Nikolaishvili, the landing force largely consisted of Russians and Cossacks, especially of Russian soldiers from Crimea and Moldova. Russian General Alexander Lebed was the one who was tasked with assembling the troops for the landing force, and his brother was commanding the 14th Russian army in Moldova at that time, which was also involved in the fighting on the separatist side in the Transnistria War. According to Nikolaishvili, many of these Russian troops were demobilized or on vacation so that the Russian side could claim later that they were fighting in Abkhazia on their own initiative during the transfer of 150 dead bodies of these fighters to Russia.

On 27 July 1993, Georgia and Abkhaz separatists signed a Russian-brokered ceasefire agreement in Russian town of Sochi to end the conflict. It entailed the gradual demilitarisation of the conflict zone. The agreement banned the use of aircraft, artillery and naval vessels in the conflict zone as well as prohibiting the introduction of new troops or ammunition into Abkhazia. Russia was a guarantor of ceasefire and on 29 July Russian troops arrived to Abkhazia to separate sides, being stationed in and around Georgian-held Sukhumi. However, the ceasefire agreement proved to be short-lived, as the Abkhaz forces launched another offensive in September 1993.

Russian policy during the final battle for Sukhumi in September 1993, immediately, after the breach of the ceasefire by the Abkhaz forces, appeared to follow several lines. Russian officials condemned the attack, issued calls to Abkhaz forces to cease the offensive and its accompanying human rights violations and cut off electricity and telephone service to parts of Abkhazia in September 1993. Russia also supported resolutions in the United Nations Security Council condemning Abkhaz forces for breaching the ceasefire.

At the same time, the Russian government criticized the Georgian government for refusing, once the attack was underway, to negotiate. As the Human Rights Watch report notes, "it is doubtful, however that Russian forces in or near Abkhazia were as surprised as the Russian government seemed to be. Initiating an offensive as large as the one undertaken, in three different directions at once, must have required extensive movement of forces and resupply during the days leading up to it." Russian forces on the Georgian-Abkhaz border, who were supposed to police the ceasefire, made no attempt to forestall the attack. The Abkhaz weapons were stored near the front per ceasefire agreement but were returned to the Abkhaz by the Russians once hostilities restarted. Ataman Nikolay Pusko, a notable commander of some 1,500 Cossack volunteers fighting against Georgians in Abkhazia, later claimed that his sotnia was the first to enter Sukhumi. Pusko and two other Cossack atamans in Abkhazia, Mikhail Vasiliyev and Valery Goloborodko, all died in unclear circumstances from 1993 to 1994.

There was an apparent disagreement between the Russian Foreign Ministry and the Defence Ministry over handling the conflict. The Foreign Ministry took the lead by imposing economic sanctions on Abkhazia and supporting the UN resolution. Russian Foreign Minister Andrei Kozyrev described the South Caucasus as a "region of vital interests" for Russia, but he also noted that the dismemberment of Georgia would set a "dangerous precedent". On the other hand, the Defence Minister Pavel Grachev withdrew his initial offer to send Russian troops as peacekeepers to stop the fighting, in a transparent support for Abkhaz attempts to capture Sukhumi, and instead called Georgians to withdraw. During the negotiations with the Georgian side, he linked the issue of establishing the peace in Abkhazia with Georgia accepting the presence of Russian military bases in Georgia. The Russian military units on spot meanwhile assisted the Abkhaz forces in their offensive.

In a Time magazine article published on 4 October 1993, Georgians said Russian Army officers provided Abkhazian separatists, at the beginning using mere hunting rifles and shotguns, with sophisticated weapons like BM-21 multiple rocket launchers and Sukhoi SU-25 jet aircraft, plus battlefield intelligence.

The failure to stop an Abkhaz offensive and the fall of Sukhumi discredeted Russia as a neutral peacekeeper internationally.

The Georgian defeat in the War in Abkhazia helped Russia to compel Georgia to concede on Russian demands. The weakness of the government forces in aftermath of this defeat led to Zviad Gamsakhurdia launching his offensive in October 1993 to retake power from Eduard Shevardnadze. This finally pushed Shevardnadze to reluctantly accept the Russian demands regarding placing the Russian military bases in the country and the Georgian accession to the Russian-led Commonwealth of Independent States in exchange for Russian military support in the civil war. Shevardnadze also agreed on placing Russian peacekeeping force in Abkhazia. The Russian involvement in the Georgian civil war ensued the defeat of Gamsakhurdia and Shevardnadze's victory.

Scholars attribute the Abkhaz separatist victory in the conflict largely to external involvement, particularly assistance from the Russian military and the Confederation of Mountain Peoples of the Caucasus.

=== Humanitarian actions ===
In the beginning of the conflict (August 1992), Russia evacuated many people from Abkhazian resorts by means of Black Sea fleet and Russian Air Force. As the war progressed, Russia began to supply humanitarian aid to both sides, it also brokered numerous agreements concerning the exchange of prisoners of war. In the course of the war, Russian humanitarian efforts were chiefly focused on the town of Tkvarcheli, which had large ethnic Russian population and was besieged by the Georgian forces. The landmines installed along the mountain highway to this town made Russian helicopters the only safe means of transportation into it. However, Russian navy also evacuated tens of thousands of Georgian civilians, after the fall of Gagra (October 1992) and Sukhumi (September 1993) to the separatist forces.

== Human rights abuses ==
The violations accompanied by atrocities occurred on both sides with Abkhazians displaced from Georgian-held territory and vice versa. Many human rights abuses, principally looting, pillage and other outlaw acts, along with hostage-taking and other violations of humanitarian law, were committed by all sides throughout Abkhazia.

After beginning of the war on 14 August 1992, the Abkhaz separatists and North Caucasian terrorists in Gudauta committed various human rights abuses against ethnic Georgians.

According to Catherine Dale from United Nations High Commissioner for Refugees:

In a former tourist camp in Kutaisi, a large gathering of displaced people tell of the "common practice" called the "Italian necktie", in which the tongue is cut out of the throat and tied around the neck. A woman tells of a man being forced to rape his teenage daughter, and of Abkhaz soldiers having sex with dead bodies. A man tells how in Gudauta, Abkhaz killed small children and then cut off their heads to play football with them. These themes are repeated in many separate accounts.

After taking Sukhumi, Georgian forces (including Mkhedrioni paramilitaries) engaged in "vicious, ethnically based pillage, looting, assault and murder." In addition to the looting, Abkhaz cultural monuments were destroyed in a manner that, according to some reports, suggested deliberate targeting. University buildings were destroyed and museums and other cultural collections broken up. The irreplaceable Abkhaz national archives were burned by Georgian troops. Reportedly, local firefighters didn't attempt to douse the blaze. A family of Abkhaz refugees from Sukhumi claimed that drunken Georgian troops broke into their apartment firing automatic weapons, and telling them "to leave Sukhumi forever, because Sukhumi is Georgian." According to the family, the Georgian soldiers stole jewelry, assaulted the husband, and then threw them all out into the street. The same witnesses reported seeing dead Abkhaz civilians, including women and elderly people, scattered in the streets, even though the fighting had ended days before.

With the Abkhaz conquest of Gagra, those ethnic Georgians who remained in the district were forcibly expelled, and a total of 429 were killed. One Georgian woman recalled watching her husband being tortured and buried alive:

My husband Sergo was dragged and tied to a tree. An Abkhaz woman named Zoya Tsvizba brought a tray with lots of salt on it. She took a knife and started to inflict wounds on my husband. She then threw salt onto my husbands exposed wounds. They tortured him like that for ten minutes. They then forced a young Georgian boy (they killed him after that) to dig a hole with a tractor. They placed my husband in this hole and buried him alive. The only thing I remember him saying, before he was covered with the gravel and sand, was: 'Dali, take care of the kids!'

According to the newspaper "Free Georgia", Chechens and other northern Caucasians rounded up captured soldiers and civilians at the local stadium and executed them. Some were decapitated and their heads were used to play football. After a commission composed of Russian deputies, (as well as a commission of Michael van Praag) went to Gagra and did not confirm the fact of such a brutal attitude towards the Georgians, this newspaper admitted in November that "the episode at the stadium was not confirmed".

After the Abkhaz capture of Sukhumi, one of the largest massacres of the war was committed against the remaining and trapped Georgian civilians in the city.

The 1994 U.S. State Department Country Reports also describes scenes of massive human rights abuse:

The Abkhaz separatist forces committed widespread atrocities against the Georgian civilian population, killing many women, children and elderly, capturing some as hostages and torturing others.... They also killed large numbers of Georgian civilians, who remained behind in Abkhaz-seized territory....

The separatists launched a reign of terror against the majority Georgian population, although other nationalities also suffered. Chechens and other north Caucasians from the Russian Federation reportedly joined local Abkhaz troops in the commission of atrocities.... Those fleeing Abkhazia made highly credible claims of atrocities, including the killing of civilians without regard for age or sex. Corpses recovered from Abkhaz-held territory showed signs of extensive torture (the evidence available to Human Rights Watch supports the U.S. State Department's findings).

When the Abkhazians entered my house, they took me and my seven-year old son outside. After forcing us to our knees, they took my son and shot him right in front of me. After, they grabbed me by hair and took me to the nearby well. An Abkhazian soldier forced me to look down that well, there I saw three younger man and couple of elderly women, who were standing soaking in the water naked. They were screaming and crying, while the Abkhazians were dumping dead corpses on them. They then threw a grenade there and placed more people inside. I was forced again to my knees in front of the dead corpses. One of the soldiers took his knife and took the eye out from one of the dead near me. Then he started to rub my lips and face with that decapitated eye. I could not take it any longer and fainted. They left me there in pile of corpses.

=== Ethnic cleansing of Georgians in Abkhazia ===
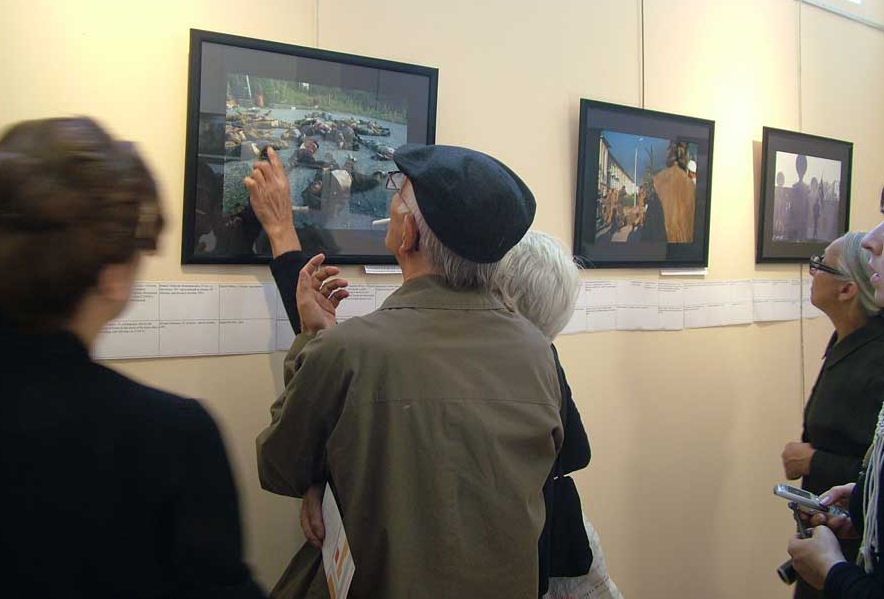
The 12th anniversary of ethnic cleansing in Abkhazia, which was held in Tbilisi in 2005. One of the visitors of the gallery recognized her dead son on the photograph

The Abkhaz side has been singled out as responsible for deliberate, as opposed to consequential, displacement carried out as a military, strategic and political objective in itself, resulting in a use of the term ethnic cleansing as a characterization for these actions. As a result of the war, around 250,000 people (mainly Georgians) fled from or were forced out of Abkhazia.

The ethnic cleansing and massacres of Georgians has been officially recognized by the Organization for Security and Co-operation in Europe (OSCE) conventions in 1994, 1996 and again in 1997 during the Budapest, Istanbul and Lisbon summits and condemned the "perpetrators of war crimes committed during the conflict". On 15 May 2008, the UN General Assembly adopted (by 14 votes to 11, with 105 abstentions) a resolution A/RES/62/249 in which it "Emphasizes the importance of preserving the property rights of refugees and internally displaced persons from Abkhazia, Georgia, including victims of reported "ethnic cleansing", and calls upon all Member States to deter persons under their jurisdiction from obtaining property within the territory of Abkhazia, Georgia in violation of the rights of returnees".

The former resident of Ochamchire district, Leila Goletiani, who was taken prisoner by Abkhaz separatists, gave the following account of her captivity to the Russian film director Andrei Nekrasov:

I lived in Abkhazia 15 years ago, in the small town of Akhaldaba, Ochamchire district. Abkhaz attacked our village on 16 September 1993. It was impossible to hide anywhere from the bullets which rained down on us. ... The Russian Cossacks approached me and started to beat me. One of these Russian Cossacks approached me and asked me if I have ever had sex with a Cossack. He grabbed me and tried to rip off my clothes, after which I started to resist but they hit my head on the ground and started to beat me with AK-47 butts. While hitting me all over my body, they yelled, "We will kill you, but we will do so slowly." Then they took me to an Abkhaz school where they kept Georgian civilian prisoners. There were only Georgians there, women, children and men. There were some women who were pregnant, and children of different ages. The Battalion of Cossacks kept coming there regularly. They took young girls and children and raped them systematically. These were children aged 10, 12, 13, and 14. They especially targeted children. One of the girls there was 8 years old. She was taken by different groups of these Cossacks and was raped numerous times. I don't know how she managed to survive after so many rapes but I don't want to mention her name in order to protect her identity. They also took women but later they started to take elderly women. They raped these elderly women in the way which I don't want to go into detail ... it was horrific.

According to the U.S. Department of State's Country Report on Human Rights Practices 1993, "The Abkhazians also accused the Georgians of human rights violations, including an 'ethnic cleansing' campaign. There is little evidence to support allegations of ethnic cleansing, although it is probable that some ethnic Abkhazians were forced to move from Georgian-held territory in isolated instances."

=== Georgian exodus from Abkhazia ===
After the fall of Sukhumi in 1993 thousands of Georgian refugees started to flee Gali, Ochamchira and the Sukhumi regions. The plight of refugees became deadly due to snow and cold on the pathway in the Kodori Gorge. Georgian authorities were unable to evacuate all remaining civilians (previously many people were evacuated from Sukhumi by the Russian navy and by the Ukrainian air forces.) The refugees started to move in through the Kodori Gorge on foot, bypassing the Gali region, which was blocked by advancing Abkhaz separatist forces. The crossing of the Kodori Gorge on foot became another death trap for the fleeing IDPs. Most of the people who didn't survive the crossing died of cold and starvation. The survivors who reached the Svan mountains were attacked and robbed by local criminal groups. One of the survivors recalls the crossing:

They were killing everyone who was Georgian. Every road was blocked. There was only one way out, through the mountains. It was terrible and horrific, nobody knew where it ended or what would happen on the way. There were children, women and elderly people. Everyone was marching not knowing where they are headed. We were cold, hungry, there was no water.... We marched the whole day. By the end of the day we were tired and could not go on. To rest, it meant to die, so we marched and marched. Some woman near me didn't make it, she had fallen dead. As we marched, we saw people frozen and dead, they apparently stopped for a break and it was their end. The path never ended, it seemed that we would die at any time. One young girl, who marched beside me all the way from Sukhumi was pregnant. She delivered her baby in the mountains. The child died on the third day of our deadly march. She separated from us and we never saw her again. Finally we made it into the Svan villages. Only women and children were allowed in their huts. Buses came later on that day. We were then taken to Zugdidi.

According to the United States State Department Commission on Foreign Relations and International Relations, 104th Cong., 1st Sess., Country Reports on Human Rights Practices for 1994, at 815 (Joint Comm. Print 1995), the victorious Abkhaz separatists "moved through captured towns with prepared lists and addresses of ethnic Georgians, plundered and burned homes and executed designated civilians." Georgians were specifically targeted, but all non-Abkhaz suffered.

== Results ==
Georgia effectively lost control over Abkhazia and the latter established itself as a de facto independent territory. The relations between Russia and Abkhazia improved in the late 1990s and the economic blockade of Abkhazia was lifted. The laws were also passed allowing other countries to become part of Russian Federation, which was interpreted by some as an offer to Abkhazia and other unrecognised countries of the former Soviet Union.

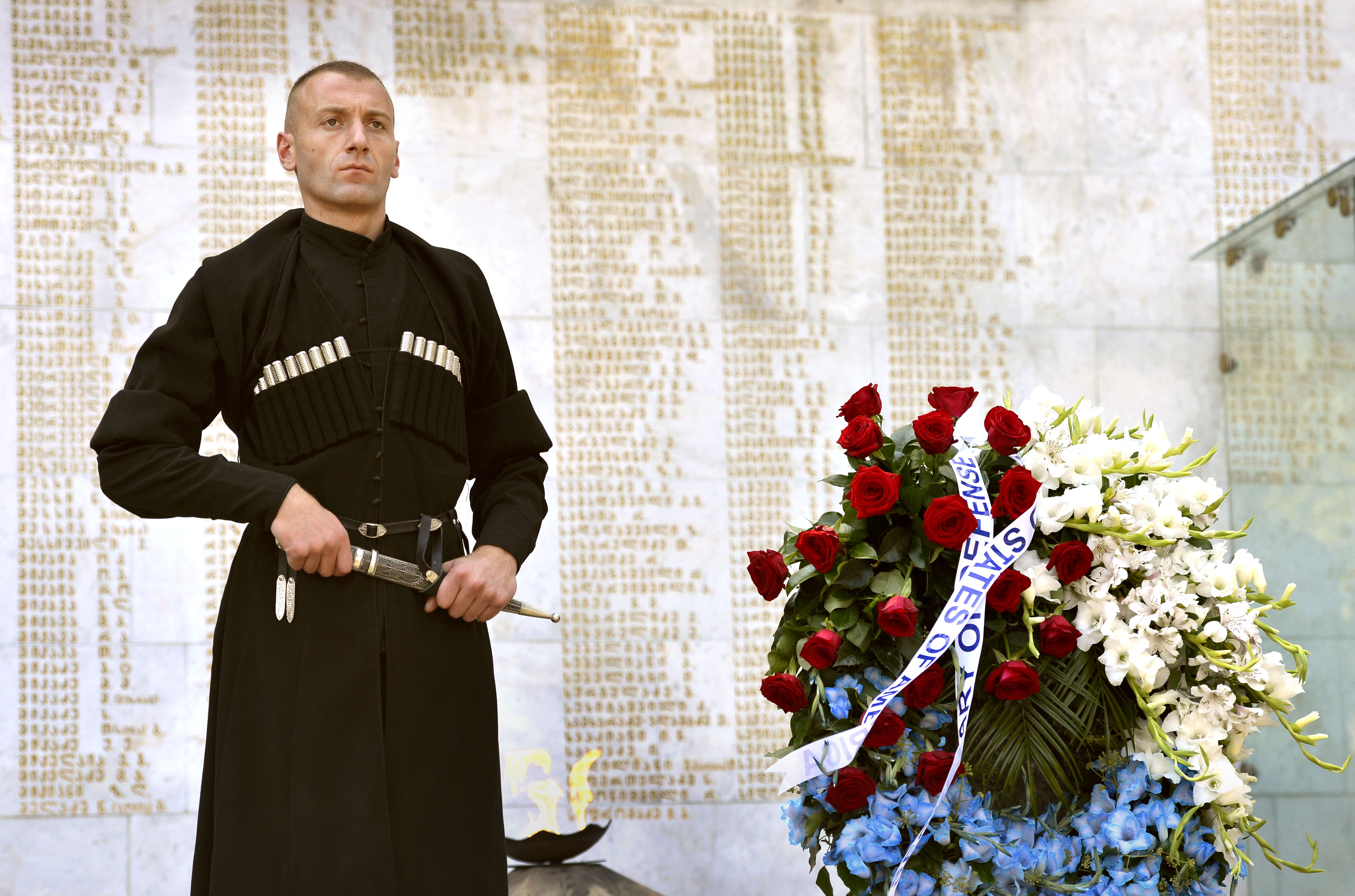
"Monument to the heroes, who fell fighting for the territorial integrity of Georgia", Tbilisi

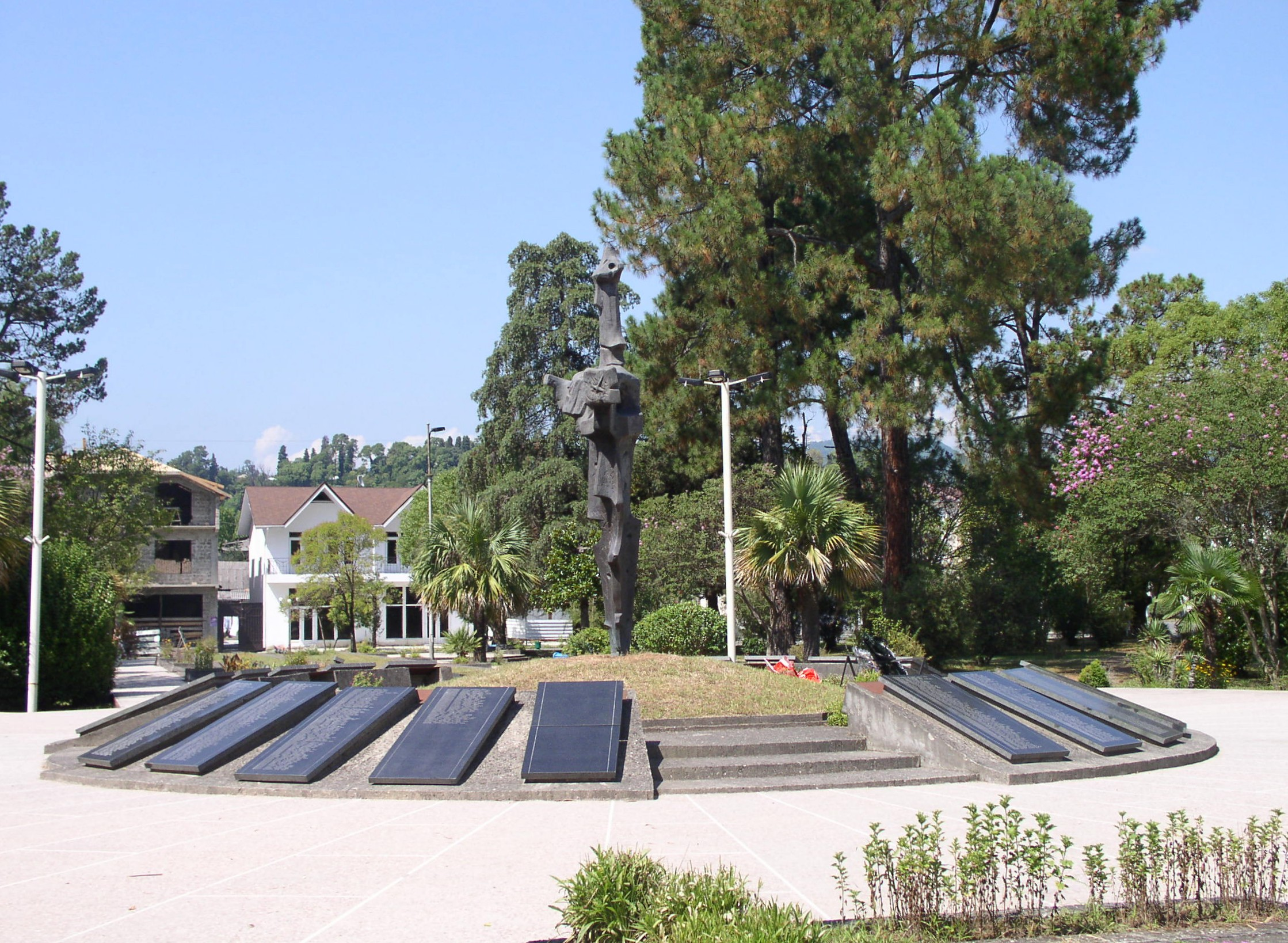
The names of Abkhaz troops and their allies killed in action during the war are inscribed on the "Alley of Glory" monument in Sukhumi

Georgia claimed that Russian army and intelligence contributed decisively to the Georgian defeat in the Abkhazian war and considered this conflict (along with the Georgian Civil War and Georgian–Ossetian War) as one of Russia's attempt of restoring its influence in the post-Soviet area.

At the end of the war, the Russian Foreign Minister Andrey Kozyrev said at the UN General Assembly: "Russia realizes that no international organization or group of states can replace our peacekeeping efforts in this specific post-Soviet space."

A wide array of opinions on Russian policy with respect to Georgia and Abkhazia was expressed in the Russian media and parliament in the 1990s.

Oxford Professor S.N. MacFarlane, notes on the issue of Russian mediation in Abkhazia:

"Notably, it is clear that Russian policy makers are uncomfortable with the idea of a prominent role being granted to external actors in dealing with conflict in the former Soviet space. More recently, this has been extended specifically to the activities of international organisations in the management of conflict. As one group of influential Russian foreign policy commentators and policy makers put it in May 1996, it is definitely not in Russia's interest to see outside mediation and peacekeeping operations on the territory of the former Soviet Union.
"Russia has clear hegemonic aspirations in the former Soviet space. Although a wide array of opinions is expressed on Russian policy in the newly independent states in the media and in parliament, a dominant consensus appears to have emerged among foreign policy influentials on the need for active presence and influence in the area. Such views have been widely expressed in official statements, influential statements by independent policy groups and by advisers to the president, influential political figures and the president himself. The hegemonic component of Russian policy in the near abroad is evident in its efforts to restore Russian control over the external borders of the former Soviet Union, to reassume control over the Soviet air defence network, to obtain agreements on basing Russian forces in the non-Russian republics and by its obvious sensitivity to external military presences (including multilateral ones) on the soil of the former Soviet Union. To judge from Russian policy on Caspian Sea and Central Asian energy development, it extends beyond the political/security realm and into the economic one. Its sources are diverse and include the Russian imperial hangover, but more practically the fate of the Russian diaspora, the lack of developed defences along the borders of the Russian Federation proper, concern over Islam and discomfort with the spill-over effects of instability in the other republics."

On 28 August 2006, Senator Richard Lugar, then visiting Georgia's capital Tbilisi, joined the Georgian politicians in criticism of the Russian peacekeeping mission, stating that "the U.S. administration supports the Georgian government's insistence on the withdrawal of Russian peacekeepers from the conflict zones in Abkhazia and the Tskhinvali district."

=== Conflict mediation ===
Map of the Upper Kodori Valley in Abkhazia remaining under Georgian control after the war

During the war the peace mediation was done first by Russia and second by the UN. From 1993 onwards, the pressure for a peace settlement mounted from UN, Russia and the then Group of Friends of Georgia (Russia, U.S., France, Germany and UK). In December 1993, an official ceasefire was signed by Georgian and Abkhaz leaders under the aegis of the UN and with Russia as intermediary. The venues shifted from Geneva to New York and finally to Moscow. On 4 April 1994 the "declaration on measures for a political settlement of the Georgian-Abkhazian conflict" was signed in Moscow. Instead of the deployment of a traditional UN peacekeeping force, the deployment of a CIS, mainly Russian peacekeeping forces, was agreed in Moscow on 14 May 1994.

In June 1994, CIS peacekeeping forces comprising only the Russian soldiers were deployed along the administrative border between Abkhazia and the remaining Georgia. The UN mission (UNOMIG) also arrived. However, these could not prevent further atrocities against the Georgians in the following years (around 1,500 deaths have been reported by the Georgian government in the post-war period). On 14 September 1994, Abkhaz leaders appeared on local TV to demand that all ethnic Georgians depart from the region by 27 September (the anniversary of the capture of Sukhumi). On 30 November 1994, Abkhazia promulgated a new constitution declaring independence of the breakaway region. However, none of the foreign governments recognised this. On 15 December 1994, the US State Department condemned Abkhazia's declaration of independence. On 21 March 1995, The United Nations High Commissioner for Refugees accused Abkhaz militias of torturing and murdering dozens of returning ethnic Georgian refugees in Gali District.

==== UN involvement ====
The United Nations Observer Mission in Georgia (UNOMIG) was established in 1993 to monitor the ceasefire and later expanded to observe the operation of the CIS peacekeeping forces. The Organization for Security in Europe (OSCE) and other international organizations are also involved in monitoring developments. Negotiations toward a permanent peace settlement have made little progress, but the Georgian and Abkhaz governments have agreed to limit the size of their military forces and extend the authorization for UNOMIG. Meanwhile, Georgian refugees maintain a government in exile.

== Weapons ==
Both sides during conflict were mainly equipped with Soviet made weaponry, though Georgian forces had much more heavy weapons at the start of war, Abkhaz forces acquired many advanced weapons from Russia and at the end of war had decisive edge in weaponry, employing many SAM and MANPAT Systems, meanwhile Georgian forces had problems with supplying needed weapons and equipment to forces in Abkhazia, mainly because there was no foreign support and difficulties acquiring weapons from abroad.

Type	Georgian Forces	Abkhaz & North Caucasian Forces
AFVs	T-55, T-55AM2	T-54/T-55, T-72M, T-72B
APCs/IFVs	BTR-152, BTR-60, BTR-70, BTR-80, BRDM-2, MT-LB, BMP-1, BMP-2	BTR-70, BTR-80, BMP-1, BMP-2, BMP-2D, BTR-D, BMD-1, BMD-2, BRDM-2
Artillery	D-30 (2A18) Howitzer, 152 mm towed gun-howitzer M1955 (D-20), 2S1 Gvozdika, 2S3 Akatsiya, BM-21, BM-27	D-30 (2A18) Howitzer, 152 mm howitzer 2A65, 152 mm gun 2A36, 2S1 Gvozdika, 2S3 Akatsiya, 2S19 Msta, 2S9 Nona, BM-21, BM-27
Aircraft	Sukhoi Su-25, Sukhoi Su-25UB, Yakovlev Yak-52, An-2 MiG-21UM	Mikoyan MiG-29, Sukhoi Su-27, Sukhoi Su-25, Sukhoi Su-22M3, Aero L-39 Albatros, Yakovlev Yak-52
Helicopters	Mil Mi-24, Mil Mi-8,	Mil Mi-24, Mil Mi-8, Mil Mi-17, Mil Mi-26, Mil Mi-6
AAW	SA-3 Goa, SA-2 Guideline, ZU-23-2, AZP S-60, 9K32 Strela-2, 9K34 Strela-3	SA-3 Goa, 9K35 Strela-10, Buk missile system, 2K22 Tunguska, ZSU-23-4, ZU-23-2, AZP S-60, 9K32 Strela-2, 9K34 Strela-3, 9K38 Igla
Anti-tank weapons	RPG-7, RPG-18, RPG-22, SPG-9, 9M14 Malyutka	RPG-7, RPG-16, RPG-18, RPG-22, RPG-26, SPG-9, 9K111 Fagot, 9M113 Konkurs, 9K115 Metis
Infantry weapons	Mosin–Nagant, AK-47, AKM, AK-74, PM md. 63, PA md. 86, Norinco CQ, RPK, RPK-74, DP-28, PK machine gun, SVD, PPSh-41, MP-40, TT-33, Makarov PM, Stechkin APS, Nagant M1895, F1 grenade, RGD-5 grenade, RPG-43 anti-tank grenade, RKG-3 anti-tank grenade, DShK, NSV machine gun	SKS, AK-47, AKM, AK-74, AK-74M, RPK, RPK-74, RPD machine gun, PK machine gun, SVD, PPSh-41, TT-33, Makarov PM, Stechkin APS, PSM pistol, F1 grenade, RGD-5 grenade, RGN hand grenade, RKG-3 anti-tank grenade, DShK, NSV machine gun

== See also ==
- Transair Georgia airliner shootdowns
- Politics of Abkhazia
- Russian-Circassian War
- Russo-Georgian War
- Timeline of the War in Abkhazia (1992–93)
- Operation Golden Fleece

== Sources ==
- Lukic, Renéo; Lynch, Allen (1996). "After empire: Russia and its neighbours in the CIS and East—Central Europe". Europe from the Balkans to the Urals: The Disintegration of Yugoslavia and the Soviet Union. SIPRI.
- Bennett, Andrew (1999). Condemned to repetition?: the rise, fall, and reprise of Soviet-Russian military interventionism, 1973-1996. MIT Press. ISBN 9780262522571.
- Chervonnaya, Svetlana (1994). Conflict in the Caucasus: Georgia, Abkhazia and the Russian Shadow. Translated by Ariane Chanturia. Glastonbury, United Kingdom: Gothic Image Publications. ISBN 978-0-90-636230-3.
- Blair, Heather. Ethnic Conflict as a Tool of Outside Influence: An Examination of Abkhazia and Kosovo., Young Experts' Think Tank (YETT)
- McCallion, Amy. Abkhazian Separatism, Young Experts' Think Tank (YETT)
- Lynch, Dov, The Conflict in Abkhazia: Dilemmas in Russian 'Peacekeeping' Policy. Royal Institute of International Affairs, February 1998.
- MacFarlane, S., N., "On the front lines in the near abroad: the CIS and the OSCE in Georgia' s civil wars", Third World Quarterly, Vol 18, No 3, pp 509– 525, 1997.
- Marshania L., Tragedy of Abkhazia Moscow, 1996
- Nejad, Kayhan A. "Confederal Nationalism and the Abkhaz-Georgian Conflict, 1989-94", Kritika: Explorations in Russian and Eurasian History, Vol 26, No 2, pp 381-410, 2025.
- Payin, Emil; Azrael, Jeremy R. (1996). U.S. and Russian Policymaking with Respect to the Use of Force. RAND. ISBN 9780833024688.
- Slider, Darrell (1997). "Democratization in Georgia". In Parrott, Bruce; Dawisha, Karen (eds.). Conflict, Cleavage, and Change in Central Asia and the Caucasus. Cambridge University Press.
- Shesterinina, Anastasia. Mobilizing in Uncertainty: Collective Identities and War in Abkhazia. Cornell University Press, 2021.
- White Book of Abkhazia. 1992–1993 Documents, Materials, Evidences. Moscow, 1993.
- Kocaman, Ömer (2008). "Russia's Relations with Georgia within the Context of the Russian National Interests towards the South Caucasus in the Post-Soviet Era: 1992-2005" (PDF). Uluslararası Stratejik Araştırmalar Kurumu (1).
- Belkin, Aaron. United We Stand?; Divide-and-Conquer Politics and the Logic of International Hostility. State University of New York Press, 2005.
- Bremmer, Ian; Taras, Ray (1997). New States, New Politics: Building the Post-Soviet Nations. Cambridge University Press. ISBN 9780521571012.
- Wheatley, Jonathan (2005). Georgia from National Awakening to Rose Revolution. Ashgate Publishing. ISBN 9780754645030.
- Coppieters, Bruno; Nodia, Ghia (1998). Georgians and Abkhazians: the search for a peace settlement. BIOst.
- Kizilbuga, Esra (2006). Russian involvement in the Abkhaz-Georgian conflict. Middle East Technical University.
- Cornell, Svante E. (2005). Small Nations and Great Powers. Taylor & Francis. ISBN 9781135796693.
- Papaskiri, Zurab (2007). ნარკვევები თანამედროვე აფხაზეთის ისტორიული წარსულიდან [Findings from the Historical Past of Modern Abkhazia] (in Georgian). Vol. 2. Tbilisi: Sukhumi Branch of Tbilisi State University.
- Bozkurt, Giray Saynur (2014). Blue Black Sea: New Dimensions of History, Security, Politics, Strategy, Energy and Economy. Cambridge Scholars Publishing. ISBN 9781443864756.
