= Tamishi =

Tamishi ტამიში
- Village
- Location of the village Tamishi (Abkhazia)
- Coordinates: 42°47′23″N 41°22′19″E
- Country: Georgia
- Partially recognized independent country: Abkhazia
- District: Ochamchira
- Elevation: 10 m (33 ft)

Population (2011)
  - Total: 549
- Time zone: UTC+3 (MSK)

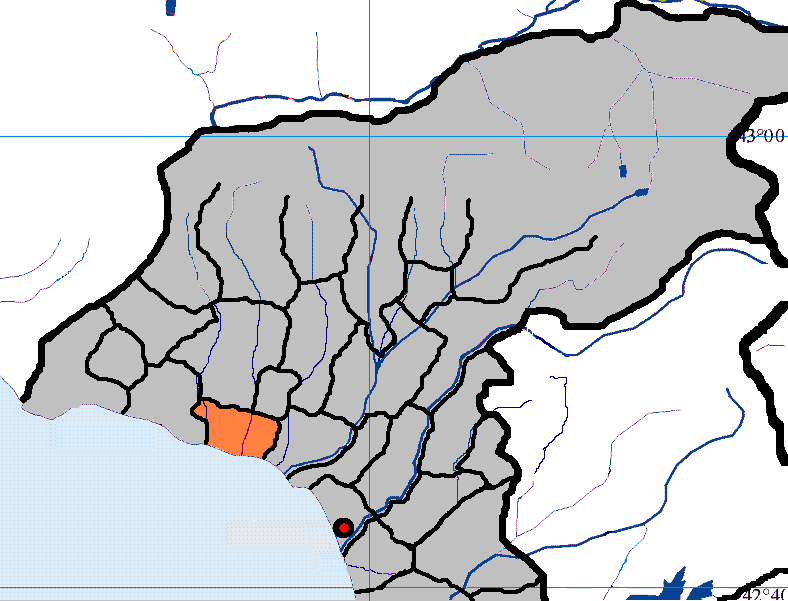
Taishi village in Ochamchira district

Tamishi or Tamysh (Georgian: ტამიში; Abkhaz: Тамшь) is a village in the Ochamchira District in Abkhazia, Georgia. It is located on the Black Sea coast, at the right side of Dghamshi river. Its altitude above sea level is around 10 m, the distance to Ochamchire is 14 km.

At the time of the 2011 Abkhaz Census Tamishi/Tamysh had a population of 549. Of these 88.5% were Abkhaz, Georgians 4.2%, 3.6% Russians and 1.1% Armenian.

The village was a site of the major battle from the 2nd of July to the 10th of July 1993 during the War in Abkhazia.This was due to Tamishi/Tamysh having a strategic location of being located on the only road/railway connecting Ochamchire to Sukhumi.

Aslan Bzhania the fifth President of Abkhazia was born in Tamishi/Tamysh.

== See also ==
- Ochamchire District
- Tamishi landing

== Sources ==
- Georgian Soviet Encyclopedia, Volume 9, p. 651, Tbilisi, 1985.
