= List of monuments in Gagra Municipality =

The monuments in the Gagra Municipality is a group of cultural heritage sites registered by the government of Georgia on the territory of a de jure territorial unit, which corresponds to the Gagra District in northwestern Abkhazia. (Note: The political status of Abkhazia is disputed. Having unilaterally declared independence from Georgia in 1992, Abkhazia is formally recognised as an independent state by 5 UN member states (two other states previously recognised it but then withdrew their recognition), while the remainder of the international community recognizes it as de jure Georgian territory. Georgia continues to claim the area as its own territory, designating it as Russian-occupied territory.)

The table lists a monument, its location and dating as well as the status attached to it by the Georgian authorities and the number assigned in the registry by the National Agency for Cultural Heritage Preservation of Georgia, which is available online as a GIS portal. The Agency broadly classifies the heritage sites into three groups: 1) the objects without a status, 2) immovable monuments of cultural heritage, and 3) immovable monuments of national significance.

Object	National Registry number	Date of construction	Location	Status	Image
Alakhadzi church complex	3580	4th-6th centuries	Alakhadzi	Cultural Monument	
Bzyb church	3582	9th century	Bzyb	Cultural Monument	
Pitsunda Cathedral	3583	10th century	Pitsunda	Cultural Monument of National Significance	
Bzyb fortress	3581	8th-10th century	Bzyb	Cultural Monument	
Greek church of Gagra	3576	19th-20th century	Gagra	Cultural Monument	
Gagra church	3574	6th century	Gagra	Cultural Monument of National Significance	
Gagra church ruins (Gagripshi Valley)	3577		Gagra	Cultural Monument	
Gagra church ruins	3579	Middle Ages	Gagra	Cultural Monument	
Gagra tower	3678	Middle Ages	Gagra	Cultural Monument	
Greek church of Gantiadi	3587	Mid-19th century	Gantiadi	Cultural Monument	
Gantiadi Church	3585	Early 6th century	Gantiadi	Cultural Monument of National Significance	
Lidzava Church	3579	Middle Ages	Lidzava	Cultural Monument	
Zhoekvara Castle		Middle Ages	Gagra		
Sulevo monastery	3588	Early Middle Ages	Sulevo	Cultural Monument	

== See also ==
- List of Cultural Heritage Monuments of Georgia
