= List of Cultural Heritage Monuments of Georgia =

A Cultural Heritage Monument (Georgian: კულტურული მემკვიდრეობის ძეგლი) is a designation given by the government of Georgia to an immovable or movable object of material culture with a particular historical or cultural significance, on account of its antiquity, uniqueness, or authenticity.

The Georgian law defines an immovable monument as an object which is attached to and remain on the ground. The monuments which have an outstanding artistic or aesthetic value, are associated with a particularly important historical event, person, or overall national values, are categorized as Immovable Cultural Monuments of National Significance. A monument from this category can be submitted by the Prime Minister of Georgia for the inclusion in the World Heritage Site list.

Lists of cultural heritage monuments by administrative-territorial units
List	Municipality / former district / City	Autonomous republic / provisional region / City
List of monuments in Abasha Municipality	Abasha	Samegrelo-Zemo Svaneti
List of monuments in Adigeni Municipality	Adigeni	Samtskhe–Javakheti
List of monuments in Akhalgori Municipality	Akhalgori	Provisional Administration of South Ossetia
List of monuments in Akhalkalaki Municipality	Akhalkalaki	Samtskhe–Javakheti
List of monuments in Akhaltsikhe Municipality	Akhaltsikhe	Samtskhe–Javakheti
List of monuments in Akhmeta Municipality	Akhmeta	Kakheti
List of monuments in Ambrolauri Municipality	Ambrolauri	Racha-Lechkhumi and Kvemo Svaneti
List of monuments in Aspindza Municipality	Aspindza	Samtskhe–Javakheti
List of monuments in Baghdati Municipality	Baghdati	Imereti
List of monuments in Batumi	Batumi	Batumi
List of monuments in Bolnisi Municipality	Bolnisi	Kvemo Kartli
List of monuments in Borjomi Municipality	Borjomi	Samtskhe–Javakheti
List of monuments in Chiatura Municipality	Chiatura	Imereti
List of monuments in Chkhorotsku Municipality	Chkhorotsku	Samegrelo-Zemo Svaneti
List of monuments in Chokhatauri Municipality	Chokhatauri	Guria
List of monuments in Dedoplistskaro Municipality	Dedoplistskaro	Kakheti
List of monuments in Dmanisi Municipality	Dmanisi	Kvemo Kartli
List of monuments in Dusheti Municipality	Dusheti	Mtskheta-Mtianeti
List of monuments in Eredvi Municipality	Eredvi	Provisional Administration of South Ossetia
List of monuments in Former Java District	Java	Provisional Administration of South Ossetia
List of monuments in Gagra Municipality	Gagra	Abkhazia
List of monuments in Gali Municipality	Gali	Abkhazia
List of monuments in Gardabani Municipality	Gardabani	Kvemo Kartli
List of monuments in Gori Municipality	Gori	Shida Kartli
List of monuments in Gudauta Municipality	Gudauta	Abkhazia
List of monuments in Gulripshi Municipality	Gulripshi	Abkhazia
List of monuments in Gurjaani Municipality	Gurjaani	Kakheti
List of monuments in Kaspi Municipality	Kaspi	Shida Kartli
List of monuments in Kareli Municipality	Kareli	Shida Kartli
List of monuments in Kazbegi Municipality	Kazbegi	Mtskheta-Mtianeti
List of monuments in Keda Municipality	Keda	Adjara
List of monuments in Kharagauli Municipality	Kharagauli	Imereti
List of monuments in Khashuri Municipality	Khashuri	Shida Kartli
List of monuments in Khelvachauri Municipality	Khelvachauri	Adjara
List of monuments in Khulo Municipality	Khulo	Adjara
List of monuments in Khoni Municipality	Khoni	Imereti
List of monuments in Kobuleti Municipality	Kobuleti	Adjara
List of monuments in Kurta Municipality	Kurta	Provisional Administration of South Ossetia
List of monuments in Kutaisi	Kutaisi	Kutaisi
List of monuments in Kvareli Municipality	Kvareli	Kakheti
List of monuments in Lagodekhi Municipality	Lagodekhi	Kakheti
List of monuments in Lanchkhuti Municipality	Lanchkhuti	Guria
List of monuments in Lentekhi Municipality	Lentekhi	Racha-Lechkhumi and Kvemo Svaneti
List of monuments in Marneuli Municipality	Marneuli	Kvemo Kartli
List of monuments in Martvili Municipality	Martvili	Samegrelo-Zemo Svaneti
List of monuments in Mestia Municipality	Mestia	Samegrelo-Zemo Svaneti
List of monuments in Mtskheta Municipality	Mtskheta	Mtskheta-Mtianeti
List of monuments in Ninotsminda Municipality	Ninotsminda	Samtskhe–Javakheti
List of monuments in Ochamchire Municipality	Ochamchire	Abkhazia
List of monuments in Oni Municipality	Oni	Racha-Lechkhumi and Kvemo Svaneti
List of monuments in Ozurgeti Municipality	Ozurgeti	Guria
List of monuments in Poti	Poti	Poti
List of monuments in Rustavi	Rustavi	Rustavi
List of monuments in Sagarejo Municipality	Sagarejo	Kakheti
List of monuments in Samtredia Municipality	Samtredia	Imereti
List of monuments in Sachkhere Municipality	Sachkhere	Imereti
List of monuments in Senaki Municipality	Senaki	Samegrelo-Zemo Svaneti
List of monuments in Shuakhevi Municipality	Shuakhevi	Adjara
List of monuments in Sighnaghi Municipality	Sighnaghi	Kakheti
List of monuments in Sukhumi Municipality	Sukhumi	Abkhazia
List of monuments in Tbilisi	Tbilisi	Tbilisi
List of monuments in Telavi Municipality	Telavi	Kakheti
List of monuments in Terjola Municipality	Terjola	Imereti
List of monuments in Tetritsqaro Municipality	Tetritsqaro	Kvemo Kartli
List of monuments in Tianeti Municipality	Tianeti	Mtskheta-Mtianeti
List of monuments in Tqibuli Municipality	Tqibuli	Imereti
List of monuments in Tsageri Municipality	Tsageri	Racha-Lechkhumi and Kvemo Svaneti
List of monuments in Tsalenjikha Municipality	Tsalenjikha	Samegrelo-Zemo Svaneti
List of monuments in Tsalka Municipality	Tsalka	Kvemo Kartli
List of monuments in Tsqaltubo Municipality	Tsqaltubo	Imereti
List of monuments in Vani Municipality	Vani	Imereti
List of monuments in Zestaponi Municipality	Zestaponi	Imereti
List of monuments in Zugdidi Municipality	Zugdidi	Samegrelo-Zemo Svaneti
List of monuments in Tighva Municipality	Tighva	Provisional Administration of South Ossetia
