= List of monuments in Akhalgori Municipality =

The monuments in the Akhalgori Municipality is a group of cultural heritage sites registered by the government of Georgia on the territory of the de jure Akhalgori Municipality, which has been under the control of South Ossetia, an entity with limited international recognition, since the 2008 Russo-Georgian War. Due to the continued presence of the Russian troops, Georgia, in accordance to its Law on Occupied territories (Article 7.4), holds Russia responsible for the protection of cultural heritage in the area.

The table lists a monument, its location and dating as well as the status attached to it by the Georgian authorities and the number assigned in the registry by the National Agency for Cultural Heritage Preservation of Georgia, which is available online as a GIS portal. The Agency broadly classifies the heritage sites into three groups: 1) the objects without a status, 2) immovable monuments of cultural heritage, and 3) immovable monuments of national significance.

Object	National Registry number	Date of construction	Location	Status	Image
Abramiani Church of Saint George		Middle Ages	Doretkari		
Abramiani Former Church of Saint George		Middle Ages	Premises of Doretkari		
Abrevi Church		Middle Ages	Abrevi		
Ruins of Abrevi Church		Middle Ages	Abrevi		
Abrevi Church of Tedotsminda		Middle Ages	Abrevi		
Roundback Tower of Alaverdi		9th-10th centuries	Chigoiani		
Alaverdi monastery		9th-10th centuries	Chigoiani		
Alevi Church	2309	7th-9th centuries	Premises of Korinta	Cultural Monument of National Significance	
Arbo Church (Tzhortzhokhi)		Middle Ages	Premises of Tzhotzhokhi		
Church with in Armazi		late Middle Ages	Armazi		
Former church with in Armazi		Middle Ages	Armazi		
Akhalgori Church		late Middle Ages	Akhalgori		
Akhalgori Church of Kviratskhoveli		Middle Ages	Akhalgori		
Ruins of Akhalgori Church of Kviratskhoveli		Middle Ages	Akhalgori		
Watchtower of Akhalgori		late Middle Ages	Akhalgori		
Akhalgori Church of Mikel-Gabriel		late Middle Ages	Akhalgori		
Akhalgori Church of the Mother of Jesus'		late Middle Ages	Akhalgori		
Akhalgori Church of Saint George	2288	late Middle Ages	Akhalgori	Cultural Monument	
Akhalgori Church of Saint Marine		early Middle Ages	Akhalgori		
Ruins of Akhaldaba Church		Middle Ages	Akhaldaba		
Ruins of Second Akhaldaba Church		late Middle Ages	Akhaldaba		
Tower of Akhmaji		late Middle Ages	Akhmaji		
Akhmaji Church of the Mother of Jesus'		late Middle Ages	Akhmaji		
Balaani Church		late Middle Ages	Balaani		
Balaani Church of Saint George		late Middle Ages	Balaani		
Balaani Tower of Tsetskhlijvroba		late Middle Ages	Balaani		
Bedzhaantkari Church of Saint George		16th-17th centuries	Bedzhaantkari		
Berijvari Church	2307	10th century	Kitriuli	Cultural Monument	
Ruins of Boselta Church of Archangel		Middle Ages	Boselta		
Boselta Church of Saint George		late Middle Ages	Boselta		
Ruins of Boselta Church of Saint George		late Middle Ages	Boselta		
Boselta Church of the Mother of Jesus'		Middle Ages	Boselta		
Gavazi Church		late Middle Ages	Gavazi		
Ruins of Gavazi Church		late Middle Ages	Gavazi		
Gavazi Church of Kviratskoveli		Middle Ages	Gavazi		
Gavazi monastery of the Mother of Jesus'		late Middle Ages	Gavazi		
Garubani Church of the Mother of Jesus'	2292	High Middle Ages	Garubani	Cultural Monument	
Garueti Church of Saint George		late Middle Ages	Garueti		
Gduleti Church of the Mother of Jesus'		yearly Middle Ages	Gduleti		
The Church of Holy Trinity of Gdu	2293	9th century	Gdu	Cultural Monument	
Gdu Church of Saint George		late Middle Ages	Gdu		
Gezevreti Church		Middle Ages	Gezevreti		
Gezevreti Church of Saint George	2294	High Middle Ages	Gezevreti	Cultural Monument	
Gorijvari Church		late Middle Ages	Akhalgori		
Cave Church of the Mother of Jesus' in Gudita		Middle Ages	Gudita		
Ascension's monastery in Dabakneti		Middle Ages	Dabakneti		
Dabakneti Church		late Middle Ages	Dabakneti		
Dabakneti Church (transitional period)		Transitional period	Dabakneti		
Roundback Tower of Dabakneti		9th-10th centuries	Dabakneti		
Dabakneti Kvelatsminda Church		Middle Ages	Dabakneti		
Dabakneti Church of Saint George		late Middle Ages	Dabakneti		
Dabakneti Church of Saint Mary		Middle Ages	Dabakneti		
Dadianeti Church		Middle Ages	Dadianeti		
Dadianeti Roundback Tower	2296	9th-10th centuries	Dadianeti	Cultural Monument	
Dadianeti Church of Kviratskhoveli		late Middle Ages	Dadianeti		
Dadianeti Tower		late Middle Ages	Dadianeti		
Ruins of Dadianeti Church		Middle Ages	Dadianeti		
Holy Trinity Church of Dadianeti	2297	High Middle Ages	Dadianeti	Cultural Monument	
Dadianeti Church of the Mother of Jesus'		late Middle Ages	Dadianeti		
Ruins of Dadianeti Church of the Mother of Jesus'		Middle Ages	Dadianeti		
Saint George monastery in Dadianeti	2295	High Middle Ages	Dadianeti	Cultural Monument	
Delkani Church of Kviratskhoveli		late Middle Ages	Delkani		
Doliani Church of Saint George		late Middle Ages	Former village of Doliani		
Doretkari Church of Saint Barbara	2299	9th-10th centuries	Doretkari	Cultural Monument of National Significance	
Doretkari Tower		late Middle Ages	Doretkari		
Doretkari Church of Saint George	2300	High Middle Ages	Doretkari	Cultural Monument	
Church of Basilis Dzma		20th century	Monasteri		
Eloiani Church		Transitional period	Eloiani		
Roundback Tower of Eloiani		Late Middle Ages	Eloiani		
Ruins of Eloiani Church of Lomisa		Late Middle Ages	Eloiani		
Ereda Church of the Mother of Jesus'		Late Middle Ages	Ereda		
Velura Tower		Middle Ages	Velura		
Upper Boli Church of Kviratskhoveli		Middle Ages	Upper Boli		
Upper Boli Tower		Middle Ages	Upper Boli		
Upper Boli Church of Saint Marine		Middle Ages	Upper Boli		
Upper Gru Church of Saint George		Transitional period	Upper Gru		
Ruins of Upper Zakhori Church		Middle Ages	Upper Zakhori		
Upper Zakhori Tower		17th century	Upper Zakhori		
Upper Zakhori First Church of Saint George		Transitional period	Upper Zakhori		
Upper Zakhori Second Church of Saint George	2302	Middle Ages	Upper Zakhori	Cultural Monument	
Upper Kari Church		Middle Ages	Chkuneti		
Upper Tsiri Church of Bzezva		Transitional period	Upper Tsiri		
Upper Tsurbeni Church of Plain Cross		Late Middle Ages	Upper Tsurbeni		
Upper Tsurbeni Church of Mountain Cross		Late Middle Ages	Upper Tsurbeni		
Upper Jortisi Church		Late Middle Ages	Chkuneti		
Zodekhi Church		Late Middle Ages	Zodekhi		
Former Zodekhi Church of Kviratskhoveli		Late Middle Ages	Zodekhi		
Former Zodekhi Church		Middle Ages	Zodekhi		
Zodekhi Church of Saint George	2304	Late Middle Ages	Zodekhi	Cultural Monument	
Tinikaani Church of Kviratskhoveli		Middle Ages	Tinikaani		
Tinikaani church of Holy Trinity		Transitional period	Tinikaani		
Togoiani Tower		Middle Ages	Chigoiani		
Ruins of Tokhta Church		Late Middle Ages	Tokhta		
Former Tokhta Church of Kviratskhoveli		Middle Ages	Tokhta		
Tokhta Tower		Late Middle Ages	Tokhta		
Former Tokhta Church of the Mother of Jesus		Middle Ages	Tokhta		
Tokhta Church of Saint George		Late Middle Ages	Tokhta		
Ruins of Tokhta Church of Saint George		Late Middle Ages	Tokhta		
Tokhta Church of Saint Marine		Middle Ages	Tokhta		
First Tokhta Church of Saint Marine		Late Middle Ages	Tokhta		
Ikoti Tower		Late Middle Ages	Ikoti		
Ikoti Church of Saint Barbara		Late Middle Ages	Ikoti		
Ikoti Church of Saint George		Transitional Period	Ikoti		
Ikoti Church of Saint Marine		Late Middle Ages	Ikoti		
Icheti Church		Late Middle Ages	Zakhori		
Kabeni Monastery	2322	9th century	Kanchaveti	Cultural Monument of National Significance	
Ruins of Kitriuli Church of Kvelatsminda		Middle Ages	Near Kitriuli		
Former Church of Ascension' in Kitriuli		Middle Ages	Kitriuli		
Ruins of Kitriuli Church of the Mother of Jesus		Middle Ages	Kitriuli		
Former Church of Kvelatsminda in Kitriuli		Middle Ages	Kitriuli		
Kobati Church		Transitional Period	Sadzeguri		
Ruins of Kobauri Church		Middle Ages	Sadzeguri		
Korinta Church of Kviratskhoveli		Transitional Period	Korinta		
Korinta Tower		Late Middle Ages	Korinta		
Korinta Church of Saint George	2308	Late Middle Ages	Korinta	Cultural Monument	
Kuckhati Church of Saint George		Late Middle Ages	Middle Zakhori		
Kuthkhoveti Church of Saint George		Transitional Period	Doretkari		
Kuthkhoveti Church of Saint George (Middle Ages)		Late Middle Ages	Doretkari		
Largvisi Ascension's Church		Transitional Period	Former village of Sakoreti		
Largvisi Church		Transitional Middle Ages	Largvisi		
Ruins of Largvisi Church		Transitional Middle Ages	Premises of Largvisi		
Largvisi Monastery	2310	14th century; 1721–1741 years	Premises of Largvisi	Cultural Monument of National Significance	
Largvisi Church of Saint George		Late Middle Ages	Premises of Largvisi		
Lomisa church	2288	9th or 10th century	premises of Akhalgori	Cultural Monument of National Significance	
Ruins of Martiani Church		Late Middle Ages	Martiani		
Martiani Church of Kviratskhoveli		Late Middle Ages	Premises Martiani		
Martiani First Church of Saint George		Late Middle Ages	Martiani		
Martiani Second Church of Saint George	2311	Late Middle Ages	Martiani	Cultural Monument	
Martiani Monastery of the Holy Cross		High Middle Ages	Premises of Martiani		
Makhiareti Church		Transitional Period	Makhiareti		
Ruins of Makhiareti Church		Late Middle Ages	Makhiareti		
Ruins of Makhiareti Roundback Tower		High Middle Ages	Makhiareti		
Makhiareti Church of Kviratskhoveli		Late Middle Ages	Makhiareti		
Ruins of Makhiareti Tower		Late Middle Ages	Makhiareti		
Makhiareti Church of Archangel		Transitional Period	Makhiareti		
Makhiareti Building and Tower		Late Middle Ages	Makhiareti		
Makhiareti Church of Saint Maria		Late Middle Ages	Makhiareti		
Ruins of Monasteri Church		Middle Ages	Monasteri		
Monasteri Tower		Late Middle Ages	Monasteri		
Monasteri Church of Baptist		Late Middle Ages	Monasteri		
Monasteri Monastery of the Mother of Jesus	2171	8th-9th centuries	Monasteri	Cultural Monument	
Morbedani Ascension's Church		Late Middle Ages	Morbedaani		
Morbedaani Church of Saint George		Early Middle Ages	Morbedaani		
Morbedaani Church of Dormition Cross	2313	Early Middle Ages	Mosabruni	Cultural Monument	
Morbedaani Church of the Mother of Jesus	2315	Early Middle Ages	Mosabruni	Cultural Monument	
Morbedaani Church of Saint George		High Middle Ages	Mosabruni		
Former Mskhlebi Church of Kviratskhoveli		Middle Ages	Mskhlebi		
Mskhlebi Church of Saint George	2243	Late Middle Ages	Mskhlebi	Cultural Monument	
Former mujukhi Church of Saint George		Middle Ages	Mujukhi		
Mshvelieti church		Transitional Middle Ages	Mshvelieti		
Mshvelieti church of Kviratskhoveli		Middle Ages	Mshvelieti		
Ruins of Mshvelieti Tower		Middle Ages	Mshvelieti		
Mshvelieti church of the Mother of Jesus		Transitional Middle Ages	Mshvelieti		
Mshvelieti church of Saint George		High Middle Ages	Mshvelieti		
Mshvelieti chapel of Saint Elijah		Middle Ages	Mshvelieti		
Ruins of Nagomevi church		Late Middle Ages	Nagomevi		
Nagomevi Tower		Late Middle Ages	Nagomevi		
Nagomevi church of Mtisjvari	2317	High Middle Ages	Nagomevi	Cultural Monument	
Nagomevi church of Red Cross		Late Middle Ages	Nagomevi		
Nakhidi church of Kviratskhoveli		Late Middle Ages	Nakhidi		
Nakhidi church of Baptist	2318	Transitional Period	Nakhidi	Cultural Monument	
Nakhidi church of the Mother of Jesus		Late Middle Ages	Nakhidi		
Nakhidi monastery of Saint George		Transitional Period	Nakhidi		
Niko church		Middle Ages	Akhmaji		
Pavliantkari tower		16th-17th centuries	Pavliantkari		
Ruins of Pavliantkari tower		Middle Ages	Pavliantkari		
Ruins of Sabarkleti tower		Middle Ages	Sabarkleti "Lower Kara"		
Ruins of Sabarkleti tower		Middle Ages	Sabarkleti		
Former Sabarkleti church		Late Middle Ages	Sabarkleti		
Sabarkleti church of the Mother of Jesus		20th century	Sabarkleti "Lower Kara"		
Sabarkleti church of Saint George		Late Middle Ages	Sabarkleti		
Sakoreti church of Saint George		Late Middle Ages	Former village of Sakoreti		
Sadzeguri church		Late Middle Ages	Sadzeguri		
Sadzeguri church (Ulda)		Transitional Period	Sadzeguri		
Sadzeguri church of Kviratskhoveli		Late Middle Ages	Sadzeguri		
Ukanamkhari Ascension's church		Late Middle Ages	Ukanamkhari		
Ruins of Ukanamkhari church		Late Middle Ages	Ukanamkhari		
Ukanamkhari monastery of Kviratskhoveli		8-9th centuries	Ukanamkhari		
Former Ukanamkhari church		Middle Ages	Ukanamkhari		
Ruins of Ukanamkhari church of Holy Trinity			Ukanamkhari		
Ukanamkhari monastery		Late Middle Ages	Ukanamkhari		
Ukanaubani Roundback tower (Former Village)		9th-10th centuries	Ukanaubani, Former village		
Ukanaubani church		Transitional Period	Ukanaubani, Former village		
Second Ruins of Ukanaubani church		Middle Ages	Ukanaubani, Former village		
Ruins of Ukanaubani church		Middle Ages	Ukanaubani, Former village		
Ukanaubani Roundback tower		9th-10th centuries	Ukanaubani, Former village		
Ukanaubani church of Archangel		Transitional Period	Ukanaubani, Former village		
Ukanaubani church of Saint George		Transitional Period	Ukanaubani, Former village		
Ukanaubani tower	2320	6th century	Ukanaubani, Former village	Cultural Monument	
Ukanaubani church of Tsikhe	2320	6th century	Ukanaubani, Former village	Cultural Monument	
Pirtskhelaurebi tower (Tsirkoli)	2334	Late Middle Ages	Tsirkoli	Cultural Monument	
Kashveti Church (zhorzhokhi)		Middle Ages	zhorzhokhi		
Qedigora church of Kviratskhoveli		Late Middle Ages	Qedigora		
Qedigora church of Saint George		Late Middle Ages	Qenqaani		
Qenqaani church of Archangel		Transitional Period	Qenqaani		
Qenqaani church of Saint Barbara		Late Middle Ages	Qenqaani		
Qenqaani church of Saint George		Late Middle Ages	Qenqaani		
Lower Alevi monastery of Mikel-gabriel		Middle Ages	Lower Alevi		
Lower Alevi church of the Mother of Jesus	2321	Transitional Period	Lower Alevi	Cultural Monument	
Ruins of Lower Alevi church of Saint Marine		Late Middle Ages	Lower Alevi		
Ruins of Lower Boli Tower		Late Middle Ages	Lower Boli		
Lower Boli church of Archangel		Late Middle Ages	Lower Boli		
Lower Gru church of Saint George		Middle Ages	Lower Gru		
Lower Tsurbeni church of Saint George		10th-11th centuries	Lower Tsurbeni		
Qoloti tower		Late Middle Ages	Qoloti		
Qoloti church of the Mother of Jesus		Early Middle Ages	Qoloti		
Qsani church of Armazi	2291	864 year	Armazi	Cultural Monument of National Significance	
Qurta church		Late Middle Ages	Qurta		
Qurta church		Early Middle Ages	Qurta		
Qurta church of Lasharoba		Late Middle Ages	Qurta		
Former Qurta church		Middle Ages	Qurta		
Qurta church of Saint George		Late Middle Ages	Qurta		
Ghuzhaani church of the Mother of Jesus		Middle Ages	Ghuzhaani		
Kanchaveti church		Late Middle Ages	Kanchaveti		
Kanchaveti church of Saint george		Late Middle Ages	Kanchaveti		
Ruins of Kru-Sakdari church		Middle Ages	Kitriuli		
Shariiant Kari church of the Mother of Jesus		Late Middle Ages	Dadianeti		
Middle Alevi church		Transitional Middle Ages	Middle Alevi		
Middle Alevi church of Kviratskhoveli		Late Middle Ages	Middle Alevi		
Middle Alevi church of Niche Holly Trinity	2325	Late Middle Ages	Middle Alevi	Cultural Monument	
Middle Alevi church of the Mother of Jesus		Late Middle Ages	Middle Alevi		
Middle Alevi church of Saint Maria		Late Middle Ages	Middle Alevi		
Middle Zakhori church		Late Middle Ages	Middle Zakhori		
Middle Zakhori church of Saint Nicholas		Transitional Period	Middle Zakhori		
Chigoiani church		Late Middle Ages	Chigoiani		
Ruins of Chigoiani church		Late Middle Ages	Chigoiani		
Ruins of Chigoiani Roundback tower		9th-10th centuries	Chigoiani		
Chigoiani Roundback tower		9th-10th centuries	Chigoiani		
Chigoiani Roundback tower (9th-10th centuries)		9th-10th centuries	Chigoiani		
Chigoiani church of Kviratskhoveli		Transitional Period	Chigoiani		
Chigoiani tower		17th century	Chigoiani		
Chigoiani Forth Roundback tower		9th-10th centuries	Chigoiani		
Chigoiani Second church		Late Middle Ages	Chigoiani		
Chigoiani Second Roundback tower		9th-10th centuries	Chigoiani		
Second Former Chigoiani church		Late Middle Ages	Chigoiani		
Chigoiani Third Roundback tower		9th-10th centuries	Chigoiani		
First Chigoiani church		Transitional Period	Chigoiani		
Chigoiani First Roundback tower		9th-10th centuries	Chigoiani		
First Former Chigoiani church		Late Middle Ages	Chigoiani		
Chigoiani monastery		9th-10th centuries	Chigoiani		
Chigoiani Red chapel		Late Middle Ages	Chigoiani		
Chigoiani church of Red Cross		Late Middle Ages	Chigoiani		
Chigoiani church of Saint George		Late Middle Ages	Chigoiani		
Ruins of Chitiani church		Late Middle Ages	Chitiani		
Chitiani church of Kvelatsminda	2328	High Middle Ages	Chitiani	Cultural Monument	
Chquneti church (Middle Ages)		Middle Ages	Chquneti		
Ruins of Chquneti church		Late Middle Ages	Chquneti		
Chquneti church of Kviratshoveli		Middle Ages	Chquneti		
Chquneti church of Saint George		Transitional Middle Ages	Chquneti		
Tsikhiskari monastery		Transitional Period	Chquneti		
Tsetskhlijvroba tower		Late Middle Ages	Balaani		
Tsikhisopeli Roundback tower		Transitional Period	Tsikhisopeli		
Tsikhisopeli church of Kviratskhoveli		Middle Ages	Tsikhisopeli		
Tsikhisopeli church of Archangel		Late Middle Ages	Tsikhisopeli		
Tsikhisopeli monastery		Transitional Period	Tsikhisopeli		
Cotaguri church of Saint George		19th century	Cotaguri		
Ckhavati church		Late Middle Ages	Ckhavati		
Ckhavati church of Kviratskhoveli		Late Middle Ages	Ckhavati		
Ckhavati church of Lomta		Late Middle Ages	Ckhavati		
Ckhavati church of Jesus Christ	2329	8th-9th centuries	Ckhavati	Cultural Monument of National Significance	
Ckhavati monastery	2330	Late Middle Ages	Ckhavati	Cultural Monument of National Significance	
Ckhavati tower of Saint Barbara		Late Middle Ages	Ckhavati		
Ckhavati church of Saint George		Late Middle Ages	Ckhavati		
Dzeglevi Church of Saint Barbara	2331	High Middle Ages	Dzeglevi	Cultural Monument	
Dzeglevi Church of Saint George	6854	Late Middle Ages	Dzeglevi	Cultural Monument	
Dzukatkari church		Early Middle Ages	Dzukatkari		
Tsinagari church		Middle Ages	Tsinagari		
Tsirkoli church of the Mother of God	2332	8th century	Tsirkoli	Cultural Monument of National Significance	
Tsirkoli Church of Saint George	2335	Late Middle Ages	Tsirkoli	Cultural Monument	
Tsirkoli Second church of Saint George		Late Middle Ages	Tsirkoli		
Tsirkoli church of Saint Maria		19th century	Tsirkoli		
Ruins of Tsirkoli church		Middle Ages	Tsirkoli		
Tsiptauri church		Late Middle Ages	Tsiptauri		
Tsiptauri Roundback tower		9th-10th centuries	Tsiptauri		
Tsiptauri church of Jesus Christ		Late Middle Ages	Tsiptauri		
Tsurbeni Tvabacila church		Middle Ages	Tsurbeni		
Tzhandari church		Trnsitional Middle Ages	Tzhandari		
Tzhandari church of Kviratskhoveli		Middle Ages	Tzhandari		
Tzhatzhamuri church of Jesus Christ		Transitional Middle Ages	Tzhatzhamuri		
Tzhatzhamuri church of the Mother of Jesus		Middle Ages	Tzhatzhamuri		
Tzhortzhokhi church		Transitional Period	Tzhortzhokhi		
Tzhortzhokhi church of Kviratskhoveli		Early Middle Ages	Tzhortzhokhi		
Tzhortzhokhi tower		Late Middle Ages	Tzhortzhokhi		
Tzhortzhokhi church of Saint George		High Middle Ages	Tzhortzhokhi		
Tsurta church		Late Middle Ages	Chkuneti		
Khadilaani church		Late Middle Ages	Dadianeti		
Khadilaani tower	2296	Late Middle Ages	Dadianeti	Cultural Monument	
Khopa monastery	2289	13th century	Premises of Mosabruni	Cultural Monument of National Significance	
Khokhaant tower		Late Middle Ages	Doretkari		

== See also ==
- List of Cultural Heritage Monuments of Georgia
