= List of monuments in Sukhumi Municipality =

The monuments in the Sukhumi Municipality is a group of cultural heritage sites registered by the government of Georgia on the territory of a de jure territorial unit, which corresponds to the Sukhumi District in Abkhazia. (Note: The political status of Abkhazia is disputed. Having unilaterally declared independence from Georgia in 1992, Abkhazia is formally recognised as an independent state by 5 UN member states (two other states previously recognised it but then withdrew their recognition), while the remainder of the international community recognizes it as de jure Georgian territory. Georgia continues to claim the area as its own territory, designating it as Russian-occupied territory.)

The table lists a monument, its location and dating as well as the status attached to it by the Georgian authorities and the number assigned in the registry by the National Agency for Cultural Heritage Preservation of Georgia, which is available online as a GIS portal. The Agency broadly classifies the heritage sites into three groups: 1) the objects without a status, 2) immovable monuments of cultural heritage, and 3) immovable monuments of national significance.

Object	National Registry number	Date of construction	Location	Status	Image
Abjakhva church		middle ages	Abjakhva		
Church of St. Elia in Amzara	3518	1910	Amzara	Cultural Monument	
Achadara fossil			Achadara		
church of St. George in Achadara	3519	20th century	Achadara	Cultural Monument	
akhalsopheli tower			Akhalsopheli		
Akhalsheni shrine	3520	Middle ages	Akhalsheni	Cultural Monument	
Akhalsheni fortress	3521	Middle ages	Akhalsheni	Cultural Monument	
Church of St. George in Akhalsheni		1894	Akhalsheni		
Church of St. Theodore in Akhalsheni	3522	Middle ages			
Akhra-kapshi settlement			Sukhumi		
Bagrati fortress		Middle ages	Sukhumi		
Besleti cave			Besleti		
Besleti sulfur bath			Besleti		
Besleti church	3523	Middle ages	Besleti	Cultural Monument	
Besleti castle-hall			Besleti		
Church of St. George in Besleti		19th century	Besleti		
Besleti Bridge	3515	12th-13th centuries	Sukhumi	Cultural Monument of National Significance	
Church of St. Elia in Birdja		20th century	Birdja		
Gvarda ascension church		19th century	Gvarda		
Gvarda church		1925	Gvarda		
Guma fortress ruins	3525	Middle ages	Guma	Cultural Monument	
Gumista locking castle		Middle ages	Gumista		
Gumista castle-hall	3527	Middle ages	Gumista	Cultural Monument	
Dioscurias castle	3516	1st century BC	Sukhumi	Cultural Monument of National Significance	
Eshera church		Middle ages	Eshera		
Church of St. Demetre in Zemo birtskha	3528	20th century	Zemo birtskha	Cultural Monument	
Zemo eshera dolmens		Bronze age	Zemo eshera		
Zemo eshera church	3529	19th century	Zemo eshera	Cultural Monument	
Zemo iashtkhva church		Middle ages	Zemo iashtkhva		
Zemo iashtkhva church ruins	3530	Middle ages	Zemo iashtkhva	Cultural Monument	
Kamani church		11th century	Shroma		
Kamani cave			Kamani		
Kamani monastery building		19th-20th centuries	Kamani		
Kamani castle-hall	3532	Middle ages	Kamani	Cultural Monument	
church of St. Vasili in Kamani		Middle ages			
Kari church			Kelasuri		
Kelasuri church	3533	19th-20th centuries	Kelasuri	Cultural Monument	
Kelasuri Architectural Complex		Middle ages	Kelasuri		
Kelasuri castle-hall		Middle ages	Kelasuri		
Church of St. kharlapi in Lekukhona		1911	Lekukhona		
Mtiskalta church	3534	19th-20th centuries	Mtiskalta	Cultural Monument	
church of the transfiguration in Mtiskalta	3535	19th century	Mtiskalta	Cultural Monument	
church of St. Ilia in Nakhshira	3537	20th century	Nakhshira	Cultural Monument	
Church of St. Panaia in Nakhshira	3536	Middle ages	Nakshira	Cultural Monument	
Church of Nikola Blagevechinski			Sukhumi		
Church of the Virgin Mary in Odishi	3538	middle ages	Odishi	Cultural Monument	
Church of St. John the Apostole in Odishi		Middle ages	Odishi		
Church of St. Kostantine in Odishi		Middle ages	Odishi		
Ozaba Cave			Zemo eshera		
Pavlovskoe Church	3539	20th century	Pavlovskoe	Cultural Monument	
Church of the Virgin Mary in Petrovskoe		20th century	Petrovskoe		
Sukhumi Hotel			Sukhumi		
Sukhumi dendropark	3514	1951-1952	Sukhumi		
Sukhumi Cathedral	7313	1909-1915	Sukhumi	Cultural Monument	
Sukhumi cemetery			Sukhumi		
Sukhumi Synagogue	3517	20th century	Sukhumi	Cultural Monument	
Sukhumi church		1882-1884	Sukhumi		
Sukhumi lighthouse	7709	1861	Sukhumi	Cultural Monument	
Church of St. George in Sukhumi		Middle ages	Sukhumi		
Sokhumkale		Middle ages	Sukhumi		
phskhu castle	3540	Middle ages	Phskhu	Cultural Monument	
Church of the Virgin Mary in Qvemo birtskha	3541	Middle ages	Qvemo birtskha	Cultural Monument	

== See also ==
- List of Cultural Heritage Monuments of Georgia
