= Greg Lindquist =

American artist

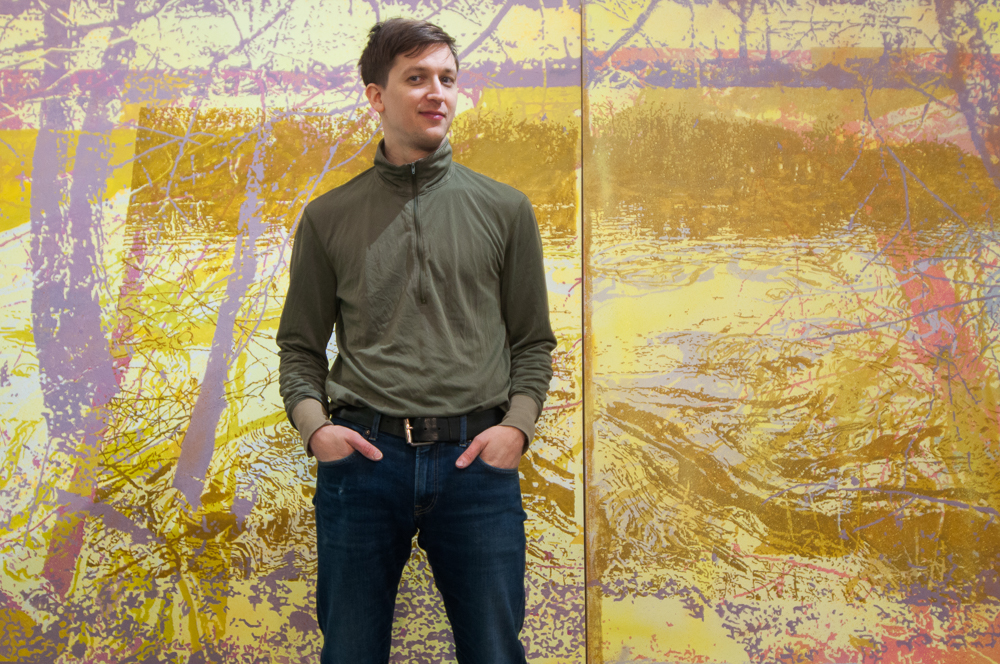
- Lindquist in his studio with Duke Energy's Dan River I (both 2014) and Duke Energy's Dan River II, 2017
- Born: Greg Lindquist; May 9, 1979 (age 47); Wilmington, North Carolina, U.S.
- Education: NC State University, Pratt Institute, Whitney Museum of American Art Independent Study Program
- Known for: Painting
- Awards: Pollock-Krasner Grant, Sally and Milton Avery Grant, Marie Walsh Sharpe Residency

Greg Lindquist (born May 9, 1979) is an American artist, painter, writer, and educator based in New York. His wok addresses landscape, industrial infrastructure, environmental disasters, and the visual expression of pollution through painting, installation, and research-based public projects. Critics and writers have discussed his work in relation to the post-industrial landscape, coal ash, diesel emissions, wildfire imagery, and the political history of American landscape painting.

Lindquist's project include early paintings of deindustrialized urban sites of gentifrication, the participatory environmental project Smoke and Water, the coal ash painting series Of Ash and Coal, the diesel particulate and rolling coal project Slow Burn, and later wildfire paintings.

== Early life and education ==
Greg Lindquist was born in Wilmington, North Carolina. Lindquist studied art and English at North Carolina State University, and attended graduate school in New York at Pratt Institute, earning an MFA in painting and masters in art history. He also was a studio participant at the Whitney Museum of American Art Independent Study Program (ISP).

During graduate school, Lindquist was a research intern at the Museum of Modern Art, writing wall labels for the permanent collection including Andrew Wyeth's Christina's World, as well as paintings by Arshile Gorky and Willem de Kooning. He also worked as an assistant for the artist Ryan McGinness.

== Work ==
Early Industrial Landscapes

Lindquist's early work addressed landscape as a memorial, confronting the gentrification of the deindustrialized Brooklyn waterfronts of Williamsburg and Red Hook in late capitalism. The paintings took the shape of elongated horizons, metallic surfaces describing sky, water, and graffiti. The light of these industrialscapes often was a glowing twilight, and the work was often compared to the British-American painter Rackstraw Downes. Painter and writer Stephen Westfall summarizes the early work, "Lindquist's melancholy marks him as a Romantic. When I look at his work, I see layered influences bouncing back and forth across history: Morandi painting Friedrich painting Hopper." Addressing the entropic forces in architecture on a global scale, Lindquist traveled to Tbilisi, Georgia in 2009 to research decay from the Soviet Union era town Rustavi, which became the subject of the exhibition "Nonpasts" (2010). He also met Georgian artist Gio Sumbadze during this trip, with whom he'd collaborate for the next decade, such as "Frozen Moments, Architecture Speaks Back" in 2010.

Smoke and Water

The Dan River coal ash spill in 2014 has been the conceptual, visual, thematic, and political driver of his Smoke and Water project. Working in partnership with Working Films, he created an installation of paintings and murals from an image shared by a water keeper documenting ash swirling with river water. The work was completed collaboratively with the local art, ecology, and activist communities. Lindquist works with the guiding principle that art can facilitate social change, actively creating space for the possibility of mobilizing political action and reshaping common values. In 2015, he was Guest Critic for the November issue of The Brooklyn Rail and curated a concurrent show, Social Ecologies which focused on the intersections and ruptures between art and ecology.

Newtown Creek

Returning to NYC as a site of research, Lindquist has continued his engagement with community-centered, ecologically driven interventions through research on the Newtown Creek, a critically polluted waterway on the Brooklyn and Queens border. Working with the Newtown Creek Alliance, he has assisted with water quality collection and has reviewed EPA clean-up plans while serving on a technical data committee. He also co-organized an ongoing series of collaborative research events on a human-powered rowboat in the Newtown Creek's autonomous zone with up-close, site-specific fieldwork and painting.

== One-person exhibitions and projects ==
2017

- "Smoke and Water: Catawba", Partnership with Art in Buildings, Monroe, NC

2014

- "Smoke and Water", Partnership with Working Films, Wilmington, NC

2009

- "Brooklyn Industry", Brooklyn Academy of Music, Brooklyn, NY

2008

- "Remembrance of Things Present", NC State University, College of Design, Raleigh, NC. Travels to Bethel University, St.Paul, MN.

== Awards and residencies ==
- Marie Walsh Sharpe Residency Participant (2013–2014)
- Milton & Sally Avery Foundations Grant (2009)
- 2008-09 Pollock-Krasner Foundation Grantee (2009)
- Art Omi International Artists' Residency Participant, (2009)

== Group exhibitions ==
2016

- "Altered Land", North Carolina Museum of Art, Raleigh, NC

2012

- "Broken Desert - Land and Sea", University of Arizona Museum of Art, Tucson, AZ
- "Art on Paper 2012", Weatherspoon Art Museum, Greensboro, NC

2010

- "Planet of Slums", curated by Omar Lopez-Chahoud and La Toya Frazier, Rutgers University, New Brunswick, NJ (2010); Third Streaming, NY, NY (2011)
- "Frozen Moments: Architecture Speaks Back", Ministry of Transportation Project, organized by Laura Palmer Foundation (Poland), Tbilisi, Georgia

== Bibliography ==
2017

- "Murals with Morals" Creative Loafing Charlotte

2016

- Smoke and Water Catalogue

2015

- "By this River: Greg Lindquist Paints Against Coal-Ash Pollution", artcritical.com

2014

- "Culcalorus 20: Q+A with installation artist Greg Lindquist", Wilmington Star News
- "Coal Ash Impact Concerns Expressed through Art, Film", Lumina News
- "Focus on Coal Ash Art at Festival", Wilmington Star News
- "Surface Tension: Greg Lindquist in Conversation with Charlie Schultz", Artslant
- "Greg Lindquist on WetLand, Empathy, and Boat Cuisine"
- "On PAINTING, PLACE AND THE POLITICAL" by Greg Lindquist
- "Greg Lindquist" by Orit Gat, Bomb
- "Duke Energy, Greg Lindquist and Mary Mattingly", The Huffington Post
- "Environmental Art", The News and Observer
- "Kline and Lindquist Talk Site Specificity and Art Fairs", NY Arts Magazine

2013

- Warsza, Joanna, ed. Ministry of Highways: A Guide to the Performative Architecture of Tbilisi, Sternberg Press

2012

- Corwin, William. "Must-See Shows in New York", Saatchi Magazine Online
- "Greg Lindquist in conversation with Tom McGrath", BOMBlog
- McClermont, Doug. "Greg Lindquist at Elizabeth Harris Gallery", ARTnews
- McKee, Christina, "Past the City Limits: Greg Lindquist Breaks New Ground", artcritical.com

2011

- White, Amy. "New American landscapes at Flanders", Independent Weekly
- Tikhonova, Yulia. "Greg Lindquist at Elizabeth Harris", Sculpture
- Neil, Jonathan TD. "Planet of Slums", Art Review

2010

- Frazier, La Toya. "La Toya Frazier and Greg Lindquist ", Bomb Magazine
- Landi, Ann. "Critic's Pick", ArtNEWS, March
- Miller, Daniel. "Postcard from Tbilisi", Frieze Magazine on-line

2009

- Laneri, Raquel. "The Wasteland: Greg Lindquist's Industrial Landscapes", The South Wing, NY, NY
- Distil, Sara. "Jen Bekman Artist to Watch: Greg Lindquist", Flavorwire, NY, NY
- "Plenty for $20: Greg Lindquist's 20x200 Edition", New York Press, NY, NY

2008

- "Greg Lindquist at Elizabeth Harris", Art in America, October 2008
- "On the Waterfront", Independent Weekly, Raleigh, Durham, Chapel Hill, NC, September
- "Artist Freezes Urban Landscape in Flux", The News and Observer, Raleigh, NC, August 24, 2008
- "Art picks: Greg Lindquist at NCSU College of Design", The News and Observer, Raleigh, NC, August 22, 2008
- "Urban Landscapes at Elizabeth Harris", Art News, September, 2008
- "Remembrance of Things Present, " Essay by Cary Levine for NCSU and Bethel Exhibition Brochure, August, 2008
- "He Paints the Town", NC State Alumni Magazine, Summer 2008
- "Testing the Urban Topography", The New York Sun, June 18, 2008
- "Findings", Harper's Magazine, July issue, 2008
- "Brooklyn Industries", interview, New York Arts Magazine, May–June issue, 2008
- "Memorializing the Industrial Brooklyn", feature, Greenpoint Gazette, Mar 6, 2008
- "Rackstraw Downes at Betty Cuningham and Greg Lindquist at Elizabeth Harris", review, artcritical.com, Mar 1, 2008
- "Factory Guy", review, The New York Sun, Feb 21, 2008
- The James Kalm Report YouTube Channel, Feb 20, 2008
- "Fade to Grey", review, New York Arts Magazine', Feb 19, 2008
- "To Brooklyn" interview feature, The Morning News, Feb 11, 2008
- "Construction Sight" feature, Brooklyn Based, Feb 7, 2008
- "Brooklyn Construction and Destructoporn as Art" feature, Curbed.com, Feb 7, 2008

2007

- "A 'Naked' Lure for Artists", The New York Sun, June 28, 2007
- "Brooklyn in Ruins", review in the New York Observer, March 21, 2007
- "I Art Brooklyn", review in Brooklyn Paper, March 24, 2007
- "Q & A with Greg Lindquist", interview in Go Brooklyn, March 24, 2007
