= Shavparosnebi =

Shavparosnebi's Logo

The Shavparosnebi (შავფაროსნები) or Blackshields are a Georgian martial arts federation. The head of the Georgian Martial Arts union is Lasha Kobakhidze. Traditional Georgian martial arts has had a revival by the activities of Kobakhidze and his team of enthusiasts. They are known for their combat art performances and are actively involved in the revival of traditional Georgian fighting techniques. The Blackshields are named for historical Georgian partisan fighters, who painted their faces and shields black to engage in guerrilla warfare at night. The founders of the Blackshields began researching Georgian martial arts shortly before the collapse of the Soviet Union. Since then, the group and the subject of traditional fighting styles in general have become increasingly popular. Their training involves the use of daggers, swords, and axes, conducted exclusively outdoors and in all weather conditions. Students also engage in activities such as searching, by night, for items hidden in the forest by their instructors. The Blackshields are an all-male organization comprising some 300–400 members, with studios in most major Georgian cities.

They have performed demonstrations at the annual Art Gene folk festival since 2008. In April 2012, the group was invited to perform in Rome for the Natale di Roma festival, and were the first Georgian fighters to be invited to the city since Farsman Qveli in 144 AD.

On 23 August 2012, the Blackshields staged a protest in Batumi. It marked the one-year anniversary of the murder of Giorgi Laliashvili, one of their members. Georgian authorities arrested one man in connection with the murder, but Laliashvili's friends state that five more people had beaten him with brass knuckles before he was stabbed in the heart. The Blackshields organized the protest to demand the "impartial investigation and punishment of [the] other perpetrators".

Georgian martial art federation “Shavparosnebi” aims renovation and systematization of Georgian Martial Arts and different combative methods and traditions and its popularization in society. The Federation of Georgian martial arts “Shavparosnebi”, includes three main activities: sport, ethnographical researches and performance groups.

== Federation of Georgian Martial Arts ==
=== "Shavparosnebi" Doctrine - Wisdom, Truth, Strength ===
The Georgian martial art is one of the oldest and the most important part of Georgian culture. As well as Georgian culture, Georgian martial art has its particularities and specifics that differs it from other martial arts all over the world. These specifics are caused from its individual character, history and other. Georgian martial art contains the doctrine of morals, methods of fighting, methods of healthcare, performances, warriors' songs and dances.

Martial species – fencing, boxing, wrestling and fighting species with different arms. Learning Systems – mountaineers’ upbringing systems, individual systems, royal and noble upbringing systems, etc.

Physical exercises: recreation measures, breathing activities, physical and psychological exercises.

Methods of treatment: medicines, relaxing massages, medical bathes.

Games : “Lelo”, “Isindi”, “Kabakhi”, “Lakhti” and other.

Martial songs: medical, round dancing and ritual.

Martial dances: round dancing/ ritual dances

The name of federation “Shavparosnebi” (in English the word means Black Shields) has its historical meaning. During the whole history, Georgians fight the enemy that exceeded the Georgian army several thousand times. Because of this, Georgians were fighting as partisan detachments. These groups attacked enemy mostly at night and they colored their shields black to protect it from reflection of moonlight and be invisible for enemy. These groups were called Black Shields and they were known as dangerous warriors with unique martial mastership.

The idea of Georgian martial arts’ renewal was created in the late 20th century. Formation period lasted for several years and at last Union of Georgian Martial Arts was established in 2000. In 2011 organization transformed to Federation of Georgian Martial Arts “SHAPAROSNEBI”

Federation of Georgian Martial Arts aims renewal and popularization of Georgian martial traditions and methods and upbringing of new generation according to the martial arts traditions.

The members of “Shavparosnebi” have been taking part of scientific expeditions for about ten years. They have come around whole country step by step and found unique martial methods and technology. They use this information and create Georgian traditional weapons themselves. They have unique technique of single combat and theatrical martial shows.

“Shavparosnebi” are participating in largest annual folk festival in Georgia “Art-Gene” since its establishment (2004). Also are participating in different folk festivals and events all over the Georgia, such as: “Tbilisoba”, “Kazbegoba”, “Vajaoba”, “Shatiloba”, etc.

== Regions ==
In addition to Tbilisi, there are groups of “Shavparosnebi” in different regions of Georgia such as Kutaisi, Batumi, Gori, Kazbegi, and Rustavi. The groups conduct events in traditional sport and martial arts competitions.

== Charitable actions ==
After Georgian-Russian conflict in 2008, “Shavparosnebi” opened group for IDPs (Internally Displaced People) where 30 children were learning Georgian Martial Arts free of charge.

“Shavparosnebi” organized four charity concerts to help the children and youth with health problems. In future it is planned to organize charity performances more frequently and include the activity as a fourth one among the three main directions of federation activities.

== See more ==
კახაბერ ზარნაძე
