= Lasko Gussoev =

South Ossetian politician

Lasko Gussoev is an Ossetian politician from the partially recognized Republic of South Ossetia that served as a member of the Parliament of South Ossetia.

== Career ==
At the age of 24 Gussoev was one of the youngest people to ever be elected to the Parliament of South Ossetia.

Gussoev served as the director of the Tsinagari Secondary school where he entered a feud with Anatoly Bibilov's Ministry of Construction over the school's gym. Gussoev reported that the gym was constructed, however, the ministry never installed a transformer, rendering the building inoperable due to the lack of electricity to power lights, fans, and other utilities. Gussoev attempted to lobby the government for the funds so he could purchase and install the transformer himself, however, received no comment from the government on the issue. The former head of the Leningor district Vladimir Guliyev stated that the renovations would likely cost 20 million rubles, and that local government didn't have the required funds.

In 2023 Gussoev led a cultural celebration in Tsinagari named Arvyron which included a concert, a moment of silence for the dead of the 2008 Russo Georgian War, and a traditional dance ensemble in costume.
