= Internati =

Giorgi Chkondideli District ჭყონდიდელის დასახლება
- Rustavi district
- Interactive map of Giorgi Chkondideli District
- Location within Kvemo Kartli Location within Georgia
- Coordinates: 41°33′30″N 45°01′30″E
- Time zone: UTC+4 (Georgian Time)
- Website: www.rustavi.gov.ge

Internati, officially known as Giorgi Chkondideli District (Georgian: ჭყონდიდელის დასახლება), is a suburb of Rustavi, south-eastern Georgia, which is situated in the eastern part of the city and is separated from the rest of town by the Tbilisi-Baku railway track. The name Internati (Internatebi) comes from the short form of the word "International", used because diverse ethnic groups live there alongside Georgians. In spite of the popularity, it is not used as the official name.

== See also ==
- Rustavi
- Kvemo Kartli
