= Lidzava Church =

Church in Lidzava, Autonomous Republic of Abkhazia, Georgia

Lidzava Church ლიძავის ეკლესია (Georgian)
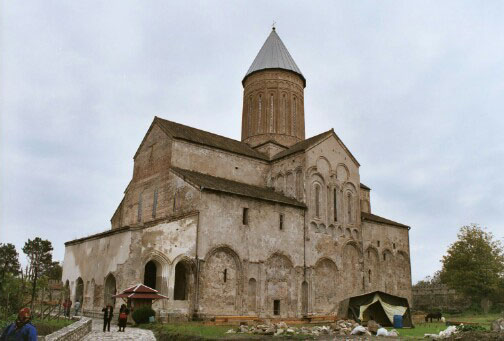

- Location within Abkhazia Location within Georgia

Religion
- Affiliation: Georgian Orthodox
- District: Gagra Municipality
- Province: Abkhazia
- Ecclesiastical or organizational status: ruins

Location
- Location: (Georgia (country)) Lidzava, Gagra Municipality, Abkhazia, Georgia
- Interactive map of Lidzava Church ლიძავის ეკლესია (Georgian)
- Coordinates: 43°10′35″N 40°22′28″E

Architecture
- Type: Church
- Completed: Middle Ages

Lidzava Church (Georgian: ლიძავის ეკლესია) is a church in the village of Lidzava, Gagra municipality, Autonomous Republic of Abkhazia, Georgia.

== History ==
The church was built in the Middle Ages. Excavations uncovered an early Christian church, which was tentatively dated to the 4th to 5th century AD. Although some of the walls have survived up to a height of 3 meters, the church plan was unclear. The church walls are in a heavy physical condition and need urgent conservation.
