= Robert Tedeyev =

Russian footballer

Personal information
- Full name: Robert Sklyarovich Tedeyev
- Date of birth: 23 January 1986 (age 40)
- Place of birth: Rustavi, Georgian SSR
- Height: 1.87 m (6 ft 1 1/2 in)
- Positions: Defender; midfielder

Youth career
- Yunost Vladikavkaz

Senior career*
Years	Team	Apps	(Gls)
2004–2005	FC Alania Vladikavkaz	0	(0)
2006	FC Oryol	32	(1)
2008	FC Abinsk (amateur)		
2008–2009	FC Yelets	22	(0)
- * Club domestic league appearances and goals

Robert Sklyarovich Tedeyev (Russian: Роберт Склярович Тедеев; born 23 January 1986) is a former Russian professional football player.

== Club career ==
He made his Russian Football National League debut for FC Oryol on 5 April 2006 in a game against FC Dynamo Bryansk.
