= List of monuments in Tighva Municipality =

The monuments in the Tighva Municipality is a group of cultural heritage sites registered by the government of Georgia on the territory of the de jure Tighva Municipality, which has been under the control of South Ossetia, an entity with limited international recognition, since the 2008 Russo-Georgian War. Due to the continued presence of the Russian troops, Georgia, in accordance to its Law on Occupied territories (Article 7.4), holds Russia responsible for the protection of cultural heritage in the area.

The table lists a monument, its location and dating as well as the status attached to it by the Georgian authorities and the number assigned in the registry by the National Agency for Cultural Heritage Preservation of Georgia, which is available online as a GIS portal. The Agency broadly classifies the heritage sites into three groups: 1) the objects without a status, 2) immovable monuments of cultural heritage, and 3) immovable monuments of national significance.

Object	National Registry number	Date of construction	Location	Status	Image
Avnevi Church Remains		Middle Ages	Avnevi		
Avnevi Mother of God Church		Middle Ages	Avnevi		
Avnevi Fortress		Late Middle Ages	Avnevi		
Alibari Church Remains		Late Middle Ages	Alibari		
Alibari Tower	2037	Late Middle Ages	Alibari	Cultural Monument	
Balta Church Komnadze		Late Middle Ages	Balta		
Balta Church Remains		Late Middle Ages	Balta		
Balta Church Remains (Middle Ages)		Middle Ages	Balta		
Balta Kviratskhoveli Church Remains		Middle Ages	Balta		
Didmukha Church Remains		Early Middle Ages	Didmukha		
Vakhtana Gomarta Shrine		Middle Ages	Vakhtana		
Vakhtana Church Remains		Late Middle Ages	Vakhtana		
Vakhtana Mother of God Church Remains	Late Middle Ages	Vakhtana			
Vakhtana Old Building Remains	2060	Middle Ages	Vakhtana	Cultural Monument	
Znauri Mother of God Church		Early Middle Ages	Znauri		
Teregvani Church Remains		Middle Ages	Teregvani		
Teregvani Jesus Church		Middle Ages	Teregvani		
Teregvani Main Martyr Church		Late Middle Ages	Teregvani		
Tighva Church Remains		Middle Ages	Tighva		
Tigva Monastery	2072	1152	Tighva	Cultural Monument of National Significance	
Tighva Old Building Remains I		Middle Ages	Tighva		
Tighva Old Building Remains II		Late Middle Ages	Tighva		
Tighva Saint Mariam Church	2071	Middle Ages	Tighva	Cultural Monument	
Isakkhau Saint Georgia Church		Late Middle Ages	Isakkhau		
Lisa Tskhrakara Church		13th Century	Lisa		
Lisa Cross		10th Century	Lisa		
Malda Church Remains		Middle Ages	Malda		
Metekhi Jesus Church		Late Middle Ages	Metekhi		
Metekhi Niche		Middle Ages	Metekhi		
Muguti Church Remains		Middle Ages	Muguti		
Moghrisi Saint George Church		Late Middle Ages	Moghrisi		
Nabakevi Ascension Church		Late Middle Ages	Nabakevi		
Nabakevi Church Remains		Middle Ages	Nabakevi		
Nedlati Kviratskhoveli Church		Early Middle Ages	Nedlati		
Nuli Church Remains		8th-9th Century	Nuli		
Ozhora Tskhrakara Church	2087	Middle Ages	Ozhora	Cultural Monument	
Ozhora Old Building Remains		Middle Ages	Ozhora		
Sunisi Saint George Church		Late Middle Ages	Sunisi		
Skhliti Church	2096	8th-9th Century	Skhliti	Cultural Monument	
Patkineti Church Remains			Patkineti		
Patkineti Saint Elijah Church		14th-15th Centuries	Patkineti		
Qaleti Mother Of God Church		Late Middle Ages	Qaleti		
Ghverteti Church Remains			Ghverteti		
Ghverteti Saint George Church Remains		Late Middle Ages	Ghverteti		
Kornisi Arminda Church		8th-9th Centuries	Kornisi		
Kornisi Gagiev Tower		17th-18th Centuries	Kornisi		
Kornisi Caves			Kornisi		
Kornisi Gverda Church		Middle Ages	Kornisi		
Kornisi Church Remains I		Late Middle Ages	Kornisi		
Kornisi Church Remains (Middle Ages)		Late Middle Ages	Kornisi		
Kornisi Tower			Kornisi		
Kornisi Tower (17th-18th Century)		17th-18th Centuries	Kornisi		
Kornisi Tower and Palace		17th Century	Kornisi		
Kornisi Church Remains II		Late Middle Ages	Kornisi		
Kornisi Trinity Church		Late Middle Ages	Kornisi		
Kornisi Saint George Church		19th Century	Kornisi		
Kornisi Saint Mary Church		Late Middle Ages	Kornisi		
Kornisi Khasievi Tower		18th-19th Centuries	Kornisi		
Kornisi Khutsiaant District Tower		Late Middle Ages	Kornisi		
Kornisi Jioeva Tower		Late Middle Ages	Kornisi		
Shindari Saint George Church		Late Middle Ages	Shindari		
Dzvileti Mother of God Church		Late Middle Ages	Dzvileti		
Dzvileti Saint George Church		Early Middle Ages	Dzvileti		
Tsnelisi Tower		Late Middle Ages	Tsnelisi		
Tsnelisi Building Remains I		Late Middle Ages	Tsnelisi		
Tsnelisi Building Remains II		Late Middle Ages	Tsnelisi		
Khastagdzuari Church		Late Middle Ages	Balta		
Khundisubani Mother of God Church		Middle Ages	Khundisubani		
Khundisubani Saint Nicholas Church		Middle Ages	Khundisubani		

== See also ==
- List of Cultural Heritage Monuments of Georgia
