= List of monuments in Eredvi Municipality =

The monuments in the Eredvi Municipality is a group of cultural heritage sites registered by the government of Georgia on the territory of the de jure Eredvi Municipality, which has been under the control of South Ossetia, an entity with limited international recognition, since the 2008 Russo-Georgian War. Due to the continued presence of the Russian troops, Georgia, in accordance to its Law on Occupied territories (Article 7.4), holds Russia responsible for the protection of cultural heritage in the area.

The table lists a monument, its location and dating as well as the status attached to it by the Georgian authorities and the number assigned in the registry by the National Agency for Cultural Heritage Preservation of Georgia, which is available online as a GIS portal. The Agency broadly classifies the heritage sites into three groups: 1) the objects without a status, 2) immovable monuments of cultural heritage, and 3) immovable monuments of national significance.

Object	National Registry number	Date of construction	Location	Status	Image
Mother of Jesus' Church in Andoreti		Middle ages	Andoreti		
Mother of Jesus' Church in Argvitsi		Middle ages	Argvitsi		
Mother of Jesus' Former Church in Ardisi			Ardisi		
Former Church of Saint George in Ardisi		Middle ages	Ardisi		
Church of Arkineti		Middle ages	Arkineti		
Arkineti Kvelatsminda Church		Middle ages	Arkineti		
Former Church of Saint George in Arkineti			Arkineti		
Ruins of Artsevi Church		Middle ages	Artsevi		
Former Church of Artsevi		Middle ages	Artsevi		
Mother of Jesus' Former Church Artsevi		Middle ages	Artsevi		
Church of Saint George in Adzvistavi		Middle ages	Adzvistavi		
Adzvistavi tower		Middle ages	Adzvistavi		
Atsriskhevi tower		Middle ages	Atsriskhevi		
Mother of Jesus' Church in Atsriskhevi	6064	9th-10th centuries	Atsriskhevi	Cultural Monument	
Atsriskhevi Fortress	1902	Middle ages	Atsriskhevi	Cultural Monument	
Church of Saint Mary in Atsriskhevi	6063	Middle ages	Atsriskhevi	Cultural Monument	
Mother of Jesus' Church's ruins in Beloti			Beloti		
Beloti fortress	6062	18th century	Beloti	Cultural Monument	
Church of Beloti fortress	6062	10th century	Beloti	Cultural Monument	
Ruins of Berijvari Church			Berijvari		
Bekhushe fortress	6062	Middle ages	Inauri	Cultural Monument	
Bieti Monastery	6074	Middle ages	Bieti	Cultural Monument of National Significance	
Mother of Jesus' Church in Bieti		Middle ages	Bieti		
Baqari fortress		18th century	Kvemo Baqari		
Gozo fortress			Gozo		
Gomarti Church	1949	8th-9th centuries	Satskheneti	Cultural Monument	
Dvalaintkari tower		Middle ages	Dvalaintkari		
Dvalaintkari Church	1911	Middle ages	Dvalaintkari	Cultural Monument	
Disevi tower		Middle ages	Disevi		
Disevi Dzelitskhoveli Church	6033	10th century	Disevi	Cultural Monument	
Stone Cross in Eltura		Middle ages	Eltura		
Eredvi basilica	6033	906 AD	Eredvi	Cultural Monument of National Significance	
Tskhetijvari Church of Eredvi	1924	Middle ages	Eredvi	Cultural Monument	
Saint Elia's Church in Eredvi	1923	14th century	Eredvi	Cultural Monument	
The Savior's Church in Vanati	1926	10th century	Vanati	Cultural Monument	
Vanati fortress	1927	Middle ages	Vanati	Cultural Monument	
Vilda fortress		Middle ages	Vilda		
Church of Saint George in Zemo Goreti		Middle ages	Zemo Goreti		
Zemo Vilda tower		Middle ages	Zemo Vilda		
Church's ruins in Zemo Vilda			Zemo Vilda		
Church of Holy Trinity in Zemo Vilda		Middle ages	Zemo Vilda		
Mother of Jesus' Church in Zemo Frisi	1937	Zemo Frisi	9th-10th centuries	Cultural Monument	
Mother of Jesus' Church in Zemo Charebi		Middle ages	Zemo Charebi		
Zonkari Hall	6059	Middle ages	Zemo Zonkari	Cultural Monument	
Zonkari tower		Middle ages	Zemo Zonkari		
Second tower of Zonkari		Middle ages	Zemo Zonkari		
Church with tower in Zonkari		Middle ages	Zemo Zonkari		
Mother of Jesus' Church in Zonkari	6058	Zemo Zonkari	8th-9th centuries	Cultural Monument	
Zonkari Shiotsminda Church	6060	Middle ages	Zemo Zonkari	Cultural Monument	
Ikorta church	1960	1172 AD	Ikorta	Cultural Monument of National Significance	
Ikorta fortress		Middle ages	Ikorta		
Ivreti tower			Ivreti		
Church of Saint George in Ivreti		Middle ages	Ivreti		
Inauri church	1938	Middle ages	Inauri	Cultural Monument of National Significance	
Inauri tower	6075	Middle ages	Inauri	Cultural Monument	
Ruins in inauri		Middle ages	Inauri		
Second tower of Inauri		Middle ages	Inauri		
Inauri fortress		Middle ages	Inauri		
Isrolskhevi tower		Middle ages	Isrolskhevi		
Mother of Jesus' Church in Isrolskhevi		Middle ages	Isrolskhevi		
The Savior's Church in Isrolskhevi		Middle ages	Isrolskhevi		
Church of Saint George in Kulbiti		Middle ages	Kulbiti		
Lacauri tower		Middle ages	Lacauri		
Second tower of Lacauri		Middle ages	Lacauri		
Ruins in Lacauri		Middle ages	Lacauri		
Third tower of Lacauri		Middle ages	Lacauri		
Ruins Lomisi Church		Middle ages	Beloti		
Former Church in Maraleti		Middle ages	Maraleti		
Alcove in Nisha		20th century	Nisha		
Church of Saint George in Ortevi		Middle ages	Ortevi		
Satikhari Church		Middle ages	Satikhari		
Mother of Jesus' Church in Satikhari	1946	9th-10th centuries	Satikhari	Cultural Monument	
Satikhari fortress	1945	18th century	Satikhari	Cultural Monument	
Satskheneti Kviratskhoveli Church	6055	Middle ages	Satskheneti	Cultural Monument	
Church of Saint George in Satskheneti		Middle ages	Satskheneti		
Siata Church	6065	Middle ages	Siata	Cultural Monument	
Siata tower	1904	Middle ages	Siata	Cultural Monument	
Siata ruins	6067	Middle ages	Siata	Cultural Monument	
Church of Saint George in Snekvi	9th-10th centuries	Zemo Snekvi			
Pokhalas fortress	1905	Middle ages	Beloti	Cultural Monument	
Karkiant church		Middle ages	Charebi		
Kashueti Church in Beloti	6057	Middle ages	Beloti	Cultural Monument	
Kvemo Vilda Church	6057	Middle ages	Kvemo Vilda	Cultural Monument	
Knogho fortress			Knogho		
Archangel's Church in Ksuisi	6051	Middle ages	Ksuisi	Cultural Monument	
Mother of Jesus' Former Church in Ksuisi			Ksuisi		
Ghvria tower		Middle ages	Ghvria		
Church of Holy Trinity with tower in Ghvria		Middle ages	Ghvria		
Shambieti Church		Middle ages	Shambieti		
Shambieti tower		Middle ages	Shambieti		
Shambieti ruins		Middle ages	Shambieti		
Shulauri			Shulauri		
Tsiteli Saqdari Church	1922	Middle ages	Eredvi	Cultural Monument	
Tsifori tower	6080	Middle ages	Tsifori	Cultural Monument	
Tskalitsminda ancient Church			Tskalitsminda		
Chalisubani Church		Middle ages	Chalisubani		
Ancient Church of Holy Trinity in Charebi		Middle ages	Charebi		
Mother of Jesus' Church in Charebi	1969	10th-11th centuries	Charebi	Cultural Monument	
Khaduriantubani fortress		18th century	Khaduriantubani		
Mother of Jesus' Church in Jvareti		Middle ages	Jvareti		
Church of Saint George in Jvareti		8th-9th centuries	Jvareti		

== See also ==
- List of Cultural Heritage Monuments of Georgia
