= Rustavi =

Rustavi რუსთავი
- City
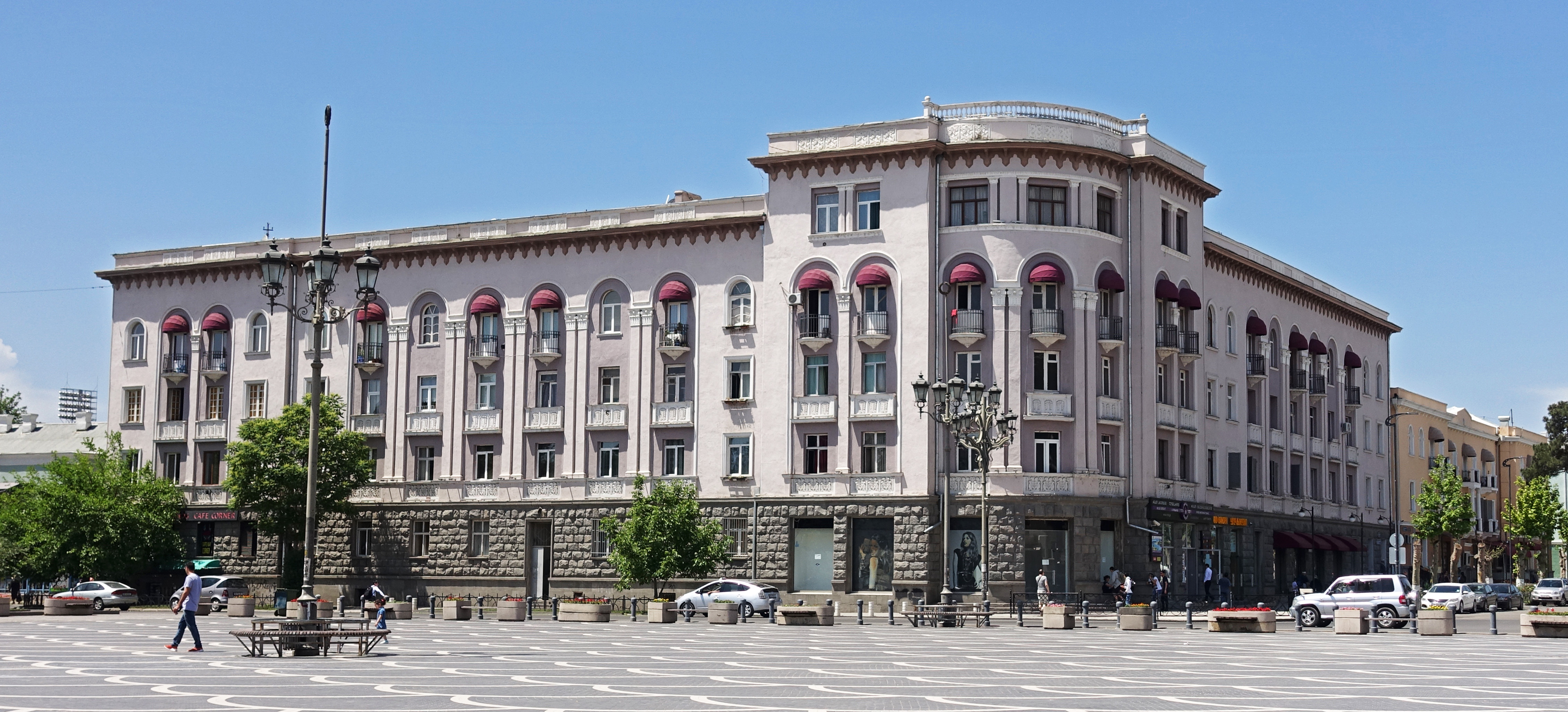
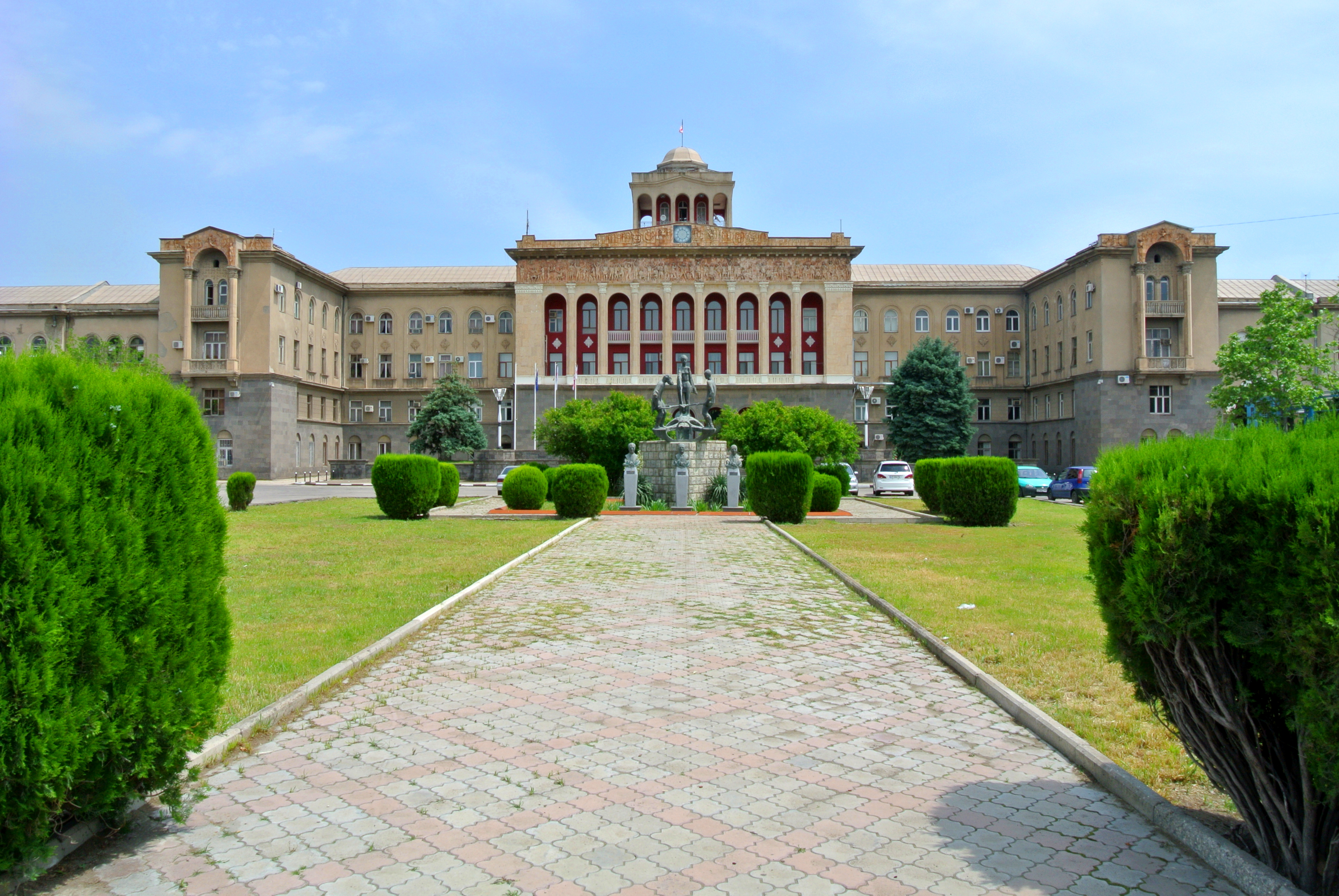
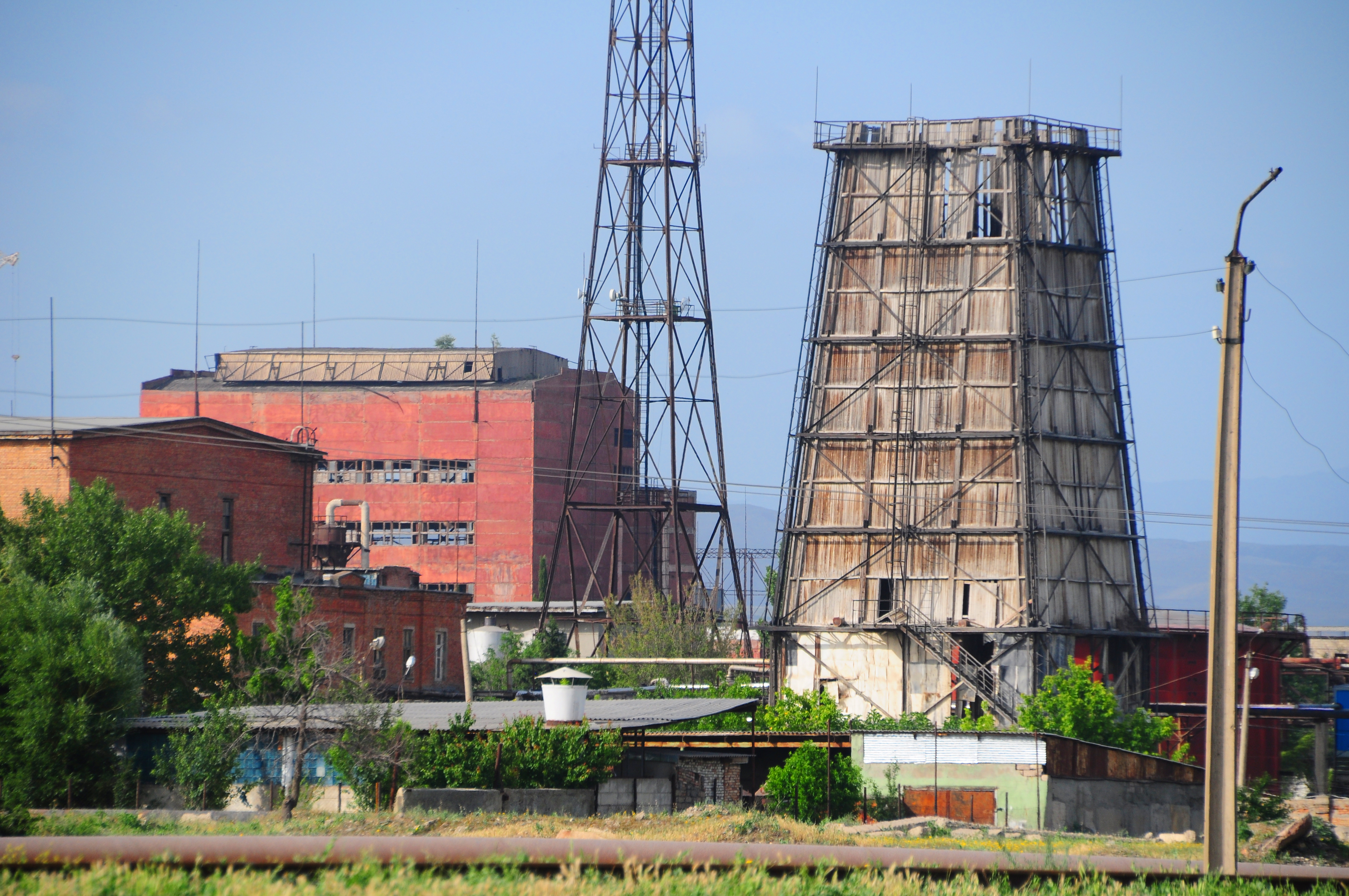
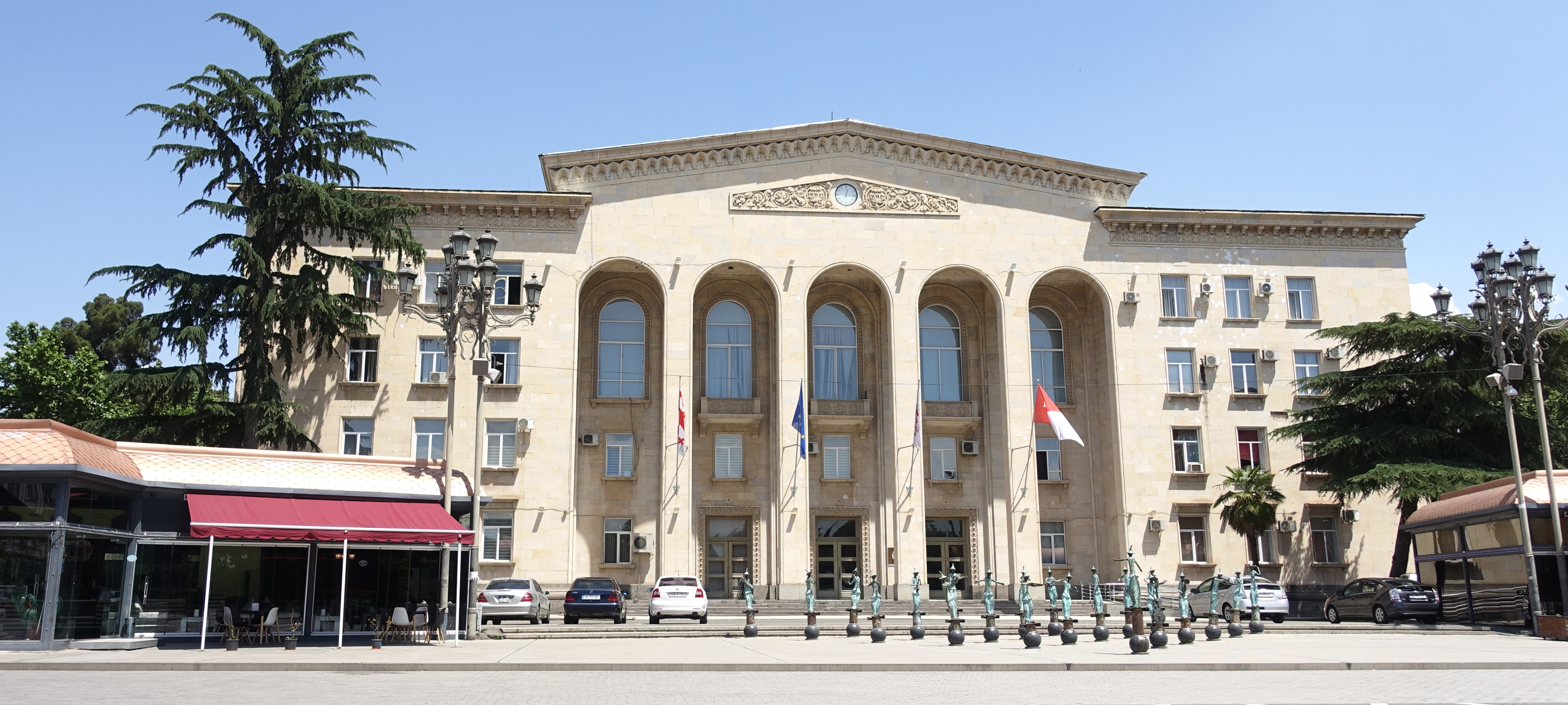
- Rustavi Main Square Rustavi Steel LLC Metallurgy Factory Rustavi City Hall

- Flag Seal
- Interactive map of Rustavi
- Location within Georgia Location within Kvemo Kartli
- Coordinates: 41°32′37″N 45°00′42″E
- Country: Georgia
- Mkhare: Kvemo Kartli

Government
  - Type: Mayor–Council
  - Body: Rustavi City Assembly
  - Mayor: Nino Latsabidze (GD)

Area
  - Total: 60.6 km^{2} (23.4 sq mi)
- Elevation: 330 m (1,080 ft)

Population (2024)
  - Total: 128,200
  - Rank: 3rd in Georgia
  - Density: 2,120/km^{2} (5,480/sq mi)

Population by ethnicity
  - Georgians: 91.8 %
  - Azerbaijanis: 3.7 %
  - Armenians: 1.6 %
  - Russians: 1.2 %
  - Ossetians: 0.4 %
- Time zone: UTC+4 (Georgian Time)
- Postal code: 3700
- Area code: (+995) 341
- Climate: Cfa
- Website: rustavi.gov.ge

Rustavi (Georgian: რუსთავი [ɾustʰavi]) is a city in the southeast of Georgia, in the region of Kvemo Kartli and 20 km (12 mi) south of the capital Tbilisi. It has a population of 127,154 (January 2024), making it the third most populous city in Georgia. Its economy is dominated by the Rustavi Metallurgical Plant.

== History ==
Rustavi is one of Georgia's older towns. The history of Rustavi has two phases: an early history from ancient times until the city was destroyed in the 13th century, and its modern history from the Soviet era to the present day.

=== Early history ===
The 11th-century Georgian chronicler, Leonti Mroveli, in his work The Georgian Chronicles, connects the foundation of the city to Kartlos, the eponymous ancestor of Georgians, whose wife had founded a town along the Kura river called Bostan-Kalaki (lit. "city of gardens"). The same chronicler, who also worked on The Life of the Kings, mentions the town Rustavi among those castles that opposed Alexander the Great's army, although it is proved that Alexander had never invaded Iberia. Rustavi is mentioned among other ancient towns such as Uplistsikhe, Urbnisi, Mtskheta and Sarkineti. It could be assumed that Rustavi as a city had been founded at least in the 5th–4th centuries B.C. Besides the manuscripts, excavations in the Rustavi castle prove that the city was an important political and administrative center of Iberia. In late 4th century A.D Trdat of Iberia had built a church and a canal in Rustavi.

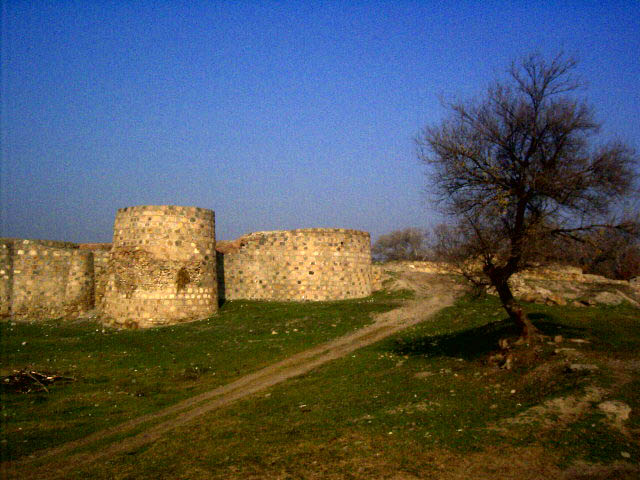
Rustavi fortress

During the reign of Vakhtang I of Iberia (in the 5th century), Rustavi took an important part in the political life of the Kingdom of Iberia. At the beginning of the 6th century, in 503, the Sassanids conquered Iberia and turned it into an ordinary Persian province ruled by a marzpan (governor). However, Byzantine Emperor Heraclius's offensive in 627 and 628 brought final victory over the Persians and ensured Byzantine predominance in Georgia, until the invasion of the Arabs. During the struggle against the Arab occupation, Rustavi belonged to the Principality of Kakheti. The latter would eventually form the Kakhetian kingdom, whose ruler, Kvirike III the Great, installed an Eristavi (duke) in Rustavi. Upon Kvirike's death, Kakheti was temporarily annexed by the Kingdom of Georgia. As soon as the Arabs were defeated, in 1068, Georgia was invaded by the resurgent Turkic Seljukids from Central Asia, under the command of Sultan Alp Arslan. A fierce battle took place between king Bagrat IV of Georgia and the Seljuks, where Bagrat was bitterly defeated and as a result, the king of Kakheti gained independence developing closer contact with the Seljuks and securing independence in this way. After the Seljukid invasions of Georgia, allied forces took Tbilisi and Rustavi and gave it to the Emir of Tbilisi. During that time, Rustavi declined, its economy was ruined, and only thanks to its strategic location did it remain as a well-fortified town in the hands of the emirs in Tbilisi. In 1069 Bagrat IV defeated emir Fadlun and captured the fortress of Rustavi, Partskhisi, and Agarani. During the anti-Seljuk campaigns led by David IV Rustavi played an essential role in securing Georgia's southern boundaries. Rustavi was finally destroyed after Timur's invasion of Georgia.

=== Modern history ===
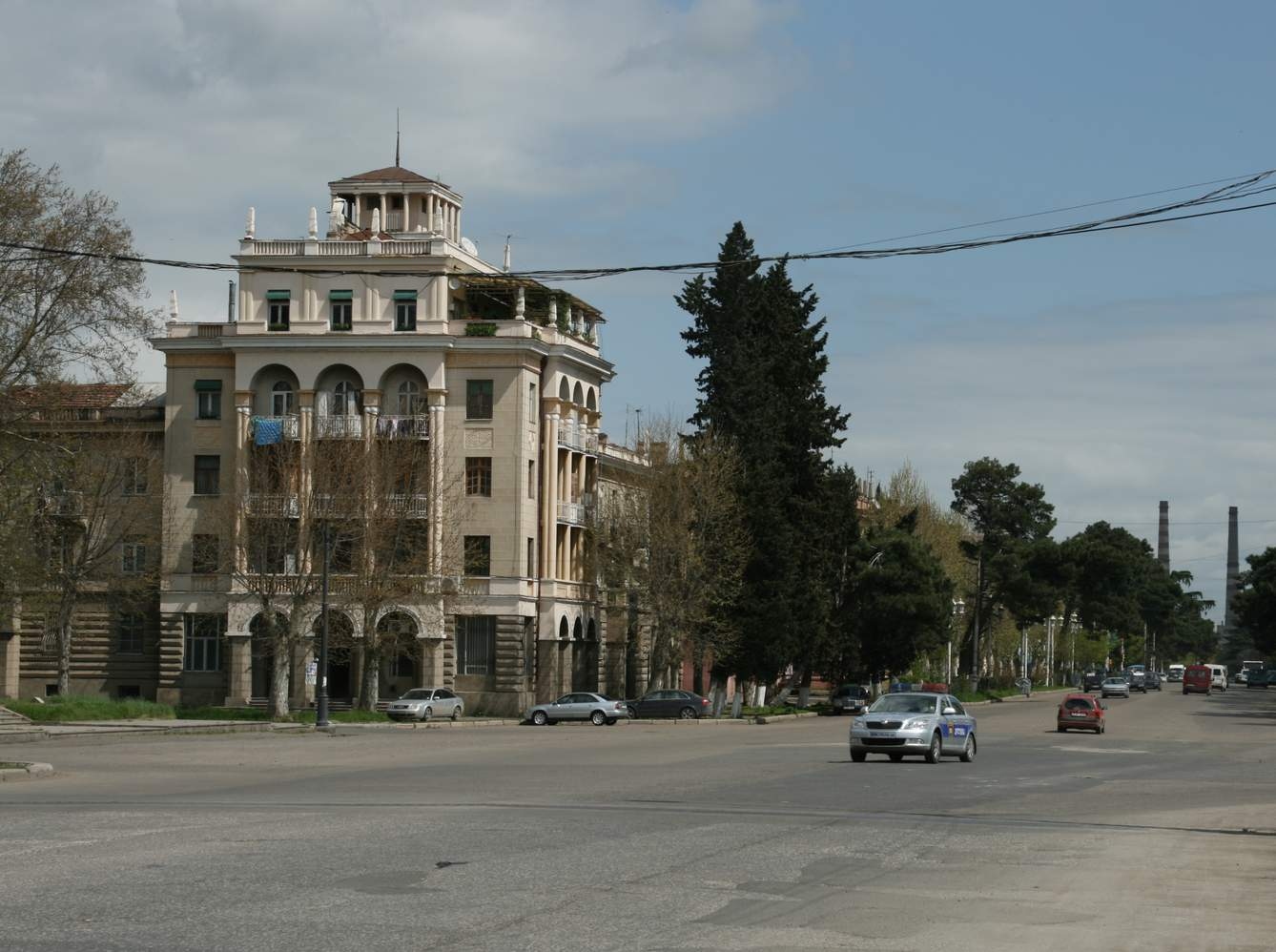
Kostava Street, Rustavi

Rustavi was rebuilt as a major industrial center during the Soviet era. The development of Rustavi was part of Joseph Stalin's accelerated industrialization process, and included ironworks, steelworks, chemical plants and an important railway station on the Tbilisi–Baku railroad line. Rustavi is the site of approximately 90 large and medium-sized industrial plants.

The core of the city's industrial activity was the Rustavi Metallurgical Plant, constructed in 1941–1950 to process iron ore from nearby Azerbaijan. Stalin brought workers from various regions in Georgia, specifically from the poorer rural provinces of Western Georgia. Rustavi became a key industrial center for the Transcaucasus region. The industrial activity expanded to include the manufacture of steel products, cement, chemicals, and synthetic fibers.

May 1944 was a significant time in the history of modern Rustavi. Geologists began to define the soil of the place where the metallurgical works were to be built. The area was nearly empty, and there were only temporary lodgings and slums available. Many people arrived at Rustavi, coming from different parts of Georgia. The first newspaper came out on 30 August 1944. It was called “Metallurgiisatvis” (meaning "For Metallurgy" in Georgian).

Rustavi celebrated frequent housewarming parties as many people migrated to the city each day. In 1948 the first streets were "baptized" in Rustavi. The first street was named after the Young Communist League, the second, after the builders of Rustavi, and the third, after its ancient name Bostan-Kalaki.

On 19 January 1948, a decree of the Supreme Soviet of the Georgian Soviet Socialist Republic declared Rustavi a town of republican importance. On 27 April 1950, the whole town celebrated the production of the first industrial Georgian steel. The theme of the celebration was dedicated to an ancient people whom are believed to have originally settled the area, known as the Khalibs.

German POWs who were captured in World War II were enlisted to build the city of Rustavi. Modern Rustavi is divided into five parts—Dzveli Rustavi (Old Rustavi), Akhali Rustavi (New Rustavi), Azoti, and Ialgujis-Pira (Near Ialjuga). Old Rustavi adheres to Stalinist architectural style and is on one side of the Rustavi Mtkvari bridge, while on the other side, New Rustavi is dominated by a multitude of Soviet-era block apartments. Ialjugis-Pira borders New Rustavi and is the small part of houses near the Ialjuga Mountain. Internatebi is surrounded by Old Rustavi. Its name comes from two main reasons, one being that when the quick housing was being built in the Soviet era, it was nicknamed "Internat", and two, that right around the same period, a school known as "School INTERNAT" (школа-интернат / სკოლა-ინტერნატი) was built in the same area. Most of the time however, Internat is grouped into Old Rustavi while Ialjugis-Pira into New Rustavi. AZOT ZONE (also frequently called the Industrial Zone), named after the Azot Factory, is the last zone of Rustavi before leaving the city. It consists strictly of factories, private territories, railway system, and abandoned buildings. As of today there are no residential zones in this area. Some residential houses have been built on private lands, but government-built ones are only in planning for now (speculation). The fall of the Soviet Union in 1991 proved disastrous for Rustavi, as it also caused the collapse of the integrated Soviet economy of which the city was a key part. Most of its industrial plants were shut down and 65% of the city's population became unemployed, with the attendant social problems of high crime and acute poverty that such a situation brings. The population shrank from 160,000 in the mid-1990s to 116,000 in 2002 as residents moved elsewhere in search of work.

New York-based artist Greg Lindquist (b. 1979) has documented Rustavi's crumbling concrete factories in his paintings and installations, such as the exhibition "Nonpasts" in 2010. Lindquist has also worked with Georgian collaborators, such as artist Gio Sumbadze (b. 1976), in projects that address the current social, cultural and political significance of these architectures. In 2010, the Laura Palmer Foundation staged an exhibition at the Ministry of Transportation building (Tbilisi Roads Ministry Building) in which Lindquist and Sumbadze installed paintings addressing the history of Georgia's transportation system. This BOMB magazine interview with La Toya Frazier for the exhibition "Planet of Slums" addresses many of the complexities of Lindquist's work in the Republic of Georgia.

== Demographics ==
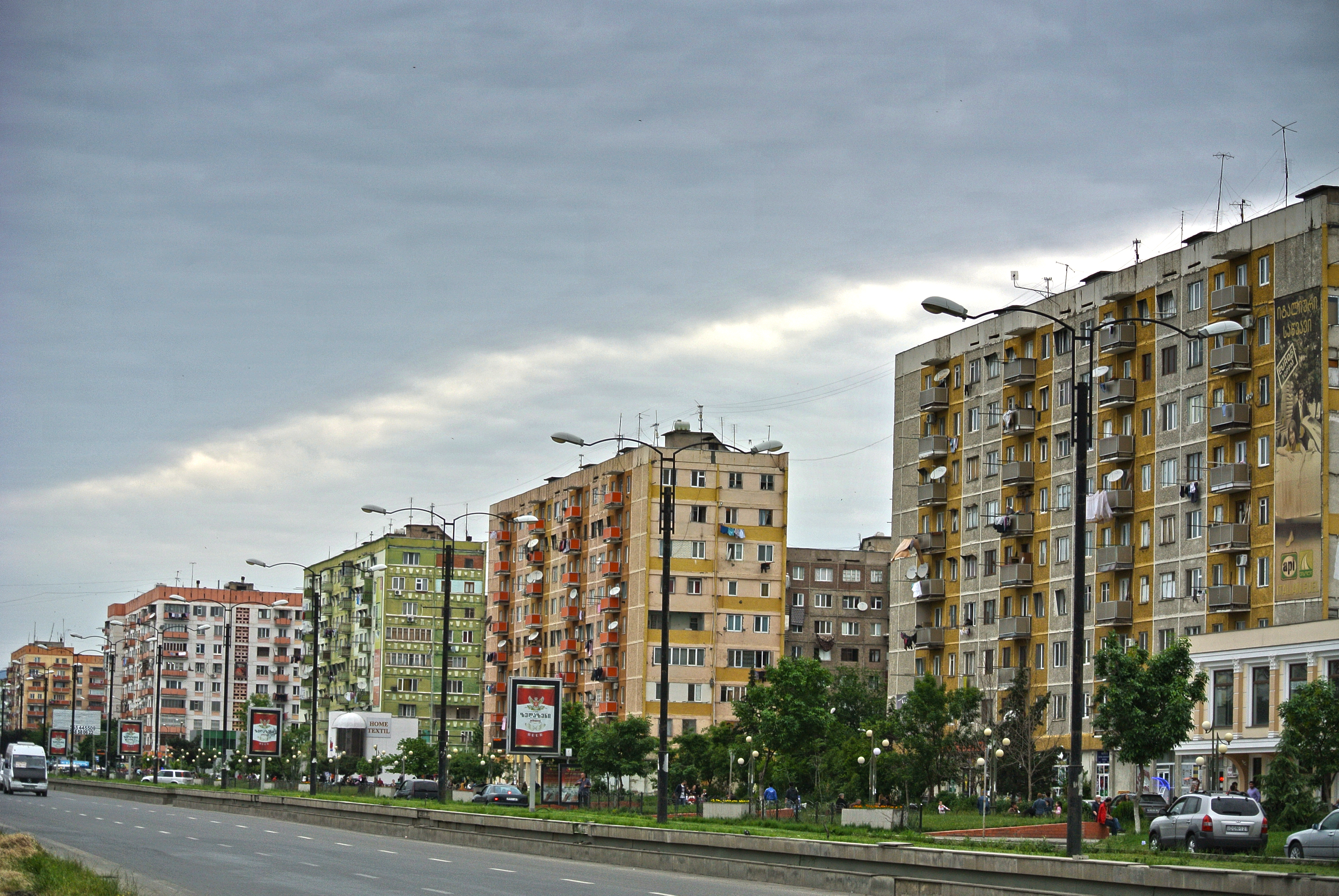
Rapid expansion under Soviet rule

At the beginning of 2021, Rustavi had more than 130,072 inhabitants, an increase of 4% since the 2014 census. This increase makes Rustavi the fourth most populous city in Georgia, just behind Kutaisi, which is suffering from ongoing contraction. Rustavi experienced rapid growth due to industrialization under Stalin. Following Georgian independence in 1991, and the years of civil war and crisis that followed, many residents emigrated due to unemployment. The low point was reached around 2002, with growth picking up in the 2010s while industrial activities and employment have resumed.

In 2014, the ethnic composition of Rustavi was almost 92% Georgian, with minority communities of Azerbaijanis (3.7%), Armenians (1.6%) and Russians (1.2%). More than 500 Ossetians (0.4%) lived in the city. Other ethnic minorities included 315 Ukrainians, 239 Yazidis, 166 Greeks, 55 Assyrians and smaller numbers of Kists, Jews, Abkhazian and Bosha.

The proportions of the ethnic minorities in the city has not always been this way. Especially in the Soviet period these were completely different, with striking numbers of Russians. The city also had a substantial Ossetian community. Migration during and after the fall of the Soviet Union and due to civil conflicts has made the city much more mono-ethnic, i.e. Georgian.

Historical ethnic composition Rustavi
Year	1959		1970		1979		1989		2002		2014		2021
Rustavi City	62,395		▲98,210		▲129,084		▲158,661		▼116,384		▲125,103		▲130,072
Georgians	27,680	44.4%	55,158	▲56.2%	79,820	▲61.8%	103,523	▲65.2%	102,151	▲87.8%	114,819	▲91.8%	
Azerbaijanis	3,693	5.9%	5,765	▼5.9%	7,443	▲5.8%	11,576	▲7.3%	4,993	▼4.3%	4,661	▼3.7%	
Armenians	4,367	7.0%	5,943	▼6.1%	6,707	▼5.2%	6,872	▼4.3%	2,809	▼2.4%	1,965	▼1.6%	
Russians	19,724	31.6%	21,610	▼22.0%	23,060	▼17.9%	21,267	▼13.4%	3,563	▼3.1%	1,459	▼1.2%	
Ossetians	1,601	2.6%	3,224	▲3.3%	4,493	▲3.5%	5,613	▲3.5%	1,410	▼1.2%	545	▼0.4%	
Note: (Note: The 2014 census found an inexplicable gap with the data from the national statistical office Geostat. UN-assisted research has found the 2002 census was inflated by about 8-9 percent. See, "1. Introduction", Page 1.)

== City governance ==
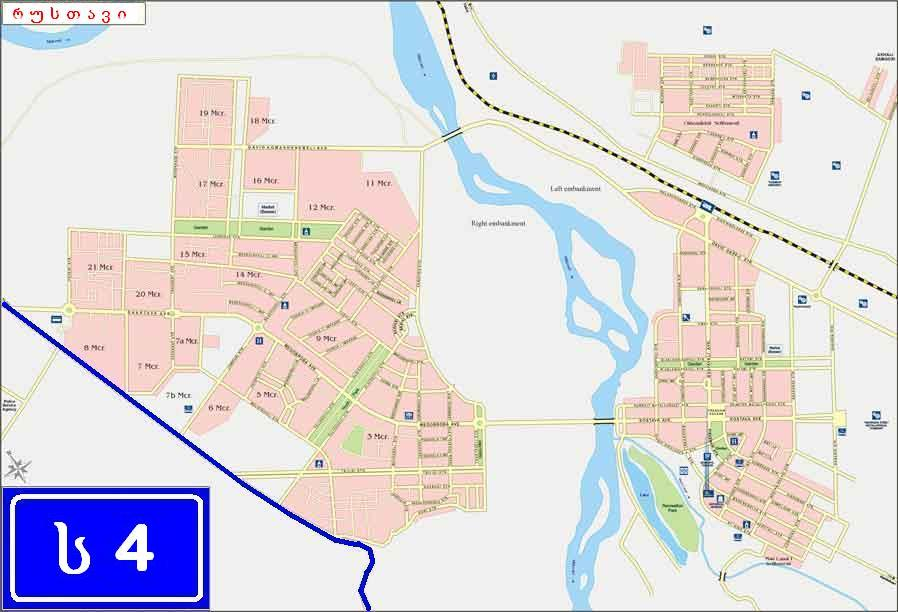
Map of Rustavi

Rustavi is a self-governing city. The representative body of the city is the City Council, and the executive body is the City Hall. Administratively, Rustavi is divided into 10 territorial bodies:

1. David Agmashenebeli district
2. Old Rustavi district
3. Shota Rustaveli district
4. Zhiuli Shartava district
5. Giorgi Chkondideli district
6. Ilia Chavchavadze district
7. Vakhtang Gorgasali district
8. Iakob Tsurtaveli district
9. Nikoloz Baratashvili district
10. district named after the 13 Assyrian fathers

=== City council ===
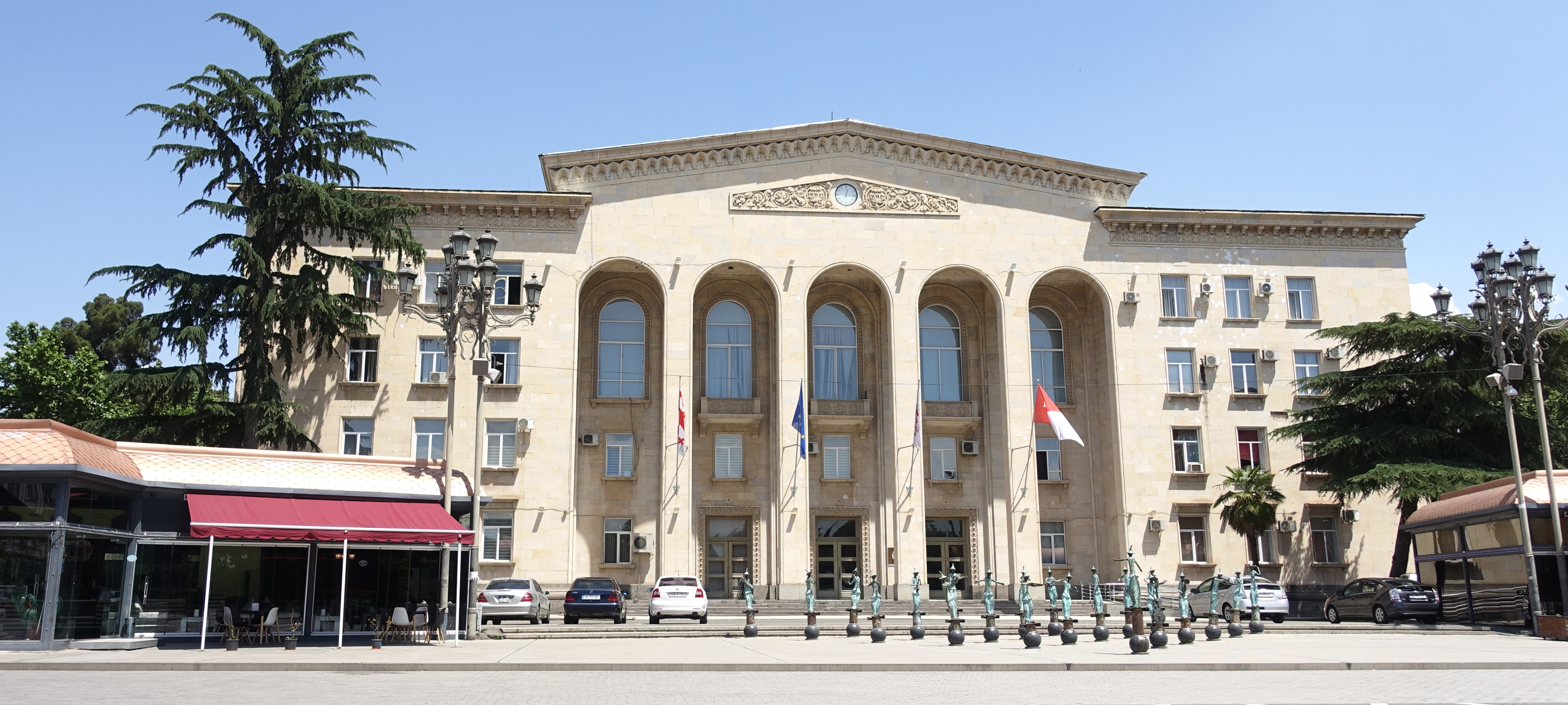
Rustavi City hall

Rustavi City Assembly (Georgian: რუსთავის საკრებულო, Rustavi Sakrebulo) is the representative body in Rustavi City that consists of 35 members as of 2021, who are elected every four years.

The last election for the sakrebulo was held in October 2021. Rustavi was one of only seven municipalities where the ruling Georgian Dream party failed to secure a council majority in 2021.

Party	2017	2021	Current Municipal Assembly
Georgian Dream	16	16	
United National Movement	3	11	
For Georgia	1 (Note: Split from GD.)	3	
Lelo		2 (Note: Davit Suladze and Nino Suladze - left UNM and joined Lelo.)	
Independent		3 (Note: Aleksandre Beridze, Vazha Morgoshia and Zurab Beradze - split from UNM.)	
European Georgia	2		
Alliance of Patriots	1		
Labour Party	1		
People's Party	1 (Note: Levan Oniani - left GD and joined People's Party.)		
Total	25	35	

=== Mayor ===
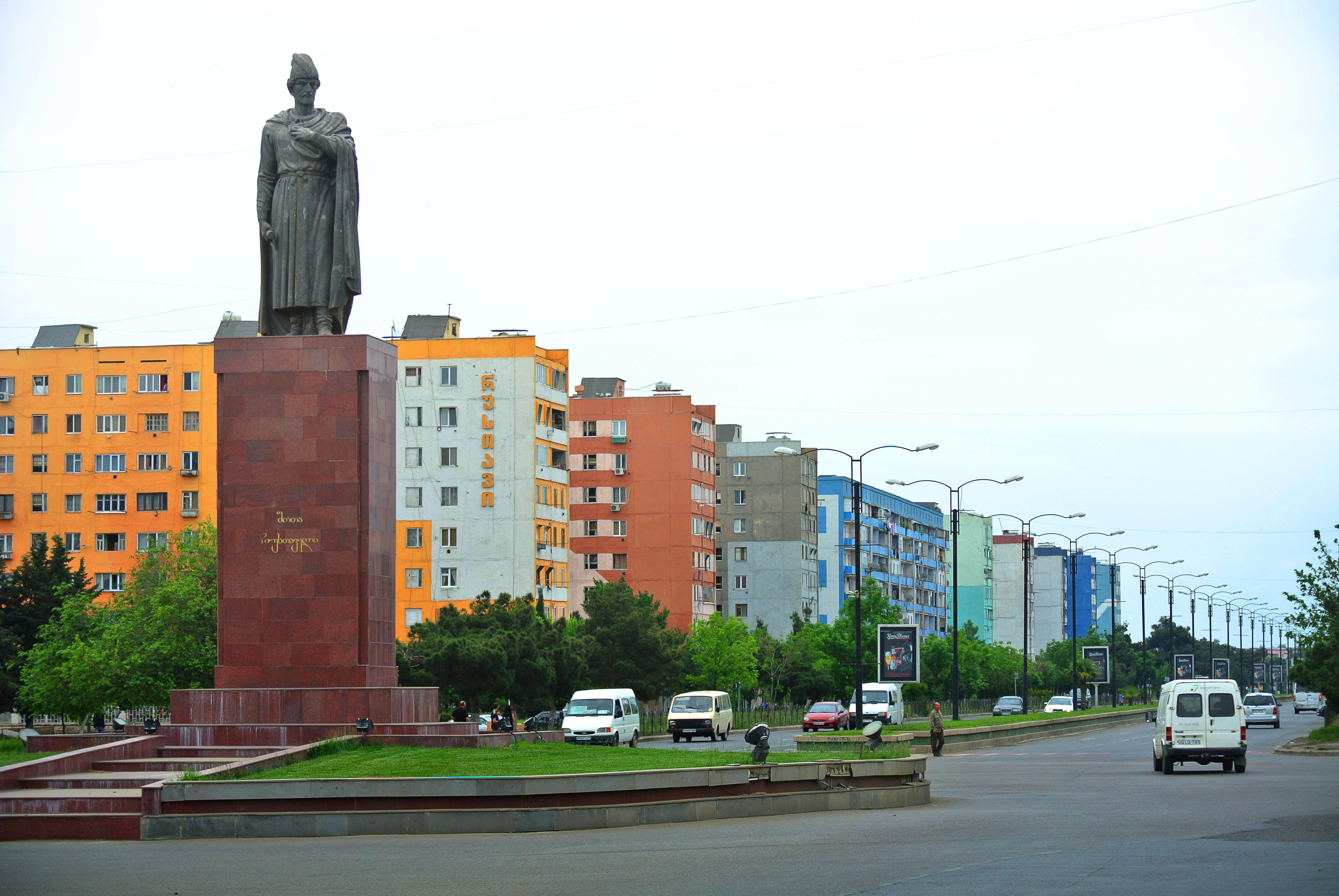
Statue of Shota Rustaveli

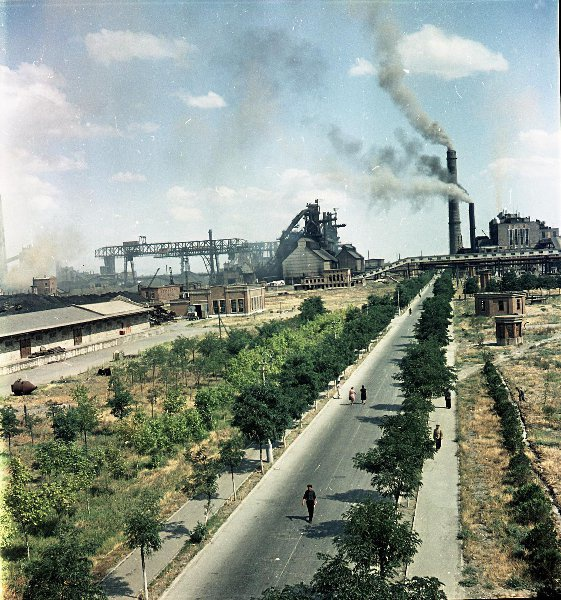
view of the Rustavi Metallurgical Plant. 1957

The most recent mayoral election was held on 2 October 2021, with a runoff on 30 October which Nino Latsabidze (Georgian Dream) won from Davit Kirkitadze (United National Movement).

The results were as follows:

Candidate	Party	First round		Second round	
Candidate	Party	Votes	%	Votes	%
Nino Latsabidze	Georgian Dream	22,352	44.84	27,298	53.71
Davit Kirkitadze	United National Movement	21,706	43.54	23,523	46.29
Beqa Liluashvili	For Georgia	3,401	6.82		
Tornike Arevadze	Alliance of Patriots	1,231	2.47		
Vazha Bakhturidze	European Democrats	751	1.51		
Elguja Kochiashvili	"Whites"	408	0.82		
Total		49,849	100.00	50,821	100.00
Valid votes		49,849	95.57	50,821	95.84
Invalid/blank votes		2,308	4.43	2,205	4.16
Total votes		52,157	100.00	53,026	100.00
Registered voters/turnout		106,895	48.79	106,869	49.62
Source: CEC, CEC

Previously elected mayors of Rustavi (Note: Prior to the 2014 Local self-governance reform, mayors were elected by the city assembly.)

- Irakli Tabagua (GD) (2017–2021)
- Davit Jikia (GD) (2014–2017)

== Climate ==
Rustavi has a humid subtropical climate (Köppen climate classification: Cfa) with hot summers and relatively cold winters.

Climate data for Rustavi
Month	Jan	Feb	Mar	Apr	May	Jun	Jul	Aug	Sep	Oct	Nov	Dec	Year
Mean daily maximum °C (°F)	6.3 (43.3)	7.9 (46.2)	12.4 (54.3)	19.6 (67.3)	24.8 (76.6)	28.6 (83.5)	31.9 (89.4)	31.6 (88.9)	27.0 (80.6)	20.3 (68.5)	13.4 (56.1)	8.2 (46.8)	19.3 (66.8)
Daily mean °C (°F)	2.0 (35.6)	3.4 (38.1)	7.3 (45.1)	13.6 (56.5)	18.6 (65.5)	22.5 (72.5)	25.8 (78.4)	25.4 (77.7)	21.1 (70.0)	14.8 (58.6)	8.8 (47.8)	4.0 (39.2)	13.9 (57.1)
Mean daily minimum °C (°F)	−2.3 (27.9)	−1.1 (30.0)	2.2 (36.0)	7.6 (45.7)	12.5 (54.5)	16.4 (61.5)	19.8 (67.6)	19.3 (66.7)	15.3 (59.5)	9.4 (48.9)	4.3 (39.7)	−0.3 (31.5)	8.6 (47.5)
Average precipitation mm (inches)	21 (0.8)	27 (1.1)	32 (1.3)	46 (1.8)	75 (3.0)	69 (2.7)	41 (1.6)	40 (1.6)	37 (1.5)	41 (1.6)	34 (1.3)	22 (0.9)	485 (19.2)
Source: Climate-Data.org

== Sports ==
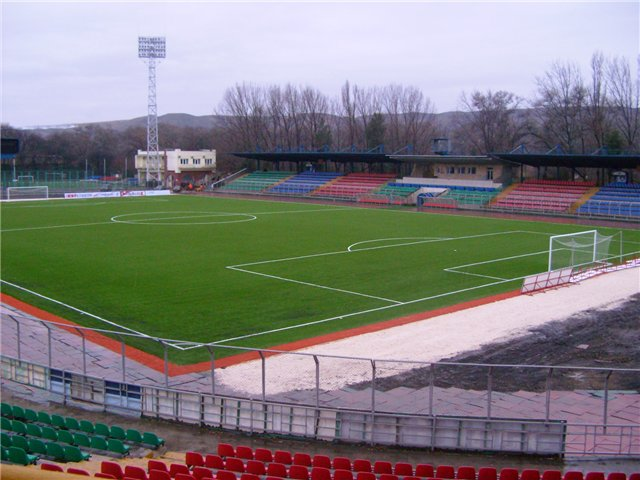
Poladi Stadium

=== Rustavi Race Circuit ===
The last of the racetracks built in the USSR. Competitions started in the end of 1979 and the track hosted eleven USSR Championship events until 1989. Prior to 2009 the condition of the track had deteriorated. That same year the area was sold to the private company Stromos on the State auction. After total reconstruction in 2011–2012, the track reopened and has hosted a number of racing events, such as the TCR International Series, Formula Alfa series, Legends championship, BMW Annual Festival, drag and drift competitions, amateur races and many more.

=== Basketball ===
The city is home to the basketball club BC Rustavi of the Georgian Superliga. It plays its home games in the Rustavi sports arena.

=== Martial arts ===
The Shavparosnebi (Blackshields) is an active studio with traditional sport and martial arts competitions.

== Notable people ==
- Robert Tedeyev (born 1986), former Russian professional football player
- Davit Zirakashvili (born 1983), former Georgian rugby union player

== Twin towns – sister cities ==
Rustavi is twinned with:

- Akmenė, Lithuania
- Cherkasy, Ukraine
- İnegöl, Turkey
- Ivano-Frankivsk, Ukraine
- Kiruna, Sweden
- Kryvyi Rih, Ukraine
- Łódź, Poland
- Panevėžys, Lithuania
- Płock, Poland
- Sumqayit, Azerbaijan
- Zhodzina, Belarus

== See also ==
- List of monuments in Rustavi
- Rustavi City Assembly
- Internati
- Rustavi 2, television broadcasting company
- Rustavi Steel
- Rustavi International Motorpark
