= Tsinagari =

Tsinagari Georgian: წინაგარი Iron Ossetic: Амдзарин
- Village
- Interactive map of Tsinagari
- Coordinates: 42°04′41″N 44°17′18″E
- Elevation: 800 m (2,600 ft)

Population (2015)
  - Total: 345

Tsinagari (Georgian: წინაგარი; Iron Ossetic: Цъинагар), also known by its Ossetian name Amzarin (Iron Ossetic: Амдзарин) is a village in the partially recognized Republic of South Ossetia close to the border with Georgia in the Akhalgori Municipality, which South Ossetia refers to as the Leningor district.

== Geography ==
Tsinagari is located on the Tiripon Plain at the southwestern edge of the Akhalgori Municipality and is one of the Municipality's most developed settlements.

== History ==
Between South Ossetia's independence in 1991 and the 2008 Russo Georgian War, Tsinagari was the capital of the South Ossetian Leningor district. Following the 2008 war and South Ossetia's conquest of Georgian held Akhalgori Municipality the capital of the district was moved to Akhalgori.

=== Secondary school ===
Between 2020 and 2022 the village became the center of a dispute as the secondary school's gym, which was built by the South Ossetian Ministry of Construction, never had a transformer installed rendering it without electricity and inoperable. The school's administrator and former member of the Parliament of South Ossetia Lasko Gussoev lobbied extensively for the transformer, arguing that the lack of government communication was a sign of incumbent President Anatoly Bibilov's corruption or incompetence. Additionally, the school, which was built in 1970 and has seen no renovations, has been the subject of a proposed major renovation which has not been granted by governmental authorities.

== Demographics ==
Historical population
Year	1959	2015
Pop.	672	345
±%	—	−48.7%

According to the 1959 Soviet census, the majority of residents where ethnically Ossetian.
