= Gantiadi Church =

Christian church in Gantiadi, Gagra district, Georgia

Gantiadi Church განთიადის ტაძარი (in Georgian) Ганҭиади иҟоу аныхабаа (in Abkhaz)
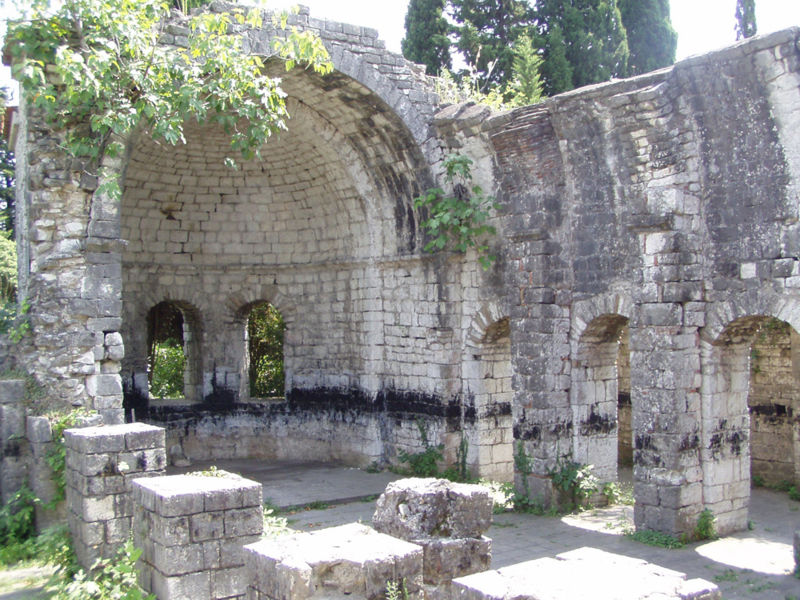
- Ruins of Gantiadi Church

- Location within Abkhazia Location within Georgia

Religion
- Affiliation: Georgian Orthodox
- Province: Abkhazia
- Ecclesiastical or organisational status: ruins

Location
- Location: Gantiadi, Gagra District, Abkhazia, Georgia
- Coordinates: 43°22′45″N 40°04′15″E

Architecture
- Type: Church
- Completed: 6th century

The Gantiadi Church or Tsandripshi Church (Georgian: განთიადის ტაძარი; Abkhaz: Ганҭиади иҟоу аныхабаа) is a 6th-century three-apse basilica, located in the settlement of Gantiadi (Gagra District) in Abkhazia, a disputed region of Georgia.

== History ==
The church was built in 543 AD by the Byzantine Emperor Justinian I (527-565) when Abazg tribes had been Christianized.

The church building was altered several times in 8th–10th centuries. In 1576 it was partly destroyed by Ottoman invaders. It is one of the oldest Christian temples in the Western Caucasus. Nowadays only the ruins of the basilica are left standing.

In the ruins of the basilica a fragment of a tombstone bearing a Greek uncial inscription was found. It seems most likely that the inscription belonged to the tomb of a clerical or secular dignitary of Abkhazia. The name of the person interred is lost. The inscription is dated to the 6th century. The church is a three-nave basilica, built of medium-size limestone ashlar masonry of regular shape, and flat bricks of varied sizes.

The Gantiadi Church has been designated a monument of national significance.

== Literature ==
- Jaoshvili, V.; Rcheulishvili, L. (1977). "განთიადი" (PDF). Georgian Soviet Encyclopedia (in Georgian). Vol. 2. Tbilisi. p. 680.
- Cultural Heritage in Abkhazia, Tbilisi, 2015
