= List of monuments in Rustavi =

This is a list of monuments in Rustavi, Georgia, which are listed on the Ministry of Culture and Monument Protection of Georgia.

== List ==
| Name of object | Location | Coordinates | ID | Photo | Upload |
|---|---|---|---|---|---|
| Rustavi Fortress | Rustavi | | 5978 | Rustavi Fortress | Upload Photo |
| Rustavi Urban archaeology | Rustavi, Bostankalaki and Akaki Tsereteli area between the streets | | 5979 | | Upload Photo |
| Rustavi Theater | Rustavi, Pirosmani str. №7 | | 7136 | Rustavi Theater | Upload Photo |
| Dwelling house | Rustavi, M. Kostava str. №1 | | 7137 | Dwelling house | Upload Photo |
| Dwelling house | Rustavi, M. Kostava str. №2 | | 7138 | Dwelling house | Upload Photo |
| Dwelling house | Rustavi, M. Kostava str. №18 | | 7139 | Dwelling house | Upload Photo |
| Dwelling house | Rustavi, M. Kostava str. №19 | | 7140 | Dwelling house | Upload Photo |
| Dwelling house | Rustavi, M. Kostava str. №21 | | 7141 | Dwelling house | Upload Photo |
| Dwelling house | Rustavi, M. Kostava str. №22 | | 7142 | Dwelling house | Upload Photo |
| Rustavi Cultural and Recreation Park | Rustavi | | 7151 | Rustavi Cultural and Recreation Park | Upload Photo |

== See also ==
- List of monuments in Georgia
