= Kelasuri Architectural Complex =

Ruined medieval Christian church complex in Abkhazia

Coordinates: 43.0464°N 41.1007°E

Kelasuri Architectural Complex is a ruined medieval Christian church complex in Abkhazia, an entity in the South Caucasus with a disputed political status. It is located in the village of Kelasuri, to the north-east of the city of Sukhumi.

The monument is dated to the 11th-14th centuries. Its main part is a large hall church located in the center of the complex, with its dome long collapsed. It had a central nave and two side chambers. There were two doorways, one on the north and the other on the south. The interior was once frescoed as evidenced by colored shreds found in the debris on the floor. Adjacent to this church there are remnants of a small chapel and various other structures, which are of relatively later date. The whole complex was encircled with a massive rock fence with an arched entrance, overlooking the nearby river embankment. The first archaeological digs at the site were conducted in 1885 by the Georgian colonel in the Russian Imperial service, Nikolay Tsilossani, who found a number of church items and fragments of a bell with a Latin inscription. To the south of the ruined monastery, in the upper part of a limestone cliff there are fragments of old walls built to cover a natural cave, which might have served as a hermitage.
