= Lomisa church =

Church building in Dusheti Municipality, Georgia

Lomisa
- ლომისა
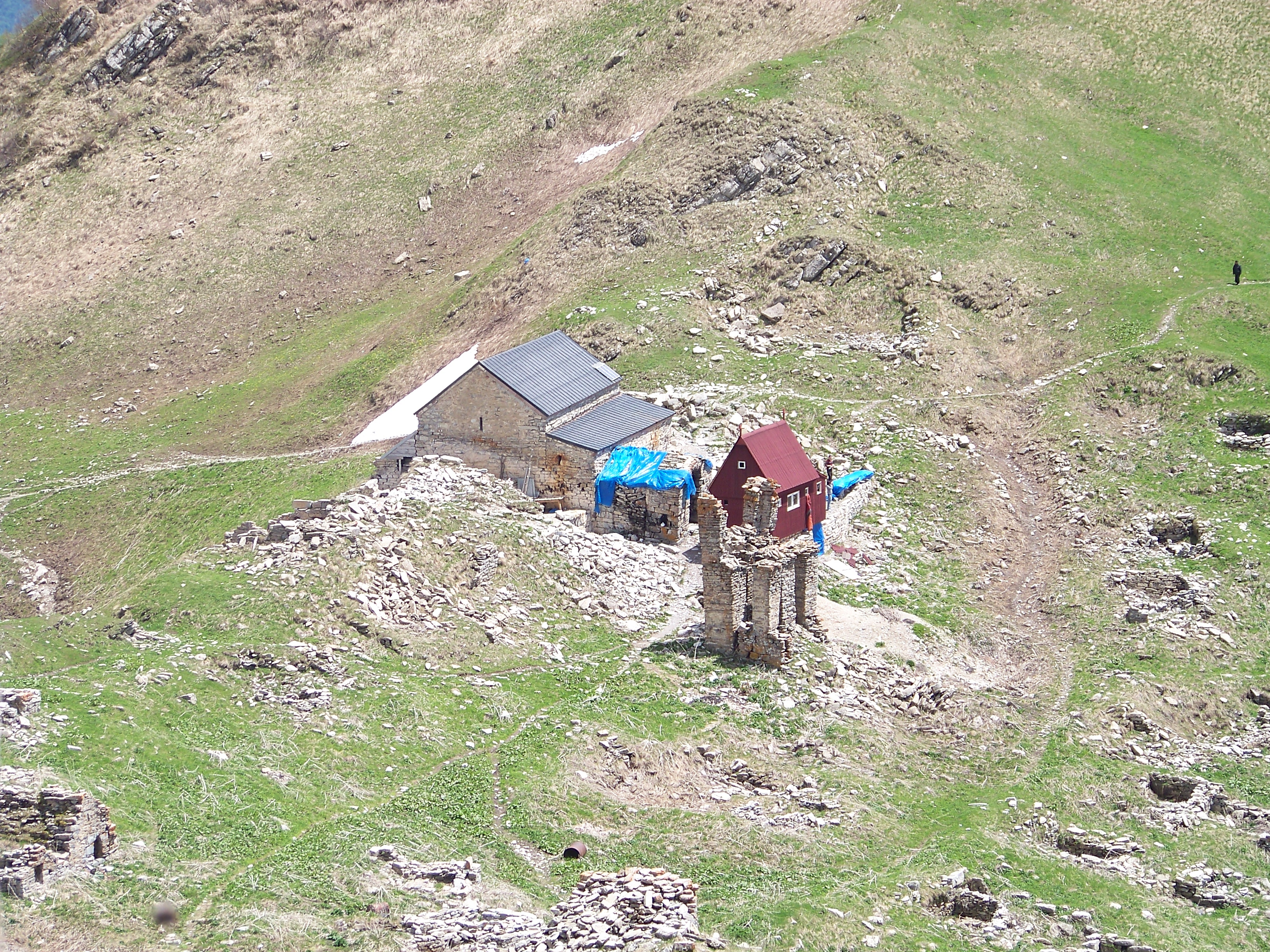
- Lomisa
- Interactive map of Lomisa
- Location: Mount Lomisa, Dusheti Municipality, Mtskheta-Mtianeti, Georgia
- Coordinates: 42.411935°N 44.499539°E
- Type: Hall church

The Lomisa church (Georgian: ლომისა) is a medieval Christian shrine in eastern Georgia, dedicated to Saint George. It is a simple stone hall church built in the 9th or 10th century. Located at about 2,200 m (7,218 ft) above sea level on a mountain ridge—the watershed between the Ksani and Aragvi valleys—Lomisa is the principal shrine for the highland province of Mtiuleti and neighboring communities as well as the scene of an annual festival on the Wednesday after Pentecost, which features a mass sacrificial slaughter of animals. Due to its historic and cultural significance, the church is inscribed on the list of Georgia's Immovable Cultural Monuments of National Significance.

== Location and architecture ==
The Lomisa shrine tops a high mountainous pass in the Dusheti Municipality, some 7 km south of the village of Kvemo Mleta and 18 km northwest of the small town of Pasanauri as the crow flies. The Lomisi or Alevi mountain, on which the church is located, overlooks the Aragvi valley in the historical district of Mtiuleti, now administratively part of Georgia's Mtskheta-Mtianeti region, to the north and a portion of the Ksani valley to the south, which fell under the control of breakaway South Ossetia during the Russo-Georgian War of August 2008.

Lomisa is a simple hall church, measuring 14.5 × 7.8 m, built of undressed stone. The original edifice dates to the 9th or 10th century. There are two annexes which were constructed later, to the south and to the north. Parts of the church have fallen to ruin, making the building partly buried in the soil and debris. The interior has been remodeled several times in the course of history. In the extant church, the vaulted ceiling rests on the arch sustained by pilasters. The longitudinal walls feature niches. The church building is surrounded by ruins of various structures, including the ragged columns of what once was a two-storey bell-tower to the south of the church.

== History ==
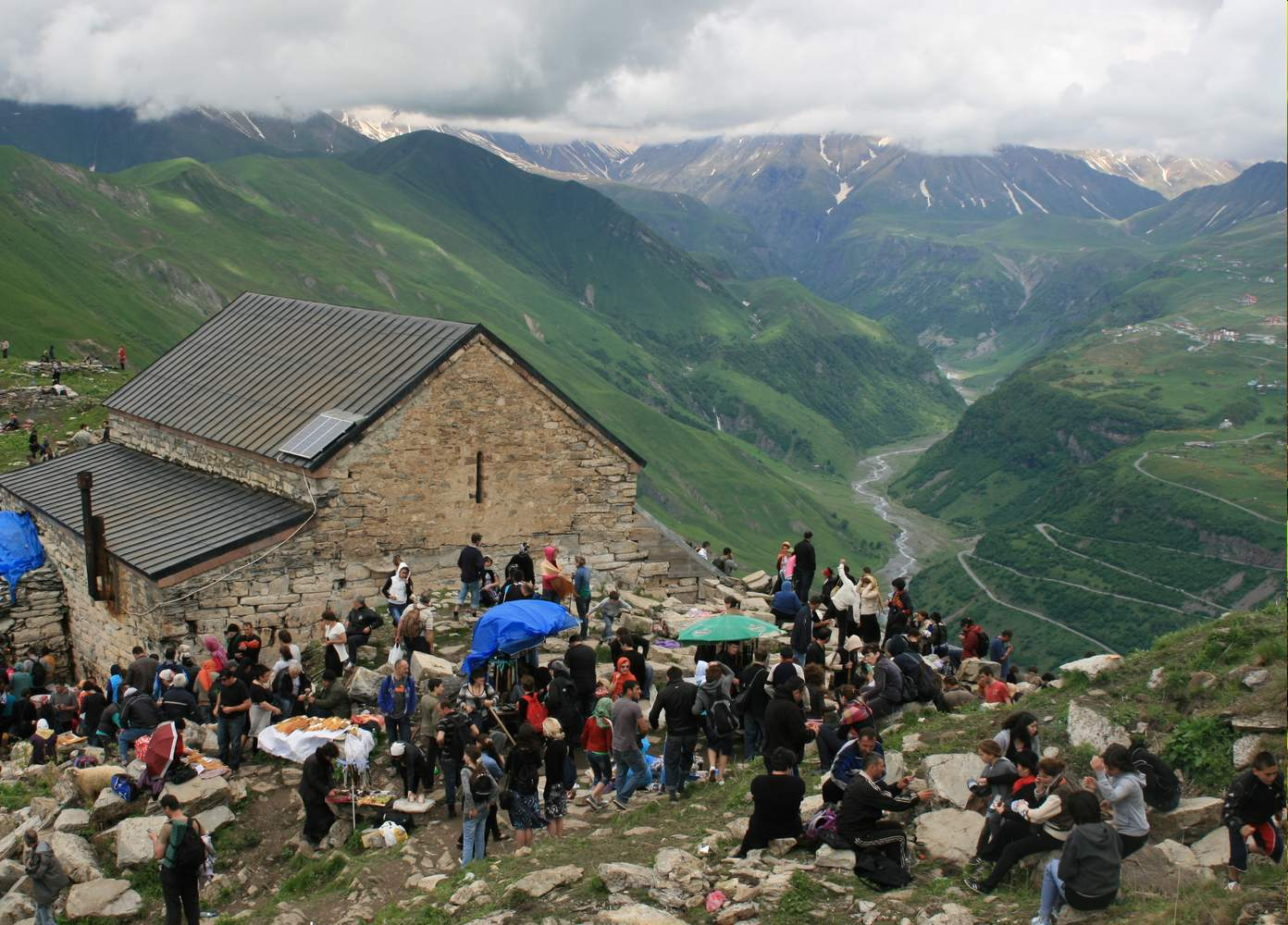
The Lomisa church during the 2011 festival.

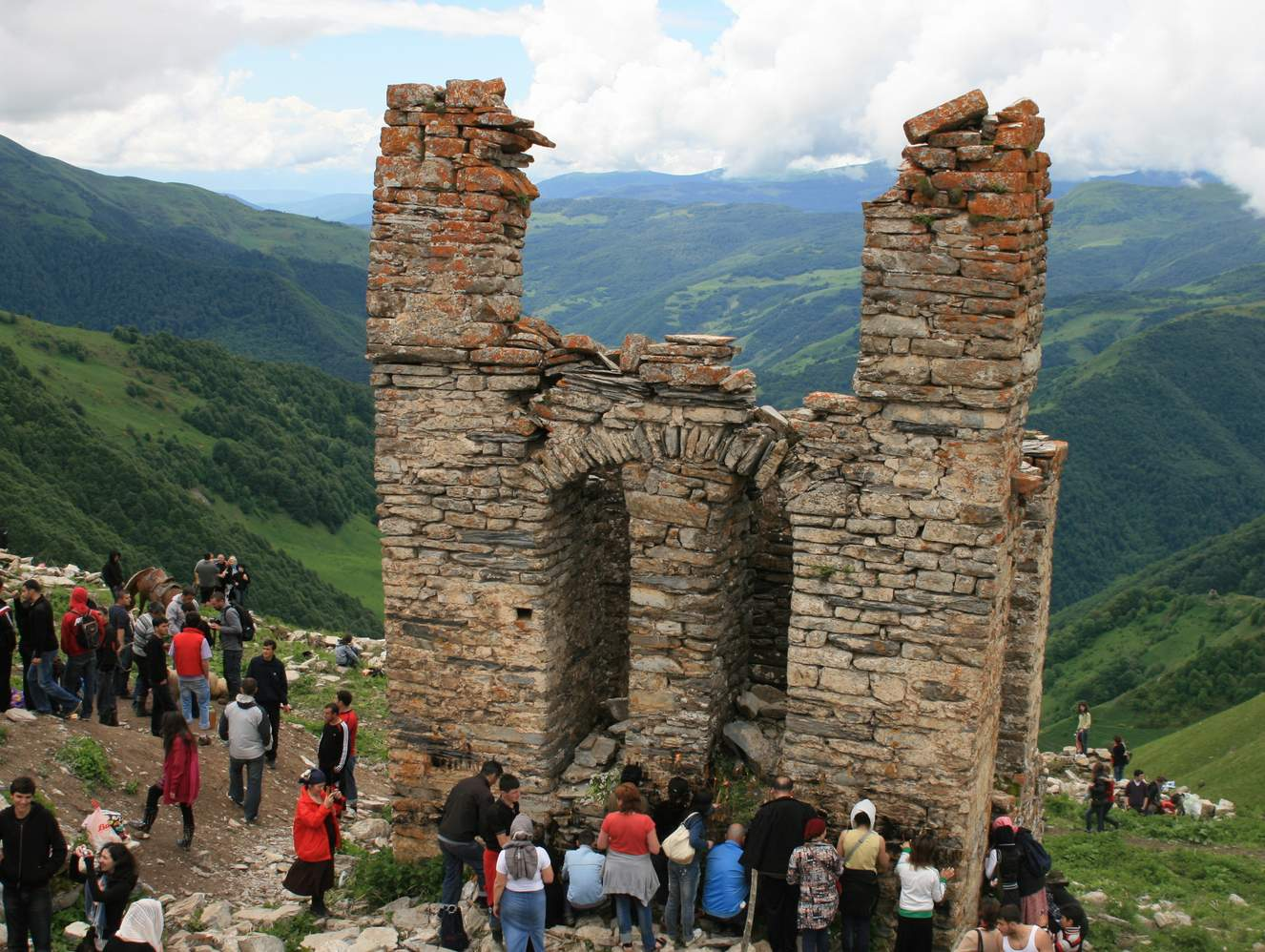
Ruins of a bell-tower at Lomisa.

Lomisa features in many local legends and folktales. It is said that the church was built here to commemorate the deliverance of 7,000 Georgians from the Chorasmian captivity through the miraculous intervention of the icon of Saint George which was mounted on an ox called Loma ("a lion"). Another legend has it that a captain of a royal detachment incurred the wrath of the icon when he chopped the church door for firewood: the soldiers were blinded and their eyesight would not return until the captain promised to donate an iron door to the church. An ironclad oakwood door—with the 16th–17th-century Georgian inscriptions—is still kept inside the church. The church also features an old massive iron chain which believers put around the neck and walk round the shrine three times counterclockwise to make a promise or a wish.

Lomisa has historically been the most sacred Christian shrine for the eastern Georgian mountaineers and their most binding oath was by Saint George of Lomisa. It was the place where the locals would gather and deliberate on the matters of war and peace. The church enjoyed patronage from the Georgian royalty and nobility. It also appears to have owned serfs. In the 1320s, King George V of Georgia stopped at Lomisa to pray before St. George on his way back from a journey to the Darial Gorge. This king specially issued a set of laws to regulate conditions in the mountain valleys; one of the clauses had it that a murderer of a peasant of Lomisa presented thereto by the king or by anyone was to be fined with 1,500 pieces of silver.

The Lomisa shrine preserved many church items, such icons, crosses, banners, and various utensils. Prince Vakhushti of Kartli, compiling his geography of Georgia around 1745, wrote that the church safeguarded "numerous icons and crosses, of gold and silver". Some of these surviving items have been removed for preservation to safer and more accessible places, such as a church in Mleta or museums in Tbilisi. Among them are utensils donated by the eristavi ("dukes") of Aragvi and a silver candle holder presented to the Lomisa church by Princess Ketevan (1744–1808), wife of the Georgian royal prince Vakhtang, praying St. George of Lomisa to grant them children in an inscription on the item.

== Lomisoba ==
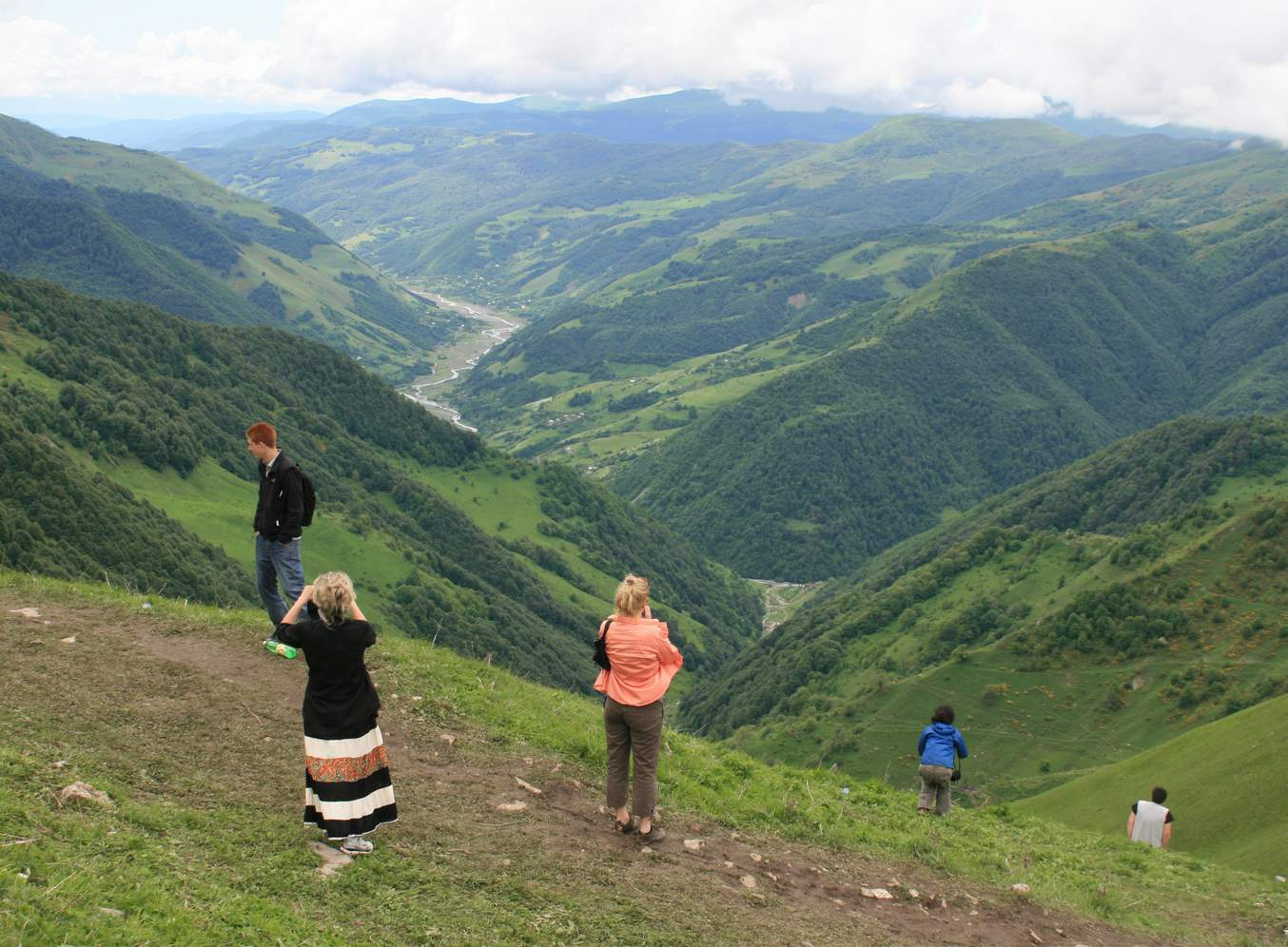
Georgian pilgrims at Lomisi look over the Ksani valley, separated from the rest of Georgia by the Russian border guards since 2008.

The Lomisa church hosts an annual festival, known as Lomisoba (literally, "of/related to Lomisa"), probably a remnant of an ancient pre-Christian cult superimposed by the veneration of St. George. Every year, on the Wednesday after Pentecost, thousands of people from various regions of Georgia, especially Mtiuleti, Khevi, and Khevsureti, make a pilgrimage up to the Lomisa church. There are specific rituals for healing the sick and for seeking fertility for childless women. There is a round dance performed, with a song that describes the legend of the heavy chain that hangs in the church and is worn by pilgrims. The festival also features a large-scale ritual animal sacrifice, in which hundreds of livestock, especially sheep, are slaughtered down in the valley, not far from the church. In the 2010s, the tradition has been increasingly criticized by animal rights activists, but the locals have rejected the calls to abandon it. The Georgian Orthodox clergy have stated that the Church "prefers unbloody sacrifice" but does not forbid the tradition of animal killing and concomitant supra (feast).
