= Lidzava =

Lidzava ლიძავა (Georgian)
- Village (and municipality)
- Location in Georgia Lidzava (Abkhazia)
- Coordinates: 43°10′26″N 40°22′20″E
- Country: Georgia
- Partially recognized independent country: Abkhazia
- District: Gagra

Government
  - Mayor: Eldar Ampar (Note: "Администрация городов, сёл и посёлков Гагрского района". Gagra District Administration.)
  - Deputy Mayor: Ardon Dolbaia
- Time zone: UTC+3 (MSK)

Lidzava (Georgian: ლიძავა; Abkhaz: Лӡаа) is a village in the Gagra District of Abkhazia, (Note: The political status of Abkhazia is disputed. Having unilaterally declared independence from Georgia in 1992, Abkhazia is formally recognised as an independent state by 4 UN member states (three other states previously recognised it but then withdrew their recognition), while the remainder of the international community recognizes it as de jure Georgian territory. Georgia continues to claim the area as its own territory, designating it as Russian-occupied territory.) Georgia.

== History ==
In 1868, the village had 177 Christian residents and 10 Muslim ones.

== See also ==
- Gagra District
