= List of monuments in Ochamchire Municipality =

The monuments in the Ochamchire Municipality is a group of cultural heritage sites registered by the government of Georgia on the territory of a de jure territorial unit, which corresponds to the Ochamchira District in southwestern Abkhazia. (Note: The political status of Abkhazia is disputed. Having unilaterally declared independence from Georgia in 1992, Abkhazia is formally recognised as an independent state by 5 UN member states (two other states previously recognised it but then withdrew their recognition), while the remainder of the international community recognizes it as de jure Georgian territory. Georgia continues to claim the area as its own territory, designating it as Russian-occupied territory.)

The table lists a monument, its location and dating as well as the status attached to it by the Georgian authorities and the number assigned in the registry by the National Agency for Cultural Heritage Preservation of Georgia, which is available online as a GIS portal. The Agency broadly classifies the heritage sites into three groups: 1) the objects without a status, 2) immovable monuments of cultural heritage, and 3) immovable monuments of national significance.

Object	National Registry number	Date of construction	Location	Status	Image
Abaakhibri Tower		Middle Ages	Abaakhibri		
Atara Church of Saint George		19th century	Atara		
Akvaskia Tower		Middle Ages	Akvaskia		
Aradu Church		Late Middle Ages	Aradu		
Atara Former Settlement		Bronze Age	Atara		
Adzyubzha Church Marlmalabaa	3543	Late Middle Ages	Adzyubzha	Cultural Monument	
Akhutsa Tower			Akhutsa		
Akhutsa Grave Field			Akhutsa		
Akhutsa Cemetery			Akhutsa		
Akhutsa Fortress	7562	Middle Ages	Jgerda-Akhutsa	Culturual Monument	
Ajamphazar Church		Middle Ages	Ajamphazar		
Bedia Cathedral	3542	10th century		Immovable Cultural Monuments of National Significance	
Bedia Church of Saint George		Middle Ages	Ghvada		
Beslakhuba Church	7563	Middle Ages	Beslakhuba	Cultural Monument	
Gufi Church	7569	Middle Ages	Gufi	Cultural Monument	
Church in Mokvi Village		Middle Ages	Around Mokvi		
Mur-Aba Church			Pokveshi		
Zegani Church		Middle Ages	Zegani		
Ilori Church	3544	11th century	Ilori	Immovable Cultural Monuments of National Significance	
Katsihabla Church		Middle Ages	Katsihabla		
Kvitouli Wall	7565	Middle Ages	Kvitouli	Cultural Monument	
Kvitouli Castle	7574	Middle Ages	Kvitouli	Cultural Monument	
Kvitouli Aqueduct	7564	Middle Ages	Kvitouli	Cultural Monument	
Lashkendari Church		Middle Ages	Tkvarcheli		
Marmariskari Church		Late Middle Ages	Marmariskari		
Mishveli Church "Pitchu-Okhvame"		Late Middle Ages	Mishveli		
Mokvi Cathedral	3545	10th century	Mokvi	Immovable Cultural Monuments of National Significance	
Ochamchire Hall Church			Ochamchire		
Ochamchire Tower			Ochamchire		
Ochamchire Urban Archaeology		4th millennium BC-2th millennium BC	Ochamchire		
Ochamchire Stone Building and Wall			Ochamchire		
Tamishi Hill		Bronze Age	Tamishi		
Tamishi Church		19th century	Tamishi		
Pokveshi Basilica			Pokveshi		
Pokveshi Church "Abaa"	7568	Middle Ages	Pokveshi	Cultural Monument	
Pokveshi Ghomi Furnace			Pokveshi		
Pokveshi Fortress		Middle Ages	Pokveshi		
Pokveshi Spring			Pokveshi		
Kvitouli Church of Kiachi		7th–9th centuries	Jgerda-Akhutsa		
Kochara Wall			Kochara		
Ghvada Church		Middle Ages	Ghvada		
Ghvada Tower		Middle Ages	Ghvada		
Ghvada Fortress		Middle Ages	Ghvada		
Chlou Church			Chlou		
Chlou Tower		Middle Ages	Chlou		
Chlou Holy Cross Church		Middle Ages	Chlou		
Jali Wall		Middle Ages	Jali		
Jali Church			Jali		
Jali Secular Building			Jali		
Jgerda Adagua Mountain Church	7568	Middle Ages	Jgerda	Cultural Monument	
Jgerda Palace	7571	Middle Ages	Jgerda	Cultural Monument	
Jgerda Pskali Mountain Church		6th–7th centuries	Jgerda		
Jgerda Tomb		Bronze Age	Jgerda		
Jgerda Fortress	7572	Middle Ages	Jgerda	Cultural Monument	
Jirghuli Church		Late Middle Ages	Jirghuli		

== See also ==
- List of Cultural Heritage Monuments of Georgia
