= Afro-Abkhazians =

Small African-related sub-ethnic group in Abkhazia

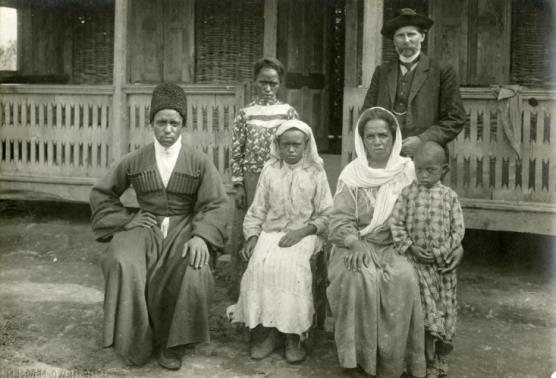
- Afro-Abkhazian family, c. 1912

Total population
- Unknown

Regions with significant populations
- Possibly Adzyubzha

Languages
- Abkhaz

Afro-Abkhazians (Abkhaz: Аԥсуа негрцәа, romanized: Aṕsua negrcəa) are a small sub-ethnic group of people of African descent in Abkhazia, (Note: The political status of Abkhazia is disputed. Having unilaterally declared independence from Georgia in 1992, Abkhazia is formally recognised as an independent state by 4 UN member states (three other states previously recognised it but then withdrew their recognition), while the remainder of the international community recognizes it as de jure Georgian territory. Georgia continues to claim the area as its own territory, designating it as Russian-occupied territory.) who historically lived in Adzyubzha and other villages of Abzhua Abkhazia, although they have most likely been completely assimilated into the greater ethnicities of the area.

== History ==
=== Origin ===
E. Lavrov in 1913 first proposed that Afro-Abkhazians originated in 5th-century BC Colchis. Ancient sources including Herodotus and Jerome described Colchians as having dark skin, "wooly" hair, and an African origin. Patrick English investigated this hypothesis further in 1959, citing ancient accounts of the region as well as anthropological and linguistic evidence.

Another origin hypothesis, which is more prevalent, is that the Afro-Abkhaz were brought to Abkhazia through the Ottoman slave trade in the 17th or 18th centuries, having been purchased by Abkhazian royals. When the Ottomans withdrew from the region in the 19th century, those African slaves remaining in Abkhazia were freed.

=== Legends ===
There are a few Afro-Abkhaz legends surrounding their origin. One legend affirms the idea that the Afro-Abkhazians were brought to Abkhazia through the Ottoman slave trade, stating that they were slaves who crashed off the coast of Ankara and Kodar who were later sold, rescued and sent free to establish a colony. There are other variations of this legend, including one that states that they were slaves who were purchased by a princess of the rulers of the area, the House of Shervashidze, and then were later brought to Abkhazia.

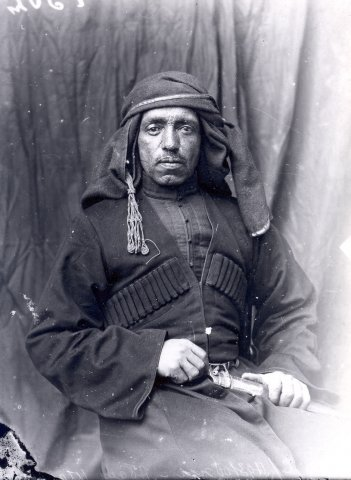
Shaaban Abash, an Afro-Abkhazian soldier of the Circassian cavalry regiment during World War I

=== 19th-century and beyond ===
By the 19th century, Afro-Abkhazians had been mostly assimilated into the local Abkhaz population and were not viewed as a diaspora community. They were therefore not recognized as a distinct community by Soviet authorities. Remaining Afro-Abkhaz villagers, who were impoverished and isolated, may have been subject to deportation to elsewhere in the Soviet Union.

Historically, the few scattered African communities in the Black Sea region were geographically isolated and unknown by the broader public. Beginning in 1913 with an article by Russian researcher and naturalist V. P. Vradii in the Tbilisi newspaper Kavkaz, the presence of African communities in Abkhazia was repeatedly reported on in Russian newspapers. Their origin and numbers were a subject of public debate in Russian media. In 1923, Soviet journalist Zinaida Richter visited an African village near Sukhumi and reported on her expedition in the Moscow newspaper Izvestia. Western periodicals also covered the subject in 1925 and 1931, when anthropologist B. Adler publicized his research in The New York Times, in which he described small Black settlements whose inhabitants were of relatively unmixed ancestry.

Soviet anthropologists took interest in the Afro-Abkhaz in the 1960s and produced several studies, although by this time the group was more dispersed and assimilated. In 1973 journalist Slava Tynes reported that there were still Afro-Abkhazian communities in villages like Adzyubzha, and noted their positive relationship with non-Black Abkhaz locals.

The descendants of the Afro-Abkhaz mostly live in Abzhua Abkhazia (Ochamchira district), in the villages Adzyubzha, Chlou, Ilori, Kyndyg, Tamishi, Tkhyna and Reka.

During the Siege of Tkvarcheli operation in the 1992–1993 Abkhazian war, Georgian troops destroyed three villages that had major Afro-Abkhazian communities: Adzyubzha, Kyndyg, and Tamishi.

== Culture ==
Afro-Abkhazians have been recognized by other Abkhazians as being ethnically Abkhaz, as they have been culturally assimilated into the greater regional ethnicity, and speak the Abkhaz language. In 1913, V. P. Vradii exposited that the Afro-Abkhaz were mostly Muslim and spoke Abkhaz.

== In popular culture ==
In the 1970s, Fazil Iskander wrote about Afro-Abkhazians and their relationships with indigenous Abkhaz, which further popularized the subject.

== See also ==
- Afro-Russians
- Afro-Turks
- African admixture in Europe
- Zana of Tkhina
- Shaaban Abash
