= Ochamchire Region =

- Ochamchire District of Georgia, now Ochamchire Municipality
- Ochamchire District of Abkhazia
