= Chlou Holy Cross Church =

Ruined medieval church in Georgia

Chlou Holy Cross Church ჭლოუს ჯვარი პატიოსანი (in Georgian)
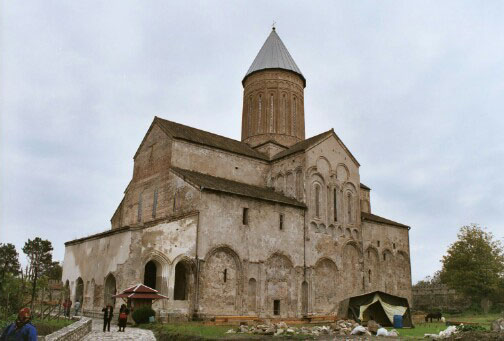

- Location within Abkhazia Location within Georgia

Religion
- Affiliation: Georgian Orthodox
- Province: Abkhazia
- Ecclesiastical or organizational status: ruins

Location
- Location: (Georgia (country)) Chlou, Ochamchire Municipality, Abkhazia, Georgia
- Interactive map of Chlou Holy Cross Church ჭლოუს ჯვარი პატიოსანი (in Georgian)
- Coordinates: 42°52′50″N 41°29′45″E

Architecture
- Type: Church
- Completed: 14-15th century

The Chlou Holy Cross Church (Georgian: ჭლოუს ჯვარი პატიოსანი, romanized: ch'lous jvari p'at'iosani) is a ruined medieval church on the right bank of the Duabi river in the village of Chlou in Ochamchire Municipality, Abkhazia, an entity in the South Caucasus with a disputed political status.

== Description of the ruins ==
The church stands 20 km north of the town of Ochamchire on a hill overlooking the Duabi river and is surrounded by a large defensive wall built of large cobblestone. In some places the height of the wall is over 3 meters, the total length of the walls is 500 meters. The western wall of the fence runs through the river. The church walls have survived, but are gravely damaged. It is a hall-church design with a semi-circular apse on the east. The vault has collapsed. The ruins are covered with shrubs of bushes.

== History ==
The church was likely built in the 14th or 15th century, but wall ornamentation may indicate an earlier date of the 11th-12th century. A stone slab found in the ruins displays a Georgian inscription in the asomtavruli script, which is dated roughly to the 14th century when the area was under the sway of the Dadiani family of Mingrelia. It commemorates a high-ranking nobleman (eristavt-eristavi) whose name is reconstructed as Ozbeg Dadiani.
