= Labra (village) =

Labra Georgian: ლაბრა Лабра Լաբրա
- Location within Georgia Location within Abkhazia
- Coordinates: 42°48′30″N 41°23′49″E
- Country: Georgia
- Partially recognized independent country: Abkhazia
- District: Ochamchire
- Time zone: UTC+3 (MSK)
  - Summer (DST): UTC+4

Labra (Georgian: ლაბრა; Abkhaz: Лабра; Armenian: Լաբրա) is a village in Ochamchire District, Abkhazia, Georgia. It is populated predominantly by Hamshen Armenians who founded the village in 1890 after emigration from Ordu in the Ottoman Empire.

In February and March 1993, during the Georgian-Abkhazian war, Labra was looted and destroyed by Georgian forces, who subjected inhabitants to torture, rape and murder. These and similar events in other villages convinced the Armenian population of Gagra District, who had resolved to stay neutral, to join the Abkhazian side of the war, forming the Bagramyan Battalion.

== See also ==
- Ochamchire Municipality
- Ochamchira District
