= Arasadzykh =

Arasadzykh არასაძიხი, Арасаӡыхь
- Village
- Location within Georgia Location within Abkhazia
- Coordinates: 42.88419°N 41.59853°E
- Country: Georgia
- Partially recognized independent country: Abkhazia
- District: Ochamchira

Population (2011)
  - Total: 409
- Time zone: UTC+3 (MSK)
  - Summer (DST): UTC+4

Arasadzykh or Arasadzikhi (Georgian: არასაძიხი; Abkhaz: Арасаӡыхь) is a village in the Ochamchira District of Abkhazia, a partially recognized state claimed by Georgia. The 2011 Abkhazian census recorded a population of 409 people.

== Population ==
Out of this population of 409, according to the 2011 census, 401 were Abkhaz, 1 Georgian, 1 Russian, and 6 others.
