= Zana of Tkhina =

Unusual Abkhazian woman mistaken for a cryptid

Zana (Abkhaz: Зана) was a woman who lived in Abkhazia, then part of the Russian Empire, in the 19th century. Due to her unusual appearance and behavior, she was assumed to be an abnauayu (Note: The abnauayu is an Abkhaz variant of the wild-man folkloric archetype, commonly known as the almas or yeti elsewhere in the region. Other local terms include Mingrelian ochokochi and Georgian tskhiss katsi.) during her lifetime. She was described as being very tall, athletic, dark-skinned, and covered in red hair. After being captured, she was sold into slavery and eventually ended up in the possession of an Abkhaz nobleman, Edgi Genaba, where she resided on his estate for the rest of her life. She never lived indoors nor learned to speak, although she had at least four children under unclear circumstances. She died around the 1880s and was buried in the Genaba family cemetery.

Soviet academics began studying Zana's story in the 1960s, and collected local folklore about her. She became a fixture among cryptozoologists and proponents of relict hominids; she was presented as evidence of the existence of the wild-man, or of a surviving Neanderthal population. Although her son Khwit's body was exhumed in 1971, Zana's skeleton was not conclusively identified until 2021. Genetic analysis of both Zana and her relatives proved that she was a human of sub-Saharan African ancestry, and perhaps had origins with the Afro-Abkhazians. She may have had congenital generalized hypertrichosis, which could have caused her unique appearance and behavior.

== Biography ==
The details of Zana's origin and life are unclear. According to local folklore, she was forcefully captured in the forest (Note: Variously identified as near Mount Zaadan, the Ochamchire coast, or even the coast of Adjara in southwest Georgia.) by hunters and sold into slavery. She was sold multiple times and ended up in the ownership of the Abkhaz nobleman Edgi Genaba, who took her to his estate in Tkhina. She was kept in an enclosure for the first three years, but was gradually allowed more freedom to roam the estate as she became less aggressive. She was described as being abnormally tall and athletic with dark skin and red hair. She often swam in the river, ate fruits from the trees, and slept in a natural pool with the local water buffalo. Although she could not speak, she knew her name and could perform domestic labor. She allegedly showed no signs of aging even after decades of living at the Genaba estate.

Zana had at least four children with local men, under obscure circumstances: Dzhonda (died 1930s), Gamasa (died 1925), Kodzhanar (unknown death date), and Khwit (died 1954). She died around the 1880s and was buried in the family cemetery.

== Academic research ==
Research on Zana began in 1962, when Moscow biologist Alexander Mashkovtsev and Boris Porshnev (who would later become a prominent figure in Soviet cryptozoology) traveled to Tkhina and collected local stories about her. Porshnev collected stories from locals who claimed to have first-hand knowledge of her; he then synthesised the collected stories, and published Zana's story in his 1968 work "The Struggle for Troglodytes", which describes his views on and search for relict hominids.. They were told that Zana and her son Khwit were both buried in the Genaba family cemetery. In 1964, Porshnev attempted to find the graves of Zana and her son Khwit, but was unsuccessful. He subsequently, made a number of other attempts to locate Zana's grave, but remained unsuccessful. In 1971, he had located and exhumed Khwit's remains.

In 1975, a more extensive excavation of the cemetery was undertaken by the Soviet Academy of Science's Institutes of Archaeology and Ethnology. An anomalous burial was discovered: a skeleton was interred on its side in a partially crouched position, without a coffin. A mirror in the grave indicated that the skeleton was female.

Khwit's skull ("Tkhina-71") and that of the unidentified female skeleton ("Tkhina-75") were transferred to Moscow, while the rest of the skeletal remains were moved to the Museum of Natural History in Sukhumi; they were later destroyed in 1992 when the museum was burned down during the Abkhazia War. Tkhina-71 had unusually large zygomatic bones and mandible, and had deep temporal fossa, indicating large temporalis and masseter muscles, and a strong jaw. Tkhina-75 was of an average size for a woman, but had pronounced prognathism. The anthropologists who analyzed the skull found that she probably died in her 40s and was possibly of sub-Saharan African descent based on her features. Because they did not think Khwit had African ancestry, the skull was disregarded as being his mother despite their resemblance.

In 2006, a DNA study done by Todd Disotell at New York University found that the skulls were possibly maternal relatives, but due to contamination the finding could not be conclusive. Vladimir Yamshchikov sequenced samples from the teeth in 2012, and reconstructed full mitochondrial DNA of both individuals, and concluded that they were maternally related. Oxford geneticist Bryan Sykes extracted mitochondrial DNA from Tkhina-71 as well as saliva samples from six of Zana's descendants and found that Khwit's mother was of sub-Saharan African descent, specifically west Africa.

In 2021 a team sequenced the full genomes of both Tkhina-71 and Tkhina-75, and conclusively identified Tkhina-75 as Zana. They found that Zana was of majority eastern African descent, with possible western African admixture. Khwit was of mixed African and Caucasian descent. They hypothesize that Zana could have had congenital generalized hypertrichosis, a disorder which causes excessive hair growth all over the body as well as intellectual disability and dismorphic facial features, which could explain her unusual appearance and behavior.

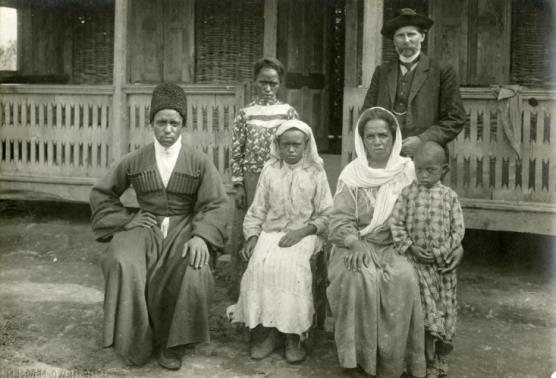
An Afro-Abkhazian family, c. 1912

Zana's African origin has been connected to the Afro-Abkhazians, a small African-descended community historically found in a number of villages in Abkhazia whose origin is disputed. Brian Sykes hypothesized that rather than being Afro-Abkhazian, Zana was descended from an African group which had migrated to the Caucasus over 100,000 years ago. This was strongly criticized by other academics, and later disproved by the genetic work in 2021. Some Russian and British newspapers falsely reported that Sykes claimed Zana could have indeed been a yeti.

=== Cryptozoology ===
During her life, locals believed Zana was an abnauayu. Many Russian cryptozoologists believe Zana was a wild-man or a relict hominid, as proposed by Porshnev, with claims of her having great proportions entirely covered in hair. In 1974 Porshnev and Bernard Heuvelmans published a book titled L'Homme de Néanderthal est toujours vivant ("Neanderthal Man is still Alive"), in which they argued that Zana was a surviving Neanderthal. Cryptozoologists such as Myra Shackley, Dmitri Bayanov, and Igor Burtsev have also promoted the Neanderthal theory.

== In popular culture ==
Abkhaz poet and writer Fazil Iskander briefly described Zana's origin story in his work The Human Campsite, which tells the story of a mentally disabled but large-framed woman who escaped into the mountains and became wild.

== See also ==
- Julia Pastrana
- Afro-Abkhazians
