= Mokvi Gospels =

Mokvi Four Gospels
- მოქვის ოთხთავი
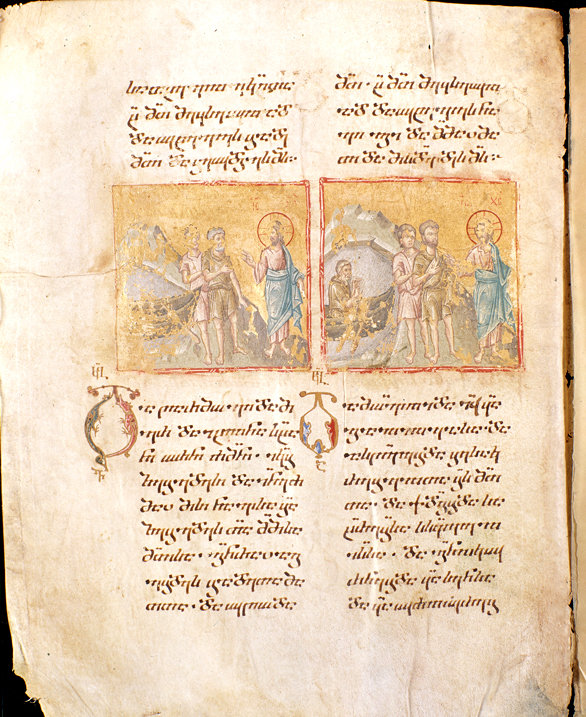
- The Mokvi Gospels

Information
- Religion: Georgian Orthodox Church
- Language: Georgian
- Period: 13th century

The Mokvi Four Gospels (Georgian: მოქვის ოთხთავი) is a 13th-century illuminated manuscript of the Four Gospels in Georgian, copied in the nuskhuri script and richly adorned with miniatures at the Mokvi Cathedral in Abkhazia. The Mokvi Gospels contains 329 pages, each 30 x 23.5 centimetres in size, and a long cycle of 157 miniatures painted on gold leaf. The manuscript is preserved at the Georgian National Centre of Manuscripts in Tbilisi.

Dated to be made in 1300, the manuscript and its miniatures were by monk Ephraim at the Mokvi Monastery after being commanded by Daniel Mokveli, the Archbishop of Mokvi. It was transferred to the Gelati Monastery's library for its preservation in the 1880s, until it had to be transported to France alongside other treasures due to the Soviet invasion of Georgia. The manuscript was returned in then-Soviet Georgia in 1945 at the National Centre of Manuscripts. The manuscript itself had to go under preservation efforts in 2015 due to its condition.

== Description and text ==
The illuminated manuscript contains the text of the Four Gospels written on 329 pages made out of parchment, each page being 30 x 23.5 centimetres in size. The text in the manuscript is written in the Georgian language in nuskhuri script in two columns, possibly using iron gall ink. It is unbound, with some of the quires not being in the right order.

The manuscript was adorned with 157 subject miniatures and four miniatures of the Four Evangelists painted on gold leaf, alongside ten canon tables. In one of the miniatures, Daniel Mokveli, Archbishop of Mokvi, is portrayed in one of the miniatures as praying before the Virgin Mary. Under the gold leaf, a mixture of lead white, yellow ochre, and gypsum or chalk were added. Paint used for the miniatures included lead and bone white for white pigments or paint fillers, vermillion for the red pigment, azurite mixed with either of the white pigments and vermillion for the blue pigment, gold in a pure quality for the yellow pigment in the miniatures, and green earth as the green pigment.

== History ==
The manuscript itself and its miniatures was dated to be made in 1300 at the Mokvi Monastery by monk Ephraim at the command of Mokveli, and donated to the Cathedral of the Holy Virgin at Mokvi. The architectural historian Rudolf Naumann and art historian Hans Belting assume that Ephraim was trained in Constantinople around 1290 and brought the Byzantine style of the miniatures to Georgia. The manuscript was then transported to the Gelati Monastery's library near Kutaisi in the 1880s for its preservation.

In 1921, Georgian historian Ekvtime Takaishvili ordered for the transcript's transport to France alongside other Georgian national treasures because of the Soviet invasion of Georgia. It and other of the treasures returned to the then-Soviet Georgia in 1945 at the Georgian National Centre of Manuscripts in Tbilisi. Due to its deteriorating condition, conservation and repair efforts were made on the manuscript in 2015. It is recorded by the Memory of the World Programme by UNESCO due to the manuscript's high value.

== See also ==
- Bichvinta Gospels
