= Adzyubzha =

Adzyubzha Georgian: აძიუბჟა Abkhaz: Аӡҩыбжьа Russian: Адзю́бжа
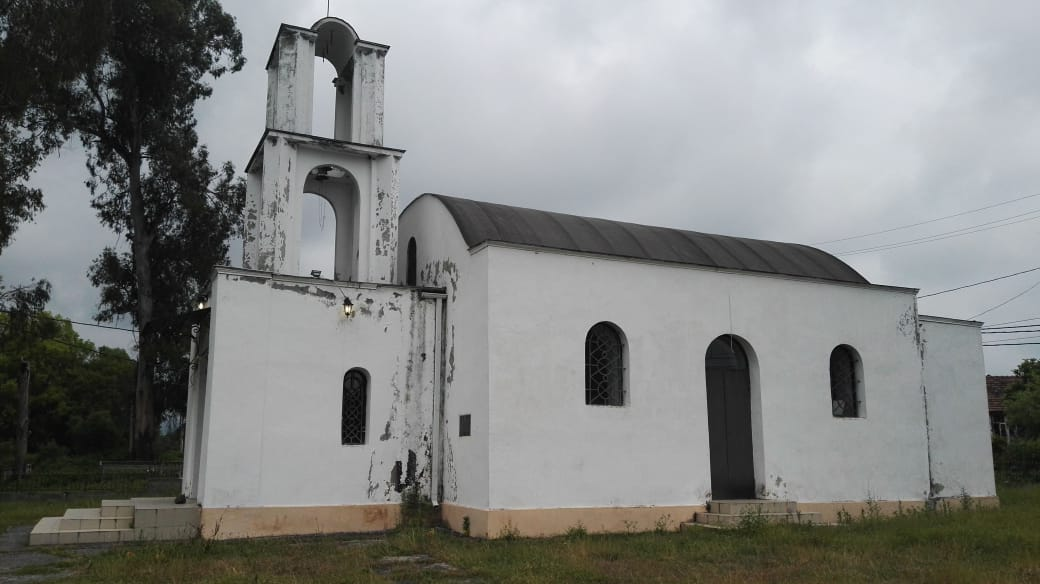
- Adzyubzha church

- Location within Georgia Location within Abkhazia
- Coordinates: 42°50′18″N 41°11′00″E
- Country: Georgia
- Partially recognized independent country: Abkhazia
- District: Ochamchire

Population (2011)
  - Total: 1,072
- Time zone: UTC+3 (MSK)
  - Summer (DST): UTC+4

Adzyubzha (Georgian: აძიუბჟა; Abkhaz: Аӡҩыбжьа; Russian: Адзю́бжа) is a rural settlement in the Ochamchire Municipality of Abkhazia, Georgia’s breakaway republic.

Situated at the mouth of Kodori River, the settlement was known as the most important center of the Afro-Abkhazian population who lived in Adzyubzha and its vicinity.

== History ==
Adzyubzha had a population of 3597 people in 1989 but it was significantly depopulated following the 1993 War. The Georgian population (mostly Mingrelians and Lechkhumians) moved to other regions Georgia, while non-Georgians emigrated to other parts of Abkhazia as well as Russia. At the time of the 2011 Abkhazian Census, Adzyubzha had a population of 1,072. Of these, 84.0% were Abkhaz, 6.0% Russian, 5.8% Georgian, 1.0% Armenian, 0.7% Greek and 0.1% Ukrainian.

== See also ==
- Ochamchire Municipality
- Ochamchira District
- Abkhazians of African descent
