= Mishveli Church "Pichu-Okhvame" =

Church in Georgia

Mishveli Church “Pichu-Okhvame” მიშველის ეკლესია „ფიჭუ ოხვამე“ (in Georgian)
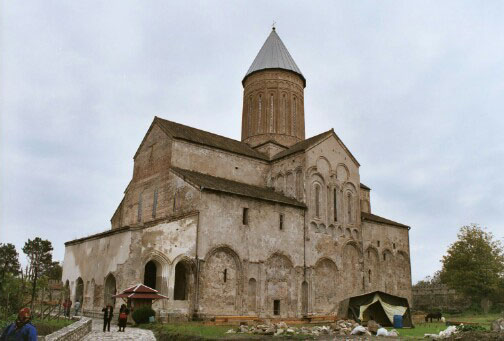

- Location within Abkhazia Location within Georgia

Religion
- Affiliation: Georgian Orthodox
- District: Ochamchire Municipality
- Province: Abkhazia
- Ecclesiastical or organizational status: ruins

Location
- Location: (Georgia (country)) Mishveli, Ochamchire Municipality, Abkhazia, Georgia
- Interactive map of Mishveli Church “Pichu-Okhvame” მიშველის ეკლესია „ფიჭუ ოხვამე“ (in Georgian)
- Coordinates: 42°45′33″N 41°41′00″E

Architecture
- Type: Church
- Completed: Middle Ages

Mishveli Church “Pichu-Okhvame” is a church in the village of Mishveli, Ochamchire municipality, Autonomous Republic of Abkhazia, Georgia.

== History ==
The church was built in the late Middle Ages. The construction represents a hall church, which was built with uncut stones and pebbles. The church is heavily damaged. The church walls are in poor physical condition and need urgent conservation.
