= Bichvinta Gospels =

12th-century illuminated manuscript

Luke the Evangelist, a miniature from the Bichvinta Gospels.

The Bichvinta Four Gospels (Georgian: ბიჭვინთის ოთხთავი) is a 12th-century illuminated manuscript of the Four Gospels in Georgian, copied in the nuskhuri script. It is named after the cathedral church in Abkhazia, where the book was discovered in 1830. The manuscript is now at the Georgian National Center of Manuscripts, Tbilisi, as H-2120.

== Description and history ==
The Bichvinta Gospels manuscript consists of 230 folios, 31 x 23 cm. in size. The text is written in the Georgian nuskhuri script, in two columns. The manuscript is adorned with two miniature paintings of the evangelists Mark and Luke, headpieces, and historiated initials in the "capital" asomtavruli script.

The manuscript is placed in a silver cover, which was commissioned—as an accompanying inscription relates—by the Shervashidze princes, Solomon and his son Arzakan, for the Bichvinta Cathedral of the Theotokos on the occasion of their victory on the side of the king of Imereti and Dadiani against Gurieli and Liparit Dadiani, possibly at the battle of Bandza in June 1658. (Note: The Georgian text reads: ქ. პატიოსანო დიდო ბიჭვინთისა მღთისმშობელო... შეწევნითა თქვენითა, მეფესა და დადიანს წინ გავიმარჯვეთ გურიელსა და ლიპარიტ დადიანზედა და ამისთვინ მოვაჭედინეთ ეს პატიოსანი სახარება. ადამიანთა ძეთა დამყარებულო და სერობინ-ქერობინთა ღაღადობითა ცათა ამაღლებულო, ყოველსა ჟამსა სადიდებელ და საგალობელო და დედაქალაქისა დიდო ბიჭვინტისა მღთისა მშობელო... შეწევნითა თქვენითა ესე პატიოსანი დიდი სახარება მოვაჭედინეთ ჩვენ შარვაშიძემა სოლომონ და ძემან ჩუენმა აზრაყან.)

The manuscript was discovered as laid open on the altar of the then-abandoned Bichvinta Cathedral by the Russian army soldiers upon their conquest of the area in 1830. The manuscript was taken to the Public Library in St. Petersburg and subsequently transferred to the Georgian National Center of Manuscripts in Tbilisi.

== See also ==
- Mokvi Gospels
