= Marmariskari Church =

Church in Marmariskari, Georgia

Marmariskari Church მარმარისკარის ეკლესია (in Georgian)
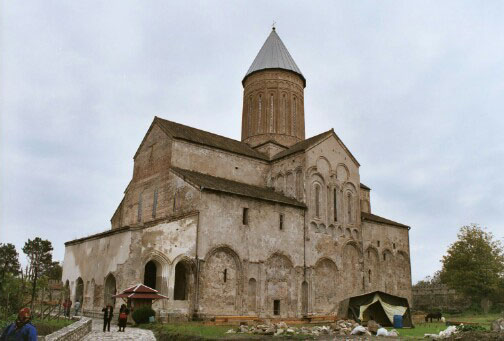

- Location within Abkhazia Location within Georgia

Religion
- Affiliation: Georgian Orthodox
- Province: Abkhazia

Location
- Location: (Georgia (country)) Marmariskari, Ochamchire Municipality, Abkhazia, Georgia
- Interactive map of Marmariskari Church მარმარისკარის ეკლესია (in Georgian)
- Coordinates: 43°00′50″N 41°22′00″E

Architecture
- Type: Church
- Completed: late Middle Ages

Marmariskari Church (Georgian: მარმარისკარის ეკლესია) is a church in the village of Marmariskari, Ochamchire municipality, Autonomous Republic of Abkhazia, Georgia. The church was built in the late Middle Ages. The church walls are in a heavy physical condition and need urgent conservation.
