= Shaaban Abash =

Afro-Abkhazian cavalryman, Soviet soldier and politician

- Шьаабан Амбер-иԥа Абашь
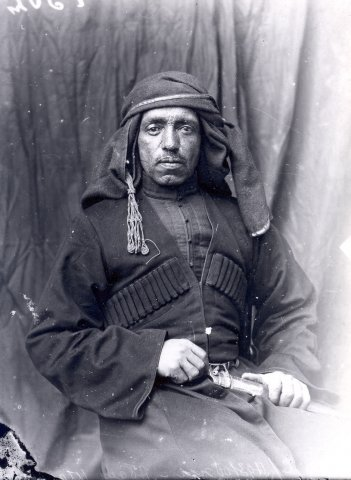
- Shabaan Abash in traditional Abkhaz garb
- Born: Shaaban Amber-ipa Abash; 1890; Adzyubzha, Sukhum Okrug, Russian Empire
- Died: 1953 (aged 62–63); Adzyubzha, Abkhaz ASSR, Soviet Union
- Military career
- Allegiance: Russian Empire; Soviet Russia; Soviet Union
- Branch: Imperial Russian Army; Red Army
- Service years: 1903–1954
- Rank: Gefreiter
- Conflicts: World War I Russian Civil War
- Awards: Cross of St. George, 4th Class

Shaaban Abash (Russian: Шаабан Абаш, Abkhaz: Шьаабан Амбер-иԥа Абашь; 1890 – 1953) was the rider of the 'Abkhaz Hundred' Circassian cavalry regiment of the Caucasian native division in Imperial Russia during the First World War. Shaaban was also Afro-Abkhazian and one of the few ever photographed.

== Early life ==
Shaaban Abash was born in the village of Adzyubzha, in what was then the Sukhum Okrug of the Kutais Governorate in the Russian Empire (now Abkhazia (Note: Abkhazia is the subject of a territorial dispute between the Republic of Abkhazia and Georgia. The Republic of Abkhazia unilaterally declared independence on 23 July 1992, but Georgia continues to claim it as part of its own sovereign territory. Abkhazia has received formal recognition as an independent state from 7 out of 193 United Nations member states, 3 of which have subsequently withdrawn their recognition.)) to an Afro-Abkazian peasant family.

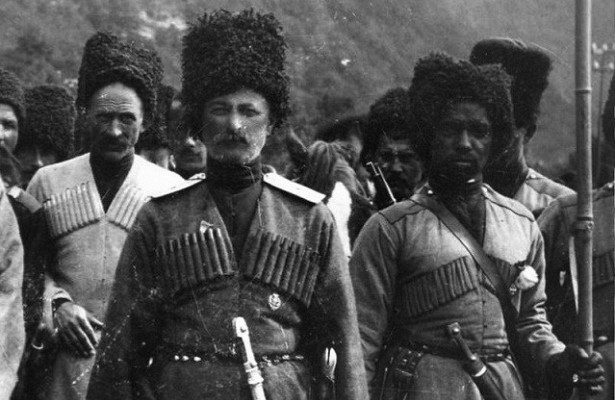
Shaaban Abash with the Circassian cavalry regiment during World War I (c.1914-1918)

=== Military service and career ===
At the age of 17, he enrolled in the 'Abkhaz Hundred' Circassian cavalry regiment, which took part in the First World War. He was awarded the Cross of St. George for making a reconnaissance raid across the river Dniester and returning under fire after collecting valuable intelligence. After the establishment of the Soviet Union, Shaaban Abash was an associate of the leader of Abkhazia Nestor Lakoba, in 1931 he was elected a member of the Central Election Commission of Abkhazia.
