= Chlou =

Chlou Georgian: ჭლოუ Abkhaz: Ҷлоу
- Location within Georgia Location within Abkhazia
- Country: Georgia
- Partially recognized independent country: Abkhazia
- District: Ochamchire

Population (2011)
  - Total: 1,609
- Time zone: UTC+3 (MSK)
  - Summer (DST): UTC+4

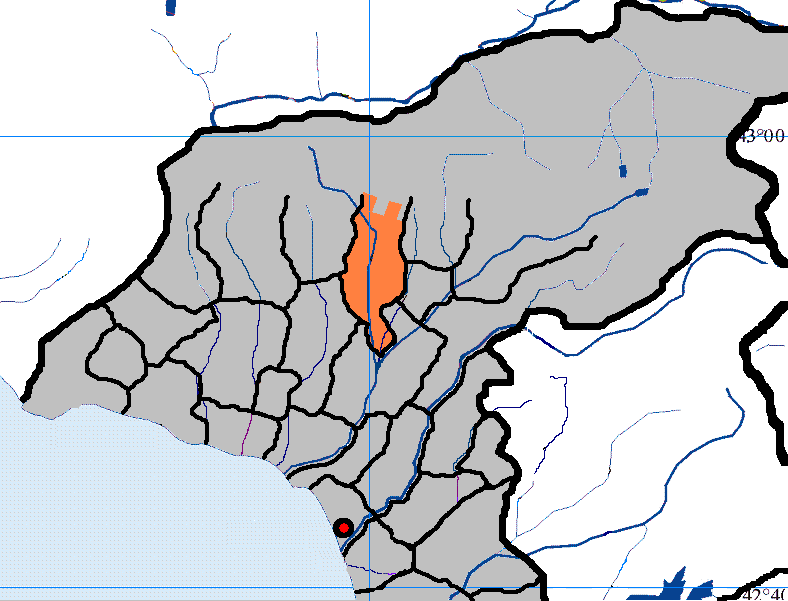
Chlou village, Ochamchira district

Chlou (Georgian: ჭლოუ; Abkhaz: Ҷлоу) is a village in Ochamchire Municipality, Abkhazia, Georgia.

== Demographics ==
At the time of the 2011 census, Chlou had a population of 1,609. Of these, 95.4% were Abkhaz, 3.3% Georgian, 0.7% Russian, 0.1% Ukrainian and 0.1% Armenian.

Boris Adleiba[ru], the first secretary of the Abkhazian regional committee of the Communist Party who was first to sign the 1989 Lykhny Declaration was from Chlou. The letter was a major cause of the 1989 Sukhumi Riots. Beslan Butba, the owner of Abaza TV is also from Chlou.

== See also ==
- Ochamchira District
- Ochamchire Municipality
