= Beslakhuba =

Beslakhuba Georgian: ბესლახუბა Abkhaz: Баслахә
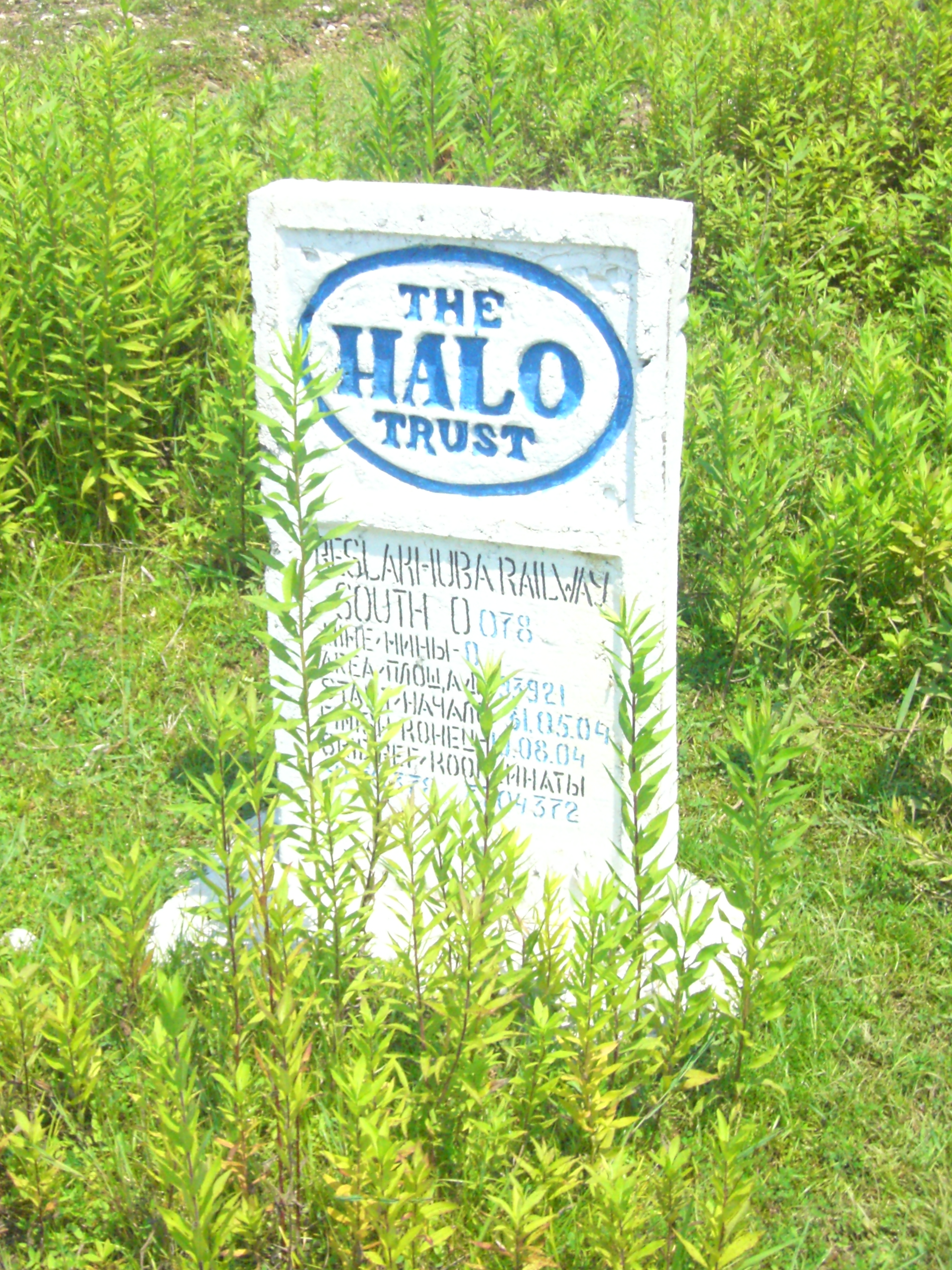
- Halo trust sign on Beslakhuba railway.

- Location within Georgia Location within Abkhazia
- Coordinates: 42°45′27″N 41°30′52″E
- Country: Georgia
- Partially recognized independent country: Abkhazia
- District: Ochamchire

Population (1989)
  - Total: 1,864
- Time zone: UTC+3 (MSK)
  - Summer (DST): UTC+4
- Website: http://www.baslakhu.org/

Beslakhuba or Baslakhuba (Georgian: ბესლახუბა; Abkhaz: Баслахә) is a village in Ochamchire District, Abkhazia, Georgia. Transportation: Beslakhuba Railway Station, Ochamchire-Tkvarcheli.
