= Kvitouli Church of Kiachi =

Ruined medieval church in the Kvitouli, Ochamchire Municipality, Abkhazia, Georgia

Kvitouli Church of Kiachi ქიაჩის ეკლესია (in Georgian) Қьач ауахәама (in Abkhaz)
- Location within Abkhazia Location within Georgia

Religion
- Affiliation: Georgian Orthodox
- Province: Abkhazia
- Ecclesiastical or organizational status: ruins

Location
- Location: (Georgia (country)) Kvitouli Ochamchire Municipality, Abkhazia, Georgia
- Interactive map of Kvitouli Church of Kiachi ქიაჩის ეკლესია (in Georgian); Қьач ауахәама (in Abkhaz)
- Coordinates: 42°49′59″N 41°22′30″E

Architecture
- Type: Church
- Completed: 11th century

The Kvitouli Church of Kiachi (Georgian: ქიაჩის ეკლესია; Abkhaz: Қьач ауахәама) is a ruined medieval church in the Kvitouli, Ochamchire Municipality, Abkhazia, a breakaway region of Georgia. The ruins lie on the Kiachi hill, near the modern-day village of Jgerda, 8 km south of the Kodori river, in the Tsebelda valley. The name Kvitouli refers to a historical community to which the church belonged and of which the modern-day village of Kutol/Kutoli is part.

== Layout ==
The ruined church is a three-nave basilica, built of porous stone, 17.5 m in length and 16.5 m in width. Better preserved are the altar portion and the southern wall of the central nave. The church has a rectangular plan, aisles being asymmetrical. The northern nave is divided into three parts. The only entrance is on the west. No openings in the side walls have survived. The vault of the central nave rests on three pairs of pilasters in the longitudinal walls. Based on the shape of these elements, the church can tentatively be dated to the 11th century.

== History ==
The first recorded mention of the Kiachi church is found in a Georgian inscription of a ripidion (liturgical fan) which is dated by the art historian Giorgi Chubinashvili, based on its style and iconography, to the 10th century. If the dating is correct, the king George mentioned in the inscription could have been George II of Abkhazia (r. 923–957). The Kiachi church is next heard of — as "Chiaggi" — in the writings of Arcangelo Lamberti who led a Catholic proselyting mission in western Georgian principalities from 1633 to 1649.

In 1640, Levan II Dadiani, prince-regnant of Mingrelia—who held sway of parts of Abkhazia at that time—donated to the Kiachi church an icon of the Archangel, adorned with precious stones and a Georgian inscription, which makes note of the occasion. An abbot at Kiachi was instructed to bring the icon to the nearby princely palace at Kvitauri twice a year. As the Dadiani control of Abkhazia eroded and Christian culture went in decline later in that century, the precious objects of Kiachi were evacuated to relative security in Mingrelia, the icon of the Archangel in Choga and the ripidion (which was also venerated as an icon) in Obuji. By 1681, a new church had been built in Obuji to house the ripidion and also became known as Kiachi. Nowadays, both the Kiachi icon of the Archangel and the ripidion are on display at the Dadiani Palace Museum in Zugdidi, formerly the main town of the Principality of Mingrelia.

== See also ==
- Kvitouli Castle
