= Kvitouli Castle =

- კვიტოულის ციხესიმაგრე (Georgian)
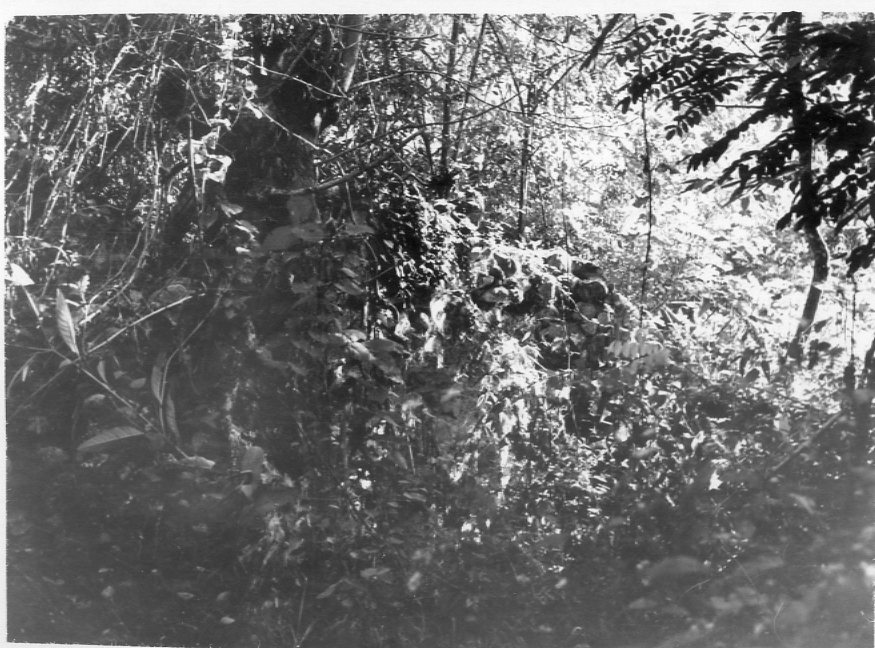

- Location within Abkhazia Location within Georgia
- 42°49′48″N 41°21′57″E
- Location: (Georgia (country)) Kvitouli Ochamchire Municipality, Abkhazia, Georgia

History
- Built: Middle Ages

Site notes
- Area: Ochamchire Municipality

Kvitouli Castle (Georgian: კვიტოულის ციხესიმაგრე) is a castle in the village of Kvitouli, Ochamchire municipality, Autonomous Republic of Abkhazia, Georgia.

== History ==
The castle was built in the Middle Ages. The construction is situated on an estate. The castle is heavily damaged. The height of the preserved stone walls is 2–3 meters. The castle walls are in a poor physical condition and need an urgent conservation.

It was granted the status of Monument of Cultural Heritage by the National Agency for Cultural Heritage Preservation of Georgia in 2018.

== See also ==
- Kvitouli Church of Kiachi
