= Ghvada =

Ghvada ღვადა (in Georgian) Ҕәада (in Abkhaz)
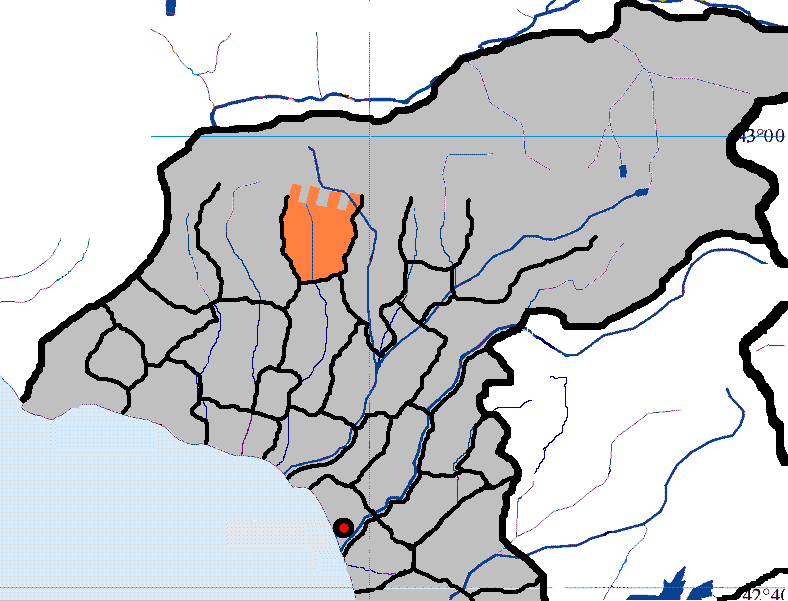
- Guada, Ochamchira region, Abkhazia

- Location of Ghvada in Georgia Ghvada (Abkhazia)
- Coordinates: 42°54′10″N 41°26′00″E
- Country: Georgia
- Occupied by: Abkhazia
- District: Ochamchire

Population (1989)
  - Total: 677
- Time zone: UTC+3 (MSK)
  - Summer (DST): UTC+4

Ghvada (Georgian: ღვადა; Abkhaz: Ҕәада) is a village in the Ochamchire District of Abkhazia, Georgia.

== Notable residents ==
- Nugzar Ashuba – Abkhaz politician, Speaker of the People's Assembly of Abkhazia (2002–2012)

== Bibliography ==
- Georgian Soviet Encyclopedia Vol. 10, p. 586, 1986.
