= Mokvi =

Mokvi Georgian: მოქვი, Abkhaz: Мықә
- Village
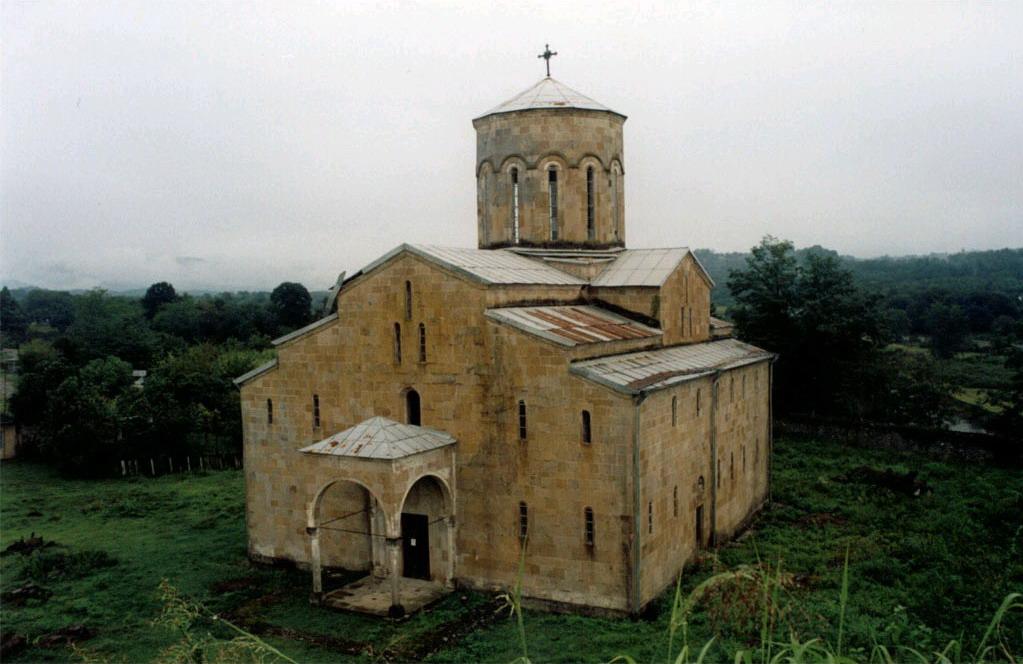
- Mokvi Cathedral

- Location in Georgia Mokvi (Abkhazia)
- Coordinates: 42°50′16″N 41°29′28″E
- Country: Georgia
- Partially recognized independent country: Abkhazia
- District: Ochamchire
- Elevation: 130 m (430 ft)

Population (2011)
  - Total: 939
- Time zone: UTC+3/+4 (MSK/GET)

Mokvi (Georgian: მოქვი; Abkhaz: Мықә) is a village in the partially recognized state of Abkhazia, a breakaway region of Georgia. Located on the Mokvi river, its elevation above sea level is around 130m. The distance to Ochamchire is 17 km. As of 2011 the population was 939. Mokvi is home to the Mokvi Cathedral, built in the 10th century by Abkhazian king Leon III.

== See also ==
- Ochamchire Municipality
- Ochamchira District
