= Kochara =

Kochara Georgian: კოჩარა Abkhaz: Кәачира
- Location within Georgia Location within Abkhazia
- Coordinates: 42°51′35″N 41°26′52″E
- Country: Georgia
- Partially recognized independent country: Abkhazia
- District: Ochamchire

Population (2011)
  - Total: 277
- Time zone: UTC+3 (MSK)
  - Summer (DST): UTC+4

Kochara (Georgian: კოჩარა; Abkhaz: Кәачира) is a village in Ochamchire District, Abkhazia, Georgia. The 2011 census recorded a population of 277.
