= Abkhazians =

Northwest Caucasian ethnic group native to Abkhazia

Abkhaz
Аԥсуаа (Abkhaz)
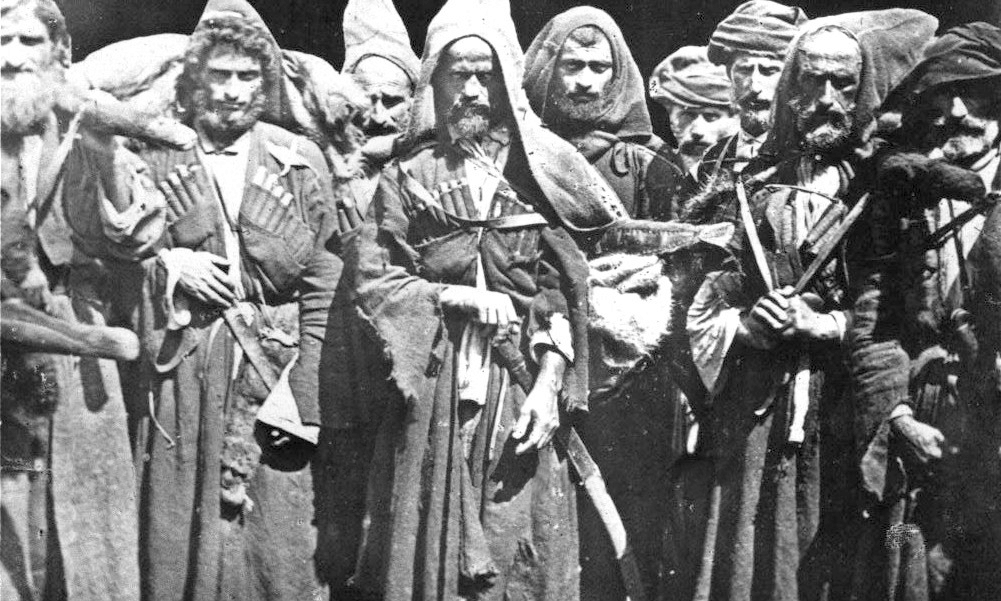

Regions with significant populations
- Abkhazia (Note: The political status of Abkhazia is disputed. Having unilaterally declared independence from Georgia in 1992, Abkhazia is formally recognised as an independent state by 4 UN member states (three other states previously recognised it but then withdrew their recognition), while the remainder of the international community recognizes it as de jure Georgian territory. Georgia continues to claim the area as its own territory, designating it as Russian-occupied territory.): 125,434 (2021 census)
- Turkey: 30,000–500,000
- Egypt: 15,000
- Syria: c. 10,000
- Russia: 8,177 (2021 census)
- Germany: 5,100
- Jordan: c. 4,000
- Ukraine: 1,458 (2001)
- Greece: c. 1,400+ (2017)
- Georgia: 864 (2014)
- Netherlands: 800
- Latvia: 22–29 (2021)

Languages
- Abkhaz (native), Russian, Georgian, Turkish

Religion
- Sunni Islam (majority in Turkey and other Middle Eastern countries); Abkhazian Orthodox Christianity (majority in Abkhazia); Abkhaz native faith (minority in Abkhazia)

Related ethnic groups
- Abazins, Circassians, Ubykhs

The Abkhaz people, (Note: Abkhaz: Аԥсуаа, romanized: Apsuaa, IPA: [ˈɑpʰswɑː]) sometimes referred to as the Abkhazians, are a Northwest Caucasian ethnic group mainly living in Abkhazia — a region on the northeastern coast of the Black Sea which is internationally recognized as part of Georgia but is de facto outside of its control. A large Abkhaz diaspora population also resides in Turkey, Egypt, Syria and Russia.

== History ==
Some scholars say the ancient Heniochi tribe were the progenitors of the Abkhaz. This warlike people came into contact with Ancient Greeks through the Greek colonies of Dioskourias and Pitiuntas. In the Roman period, the Abasgoi/Abasgi are mentioned as inhabiting the region. These Abasgoi (Abkhaz) were described by Procopius as warlike, worshippers of three deities.

Bagrat III of Georgia, 11th century king of the Kingdom of Abkhazia

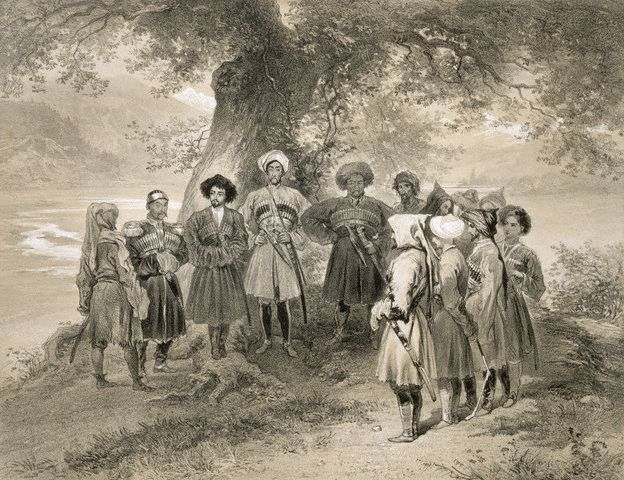
Conference of Abkhazian nobility in 1839

The Abasgi, living in modern Abkhazia, were part of the Lazian Empire (also known as Egrisi, a state in the territory of western Georgia). Their monarch was appointed by the Laz king, contingent upon the approval of the Byzantine emperor. After the decline of the Kingdom of Egrisi, Abasgian prince Leon I acquired Egrisi with the Byzantine support in the 7th century. After expanding to the western Georgia, Abasgia was transformed into the kingdom with a capital in Kutaisi. The kingdom soon adopted the Georgian language instead of Greek. In 978, Abkhazia united with the eastern Georgian kingdom through dynastic succession, which resulted in the formation of the Kingdom of Georgia.

The region came under the sway of the Ottoman Empire in the 16th century and the population was gradually Islamized in the 16-17th centuries.

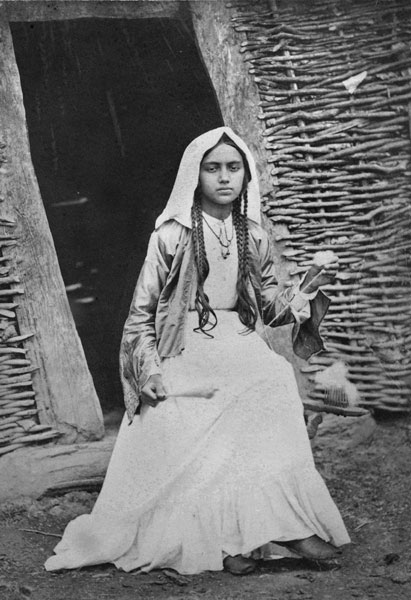
Abkhaz girl in 1881

The Russian conquest of Abkhazia from the 1810s to the 1860s was accompanied by a massive expulsion of Muslim Abkhaz to the Ottoman Empire (the Christian Abkhaz were largely spared from the deportations) and the introduction of a strong Russification policy. As a result, the Abkhaz diaspora is currently estimated to measure at least twice the number of Abkhaz that reside in Abkhazia. The largest part of the diaspora now lives in Turkey, with estimates ranging from 100,000 to 500,000, with smaller groups in Syria (5,000 – 10,000) and Jordan. In recent years, some of these have emigrated to the West, principally to Germany (5,000), Netherlands, Switzerland, Belgium, France, United Kingdom, Austria and the United States (mainly to New Jersey). The teaching of the Russian language to the Abkhaz replaced Georgian with Russian as the second language for the Abkhaz, leading to the alienation of Abkhazians from Georgians despite their common historical heritage with the Georgians. The policy of Russification in Georgia included fostering minority languages, such as Abkhaz, through the creation of alphabets (Note: The first Abkhaz alphabet was created in 1862 by Russian general Peter von Uslar based on the Cyrillic script.) and the preparation of elementary textbooks in these languages to obviate the use of Georgian as the language of culture and the vehicle of everyday literacy.

Some Abkhazians fought for Greece and/or worked for the Greek authorities during the Greco-Turkish War (see: North Caucasian cooperation with Greece during the Greco-Turkish War (1919–1922) for more). After its end, thousands of Abkhazians, especially from Adapazarı, Düzce, Hendek and Bolu, fled to Greece in order to avoid ethnic persecution by the Turks. Many of them later migrated to Abkhazia in the Soviet Union. By 1929, it was reported that 700 of these Abkhazians had stayed in Greece, particularly in Greek Macedonia, adapting to local customs and conditions. According to Abkhaz ethnographer and historian Shalva Inal-ipa in 2017, this number should have at least doubled since then, but there is no exact estimate.

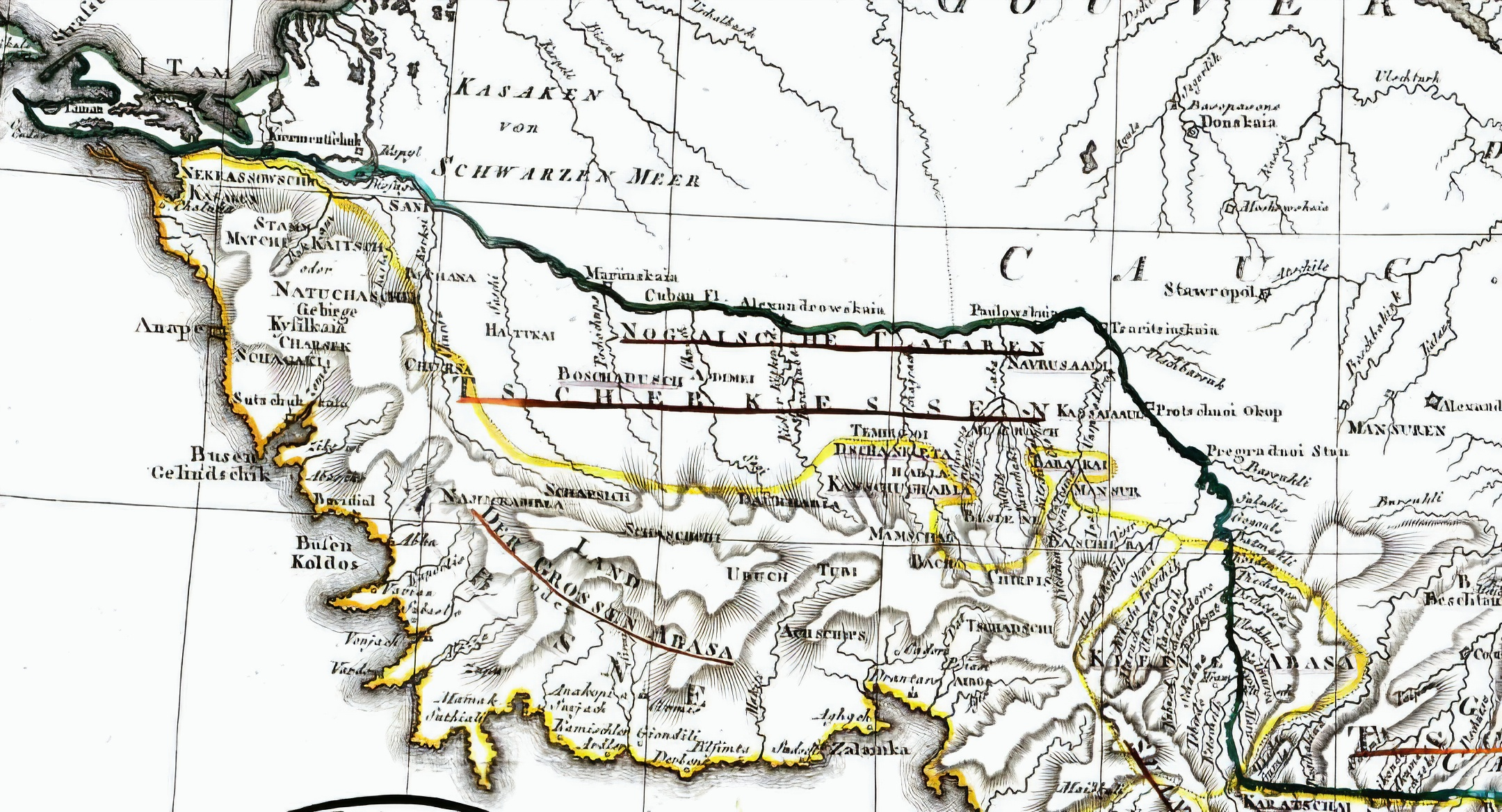
The lands of the Abkhaz/Abaza and their neighbours in the beginning of the 19th century

The 1992–1993 War in Abkhazia followed by the ethnic cleansing of Georgians in Abkhazia left the Abkhaz an ethnic plurality of ca. 45%, with Russians, Armenians, Georgians, Greeks, and Jews comprising most of the remainder of the population of Abkhazia. The 2003 census established the total number of Abkhaz in Abkhazia at 94,606. However, the exact demographic figures for the region are disputed and alternative figures are available. The de facto Abkhaz president Sergey Bagapsh suggested, in 2005, that less than 70,000 ethnic Abkhaz lived in Abkhazia.

At the time of the 2011 Census, 122,175 Abkhaz were living in Abkhazia. They were 50.8% of the total population of the republic.

In the course of the Syrian uprising, a number of Abkhaz living in Syria immigrated to Abkhazia. By mid-April 2013, approximately 200 Syrians of Abkhaz descent had arrived in Abkhazia. A further 150 were due to arrive by the end of April. The Abkhazian leadership has stated that it would continue the repatriation of Abkhaz living abroad. As of August 2013, 531 Abkhaz had arrived from Syria according to the Abkhazian government.

== Ethnology ==
The Abkhaz language belongs to the small Northwest Caucasian language family, also known as Abkhaz–Adyghe or Pontic family, which groups the dialectic continuum spoken by the Abaza–Abkhaz (Abazgi) and Adyghe ("Circassians" in English). Abkhazians are closely ethnically related to Circassians and Abazins.

=== Subgroups ===
There are also three subgroups of the Abkhaz people. The Bzyb (Бзыԥ, Bzyph) reside in the Bzyb River region, and speak their own dialect. The Abzhui (Абжьыуа, Abzhwa) live in the Kodori River region, and also speak their own dialect, which the Abkhaz literary language is based upon. Finally, there are the Samurzakan who reside in the southeast of Abkhazia.

== Economy ==
The typical economy is strong on the breeding of cattle, beekeeping, viticulture, and agriculture.

== Religion ==
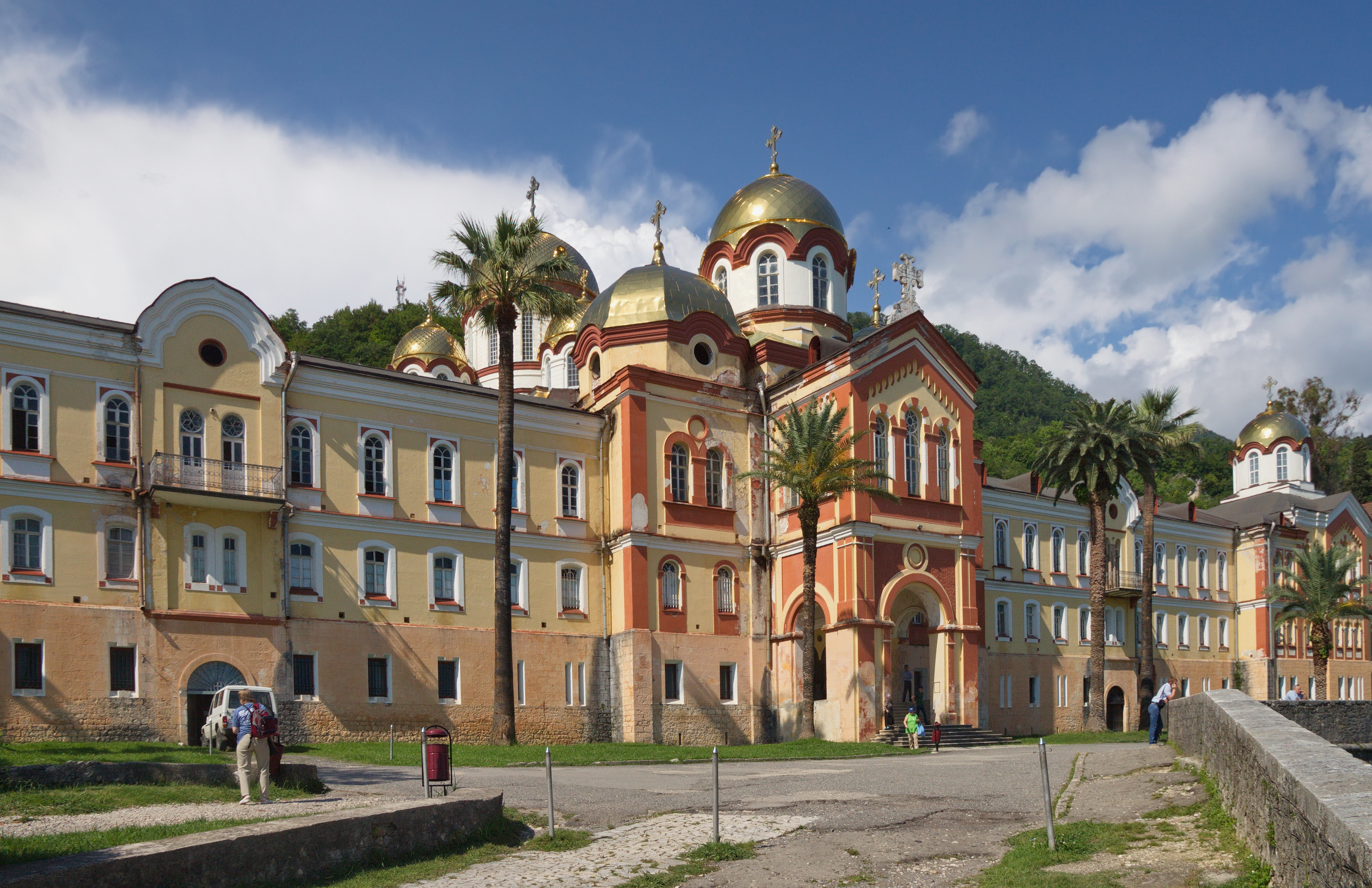
New Athos Monastery

The Abkhaz people are principally divided into Abkhazian Orthodox Christian (the Abkhazian Orthodox Church is not recognized by any of the world Orthodox churches, but the territory is recognized as the Eparchy of Bichvinta and Tskhum-Abkhazia of the Georgian Orthodox Church) and Sunni Muslim (Hanafi) communities, (prevalent in Abkhazia and Turkey respectively) but the indigenous non-Abrahamic beliefs have always been strong. Although Christianity made its first appearance in the realm of their Circassian neighbours in the first century AD via the travels and preaching of the Saint Andrew, and became the dominant religion of Circassians in the 3rd to 4th centuries, Christianity became the dominant religion of Abkhazians in the 6th century during the reign of Byzantine emperor Justinian I, and continued to be followed under the kings of Georgia in the High Middle Ages. The Ottomans introduced Islam in the 16th century and the region became largely Muslim gradually until the 1860s.

== Diaspora ==
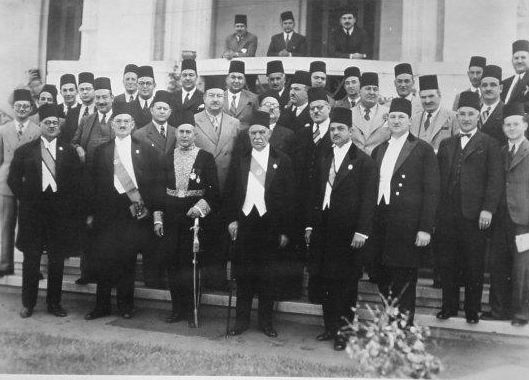
Elders of Egypt's largest Circassian clan, the Abkhaz-descended Abazas, in 1923.

Many Muslim Circassians, Abkhaz and Chechens migrated to the Ottoman Empire following revolts against Russian rule. It is believed that the Abkhaz community in Turkey is larger than that of Abkhazia itself. Some 250 Abkhaz-Abaza villages are estimated throughout Turkey. According to Andrew Dalby, Abkhazian-speakers might number more than 100,000 in Turkey, however, the 1963 census only recorded 4,700 native speakers and 8,000 secondary speakers. Most Abkhaz speakers in Turkey have assimilated into Turkish society. In Egypt, the largest Circassian clan in the country, the Abaza family, originated from Abkhazia and is "deeply rooted in Egyptian society... [and] in the history of the country". It also contributed to Egyptian and Arabic cultural literary, intellectual, and political life starting with the reign of Muhammad Ali Pasha in Egypt and continuing to the modern day.

== Genetics ==
The people closest genetically to the Abkhazians are the Abazins and Circassians. There are also similarities between some Western Georgian ethnic groups.

== Gallery ==
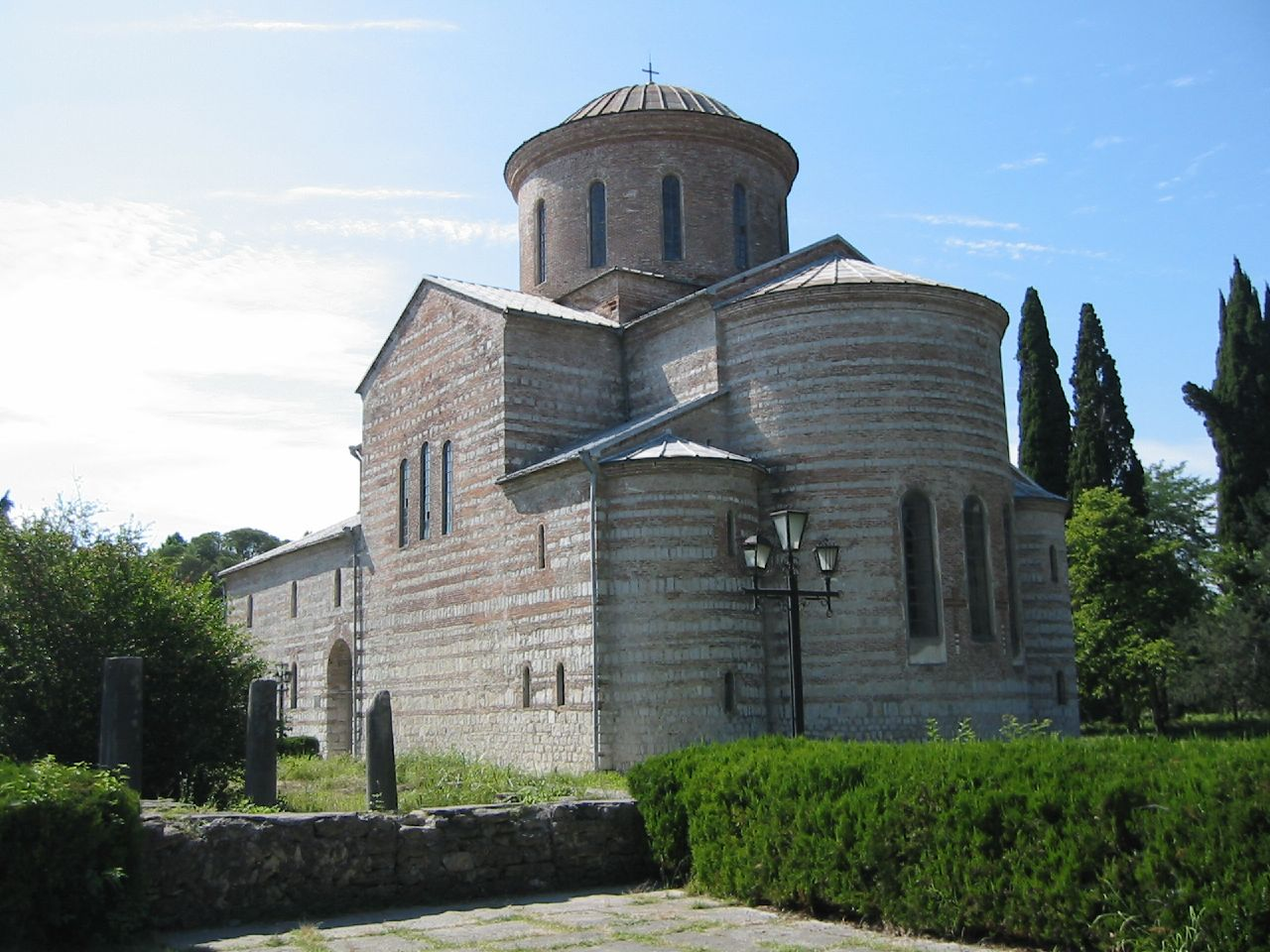
Pitsunda Cathedral, seat of Abkhazian Orthodox Church

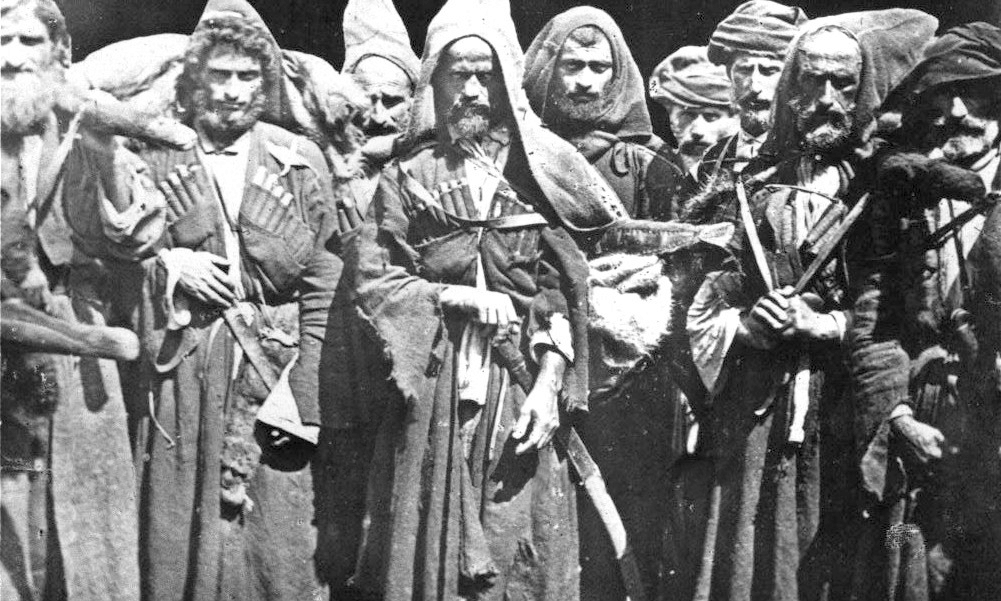
Abkhazs in the mid-19th century

== Notable people ==
=== Literature ===
- Alexey Gogua (1932-2025), writer
- Dmitry Gulia (1874–1960), Abkhazian Soviet writer and poet
- Fazil Iskander (1929–2016), writer
- Bagrat Shinkuba (1917–2004), writer, poet
- Aziz Pasha Abaza (1898 – 1973) poet
- Fekry Pasha Abaza (1895 – 1979) a journalist, writer and democratic political activist
- Tharwat Abaza (1927 – 2002) novelist and journalist

=== Politics ===
- Aslan Bzhania (born 1963), Abkhaz politician
- Alexander Ankvab (born 1952), Abkhaz politician
- Anzor Kudba (born 1939), member of Supreme Council of the Republic of Georgia from 1990 to 1992
- Aslan Smirba (born 1959), mayor of Batumi from 1997 to 1999 and member of the Parliament of Georgia from 1999 to 2004
- Gennadi Gagulia (1948–2018), Abkhazian politician
- Hayreddin Pasha (1820–1890), Ottoman politician
- Mirab Kishmaria (born 1961), Abkhaz politician and army general
- Nestor Lakoba (1893–1936), Abkhaz communist leader
- Rauf Orbay (1881–1964), Turkish politician
- Raul Khajimba (born 1958), Abkhazian politician
- Rauf Orbay (1881–1964), Turkish naval officer and diplomat
- Shaaban Abash (1890–1943), rider in the Circassian cavalry regiment of the Caucasian native division during WWI
- Sergei Bagapsh (1949–2011), President of Abkhazia
- Vladimir Arshba (1959–2018), Abkhaz soldier and politician
- Vladislav Ardzinba (1945–2010), first de facto president of Abkhazia
- Abaza family a diaspora family that produced a large number of politicians

=== Other ===
- Mikhail, Prince of Abkhazia (1806–1866)
- Hala Gorani, American journalist
- Rushdy Abaza Arabic-language actor

== See also ==
- Afro-Abkhazians
- Women in Abkhazia
- History of Abkhazia
- Abkhaz language
