= Women in Abkhazia =

Abkhazian women, particularly those of older age, are traditionally portrayed as peacemakers, decision makers, and mediators in times of combat and conflict. The women in Abkhazia only have a marginal in number within the showground of Abkhazian politics. At present, Abkhazian women are more active as participants in the realm of business and in activities related to establishing organizations for women in their country.

== Gallery ==
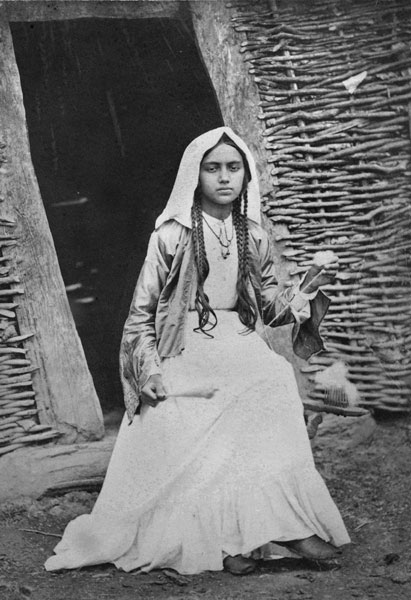
An Abkhazian girl, 1881.

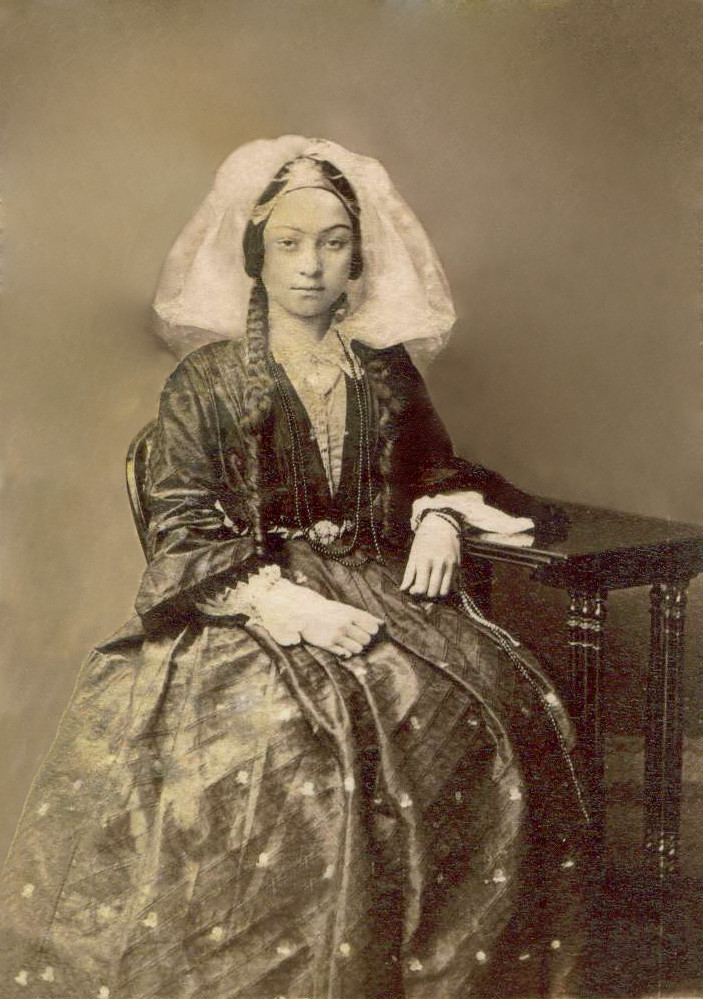
A young Abkhazian woman, before 1899.

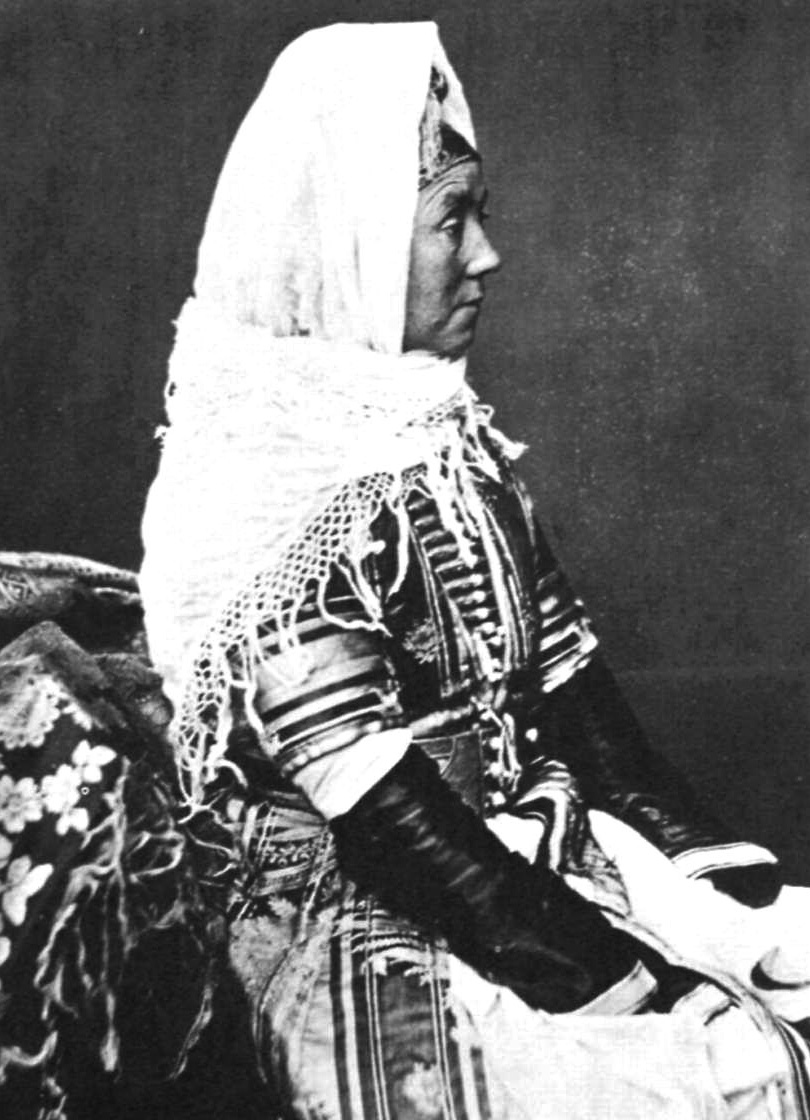
An older Abkhazian woman, c. 1890s.

== See also ==
- Saida Gunba
