= Ilori Church =

Church building in Ilori, Georgia

Ilori Church of St. George ილორის წმ. გიორგის ეკლესია
- Ilori Church of St. George as illustrated by Cristoforo Castelli.

- Location within Georgia Location within Abkhazia

Religion
- Affiliation: Georgian Orthodox Church
- District: Ochamchire Municipality
- Region: Caucasus
- Status: Active

Location
- Location: Ilori, Ochamchire Municipality, Georgia (Abkhazia)
- Coordinates: 42.696111°N 41.499722°E

Architecture
- Type: Domed, single-nave
- Style: Georgian; Church
- Completed: Early 11th century
- Dome: 1
- Designated as NHL

Immovable Cultural Monument of National Significance of Georgia
- Official name: St. George Church
- Designated: November 7, 2006; 19 years ago
- Reference no.: 3544
- Item Number in Cultural Heritage Portal: 9402
- Date of entry in the registry: October 3, 2007; 18 years ago

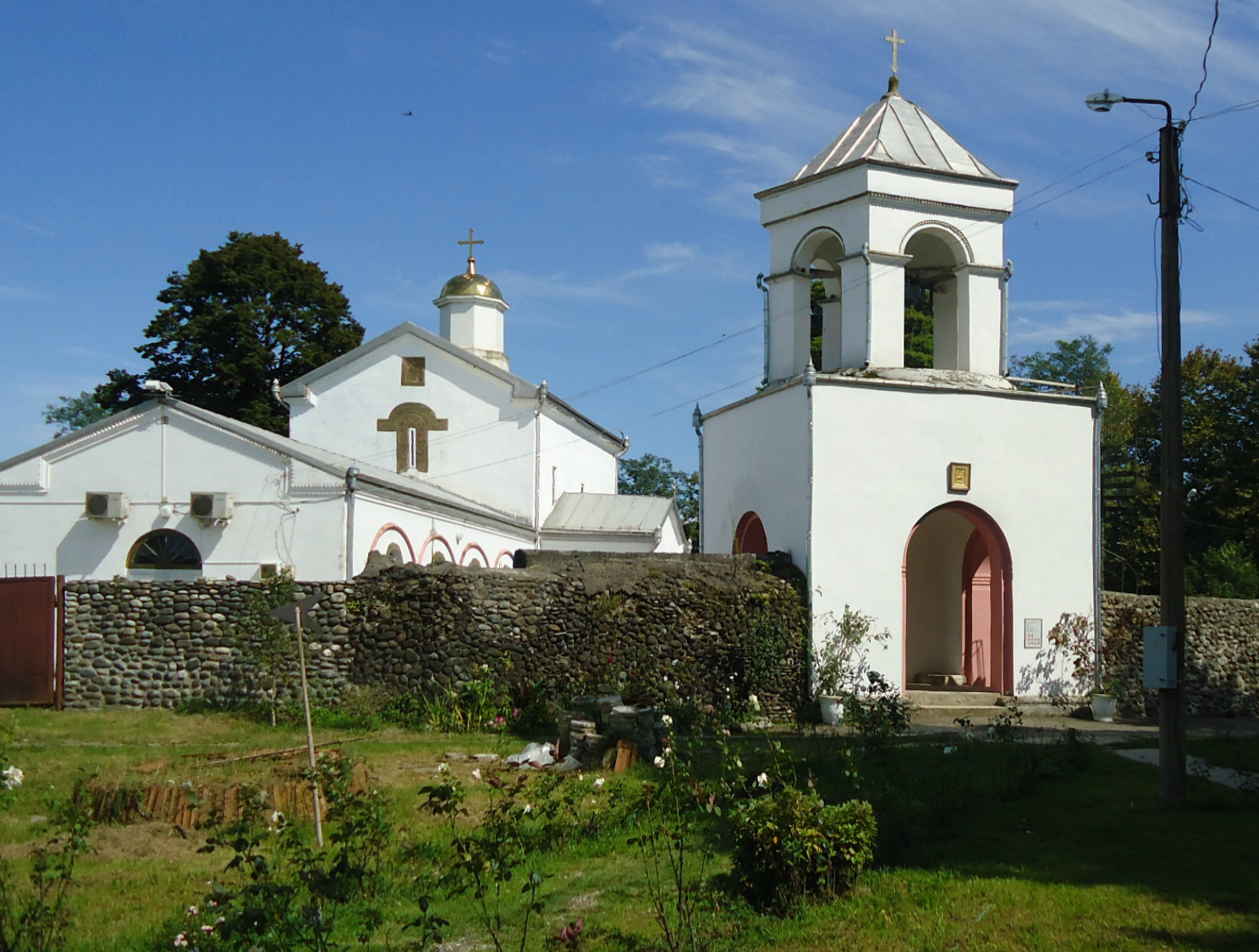
Ilori Church now

The Church of St. George of Ilori (Georgian: ილორის წმ. გიორგის ეკლესია) is a Medieval, originally Georgian Orthodox Church in the village of Ilori, in the Ochamchire Municipality of Abkhazia, (Note: The political status of Abkhazia is disputed. Having unilaterally declared independence from Georgia in 1992, Abkhazia is formally recognised as an independent state by 4 UN member states (three other states previously recognised it but then withdrew their recognition), while the remainder of the international community recognizes it as de jure Georgian territory. Georgia continues to claim the area as its own territory, designating it as Russian-occupied territory.) Georgia. The Church was built in the first quarter of the 11th century, and represents one of the most important sites of western Georgian architecture. It is also considered one of the more significant religious locations of Medieval western Georgia. The building has a single-nave design.

During its long history, the church underwent several important architectural modifications and was repaired by Levan II Dadiani in the 17th century, only to be burnt down by Ottoman Turks in 1736. The building was eventually restored again by the Princes of Odishi in the latter half of the same century.

On 9 February 2011, the Abkhazian government transferred the church into the perpetual care of the Abkhazian Orthodox Church.

== Cattle Sacrifice to Saint George ==
From ancient times the church participated in an annual festival to Saint George on October 21. The festival commemorated a miracle supposedly performed by the saint in which a pagan was converted to Christianity when his ox mysteriously appeared in the saint's church hundreds of leagues away. From that time, the miracle was commemorated every year by a special festival. According to French traveler Jean Chardin, who visited and wrote of the area in 1672, each year a young man aspiring to become a priest would steal an ox and smuggle it into the church in the middle of the night. The night before the festival, the local bishop made a show of checking the church for cattle, and placing a bucket before the door to illustrate that the church had not been entered in the night. When the church was opened the next morning an ox had ″mysteriously″ appeared. The ox was then sacrificed to the Saint George. Parts of the cow were given to the kings of Imereti and Guria, part to the priesthood, and part to the common people of the area, who considered the meat to be sacred.

The state of the ox was said to predict the fortune of the coming year. If the ox struggled before being sacrificed, it meant there would be war. If the cow defecated it was a symbol of fertility. If the cow was wet there would be plenty of wine. If the cow was red in color it meant high mortality among men and horses, but any other color of ox was a symbol of good luck.

This practice purportedly continued into the 20th century.

== 2010 restoration controversy ==
In 2010, the church underwent restoration. According to the Georgian government, this resulted in severe damage to the church's historic character. It accused the Abkhazian government of plastering parts of the exterior and the interior of the church that featured Georgian inscriptions and frescos, and of replacing the Georgian-style dome with a Russian-style one. The Georgian government called on international conservation organizations and in particular UNESCO to intervene.

Demur Bzhania, head of the Abkhazian Directorate for the Protection of Cultural Heritage, declared that the church's Priest had not coordinated the reconstruction with his office, and admitted that the placement of the dome would have to be corrected. However, he defended the whitewashing of the walls, claiming that the interior had not been touched and that old photographs of the church's exterior did not show any Georgian inscriptions or murals. According to head of the Abkhazian Orthodox Church Vissarion Aplaa, the church did not originally have a dome, and its historic character had first been affected when Georgian authorities placed a Georgian-style dome on top of it during the 1940s and 1950s. This dome had then collapsed during the 1992-1993 war Georgian-Abkhazian war, and now the local Priest had replaced it with a new dome to prevent water from entering the church.

The issue was also raised by the Georgian delegation at the 25th meeting for incident prevention in Chuburkhinji on 22 February 2011, demanding a joint visit to the church. Viacheslav Chirikba, special envoy of the Abkhazian President, stated in the run-up to the meeting that Georgia had no authority to raise the issue, and that EUMM Georgia head Hansjörg Haber and UN special representative Antti Turunen had had the opportunity during informal visits to convince themselves that the historic character of the church had not been compromised. The church was also visited by EU special representative Pierre Morel on 18 February.

== Current condition ==
The territory is currently occupied by Russia, thus it is impossible to study and to conduct the appropriate works.

But we have information that, in 2010, the Abkhazian separatists and Russian occupants installed a Russian dome on the 11th century Georgian church in order to erase totally any Georgian sign off the external facades; internal ones were partially repainted in white, the eastern part, where the Georgian inscriptions had been carved, is totally plastered. Contemporary air-conditioners have been installed in the church.

Ilori Church has been given the status of national importance monument.

== Sources ==
- Cultural Heritage in Abkhazia, Tbilisi, 2015
