= Ilori =

Ilori Georgian: ილორი Abkhaz: Елыр
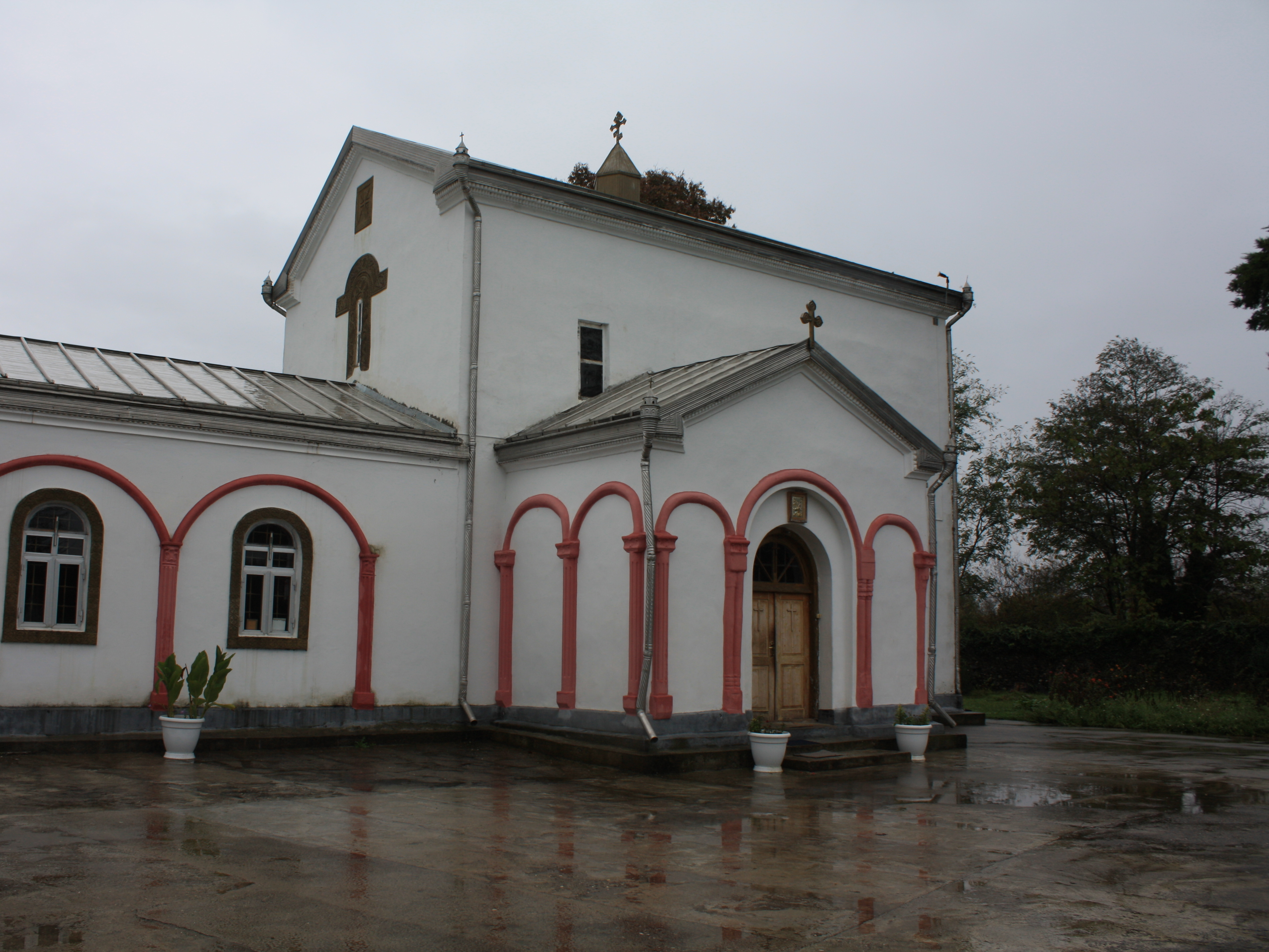
- Ilori church

- Location within Georgia Location within Abkhazia
- Coordinates: 42°42′N 41°30′E
- Country: Georgia
- Partially recognized independent country: Abkhazia
- District: Ochamchira
- Time zone: UTC+3 (MSK)
  - Summer (DST): UTC+4

Ilori (Georgian: ილორი; Abkhaz: Елыр, Elyr; Russian: Илори) is a village in the Ochamchira District of Abkhazia, Georgia, located on the coast of the Black Sea. The elevation of the village is 10 meters above sea level. The location was first mentioned in the 11th century, AD. During the Middle Ages, Ilori became a part of the Principality of Odishi. The village is home to one of the most important western Georgian architectural sites of the Medieval Period, The Church of St. George of Ilori which was constructed in the first quarter of the 11th century, AD.

Ilori is also the site of Elyr-nykha – one of the seven shrines of the Abkhaz traditional religion.

== See also ==
- Ochamchira District
