= Mokvi Cathedral =

Georgian Orthodox cathedral

Mokvi Cathedral მოქვის ეკლესია
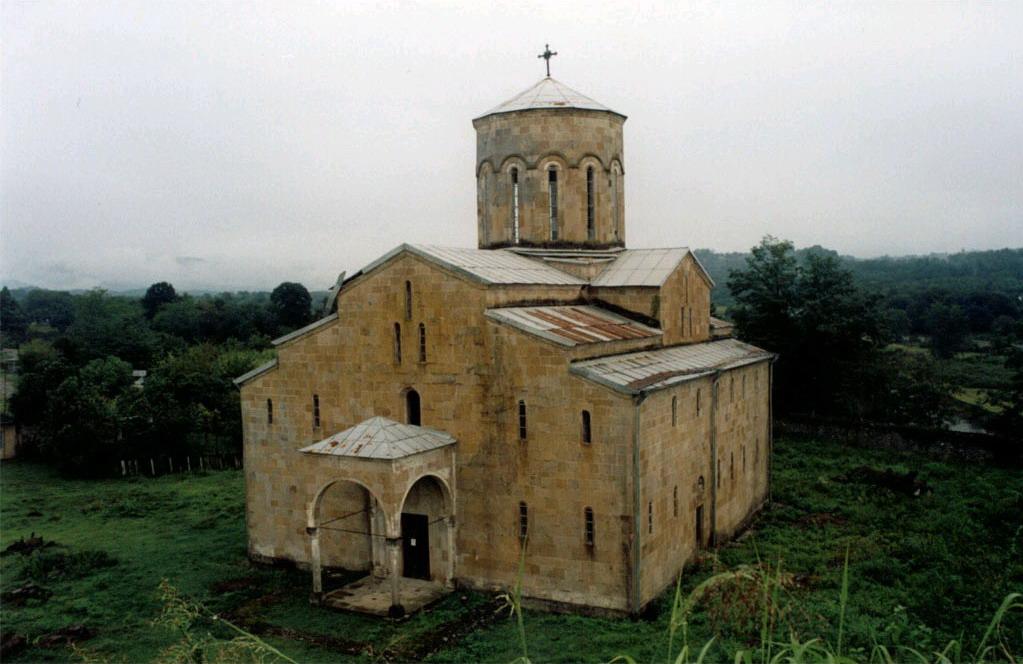
- Mokvi Cathedral

- Location within Georgia Location within Abkhazia

Religion
- Affiliation: Georgian Orthodox Church
- District: Ochamchire Municipality
- Region: Caucasus

Location
- Location: Mokvi, Ochamchire Municipality, Georgia/Abkhazia
- Coordinates: 42.835°N 41.507778°E

Architecture
- Style: Georgian; Cathedral
- Completed: 10th century during the reign of King Leon III of Abkhazia
- Dome: 1

Mokvi Cathedral (Georgian: მოქვის ეკლესია) is a Georgian Orthodox Cathedral located in Mokvi, in the Ochamchire Municipality of the de facto independent Republic of Abkhazia, internationally recognized to constitute a part of Georgia.

Mokvi Cathedral consists of five naves, built in the third quarter of the 10th century, during the reign of king Leon III of Abkhazia. According to a non-extant inscription (found by Patriarch Dositheos II of Jerusalem who visited Mokvi in 1659) the church was painted during the reign of Emperor Alexios I Komnenos and David IV of Georgia. In the Catholicate of Abkhazia, Mokvi was the seat of a bishop at least until the 17th century.

== Historical -architectural description ==
Over the centuries, Mokvi was a significant center of Georgian culture, where manuscripts were copied and old codices were renovated. Up to now preserved are manuscripts from the Mokvi church library, bearing names of the persons active in Mokvi. Among Mokvi antiquities of special significance and artistic value is the famous Mokvi Four Gospels, commissioned by Daniel Mokveli (Bishop of Mokvi) in 1300. Mokvi church, the center of such a vast cultural activity, was also rich in epigraphic monuments. However, at present, only an inscription on Mokvi bell tower is preserved.

Mokvi eparchy was established in the 10th c., but Mokvi, as one of the most significant centers of the Georgian culture, experienced special efflorescence from the 13th c. onwards. Georgian literary sources have preserved names of the bishops of Mokvi, whose contribution to the Georgian culture is hard to undervalue, such as Grigol Mokveli, Daniel Mokveli, Abraam Mokveli, Eptvime Sakvarelidze, Pilipe Chkhetidze and others.

Mokvi church has a long history. It was substantially renovated and painted in the reign of David IV the Builder (1089-1125); however, no traces of these murals are left at present in the church. In the 1980s, fragments of the presumably 15th c. murals and numerous other Georgian inscriptions were discovered here.

It is a cross-in-square domed church with chapels alongside the naves. The east side has three protruded apses. The middle apse of the altar is horseshoe-shaped from the inside, and has five facets on the outside. The dome is raised on four pillars, which are in the center of the buildings. The sail is the way to move from the square to dome neck. The dome's twelve-facet neck is low. The building is adorned with hewn stone. The facades are simple, without any ornaments. The smooth surfaces are divided into two tiers, by the row of the apertures.

== Online references ==
- Photograph of Mokvi Cathedral
- Photographs and background information (in Russian)
