= Ochamchira District =

Ochamchira District ოჩამჩირის რაიონი Очамчыра араион Очамчырский район
- District
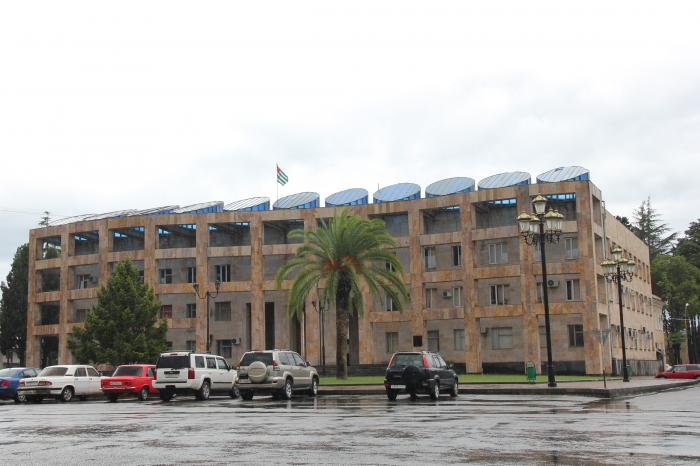
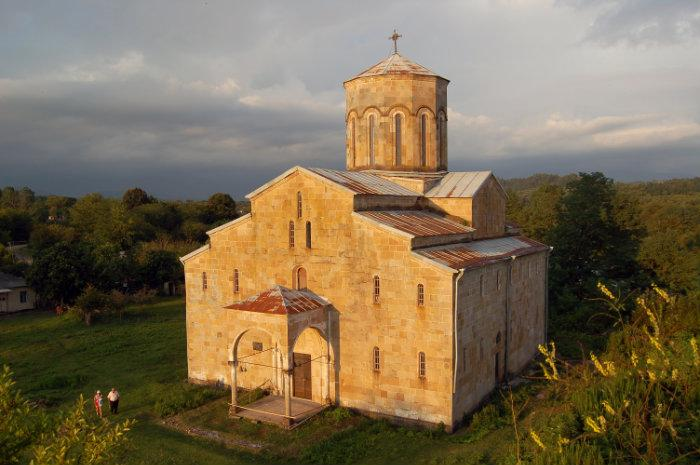
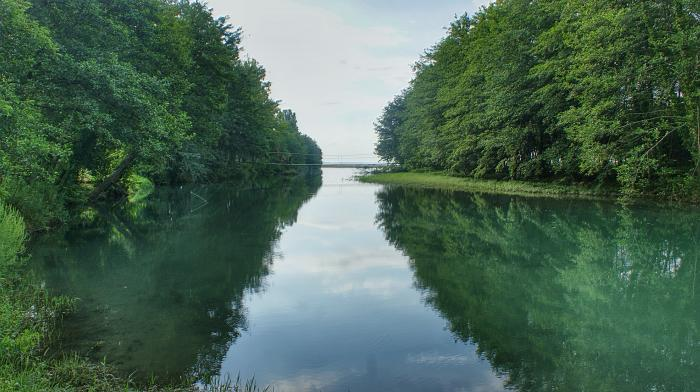
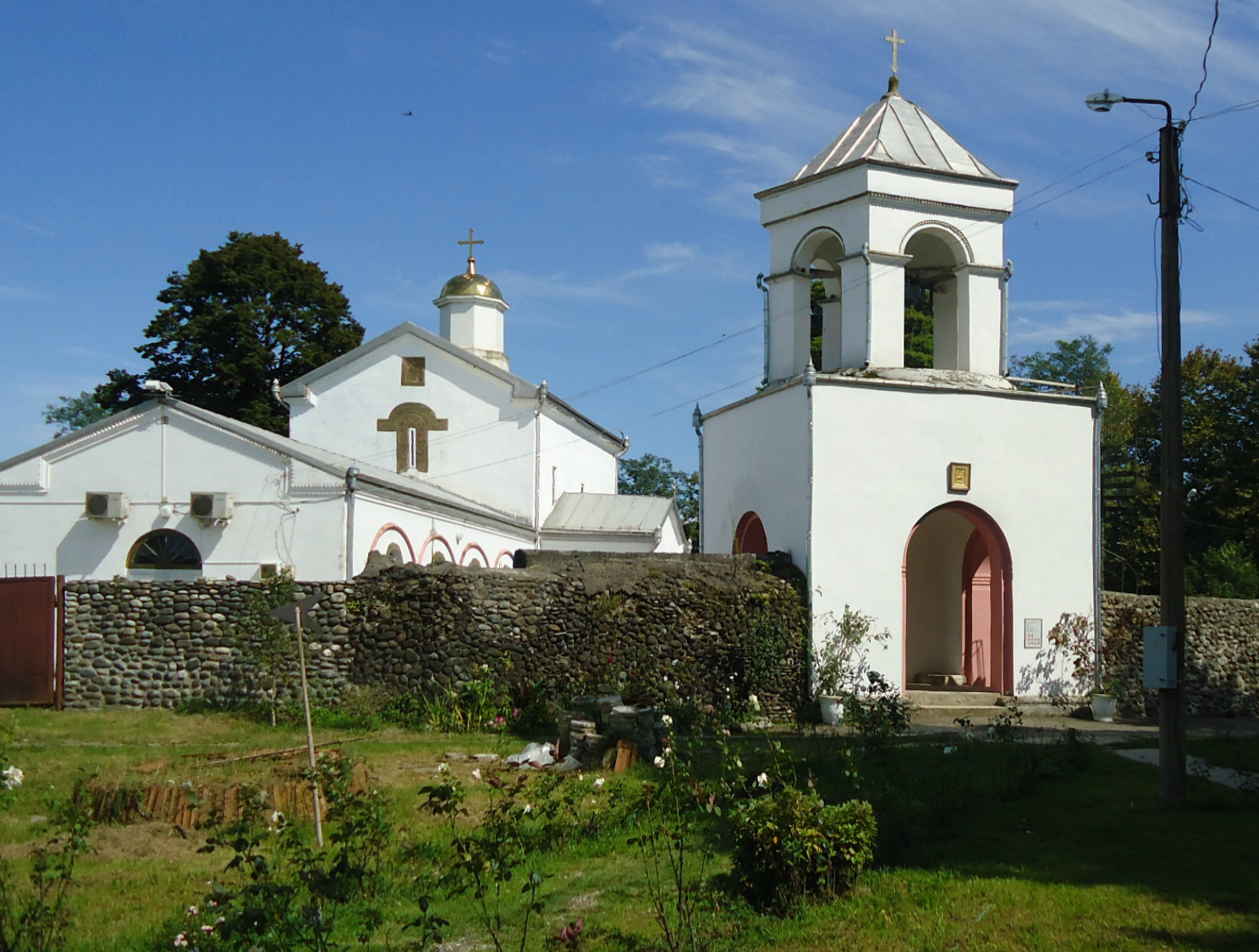
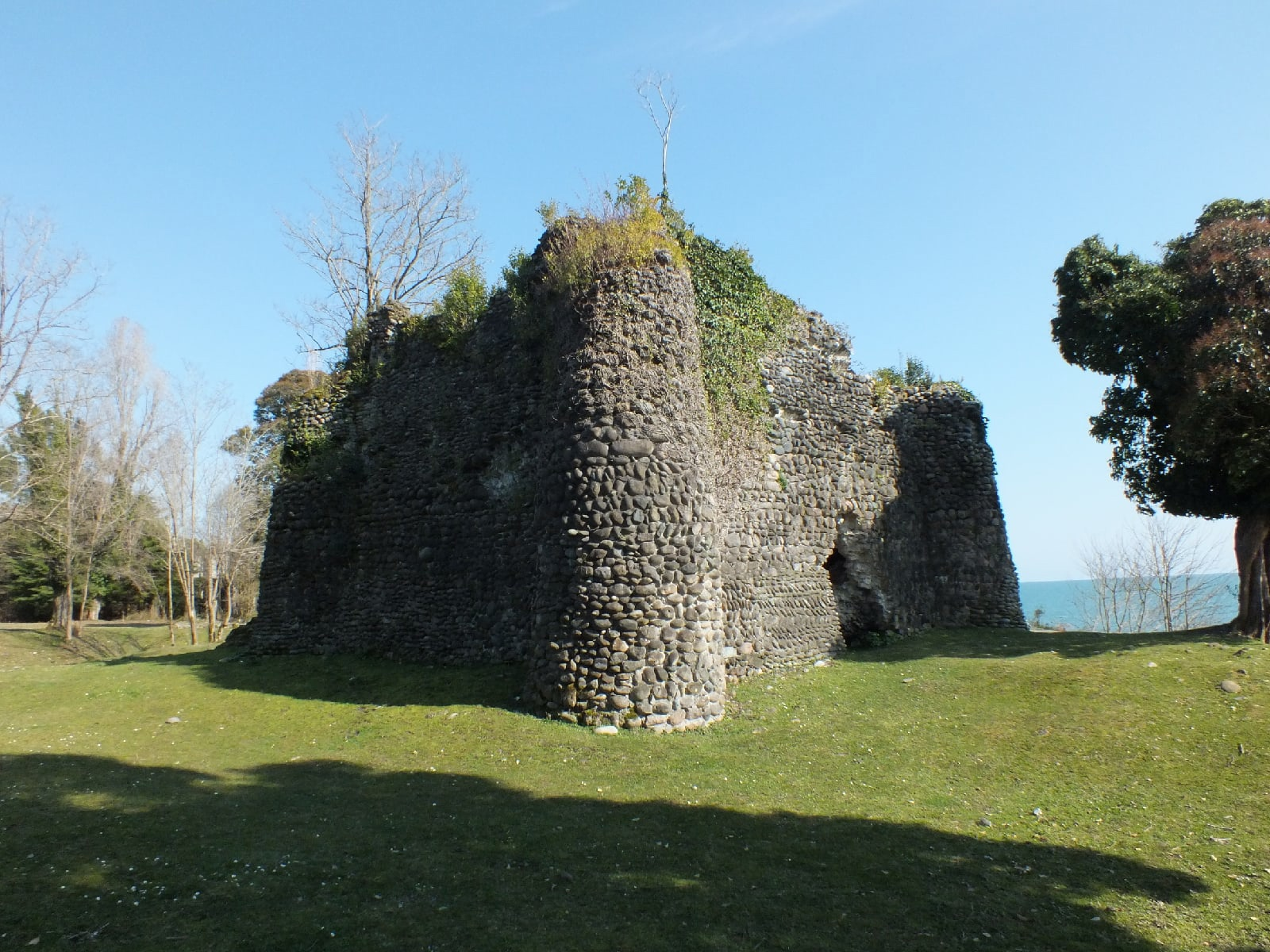
- From the top to bottom-right, Ochamchira, Mokvi Cathedral, Tskrishi, Ilori Church, Kindgi Fortress
- Location of Ochamchira district in Abkhazia
- Coordinates: 42.8581°N 41.4461°E
- Country: Georgia
- De facto state: Abkhazia
- Capital: Ochamchire

Government
  - Administration Head: Khrips Jopua

Area
  - Total: 1,808 km^{2} (698 sq mi)

Population (2011)
  - Total: 24,868
  - Density: 13.75/km^{2} (35.62/sq mi)
- Time zone: UTC+3 (MSK)
- Area differs from the administrative division of Georgia.

Ochamchira District is a district of the partially recognized Abkhazia. Its capital is Ochamchire, the town by the same name. The district is smaller than the Ochamchire district in the de jure subdivision of Georgia, as some of its former territory is now part of Tkvarcheli District, formed by de facto Abkhaz authorities in 1995. The population of the Ochamchira district is 24,629 according to the 2003 census. Until the August 2008 Battle of the Kodori Valley, some mountainous parts of the district were still under Georgian control, as part of Upper Abkhazia.

== Administration ==
In 1997, Khrips Jopua became Head of Administration. Jopua was reappointed on 10 May 2001 following the March 2001 local elections.

After Sergei Bagapsh became president in 2005, he appointed Vladimir Atumava to succeed Appolon Dumaa on 21 February 2005. 22 February 2007 Atumava was released from office and temporarily replaced by his deputy Ramaza Jopua. On 3 April Daur Tarba became the new head of the administration. On 18 December 2008, Tarba asked to be released from office, and he was replaced by Murman Jopua, who had until then been vice head. The new vice head is Zurab Kajaia. Tarba went on to become chairman of United Abkhazia.

On 3 June 2014, following the 2014 Abkhazian political crisis, acting President Valeri Bganba dismissed Murman Jopua, as had been demanded by protesters, and appointed his Deputy Mikhail Agrba as acting District Head. After the election of Raul Khajimba as president, he on 28 October appointed Beslan Akhuba as acting Head in Agrba's stead. On 21 July 2015 Akhuba was in turn replaced by Khrips Jopua as acting Head, who had been Head of the State Repatriation Committee until recently and who had already governed Ochamchira District between 1997 and 2004. On 25 September, Jopua was appointed permanently to the post.

=== List of Administration Heads ===
#	Name	Entered office	Left office	President	Comments
Chairmen of the District Soviet:
	Sergei Bagapsh	1991	1992		
Heads of the District Administration:
	Batal Tapagua	October 1993	September 1995	Vladislav Ardzinba	
	Zaur Zarandia	1995	1998	Vladislav Ardzinba	
	Khrips Jopua	1997	≥ March 2004	Vladislav Ardzinba	
	Appolon Dumaa	≤ July 2004	21 February 2005	Vladislav Ardzinba	
	Vladimir Atumava	21 February 2005	22 February 2007	Sergei Bagapsh	
	Ramaza Jopua	22 February 2007	3 April 2007	Sergei Bagapsh	Acting
	Daur Tarba	3 April 2007	18 December 2008	Sergei Bagapsh	
	Murman Jopua	18 December 2008	29 May 2011	Sergei Bagapsh	
	Murman Jopua	29 May 2011	3 June 2014	Alexander Ankvab	
	Mikhail Agrba	3 June 2014	28 October 2014	Valeri Bganba	Acting
	Beslan Akhuba	28 October 2014	21 July 2015	Raul Khajimba	Acting
	Khrips Jopua	21 July 2015	Present	Raul Khajimba	Second time

== Demographics ==
According to 2011 census, the population of the district was 24 868 people, consisting of:

- Abkhazians (77.7%)
- Georgians (9.5%)
- Armenians (6.6%)
- Russians (3.9%)
- Ukrainians (0.3%)
- Greeks (0.2%)

== Settlements ==
The district's main settlements are:

- Ochamchire
- Ilori
- Labra
- Mokvi

== See also ==
- Administrative divisions of Abkhazia
