= Ochamchire Municipality =

Ochamchire Municipality ოჩამჩირის მუნიციპალიტეტი (Georgian) Очамчыра амуниципалитет (Abkhaz)
- Municipality
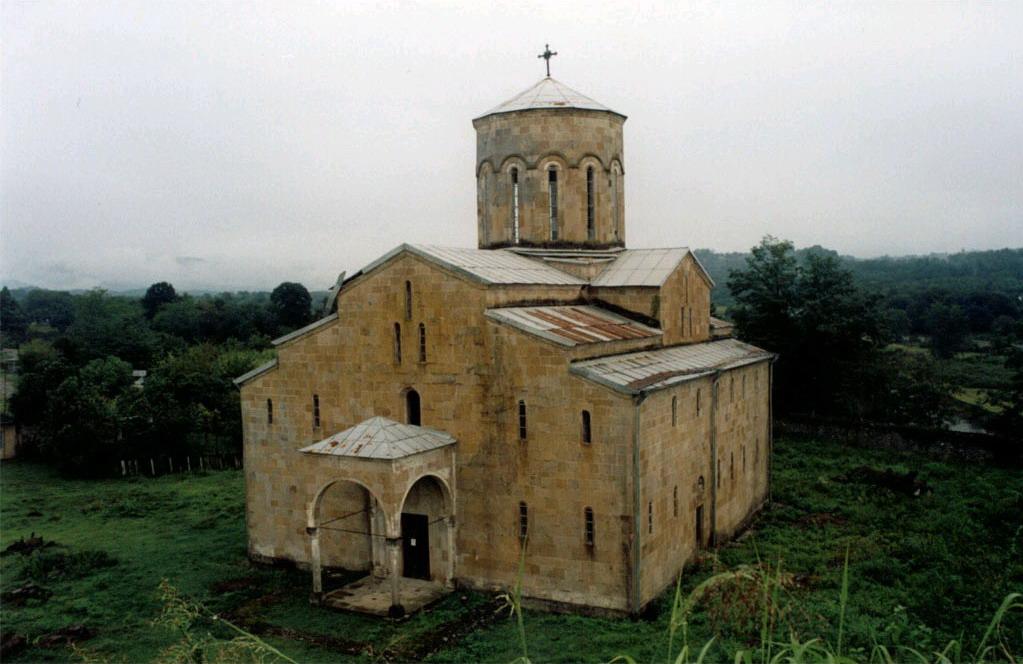
- Mokvi Cathedral in the village of Mokvi

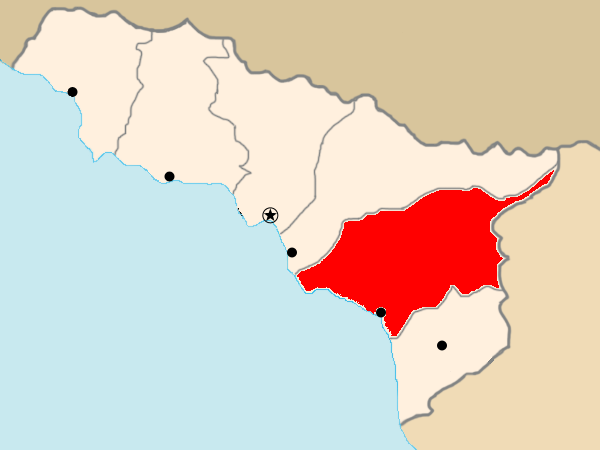
- Location of Ochamchire Municipality in AR of Abkhazia
- Coordinates: 42.8339°N 41.5372°E
- Country: Georgia
- Capital: Ochamchire
- Time zone: UTC+3 (MSK)

Ochamchire Municipality (Georgian: ოჩამჩირის მუნიციპალიტეტი, Očamčiris municip’alit’et’i; Abkhaz: Очамчыра амуниципалитет) is an administrative unit in the Georgian Autonomous Republic of Abkhazia. The capital of the municipality is Ochamchire. Ochamchire Municipality has boundaries with Gulripshi Municipality and Gali Municipality of Autonomous Republic of Abkhazia and Tsalenjikha Municipality of Samegrelo-Zemo Svaneti.
