= 2019 FIA Motorsport Games =

Motorsports competition in Italy

ACI Vallelunga Circuit

The 2019 FIA Motorsport Games was the first edition of the FIA Motorsport Games held at ACI Vallelunga Circuit, Campagnano di Roma from 1 November to 3 November 2019. The games were won by Russia.

== Summary ==
It featured GT3-spec cars, TCR Touring Car, Formula 4, drifting, a karting slalom and eSports disciplines. Only Silver and Bronze drivers were allowed to compete. The event promoters were the Federation Internationale de l'Automobile (FIA) and the Stéphane Ratel Organisation (SRO). Rome was the city that hosted the opening ceremony on 30 October 2019.

The event was contested in the Olympics-style, but because machine-based or motorized sports are not recognised by the Olympic Games organisation they will not be recognised as an Olympic event. "Motorized" events were held at the 1900 Summer Olympics and 1908 Summer Olympics (see Motor racing at the 1900 Summer Olympics and Water motorsports at the 1908 Summer Olympics) but they are not now regarded as official Olympic events.

166 athletes from 49 National FIA member organisations took part. 18 sets of medals were featured in the 6 disciplines.

Team Russia topped the medal table, with one gold medal for Touring Car Cup and three medals (bronze medals in Karting Slalom and Drifting) overall. Team Australia and Team Italy tied on the second place with equal amount of gold (for Digital and Formula 4 Cups respectively) and bronze medals (for GT and Digital Cups respectively). Team Belgium (Touring Car and Karting Slalom Cups) was the only other team to win more than one medal. 13 different national teams received at least one medal.

== Schedule ==
A provisional schedule was revealed on 30 August 2019.

30 October	1 November	2 November	3 November
Opening ceremony
Opening ceremony	GT Cup Practice 1	Touring Car Cup Qualifying 1 & 2	GT Cup Race 2
Opening ceremony	F4 Cup Practice 1	F4 Cup Qualifying	F4 Cup Main Race
Opening ceremony	Digital Cup Practice	GT Cup Qualifying	Karting Slalom Cup Knockout Rounds and Final
Opening ceremony	Touring Car Cup Practice 1	Karting Slalom Cup Practice	Touring Car Cup Race 2
Opening ceremony	GT Cup Practice 2	F4 Cup Qualifying Race	GT Cup Main race
Opening ceremony	Touring Car Cup Practice 2	Touring Car Cup Race 1	Closing ceremony and prize-giving
Opening ceremony	F4 Cup Practice 2	GT Cup Race 1	Closing ceremony and prize-giving
Opening ceremony	Drifting Cup Practice & Qualifying	Digital Cup Practice	Closing ceremony and prize-giving
Opening ceremony		Karting Slalom Cup Qualifying	Closing ceremony and prize-giving
Opening ceremony		Drifting Cup Knockout Rounds and Final	Closing ceremony and prize-giving
Opening ceremony		Digital Cup Qualifying and Final	Closing ceremony and prize-giving

== Participants ==
=== Teams ===
Team France, Team Italy, Team Kuwait and Team Russia are the only teams with confirmed line-up in all six cups.

Host Nation (Italy)

Team	GT	Touring Car	F4	Karting Slalom	Drifting	Digital	Total
Team Albania	No	No	No	Yes	No	No	1
Team Austria	No	No	No	Yes	Yes	No	2
Team Australia	Yes	No	Yes	No	No	Yes	3
Team Belarus	Yes	No	No	Yes	Yes	Yes	4
Team Belgium	Yes	Yes	Yes	Yes	No	Yes	5
Team Brazil	No	No	Yes	No	No	No	1
Team China	Yes	Yes	No	No	No	Yes	3
Team Chinese Taipei	Yes	No	No	No	No	Yes	2
Team Costa Rica	No	No	No	No	No	Yes	1
Team Croatia	No	No	No	Yes	No	No	1
Team Czech Republic	No	Yes	Yes	No	Yes	Yes	4
Team Denmark	Yes	No	Yes	Yes	Yes	Yes	5
Team Estonia	No	No	No	No	Yes	No	1
Team Finland	No	No	Yes	No	Yes	No	2
Team France	Yes	Yes	Yes	Yes	Yes	Yes	6
(Georgia (country)) Team Georgia	No	No	No	Yes	Yes	Yes	3
Team Germany	Yes	Yes	Yes	Yes	No	Yes	5
Team Hong Kong	Yes	Yes	Yes	No	No	Yes	4
Team Hungary	No	Yes	Yes	Yes	Yes	Yes	5
Team India	No	No	No	Yes	No	No	1
(Republic of Ireland) Team Ireland	No	No	Yes	No	No	Yes	2
Team Israel	No	No	Yes	Yes	No	No	2
Team Italy	Yes	Yes	Yes	Yes	Yes	Yes	6
Team Japan	Yes	No	Yes	No	No	No	2
Team Kuwait	Yes	Yes	Yes	Yes	Yes	Yes	6
Team Latvia	No	Yes	No	Yes	Yes	Yes	4
Team Lithuania	No	Yes	No	Yes	Yes	Yes	4
Team Malaysia	Yes	No	Yes	No	No	Yes	3
Team Malta	No	No	No	No	Yes	No	1
Team Mexico	No	No	No	Yes	No	Yes	2
Team Netherlands	No	Yes	No	Yes	No	Yes	3
Team New Zealand	No	Yes	Yes	No	No	No	2
Team North Macedonia	No	No	No	No	No	Yes	1
Team Norway	No	Yes	No	Yes	Yes	Yes	4
Team Poland	Yes	No	No	Yes	No	Yes	3
Team Portugal	Yes	No	Yes	Yes	Yes	No	4
Team Romania	No	No	No	No	Yes	No	1
Team Russia	Yes	Yes	Yes	Yes	Yes	Yes	6
Team Serbia	No	No	No	Yes	No	No	1
Team Singapore	No	No	No	No	No	Yes	1
Team Slovakia	No	Yes	No	Yes	Yes	Yes	4
Team Spain	Yes	Yes	Yes	No	No	No	3
Team Sweden	No	Yes	No	Yes	Yes	Yes	4
Team Switzerland	Yes	No	No	No	Yes	Yes	3
Team Thailand	Yes	No	No	Yes	No	Yes	3
Team Turkey	Yes	No	No	No	No	No	1
Team Ukraine	No	No	No	Yes	Yes	No	2
(United Kingdom) Team UK	Yes	Yes	No	Yes	No	Yes	4
(United States) Team USA	Yes	Yes	No	No	No	No	2

=== Athletes ===
Team	Event					
Team	GT Cup	Touring Car	Formula 4	Karting Slalom	Drifting	eSports
Team Albania	–	–	–	Alexia Karaguni; Kristofor Mjeshtri	–	–
Team Australia	Brenton Grove; Stephen Grove	–	Luis Leeds	–	–	Cody Nikola Latkovski
Team Austria	–	–	–	Jorden Dolischka; Charlie Wurz	Daniel Brandner	–
Team Belarus	Alexander Talkanitsa Jr. Alexander Talkanitsa Sr.	–	–	Aliaksei Savin; Kseniya Shuba	Dzmitry Nahula	Kirill Piletsky
Team Belgium	Louis Machiels; Nico Verdonck	Gilles Magnus	Nicolas Baert	Manon Degotte; Antoine Morlet	–	Félix Ferir
Team Brazil	–	–	João Rosate	–	–	–
Team China	Kan Zang; Ya-Qi Zhang	Zhen-Dong Zhang	–	–	–	Yin Zheng
Team Chinese Taipei	Evan Chen; Po-Heng Lin	–	–	–	–	Yi-Teng Chou
Team Costa Rica	–	–	–	–	–	Bernal Valverde
Team Croatia	–	–	–	Sandro Ivanjko; Stefani Mogoroviić	–	–
Team Czech Republic	–	Dušan Kouřil Jr.	Václav Šafář	–	Michal Reichert	Filip Mareš
Team Denmark	Jens Reno Møller; Christina Nielsen	–	Malthe Jakobsen	Jonas Jakobsen; Sarah Kronborg Madsen	Dennis Hansen	Ian Andersen
Team Estonia	–	–	–	–	Ao Vaida	–
Team Finland	–	–	William Alatalo	–	Juha Pöytälaakso	–
Team France	Jean-Luc Beaubelique; Jim Pla	John Filippi	Reshad de Gerus	Esteban Masson; Doriane Pin	Benjamin Boulbes	Kevin Leaune
(Georgia (country)) Team Georgia	–	–	–	Elizaveta Bagramovi; Nika Kobosnidze	Mevlud Meladze	Archil Tsimakuridze
Team Germany	Steffen Görig; Alfred Renauer	Luca Engstler	Niklas Krütten	Janina Burkard; Florian Vietze	–	Mikail Hizal
Team Greece	–	–	–	–	Stavros Grillis	–
Team Hong Kong	Paul Ip; Ying-Kin Lee	Ka-To Jim	Hugo Hung	–	–	Yat-Lam Law
Team Hungary	–	Norbert Kiss	László Tóth	Dorka Kiss; Bálint Németh	Zoltán Szántó	Benjámin Báder
Team India	–	–	–	Suriyavarathan Karthikeyan; Shravanthika Lakshmi Shyam Kumar	–	–
(Republic of Ireland) Team Ireland	–	–	Lucca Allen	–	–	Keith Dempsey
Team Israel	–	–	Ido Cohen	Yarven Oved; Ben Pinto	–	–
Team Italy	Gianluca Roda; Giorgio Roda	Enrico Bettera	Andrea Rosso	Paolo Gallo Emma Segattini	Federico Sceriffo	Stefano Conte
Team Japan	Hiroshi Hamaguchi; Ukyo Sasahara	–	Kazuto Kotaka	–	–	–
Team Kuwait	Zaid Ashkanani; Khaled Al-Mudhaf	Salem Al-Nusif	Mohammed Al-Nusif	Hessa Al-Fares; Marshad Al-Marshad	Ali Makhseed	Rashed Al-Rashdan
Team Latvia	–	Valters Zviedris	–	Emīlija Bertāne; Nicolass Bertāns	Edmunds Berzins	Kriss Jaunzemis
Team Lithuania	–	Julius Adomavičius	–	Skaistė Petrauskaitė; Kajus Šikšnelis	Benediktas Čirba	Martynas Sidunovas
Team Malaysia	Adrian Henry D'Silva; Weiron Tan	–	Jasper Thong	–	–	Mior Hafiz
Team Malta	–	–	–	–	Kane Pisani	–
Team Mexico	–	–	–	lavio Emil Bustamante Abed; Andrea Sierra Ruíz	–	Daniel Gutierrez
Team Netherlands	–	Tom Coronel	–	Nina Pothof; Bastiaan van Loenen	–	Leon Ackermann
Team New Zealand	–	Faine Kahia	Flynn Mullany	–	–	–
Team North Macedonia	–	–	–	–	–	Valentin Latkovski
Team Norway	–	Kristian Sætheren	–	Marcus Myrseth; Mina Louise Nielsen Pedersen	Odd-Helge Helstad	Tommy Østgård
Team Poland	Artur Janosz; Andrzej Lewandowski	–	–	Krzysztof Gardziel; Sara Sandra Kałuzińska	–	Marcin Świderek
Team Portugal	Henrique Chaves; Miguel Ramos	–	Mariano Pires	Martim Fidalgo; Matilde Fidalgo	Diogo Manuel Dias Correia	–
Team Romania	–	–	–	–	Vlad Andrei Stanescu	–
Team Russia	Denis Bulatov; Rinat Salikhov	Klim Gavrilov	Pavel Bulantsev	Vladislav Bushuev; Olesya Vashchuk	Ilya Fedorov	Vasily Anufriev
Team Serbia	–	–	–	Aleksa Lazarac; Nikola Tošić	–	–
Team Singapore	–	–	–	–	–	Charles Theseira
Team Slovakia	–	Maťo Homola	–	Barbora Bauerová; Michal Vilim	János Onódi	Dávid Nemček
Team Spain	Alvaro Lobera; Fernando Navarrete Jr.	Gonzalo de Andrés	Belén García	–	–	–
Team Sweden	–	Jessica Bäckman	–	Anna Glaerum; Alxander Spetz	Christian Erlandsson	Robin Noborg
Team Switzerland	Christoph Lenz; Patric Niederhauser	–	–	–	Yves Meyer	Fredy Eugster
Team Thailand	Vutthikorn Inthraphuvasak; Kantadhee Kusiri	–	–	Sitavee Limnantharak; Ananthorn Tangniannatchai	–	Thananon Inthongsuk
Team Turkey	Ayhancan Güven; Salih Yoluç	–	–	–	–	–
Team Ukraine	–	–	–	Veronika Kononenko; Heorhii Krasko	Dmitriy Illyuk	–
Team United Kingdom	Chris Froggatt; Felicity Haigh	Rory Butcher	–	Jessica Edgar; Samuel Shaw	–	James Baldwin
Team United States	Robert Ferriol; Spencer Pumpelly	Mason Filippi	–	–	–	–

== Medal table ==
* Host nation (Italy)

2019 FIA Motorsport Games medal table
Rank	Nation	Gold	Silver	Bronze	Total
1	Russia (RUS)	1	0	2	3
2	Australia (AUS)	1	0	1	2
2	Italy (ITA)*	1	0	1	2
4	Japan (JPN)	1	0	0	1
4	Netherlands (NLD)	1	0	0	1
4	Ukraine (UKR)	1	0	0	1
7	Belgium (BEL)	0	2	0	2
8	Costa Rica (CRI)	0	1	0	1
8	Czech Republic (CZE)	0	1	0	1
8	Germany (DEU)	0	1	0	1
8	Poland (POL)	0	1	0	1
12	Finland (FIN)	0	0	1	1
12	Slovakia (SVK)	0	0	1	1
Totals (13 entries)		6	6	6	18

Preceded by None	FIA Motorsport Games; Rome; Italy; I Motorsport Olympiad (2019)	Succeeded by Marseille; France
