= Meladze =

Meladze (Georgian: მელაძე) is a Georgian surname. Notable people with the surname include:

- Konstantin Meladze (born 1963), Ukrainian-Russian composer and producer
- Mevlud Meladze (born 1972), Georgian racing driver
- Sergey Meladze (born 1980), Turkmenistan Paralympic powerlifter
- Valery Meladze (born 1965), Russian singer
