= List of European Le Mans Series circuits =

The European Le Mans Series (known from 2004 to 2005 as the Le Mans Endurance Series and from 2006 to 2011 as the Le Mans Series) has raced on 19 different circuits across 9 European countries (12 in total) in its 23-year history. The series made forays outside of Europe in 2005 and 2006 to Istanbul Park in Turkey. In the year 2007 to Interlagos in Brazil, and in 2012 to Road Atlanta in the United States.

== Circuits ==
Key
✔	Current circuits (for the 2026 season)	*	Future circuits (for the 2027 season)

Circuit	Type	Location	Seasons	Total	Map
Autodromo Enzo e Dino Ferrari ✔	Race circuit	(Italy) Imola	2011, 2013–2016, 2022, 2024–2026	9	
Autódromo Internacional do Algarve ✔	Race circuit	(Portugal) Portimão	2009–2010, 2017–2026 (Note: Algarve International Circuit hosted 2 rounds in 2023.)	13	
Autodromo Internazionale del Mugello	Race circuit	(Italy) Scarperia e San Piero	2024	1	
Autódromo José Carlos Pace	Race circuit	(Brazil) São Paulo	2007	1	
Autodromo Nazionale di Monza	Race circuit	(Italy) Monza	2004–2005, 2007–2008, 2017–2022	10	
Circuito do Estoril	Race circuit	(Portugal) Estoril	2011, 2014–2016	4	
Circuit de Barcelona-Catalunya ✔	Race circuit	(Spain) Montmeló	2008–2009, 2019, 2021–2026	9	
Circuit de Spa-Francorchamps ✔	Race circuit	(Belgium) Spa	2004–2011, 2016–2026	19	
Circuit Paul Ricard ✔	Race circuit	(France) Le Castellet	2010–2026 (Note: Circuit Paul Ricard hosted 2 rounds in 2020.)	18	
Circuit Ricardo Tormo	Race circuit	(Spain) Cheste	2007	1	
Circuito del Jarama	Race circuit	(Spain) San Sebastián de los Reyes	2006	1	
Donington Park	Race circuit	(United Kingdom) Castle Donington	2006, 2012	2	
Hungaroring	Race circuit	(Hungary) Mogyoród	2010, 2013	2	
Istanbul Park	Race circuit	(Turkey) Tuzla	2005–2006	2	
MotorLand Aragón	Race circuit	(Spain) Alcañiz	2023	1	
Nürburgring	Race circuit	(Germany) Nürburg	2004–2009	6	
Red Bull Ring	Race circuit	(Austria) Spielberg	2013–2018, 2021	7	
Road Atlanta	Race circuit	(United States) Braselton, Georgia	2012	1	
Silverstone Circuit ✔	Race circuit	(United Kingdom) Silverstone	2004–2005, 2007–2011, 2013–2019, 2025–2026	16	

== By country ==
Country	Races	First	Last	Circuits
Austria	7	2013	2021	1 (Red Bull Ring)
Belgium	19	2004	2026	1 (Circuit de Spa-Francorchamps)
Brazil	1	2007	2007	1 (Interlagos Circuit)
France	18	2010	2026	1 (Circuit Paul Ricard)
Germany	6	2004	2009	1 (Nürburgring)
Hungary	2	2010	2013	1 (Hungaroring)
Italy	20	2004	2026	3 (Monza Circuit, Imola Circuit, Mugello Circuit)
Portugal	17	2009	2026	2 (Algarve International Circuit, Circuito do Estoril)
Spain	12	2006	2026	4 (Circuito del Jarama, Circuit Ricardo Tormo, Circuit de Barcelona-Catalunya, MotorLand Aragón)
Turkey	2	2005	2006	1 (Istanbul Park)
United Kingdom	18	2004	2026	2 (Silverstone Circuit, Donington Park)
United States	1	2012	2012	1 (Road Atlanta)
