= 2019 FIA Motorsport Games Digital Cup =

Video game competition

Race details
Date	1-2 November
Official name	FIA Motorsport Games Digital Cup
Location	Campagnano di Roma, Italy
- Qualifying

Pole
Driver	(Germany) Mikail Hizal	Team Germany
- Medalists
1st place, gold medalist(s)	(Australia) Cody Nikola Latkovski	Team Australia
2nd place, silver medalist(s)	(Costa Rica) Bernal Valverde	Team Costa Rica
3rd place, bronze medalist(s)	(Italy) Stefano Conte	Team Italy

The FIA Motorsport Games Digital Cup was the first FIA Motorsport Games Digital Cup, to be held at the ACI Vallelunga Circuit, Italy from 1 November to 2 November 2019. The event was the part of the 2019 FIA Motorsport Games.

== Entry list ==
Team	No.	Driver name
Team Switzerland	1	Fredy Eugster
Team Hong Kong	2	Yat Lam Law
Team Lithuania	3	Martynas Sidunovas
Team Russia	4	Vasily Anufriev
Team Norway	5	Tommy Østgaard
Team Latvia	6	Kriss Jaunzemis
Team Chinese Taipei	7	Yi Teng Chou
Team Denmark	8	Ian Andersen
(Georgia (country)) Team Georgia	9	Archil Tsimakuridze
Team Thailand	10	Thananon Inthongsuk
(Republic of Ireland) Team Ireland	11	Keith Dempsey
Team Poland	12	Marcin Świderek
Team Australia	13	Cody Nikola Latkovski
(United Kingdom) Team UK	14	James Baldwin
(North Macedonia) Team Macedonia	15	Valentin Latkovski
Team Hungary	16	Benjámin Báder
Team Mexico	17	Daniel Gutierrez
Team Costa Rica	18	Bernal Valverde
Team Slovakia	19	Dávid Nemček
Team Belgium	20	Félix Ferir
Team Germany	21	Mikail Hizal
Team Belarus	22	Kirill Piletsky
Team Czech Republic	23	Filip Mareš
Team Malaysia	24	Mior Hafiz
Team China	25	Yin Zheng
Team Singapore	26	Charles Theseira
Team Italy	27	Stefano Conte
Team France	28	Kevin Leaune
Team Kuwait	29	Rashed Alrashdan
Team Sweden	30	Robin Noborg
Team Netherlands	31	Leon Ackermann

=== Qualifying ===
Pos.	No.	Driver name	Team	Time
1	21	Mikail Hizal	Team Germany	1:28.871
2	13	Cody Nikola Latkovski	Team Australia	1:29.294
3	27	Stefano Conte	Team Italy	1:29.556
4	14	James Baldwin	(United Kingdom) Team UK	1:29.573
5	5	Tommy Østgaard	Team Norway	1:29.582
6	16	Benjámin Báder	Team Hungary	1:29.849
7	12	Marcin Świderek	Team Poland	1:29.915
8	7	Yi Teng Chou	Team Chinese Taipei	1:30.220
9	6	Kriss Jaunzemis	Team Latvia	1:30.244
10	11	Keith Dempsey	(Republic of Ireland) Team Ireland	1:30.267
11	31	Leon Ackermann	Team Netherlands	1:30.291
12	1	Fredy Eugster	Team Switzerland	1:30.315
13	30	Robin Noborg	Team Sweden	1:30.351
14	24	Mior Hafiz	Team Malaysia	1:30.428
15	8	Ian Andersen	Team Denmark	1:30.448
16	3	Martynas Sidunovas	Team Lithuania	1:30.590
17	26	Charles Theseira	Team Singapore	1:30.636
18	2	Yat Lam Law	Team Hong Kong	1:30.692
19	10	Thananon lnthongsuk	Team Thailand	1:30.720
20	20	Félix Ferir	Team Belgium	1:30.805
21	18	Bernal Valverde	Team Costa Rica	1:30.934
22	9	Archil Tsimakuridze	(Georgia (country)) Team Georgia	1:30.970
23	25	Yin Zheng	Team China	1:30.988
24	4	Vasily Anufriev	Team Russia	1:31.035
25	22	Kirill Piletsky	Team Belarus	1:31.612
26	19	Dávid Nemček	Team Slovakia	1:31.669
27	17	Daniel Gutierrez	Team Mexico	1:33.349
28	15	Valentin Latkovski	(North Macedonia) Team Macedonia	1:33.512
29	23	Filip Mareš	Team Czech Republic	1:33.839
30	29	Rashed Alrashdan	Team Kuwait	1:34.973

=== Semi-finals and Repechage ===
Drivers qualified for the Finale highlighted in green. Drivers qualified for the Repechage highlighted in blue.

==== Semi-final group A ====
Pos.	No.	Driver name	Team	Time
1	21	Mikail Hizal	Team Germany	19:18.194
2	16	Benjámin Báder	Team Hungary	19:29.951
3	12	Marcin Świderek	Team Poland	19:30.573
4	30	Robin Noborg	Team Sweden	19:32.683
5	10	Thananon lnthongsuk	Team Thailand	19:36.993
6	1	Fredy Eugster	Team Switzerland	19:37.060
7	4	Vasily Anufriev	Team Russia	19:38.950
8	2	Yat Lam Law	Team Hong Kong	19:43.347
9	22	Kirill Piletsky	Team Belarus	19:48.297
10	29	Rashed Alrashdan	Team Kuwait	20:19.675

==== Semi-final group B ====
Pos.	No.	Driver name	Team	Time
1	13	Cody Nikola Latkovski	Team Australia	19:18.194
2	5	Tommy Østgaard	Team Norway	19:29.951
3	7	Yi Teng Chou	Team Chinese Taipei	19:30.573
4	31	Leon Ackermann	Team Netherlands	19:32.683
5	24	Mior Hafiz	Team Malaysia	19:36.993
6	20	Félix Ferir	Team Belgium	19:37.060
7	25	Yin Zheng	Team China	19:38.950
8	26	Charles Theseira	Team Singapore	19:43.347
9	19	Dávid Nemček	Team Slovakia	19:48.297
10	23	Filip Mareš	Team Czech Republic	20:19.675

==== Semi-final group C ====
Pos.	No.	Driver name	Team	Time
1	18	Bernal Valverde	Team Costa Rica	19:25.437
2	27	Stefano Conte	Team Italy	19:25.593
3	14	James Baldwin	(United Kingdom) Team UK	19:25.757
4	8	Ian Andersen	Team Denmark	19:30.977
5	6	Kriss Jaunzemis	Team Latvia	19:31.830
6	11	Keith Dempsey	(Republic of Ireland) Team Ireland	19:33.805
7	3	Martynas Sidunovas	Team Lithuania	19:36.559
8	9	Archil Tsimakuridze	(Georgia (country)) Team Georgia	19:42.316
9	15	Valentin Latkovski	(North Macedonia) Team Macedonia	19:57.747
10	17	Daniel Gutierrez	Team Mexico	20:06.679

==== Repechage ====
Pos.	No.	Driver name	Team	Time
1	31	Leon Ackermann	Team Netherlands	14:09.240
2	30	Robin Noborg	Team Sweden	14:09.899
3	24	Mior Hafiz	Team Malaysia	14:17.463
4	1	Fredy Eugster	Team Switzerland	14:18.321
5	20	Félix Ferir	Team Belgium	14:19.825
6	6	Kriss Jaunzemis	Team Latvia	14:21.728
7	3	Martynas Sidunovas	Team Lithuania	14:25.052
8	8	Ian Andersen	Team Denmark	14:25.327
9	11	Keith Dempsey	(Republic of Ireland) Team Ireland	14:28.867
10	4	Vasily Anufriev	Team Russia	14:29.654
11	10	Thananon lnthongsuk	Team Thailand	14:30.732
12	25	Yin Zheng	Team China	14:38.109

=== Grand Final ===
Pos.	No.	Driver name	Team	Time
1st place, gold medalist(s)	13	Cody Nikola Latkovski	Team Australia	28:51.134
2nd place, silver medalist(s)	18	Bernal Valverde	Team Costa Rica	28:53.370
3rd place, bronze medalist(s)	27	Stefano Conte	Team Italy	29:01.365
4	14	James Baldwin	(United Kingdom) Team UK	29:01.751
5	30	Robin Noborg	Team Sweden	29:04.296
6	21	Mikail Hizal	Team Germany	29:07.529
7	12	Marcin Świderek	Team Poland	29:10.298
8	24	Mior Hafiz	Team Malaysia	29:16.236
9	31	Leon Ackermann	Team Netherlands	29:18.926
10	16	Benjámin Báder	Team Hungary	29:19.230
11	5	Tommy Østgaard	Team Norway	29:23.840
12	7	Yi Teng Chou	Team Chinese Taipei	29:29.065
Fastest lap: Tommy Østgaard 1:27.579
