= Formula Alfa =

Junior formula racing series

Category	Single seaters
Active	2012-present
Country/region	Georgia
Championships	Georgia
Constructor	AKKS
Engine	Alfa Romeo
Last Drivers' Champions	(Georgia (country)) Nika Adeishvili (Georgia (country)) Lasha Nadirashvili (Georgia (country)) Mevlud Meladze (Georgia (country)) Sandro Tavartkiladze

Formula Alfa is a junior formula racing series held in Georgia. It is intended to function as the young kart racing graduate's first experience of car racing.

In Georgia Formula Alfa was introduced in 2012 with 10-12 cars on the starting grid. From 2014 onwards the number of participants reached 20 that turned the series into the most competitive championship among post-Soviet states.

== Origins ==
The concept of the series was designed and developed by AKKS engineering company based in Moscow, Russia. General idea was masterminded by racing promoter Jury Kim, with styling by Alexander Zakharov, a famous Russian automotive artist. Chassis has been developed by Alexander Ekserdzhan, Alexander Antonov and Grigori Menshenin. AKKS began marketing the car in 2000, with the first of its championships being held in Saint Petersburg in 2002. From 2007 AKKS ceased to support the series, following which all cars were conveyed to the ADM Raceway for inspection and rebuild. In 2011 more than 30 cars with a stock of parts and new engines has been delivered to Rustavi Motorpark just before the end of its total reconstruction.

== Overview ==
The Championship is based at Rustavi, while two races are held at the Istanbul F1 circuit. Due to a mild winter in Georgia, it's possible to get practice almost all year round. To start testing in Formula Alfa, drivers have to be at least fourteen years old. Racing license is not required, but karting experience is crucial for understanding the car behavior. To take part in competitions, drivers can take part in a Licensing Course and get a Georgian national licence. According to FIA rules, drivers from abroad must submit permission from their national motorsports federation.

With 20 cars on the grid and 6-7 events a year, Formula Alfa can be recognized as a reasonable choice for professional career minded drivers if consider 1-mile cost of €21.66 compared to other series using race cars of similar performance. The weak points of the series, however, should be taken into account, like old-fashioned tubular-frame chassis and lack of different race tracks in the calendar.

== Technical information ==
Formula Alfa is a "slicks and wings" formula, that means the use of slick tires and downforce-generating wings. Design of this kind helps competitors to experience special aspects of cornering with an aerodynamic downforce added to the sole weight of the car.

All drivers use the same chassis specifications, as well as engines, tires and other major parts. Alterations are prohibited and are a subject of strict control of technical scrutineers. Engine power must not exceed 135 hp measured at the rear wheels at post-race dyno testing. Car setup, like brake balance, suspension and wing angles adjustment, is allowed.

=== Engine ===
- Alfa Romeo Twin Spark 16V
- Volume: 2 liters
- Number of cylinders: 4
- Number of valves: 16
- Power: 197HP
- Torque: 187 Nm at 3500 min^{−1}

=== Transmission ===
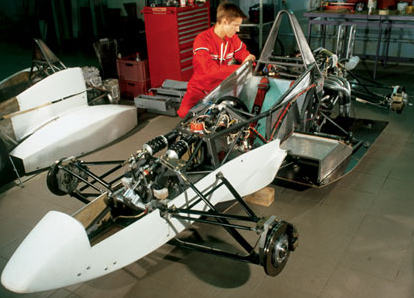
vehicle assembly

- Clutch: dry type, one-disk
- Gearbox: Hewland LD-200-5
- Number of gears: 5

=== Chassis ===
- Space frame made of rectangular steel tubes
- Body panels: fiberglass plastics

=== Suspension ===
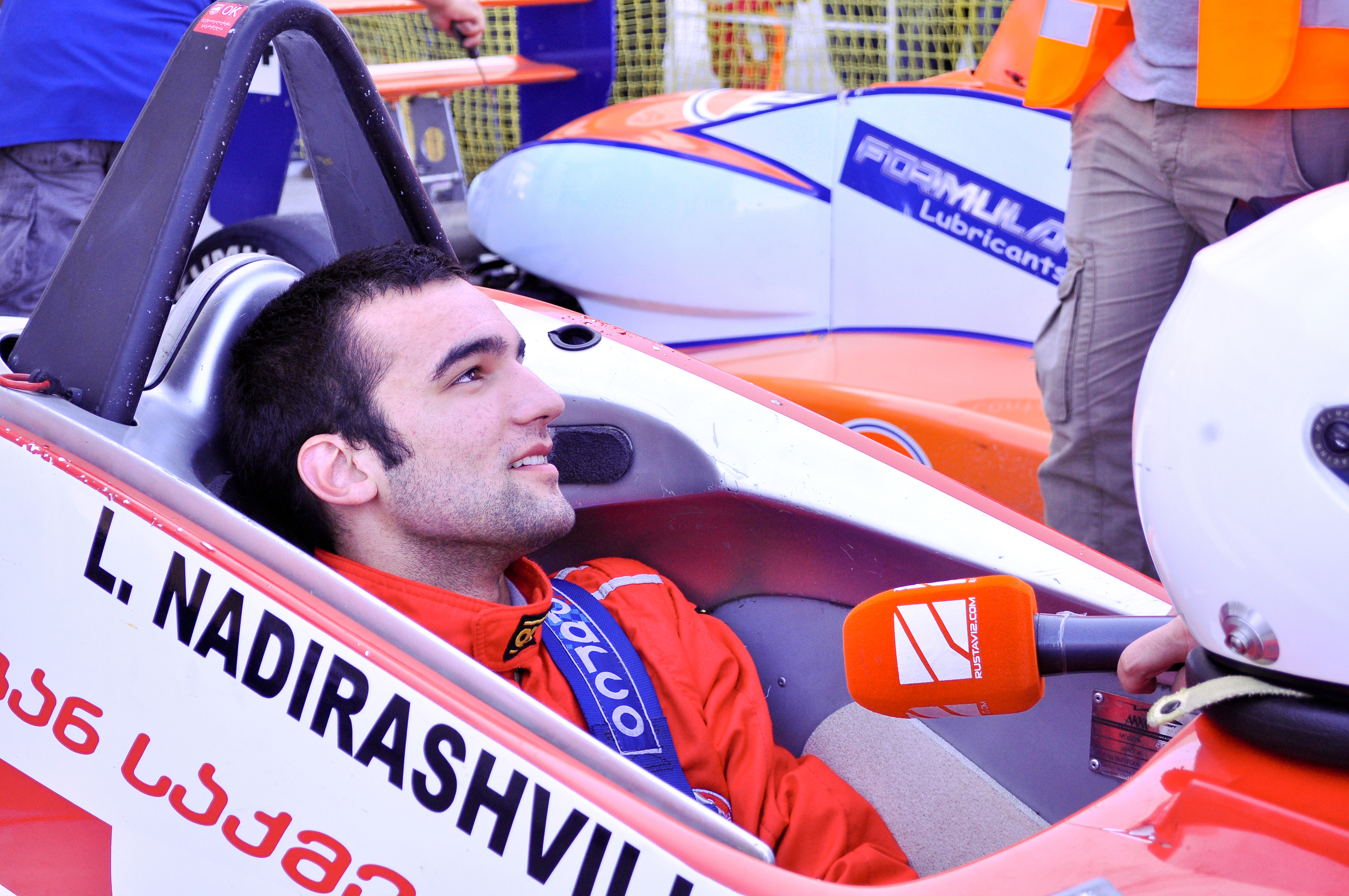
Formula Alfa driver

- Double A-arm design with inboard tubular shock absorbers inside coil springs
- Adjustable antiroll bars
- Sachs shocks
- AKKS springs

=== Brakes ===
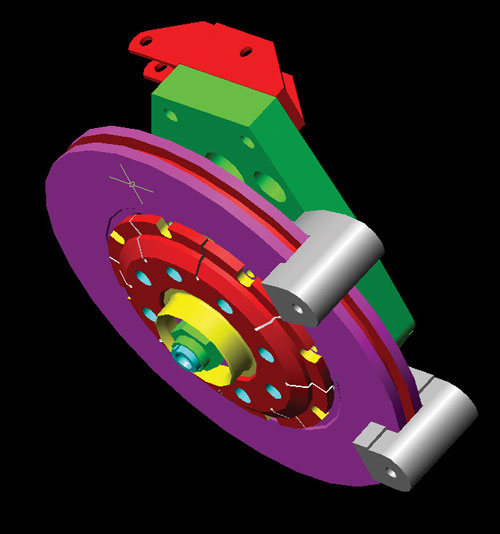
brake caliper assembly

- Brake disks: Brembo
- Pads: Ferodo Racing

=== Wheels ===
- Wheek rims: OZ
- Tires: Hankook 180/550R13 front, 240/570R13 rear

=== Dimensions ===
- Overall length/width: 4400 mm / 1850 mm
- Curb weight: 550 kg

== Sporting regulations ==
Testing time is not limited at Rustavi circuit, though at the Istanbul Park practice is available only 1–2 days before the event. Change of chassis, engines, tires and parts during a race weekend is also permitted. Despite that, driver's budgets are kept comparatively low due to non-expensive parts, engines and local pricing. In 2015 two races per week-end are scheduled. Each race begins with a formation lap behind the safety car, prior to the rolling start. The pitlane speed is restricted to 60 km/h.

Drivers must wear FIA-specification suits, shoes, body linen, gloves and helmets.

Points for every race are awarded as follows:

Position	1st	2nd	3rd	4th	5th	6th	7th	8th	9th	10th	11th	12th	13th	14th	15th
Points	30	25	22	20	18	16	14	12	10	8	6	4	3	2	1

Most rules and regulations of the series are similar to FIA standards

== Event schedule ==
Each weekend begins with 3-4 free practice sessions on Friday. There's also 20 minutes of practice on Saturday morning, followed by the first 20-minute qualifying session. First 10-lap race is scheduled on Saturday afternoon. On Sunday, the timetable is mostly the same, with an addition of opening ceremony in which all competitors must take part. If only one qualifying session can take place, driver's grid position for the Sunday's race should be determined by the second best time of Saturday session.

At home races, as Formula Alfa is the main event of the day, it normally starts right after an opening ceremony to be telecasted live in its entirety on public TV. Alternative broadcast is available on the Internet, captured from 28 track surveillance cameras.

The championship is composed of 6-7 rounds, with two races per round. It lasts from April till November, with a traditional Rustavi International Challenge at the end of a season.

Formula Alfa is sanctioned by the Georgian AutoSport Federation (GASF), the national sporting authority for motor sport recognized by the FIA.

== Champions ==
Season	Series Name	Champion	Team Champion
2012	Championship of Georgia	(Georgia (country)) Nika Adeishvili	(Georgia (country)) Gulf Racing
2013	Championship of Georgia	(Georgia (country)) Lasha Nadirashvili	(Georgia (country)) MIA Force
2014	Championship of Georgia	(Georgia (country)) Mevlud Meladze	(Georgia (country)) Lion Trans
2015	Championship of Georgia	(Georgia (country)) Mevlud Meladze	(Georgia (country)) Lion Trans
2016	Championship of Georgia	(Georgia (country)) Sandro Tavartkiladze	(Georgia (country)) Wissol Team
