= List of Superbike World Championship circuits =

This is a list of circuits which have hosted a Superbike World Championship round from 1988 to 2026. The first circuit that hosted a World Championship round was Donington Park.

== List ==
Key
✔	Current circuits (for the 2026 season) are shown in **bold**.
*	Future circuits (for the 2027 and 2028 seasons) are shown in italic.

Circuit	Location	Direction	Seasons	Total rounds	Map
A1-Ring	(Austria) Spielberg	Clockwise	1988–1994, 1997–1999	10	
Anderstorp Raceway	(Sweden) Anderstorp	Clockwise	1991, 1993	2	
**Autodrom Most** ✔	(Czech Republic) Most	Clockwise	2021–2026	6	
Autodromo di Pergusa	(Italy) Pergusa	Clockwise	1989	1	
Autodromo Enzo e Dino Ferrari	(Italy) Imola	Anti-clockwise	2001–2006, 2009–2019, 2023	18	
**Autódromo Internacional do Algarve** ✔	(Portugal) Portimão	Clockwise	2008–2015, 2017–2026	18	
Autodromo Internazionale del Mugello	(Italy) Scarperia e San Piero	Clockwise	1991–1992, 1994	3	
Autodromo Nazionale di Monza	(Italy) Monza	Clockwise	1990, 1992–1993, 1995–2013	22	
Autodromo Vallelunga Piero Taruffi	(Italy) Campagnano di Roma	Clockwise	2007–2008	2	
**Balaton Park Circuit** ✔	(Hungary) Balatonfőkajár	Anti-clockwise	2025–2026	2	
Brainerd International Raceway	(United States) Brainerd	Clockwise	1989–1991	3	
Brands Hatch	(United Kingdom) West Kingsdown	Clockwise	1993, 1995–2008 (Note: Brands Hatch hosted 2 rounds in 2000.)	16	
Brno Circuit	(Czech Republic) Brno	Clockwise	1993, 1996, 2005–2012, 2018	11	
Bugatti Circuit	(France) Le Mans	Clockwise	1988, 1990	2	
Chang International Circuit	(Thailand) Buriram	Clockwise	2015–2019	5	
Circuit de Barcelona-Catalunya	(Spain) Montmeló	Clockwise	2020–2024	5	
**Circuit de Nevers Magny-Cours** ✔	(France) Magny-Cours	Clockwise	1991, 2003–2026	25	
Circuit de Spa-Francorchamps	(Belgium) Spa	Clockwise	1992	1	
Circuit Paul Ricard	(France) Le Castellet	Clockwise	1989	1	
**Circuit Ricardo Tormo** *	(Spain) Cheste	Anti-clockwise	2000–2010	11	
Circuito de Albacete	(Spain) Albacete	Clockwise	1992–1999	8	
**Circuito de Jerez** ✔	(Spain) Jerez de la Frontera	Clockwise	1990, 2013–2017, 2019–2021, 2023–2025	12	
Circuito de Navarra	(Spain) Los Arcos	Clockwise	2021	1	
Circuito del Jarama	(Spain) San Sebastián de los Reyes	Clockwise	1991–1992	2	
**Circuito do Estoril** ✔	(Portugal) Estoril	Clockwise	1988, 1993, 2020–2022, 2024-2025	7	
Circuito San Juan Villicum	(Argentina) Albardón	Anti-clockwise	2018–2019, 2021–2022	4	
**Cremona Circuit** ✔	(Italy) San Martino del Lago	Anti-clockwise	2024–2026	3	
**Donington Park** ✔	(United Kingdom) Castle Donington	Clockwise	1988–2001, 2007–2009, 2011–2019, 2021–2026 (Note: Donington Park hosted 2 rounds in 1994.)	33	
Hockenheimring	(Germany) Hockenheim	Clockwise	1988–2000	12	
Hungaroring	(Hungary) Mogyoród	Clockwise	1988–1990	3	
Istanbul Park	(Turkey) Tuzla	Anti-clockwise	2013	1	
Johor Circuit	(Malaysia) Pasir Gudang	Clockwise	1992–1993	2	
Kyalami	(South Africa) Midrand	Anti-clockwise	1998–2002, 2009–2010	7	
Lausitzring	(Germany) Klettwitz	Anti-clockwise	2001–2002, 2005–2007, 2016–2017	7	
Lusail International Circuit	(Qatar) Lusail	Clockwise	2005–2009, 2014–2019	11	
Mandalika International Street Circuit	(Indonesia) Mandalika	Clockwise	2021–2023	3	
Manfeild Autocourse	(New Zealand) Feilding	Clockwise	1988–1990, 1992	4	
Miller Motorsports Park	(United States) Grantsville	Anti-clockwise	2008–2012	5	
**Misano World Circuit Marco Simoncelli** ✔	(Italy) Misano Adriatico	Both (Clockwise since 2007)	1991, 1993–2012, 2014–2019, 2021–2026	33	
Moscow Raceway	(Russia) Volokolamsk	Anti-clockwise	2012–2013	2	
Mosport International Raceway	(Canada) Bowmanville	Clockwise	1989–1991	3	
**MotorLand Aragón** ✔	(Spain) Alcañiz	Anti-clockwise	2011–2026 (Note: MotorLand Aragón hosted 2 rounds in 2020.)	17	
Motorsport Arena Oschersleben	(Germany) Oschersleben	Clockwise	2000–2004	5	
Nürburgring	(Germany) Nürburg	Clockwise	1998–1999, 2008–2013	8	
Oran Park Raceway	(Australia) Narellan	Anti-clockwise	1988–1989	2	
**Phillip Island Grand Prix Circuit** ✔	(Australia) Ventnor	Anti-clockwise	1990–1992, 1994–2020, 2022–2026	35	
Salzburgring	(Austria) Plainfeld	Clockwise	1995	1	
Sentul International Circuit	(Indonesia) Sentul	Clockwise	1994–1997	4	
Sepang International Circuit	(Malaysia) Sepang	Clockwise	2014–2016	3	
Shah Alam Circuit	(Malaysia) Shah Alam	Clockwise	1990–1991	2	
**Shanghai International Circuit** *	(China) Jiading	Clockwise	2027	0	
Silverstone Circuit	(United Kingdom) Silverstone	Clockwise	2002–2007, 2010–2013	10	
Sportsland Sugo	(Japan) Murata	Clockwise	1988–2003	16	
**The Bend Motorsport Park** *	(Australia) Tailem Bend	Clockwise	2028	0	
**TT Circuit Assen** ✔	(Netherlands) Assen	Clockwise	1992–2019, 2021–2026	34	
WeatherTech Raceway Laguna Seca	(United States) Monterey	Anti-clockwise	1995–2004, 2013–2019	17	

== See also ==
- List of motor racing venues by capacity
