= Mevlud Meladze =

Motorsports promoter and road safety activist from Georgia

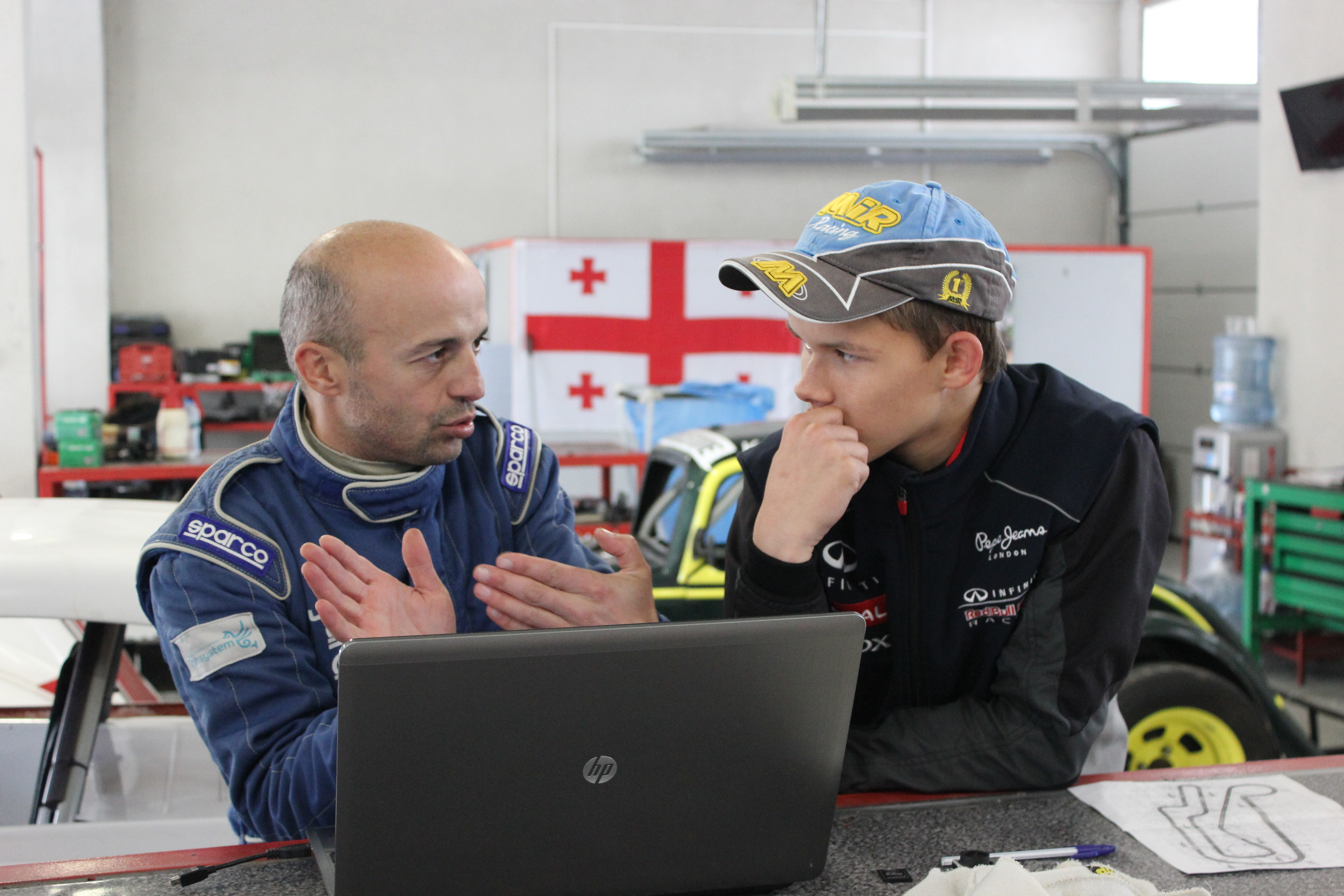
- Mevlud Meladze working with amateur driver Roman Lebedev

Vice-President of Georgian Automobile Sport Federation
- Incumbent
- Assumed office 17 July 2014
- Preceded by: Mamuka Mikeashvili

Personal details
- Born: 5 September 1972 (age 54) Tbilisi, Georgia
- Spouse: Salome Gvelesiani (2010–present)
- Children: Luca, Licka, Maximilian
- Parent(s): Vaja Meladze; Siranush Bartaia
- Education: Tbilisi State University

Mevlud Meladze
Medal record

Representing Georgia

Men's Combat Sambo

World Championships
Silver medal – second place	1991 Chambéry	+52 kg

European Championships
Gold medal – first place	1991 Tourin	+52 kg

Mevlud Meladze (Georgian: მევლუდ მელაძე) (born 5 September 1972) is Georgia's best known motorsports promoter and road safety activist, the founder and vice-president of the Georgian Automobile Sport Federation, a non-profit association that represents the interests of motoring organizations and car users in Georgia. A former Sambo practitioner, he entered the racing career in 2001 and became the Formula Alfa Champion of Georgia in 2014.

He retired from competitive sambo in 1994 after a remarkable progress where he won gold medal in European tournament and became a second-prize winner of the World Championship.

Since 2006, he worked as a defensive driving instructor and advisor for numerous organizations, including International Red Cross, European Union Monitoring Mission in Georgia, Swiss Embassy, Georgian Ministry of Internal Affairs and its Police Academy.

As a public figure, Meladze identified his major achievements as a foundation of professional motorsports in Georgia and a number of successful road safety campaigns.

== Family and early life ==
His father, Vaja Meladze, also known by the pen name Chordeli, is a known Georgian writer and editor of Amer-Imeri literary magazine. His mother, Siranush Bartaia, is a school-teacher and philologist. As a youth, he studied art under one of the city's leading painters Tite Shekiladze (Georgian: ტიტე შეყილაძე) and improved himself a lot.

In the age of 10, being inspired by his father, Meladze began sambo in “Tuno” sportsclub, where Shota Khabareli and other famous Georgian fighters were practised.

When studying secondary school he also became interested in Aeromodelling and RC cars building. From 1989 till 1993 he was attended Tbilisi State University, where he graduated with a degree in economics.

== Martial arts career ==
Meladze was qualified for the professional competitions for the first time in 1983. In 1988 he fought at the Soviet Spartakiad. A year after he became second in the Championship of Soviet Union and secured a spot on the Georgian National team, together with the top sambo fighters Jondo Muzashvili and Archil Chokheli (later two-times World Champion and a military officer who was killed defending five hostages along the border with Russia in 2012). He continued his success by winning a gold medal at the 1991 European Sambo Cup, becoming the first national champion of Europe after restore of independence of Georgia. Later he won a bronze medal twice in the Cup of Europe (1992, 1993) and a silver one in the World championship.

== Racing championships and accomplishments ==
In 2001 Meladze started car racing. Two years he spent competing with amateurs before receiving a professional license. He won his first national championship in 2002 in a Touring Cars category.

=== Rally ===
- Winner of a stage of the 2005 European Rally Cup East
- Nemiroff Yalta Rally - 2nd in group A6, 2006th European Rally Cup East
- Prime Yalta Rally - 2nd in group A6, 2007 European Rally Cup East
- Participant of the Rally America in group 2-Wheel Drive - National
- 2014 Rally America - 8th in group 2-Wheel Drive - National

=== Circuit Racing ===
- Winner of 2002, 2008, 2009, 2010 National Championships (touring cars)
- Winner of 2011 Black Sea Cup (touring cars)
- Winner of the 2014 Formula Alfa Championship of Georgia
- Winner of the 2015 Formula Alfa Championship of Georgia
- Winner of the 2017 USTCC United States Touring Car Championship class ST with his teammate George Kibilov

=== Drifting ===
- Winner of 2017 Georgian Drift Championship
- 2018 went his first international drifting competition and got top 32 battle with Elias Hountondji
- Competed on Drift Masters 2019. Drift Masters European Championship drivers list VIDEO1 VIDEO2 VIDEO3
- Represented Georgia as team captain on FIA motorsport games in Rome, and got top 16 drift battles, where his opponent was Portugues Diogo Manuel Dias Correia but because of engine failure he could not manage to get on start line VIDEO
- Georgian Drift Championship standings - 2017-1; 2018-2; 2020-2; 2021-3; 2023 -1;
- Winner of King of Drift 2022 link
- Champion of Georgia 2023 link standings
- Winner of King of Drift 2023 link
- Winner of King of Drift 2024 link

=== Slalom ===
- Mevlud Meladze's first attempt in motorsport was amateur Auto Slalom in 1999
- in 2005 on behalf of Georgian Automobilists Club he started organizing Auto Slalom tournaments in Georgia
- 2017 auto slalom was stopped for a while because of problems of finding the places for the event
- 2022 Auto slalom was returned back when Mevlud Meladze built his own racing track Lilo Arena
- At the end of the year 2022 he won Georgian slalom championship and went to the FIA Motorsport Games in France on the 27–30 October as a driver with his teammate Irina Onashvili and won bronze medal

== Motorsports and Road Safety Initiatives ==
In 2005 Meladze established GAC (Georgian Automobilists Club) and became its chief executive. He made arrangements and organized the 2005 FIA European Rally Cup (South) in Georgia. The club has promoted a number of amateur motorsports events, each one as a kind of socially significant initiative like “Drink responsibly”, “Follow the road signs”, “Think before you drive”, etc. In 2006 he launched a campaign for a mandatory seat belt use. At the end of 2010, after his speech to the Parliament, the law has been adopted. Since 2007 influential Georgian newspaper “Tbiliselebi” includes his column dedicated to the road safety. For 2012-2013 Meladze hosted the morning TV show at Georgian Channel 1. Since 2014 he is a resident expert at the top-rated Georgian channel Rustavi-2, “The Other Midday” show.

In 2008 Meladze was elected as president of the Georgian Automobile Federation, the national sporting authority recognised by the FIA. On the same year he developed and successfully executed a special training cours for Georgian Ministry of Internal Affairs staff, then in 2012 - for the Police Academy; the latter has been terminated after the 2012 parliamentary election. While heading the Federation, Meladze promoted and supported several auto mobility programs, including the Caucasus Fuel Economy Initiative (CFEI).

Since 2006, he has realised a number of learning programs for International Red Cross, European Union Monitoring Mission to Georgia, Swiss Embassy and other international organizations. In 2008 he began a crusade against demolition of the old Rustavi race circuit and finally found an investor for its total reconstruction. After putting the new race track into service, Meladze created the first professional racing team in Georgia and became one of its drivers.

In the end of 2014 season he initiated the first-ever external event of the Georgian Championship at the Istanbul F1 Park in Turkey and won the race at the wheel of Formula Alfa competing against 14 rivals.

In 2019, Mevlud Meladze began constructing a car racing arena for various motorsport disciplines, with a particular focus on drifting. He named the facility Lilo Arena www.liloarena.com As soon as the tarmac was laid, Mevlud Meladze launched a drifting series called King of Drift www.kingofdrift.com The series itself had originally been created by him in 2008. The first driver to be crowned 'King of Drift' was Zviad Adeishvili VIDEO on facebook known by the nickname Potela, in 2009 the title went to the well-known street racer and drifter Giorgi Tevzadze, also known as Tevzi from his youtube video YOUTUBE VIDEO.

== Other activities ==
In May 2014 Meladze as the vice-president of national motorsport federation (GASF) joined to the anti-drug campaign launched by the Ministry of Internal Affairs and gathered youngsters at the Rustavi Motorpark to help them get involved into breathtaking motorsport world.
