= 2019 FIA Motorsport Games Drifting Cup =

Motorsport event

Race details
Date	1-2 November
Official name	FIA Motorsport Games Drifting Cup
Location	Campagnano di Roma, Italy
Course	Permanent circuit 4.085 km (2.538 mi)
- Qualifying

Pole
Driver	(Portugal) Diogo Correia	Team Portugal
- Medalists
1st place, gold medalist(s)	(Ukraine) Dmitriy Illyuk	Team Ukraine
2nd place, silver medalist(s)	(Czech Republic) Michal Reichert	Team Czech Republic
3rd place, bronze medalist(s)	(Russia) Ilya Fedorov	Team Russia

The FIA Motorsport Games Drifting Cup was the first FIA Motorsport Games Drifting Cup, to be held at ACI Vallelunga Circuit, Italy on 1 November to 2 November 2019. The event was part of the 2019 FIA Motorsport Games.

Each competitor had two solo runs, with the higher-scoring run counting towards a final qualifying classification. Top-16 drivers were eligible to contest the Final Battle stage. Drivers were seeded according to their qualifying results, with the best-scoring qualifier going up against the 16th-placed competitor, second facing 15th, etc. In qualifying, judges scored competitors using four criteria – line, angle, style and speed – up to a maximum total of 100 points. In the Final Battle phase, each judge scored the round individually with a majority decision between a three-person panel determining the winner.

== Entry list ==
Team	Car	No.	Drivers
Team Netherlands	Nissan Skyline R33	2	Rick Van Goethem
Team Hungary	BMW M3 E92	8	Zoltán Szántó
Team Russia	Nissan Silvia S14	9	Ilya Fedorov
Team Portugal	BMW M3 E92	11	Diogo Manuel Dias Correia
(Georgia (country)) Team Georgia	BMW E36	13	Mevlud Meladze
Team Italy	Toyota GT 86	19	Federico Sceriffo
Team Ukraine	Nissan 200SX	20	Dmitriy Illyuk
Team Latvia	BMW M3 E46	21	Edmunds Berzins
Team Estonia	BMW E36	28	Ao Vaida
Team Finland	BMW M3 E92	38	Juha Pöytälaakso
Team Romania	BMW M1 Coupé	55	Vlad Andrei Stanescu
Team Sweden	Subaru BRZ	68	Christian Erlandsson
Team Norway	Nissan 200SX	69	Odd-Helge Helstad
Team Kuwait	Nissan 240SX	71	Ali Makhseed
Team France	BMW M3 E93	83	Benjamin Boulbes
Team Greece	Toyota AE 86	86	Stavros Grillis
Team Switzerland	BMW M2 Coupé Competition	91	Yves Meyer
Team Lithuania	BMW M3 E46	93	Benediktas Čirba
Team Belarus	Nissan 200SX	99	Dzmitry Nahula
Team Denmark	Nissan Silvia S15	121	Dennis Hansen
Team Austria	BMW M3 E46	233	Daniel "Brandy" Brandner
Team Slovakia	BMW E36	416	János "Dianos" Onódi
Team Czech Republic	BMW M3 E92	850	Michal Reichert
Team Malta	Toyota Supra	898	Kane Pisani

== Results ==
=== Qualification ===
Pos.	No.	Driver name	Run 1					Run 2				
Pos.	No.	Driver name	Line	Angle	Commitment	Fluidity	Total	Line	Angle	Commitment	Fluidity	Total
1	11	(Portugal) Diogo Correia	12	20	9	6	47	32	30	14	13	89
2	93	(Lithuania) Benediktas Čirba	31	31	13	11	86	21	22	12	9	64
3	38	(Finland) Juha Pöytälaakso	25	31	13	12	81	23	23	14	11	71
4	9	(Russia) Ilya Fedorov	0	0	0	0	0	32	27	10	10	79
5	69	(Norway) Odd-Helge Helstad	0	0	0	0	0	18	28	12	10	68
6	20	(Ukraine) Dmitriy Illyuk	17	26	13	10	66	0	0	0	0	0
7	17	(Italy) Federico Sceriffo	20	22	11	9	62	0	0	0	0	0
8	91	(Switzerland) Yves Meyer	12	21	9	4	46	17	24	12	8	61
9	850	(Czech Republic) Michal Reichert	18	27	8	8	61	0	0	0	0	0
10	21	(Latvia) Edmunds Berzins	19	23	10	8	60	0	0	0	0	0
11	28	(Estonia) Ao Vaida	9	24	10	9	52	10	18	10	8	46
12	233	(Austria) Daniel Brandner	12	19	6	8	45	13	24	6	9	52
13	8	(Hungary) Zoltán Szántó	0	0	0	0	0	15	24	5	7	51
14	71	(Kuwait) Ali Makhseed	7	20	7	6	40	13	23	7	7	50
15	99	(Belarus) Dzmitry Nahula	11	23	6	3	43	0	0	0	0	0
16	13	(Georgia (country)) Mevlud Meladze	9	19	6	6	40	0	0	0	0	0
17	55	(Romania) Vlad Andrei Stanescu	0	0	0	0	0	0	0	0	0	0
18	68	(Sweden) Christian Erlandsson	0	0	0	0	0	0	0	0	0	0
19	83	(France) Benjamin Boulbes	0	0	0	0	0	0	0	0	0	0
20	121	(Denmark) Dennis Hansen	0	0	0	0	0	0	0	0	0	0
21	416	(Slovakia) János Onódi	0	0	0	0	0	0	0	0	0	0
22	898	(Malta) Kane Pisani	0	0	0	0	0	0	0	0	0	0

=== Battle Tournament (Final) ===
Pos.	No.	Driver name
1st place, gold medalist(s)	20	(Ukraine) Dmitriy Illyuk
2nd place, silver medalist(s)	850	(Czech Republic) Michal Reichert
3rd place, bronze medalist(s)	9	(Russia) Ilya Fedorov
4	17	(Italy) Federico Sceriffo
5	11	(Portugal) Diogo Correia
6	38	(Finland) Juha Pöytälaakso
7	69	(Norway) Odd-Helge Helstad
8	99	(Belarus) Dzmitry Nahula
9	93	(Lithuania) Benediktas Čirba
10	91	(Switzerland) Yves Meyer
11	21	(Latvia) Edmunds Berzins
12	28	(Estonia) Ao Vaida
13	233	(Austria) Daniel Brandner
14	8	(Hungary) Zoltán Szántó
15	71	(Kuwait) Ali Makhseed
16	13	(Georgia (country)) Mevlud Meladze
