= List of FIA World Touring Car Championship circuits =

This is a list of circuits which have hosted a round of the FIA World Touring Car Championship. This includes from the inaugural year of 1987, the WTCC held between 2005 and 2017 and the WTCR which held between 2018 and 2022.

== List ==
Circuit	Location	Seasons	Total rounds	Map
Adria International Raceway	Adria, Italy	2021	1	
Algarve International Circuit	Portimão, Portugal	2010, 2012	2	
Anderstorp Raceway	Anderstorp, Sweden	2007	1	
Anneau du Rhin	Biltzheim, France	2022	1	
Autodrom Most	Most, Czech Republic	2021	1	
Autodromo Enzo e Dino Ferrari	Imola, Italy	2005, 2008–2009	3	
Autódromo Fernanda Pires da Silva	Estoril, Portugal	2008, 2021	2	
Autódromo Internacional de Curitiba	Pinhais, Brazil	2006–2012	7	
Autódromo Miguel E. Abed	Amozoc de Mota, Mexico	2005–2006, 2008–2009	4	
Autodromo Nazionale Monza	Monza, Italy	1987, 2005–2008, 2010–2013, 2017	10	
Autódromo Termas de Río Hondo	Termas de Río Hondo, Argentina	2013–2017	5	
Automotodrom Brno	Brno, Czech Republic	1987, 2006–2011	7	
Automotodróm Slovakia Ring	Orechová Potôň, Slovakia	2012–2016, 2018–2020	8	
Bahrain International Circuit	Sakhir, Bahrain	2022	1	
Brands Hatch	Fawkham, United Kingdom	2006–2010	5	
Calder Park Raceway	Keilor, Australia	1987	1	
Chang International Circuit	Buriram, Thailand	2015	1	
Circuit de Nevers Magny-Cours	Magny-Cours, France	2005–2006	2	
Circuit de Pau-Ville	Pau, France	2007–2009, 2022	4	
Circuit de Spa-Francorchamps	Stavelot, Belgium	1987, 2005, 2014	3	
Circuit International Automobile Moulay El Hassan	Marrakesh, Morocco	2009–2010, 2012–2019	10	
Circuit Pau-Arnos	Arnos, France	2021	1	
Circuit Paul Ricard	Le Castellet, France	2014–2016	3	
Circuit Ricardo Tormo	Cheste, Spain	2005–2012	8	
Circuit Zandvoort	Zandvoort, Netherlands	2007, 2018–2019	3	
Circuit Zolder	Heusden-Zolder, Belgium	2010–2011, 2020	3	
Circuito da Boavista	Porto, Portugal	2007, 2009, 2011, 2013	4	
Circuito del Jarama	Madrid, Spain	1987	1	
Circuito Internacional de Vila Real	Vila Real, Portugal	2015–2019, 2022	6	
Dijon-Prenois	Dijon, France	1987	1	
Donington Park	Castle Donington, United Kingdom	2011	1	
Fuji Speedway	Oyama, Japan	1987	1	
Goldenport Park Circuit	Beijing, China	2014	1	
Guia Circuit	Macau	2005–2014, 2017–2019	13	
Hungaroring	Mogyoród, Hungary	2011–2022	12	
Istanbul Park	Istanbul, Turkey	2005–2006	2	
Jeddah Corniche Circuit	Jeddah, Saudi Arabia	2022	1	
Losail International Circuit	Lusail, Qatar	2015–2017	3	
Moscow Raceway	Volokolamsk, Russia	2013–2016	4	
MotorLand Aragón	Alcañiz, Spain	2020–2022 (2 in 2020)	4	
Motorsport Arena Oschersleben	Oschersleben, Germany	2005–2011	7	
Mount Panorama Circuit	Bathurst, Australia	1987	1	
Ningbo International Circuit	Ningbo, China	2017–2019	3	
Nürburgring GP-Strecke	(West Germany) Nürburg, Germany	1987	1	
Nürburgring Nordschleife	Nürburg, Germany	2015–2021	7	
Okayama International Circuit	Mimasaka, Japan	2008–2010	3	
Salzburgring	Salzburg, Austria	2012–2014	3	
Sepang International Circuit	Sepang, Malaysia	2019	1	
Shanghai International Circuit	Jiading, Shanghai, China	2012–2016	5	
Shanghai Tianma Circuit	Shanghai, China	2011	1	
Silverstone Circuit	Silverstone, United Kingdom	1987, 2005	2	
Sochi Autodrom	Sirius, Russia	2021	1	
Sonoma Raceway	Sonoma, United States	2012–2013	2	
Suzuka International Racing Course	Suzuka, Japan	2011–2014, 2018–2019	6	
Twin Ring Motegi	Motegi, Japan	2015–2017	3	
Vallelunga Circuit	Campagnano di Roma, Italy	2022	1	
Wellington Street Circuit	Wellington, New Zealand	1987	1	
Wuhan Street Circuit	Wuhan, China	2018	1	

== See also ==
- World Touring Car Championship
- Touring car racing
