= Istanbul Park =

Race track in Istanbul, Turkey

TOSFED İstanbul Park
- Grand Prix Circuit (2005–present)
- Location: Tuzla, Istanbul, Turkey
- Coordinates: 40°57′6″N 29°24′18″E
- Capacity: 125,000
- FIA Grade: 1 (Grand Prix) (Note: TOSFED İstanbul Park's Grade 1 license expired 12 November 2023 and Grade 3 license expired 16 May 2025. It still holds a grade 6R license for rallycross, however since it is contracted to appear on the 2027 F1 Calendar, at least the Grade 1 license should be renewed.); 3 (Intermediate); 6R (Rallycross)
- Owner: Vakıflar Genel Müdürlüğü (August 2005–present)
- Operator: Turkish Automobile Sports Federation (June 2025–present); Can Bilim Eğitim Kurumları A.Ş. (April 2024–December 2024); Intercity (October 2012–March 2024); Bernie Ecclestone (April 2007–September 2012); FİYAŞ (August 2005–March 2007)
- Broke ground: 23 September 2003; 23 years ago
- Opened: 19 August 2005; 21 years ago
- Architect: Hermann Tilke
- Former names: İstanbul Park (August 2005–September 2012, April 2024–May 2025); Intercity İstanbul Park (October 2012–March 2024)
- Major events: Future: Formula One; Turkish Grand Prix (2005–2011, 2020–2021, 2027–2031); Former: Grand Prix motorcycle racing Turkish motorcycle Grand Prix (2005–2007); WTCC Race of Turkey (2005–2006); Le Mans Series; 1000 km Istanbul (2005–2006); FIA World Rallycross Championship; World RX of Turkey (2014–2015, 2024–2025); FIA European RX (2025); World SBK (2013); DTM (2005); FIA GT (2005); International GT Open (2006); World Series by Renault (2006); European Truck Racing Championship (2012)
- Website: https://tosfedistanbulpark.com/

Grand Prix Circuit (2005–present)
- Length: 5.338 km (3.317 mi)
- Turns: 14
- Race lap record: 1:24.770 ( (Colombia) Juan Pablo Montoya, McLaren MP4-20, 2005, F1)

Intermediate Circuit (2005–present)
- Length: 3.925 km (2.439 mi)
- Turns: 13

Rallycross Circuit (2014–present)
- Length: 1.346 km (0.836 mi)
- Turns: 14

Istanbul Park (Turkish: İstanbul Park), also known as the TOSFED İstanbul Park for marketing purposes, is a motor sports race track in the Tuzla district of Istanbul, Turkey. Designed by Hermann Tilke, it opened on 19–21 August 2005. It has been called "the best race track in the world" by former Formula One Chief Executive Bernie Ecclestone, who held the managing rights of the circuit between 2007 and 2011.

== Description ==
The venue of the Turkish Grand Prix is located in the crossing of boundaries of Pendik and Tuzla districts on the Asian side of Istanbul, close to the junction of Kurtköy on the north side of the O–4 motorway, linking Istanbul to Ankara; and close to the junction of Istanbul Park on the south side of the O–7 motorway. It is near Sabiha Gökçen International Airport and is surrounded by forests and fields.

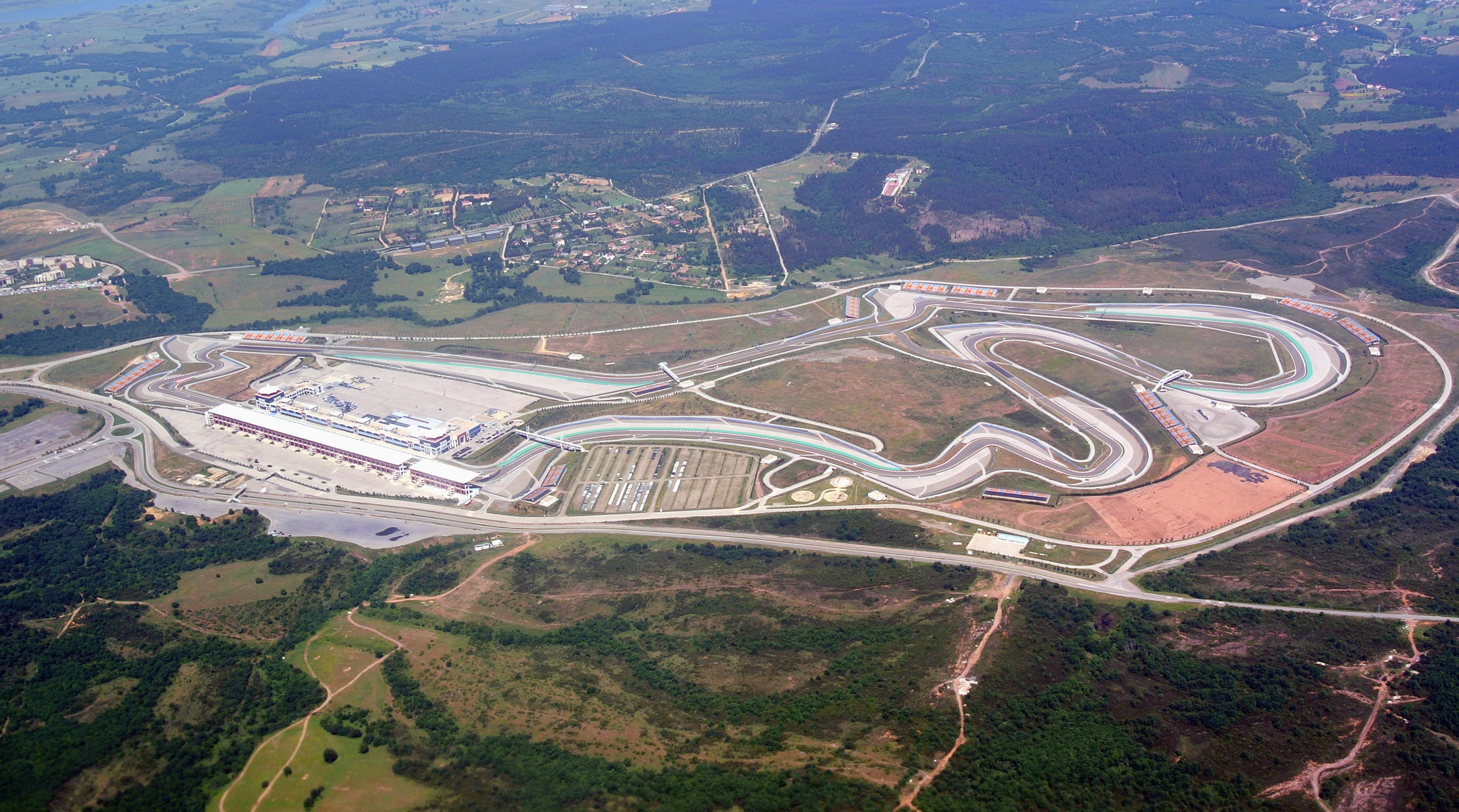
Aerial view of Istanbul Park

Afer Ecclestone, The circuit was then managed by the Turkish company Intercity between October 2012 to March 2024. A tender was held in April 2024 for a new operator with Can Bilim Eğitim A.Ş. winning the rights, however its tender rights was cancelled in December 2024 by an administrative court. In June 2025, it was announced that the operating rights of this circuit was given to Turkish Automobile Sports Federation for at least 10 years, and the name was changed as TOSFED İstanbul Park.

The Istanbul Park racing circuit will be one of only nine circuits running anticlockwise in the 2027 Formula One season, the others being the Jeddah Corniche Circuit (used for the Saudi Arabian Grand Prix), the Miami International Autodrome (used for the Miami Grand Prix), the Baku City Circuit (used for the Azerbaijan Grand Prix), the Marina Bay Street Circuit (used for the Singapore Grand Prix), Circuit of the Americas (used for the United States Grand Prix), the Interlagos Circuit (used for the São Paulo Grand Prix), the Las Vegas Strip Circuit (used for the Las Vegas Grand Prix), and the Yas Marina Circuit (used for the Abu Dhabi Grand Prix). This unusual anti-clockwise layout leads to increased strain on the other side of the driver's neck than they would experience at most other circuits, especially through the long high-speed left-hander at turn 8.

The circuit is 5.338 km (3.317 mi) long, with an average width of 15 m (16 yd) ranging from 14 to 21.5 m (15.3 to 23.5 yd), and covers over 2.215×10^{6} m^{2} (547 acres). With a total of 14 corners, the sharpest with a radius of merely 15 m (16 yd), the circuit runs over four different ground levels with a start/finish straight over 650 m (710 yd) in length.

The track can hold about 125,000 spectators. The main grandstand has a seating capacity of 25,000 spectators, with natural ground stands and temporary stands allowing for around 100,000 more. The paddock buildings are two-level structures; the ground floor reserved for racing teams, the upper floor serving as hospitality areas with 5,000 seats. At each end of the paddock, there are two 7-story VIP towers.

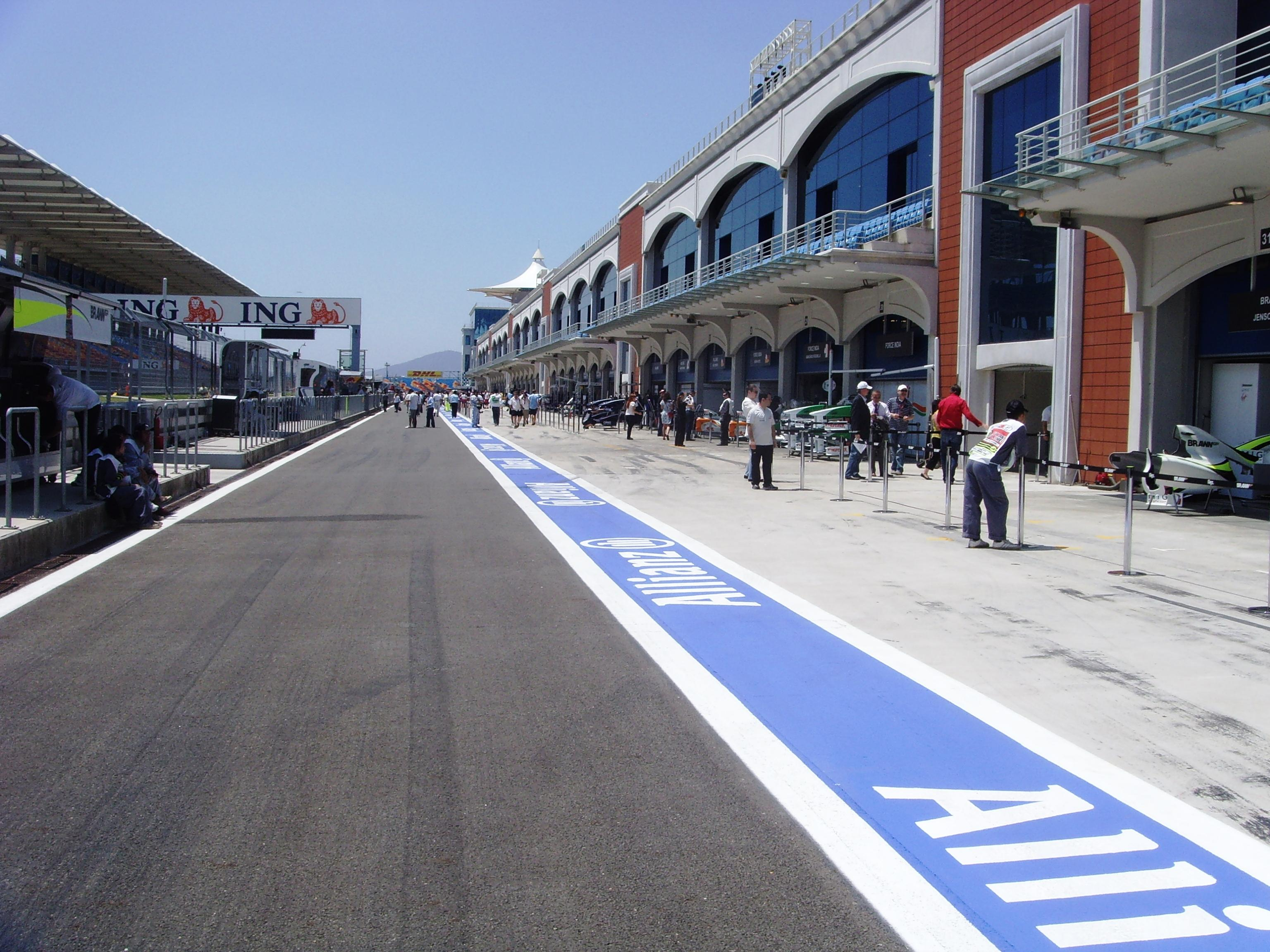
A view of the pit lane

Turn 8 (nicknamed "Diabolica" by some in reference to Monza's Curva Parabolica) particularly caught the imagination. The corner is a fast, sweeping corner with four apexes, similar to one of the multi-apex sections of the old Nürburgring. Spectators and drivers alike raved about Turn 8, comparing it to legendary corners such as Eau Rouge and 130R. The corner eventually became the basis of some of Tilke's newer track turns, such as turns 17 and 18 at the Circuit of the Americas, turn 3 at the Sochi Autodrom, and Buddh International Circuit's turns 10 to 11. The high loads exerted through this corner contribute to the circuit's reputation for rapid tyre wear.

Another notable corner is Turn 1, a sharp downhill left-hander immediately after the front straight. This corner has been nicknamed by some as the "Turkish Corkscrew" in reference to the famous Corkscrew at WeatherTech Raceway Laguna Seca. Both the 2006 F1 and MotoGP races at the circuit featured multiple incidents at this corner. A third noteworthy area is the uphill kink in the middle of the back straight; due to its similarity to Eau Rouge, it has been jokingly referred to as "Faux Rouge".

The circuit is not, however, without its critics. After qualifying, Jenson Button claimed that the track was getting bumpier as the weekend went on, particularly at Turn 8, which was what caused so many drivers to spin off. This harks back to another circuit designed by Hermann Tilke, Shanghai International Circuit, which is said to be sinking in places because it was built on the site of a former swamp. Jarno Trulli was notable for his lukewarm feeling towards the circuit, saying that he felt the circuit was easy to learn, and that good performance was down more to the car than the driver.

== Major motorsport events ==
=== Formula One ===
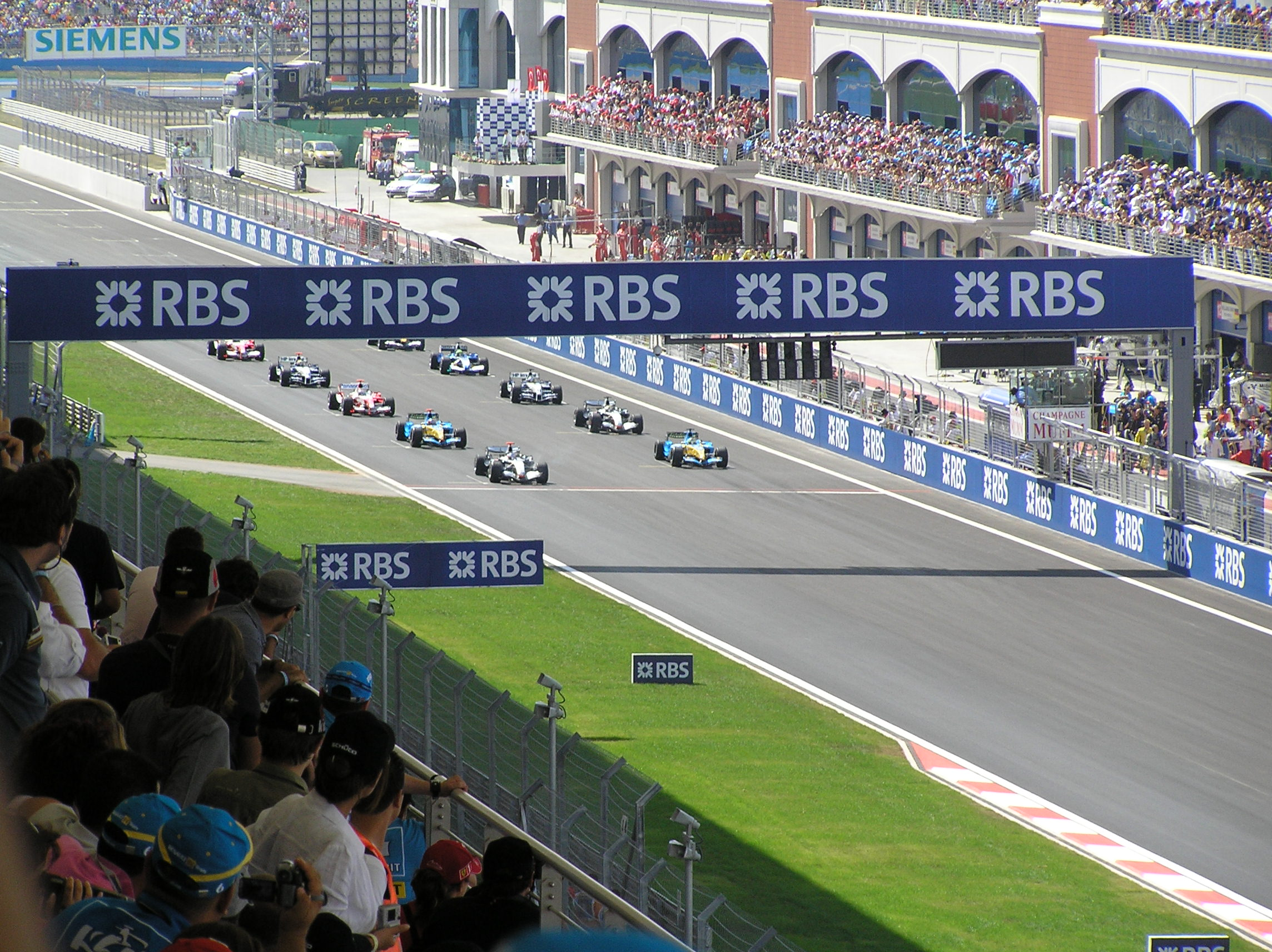
Start of the 2005 Turkish Grand Prix, the first Formula One race at Istanbul Park.

The first Grand Prix of Turkey took place in 2005. Due to financial disagreement, the Turkish Grand Prix discontinued after 2011, despite earlier reports that the event would take place until at least 2021. Felipe Massa has an affinity with this circuit, with the Brazilian winning three of the nine Grands Prix held at Istanbul Park with Lewis Hamilton winning two and Sebastian Vettel, Jenson Button, Kimi Räikkönen and Valtteri Bottas having won one race each.

Istanbul Park returned for the 2020 Formula One World Championship, after a nine-year absence.

Istanbul Park was due to replace the cancelled Canadian Grand Prix for the 2021 Formula One World Championship. Then it was postponed indefinitely due to COVID-19 travel restrictions imposed on the country by the UK government and was replaced by the Styrian Grand Prix. It was later re-added to the 2021 calendar in place of the cancelled Singapore Grand Prix.

The Turkish Grand Prix is due to return to Istanbul Park from 2027.

=== GP2 ===
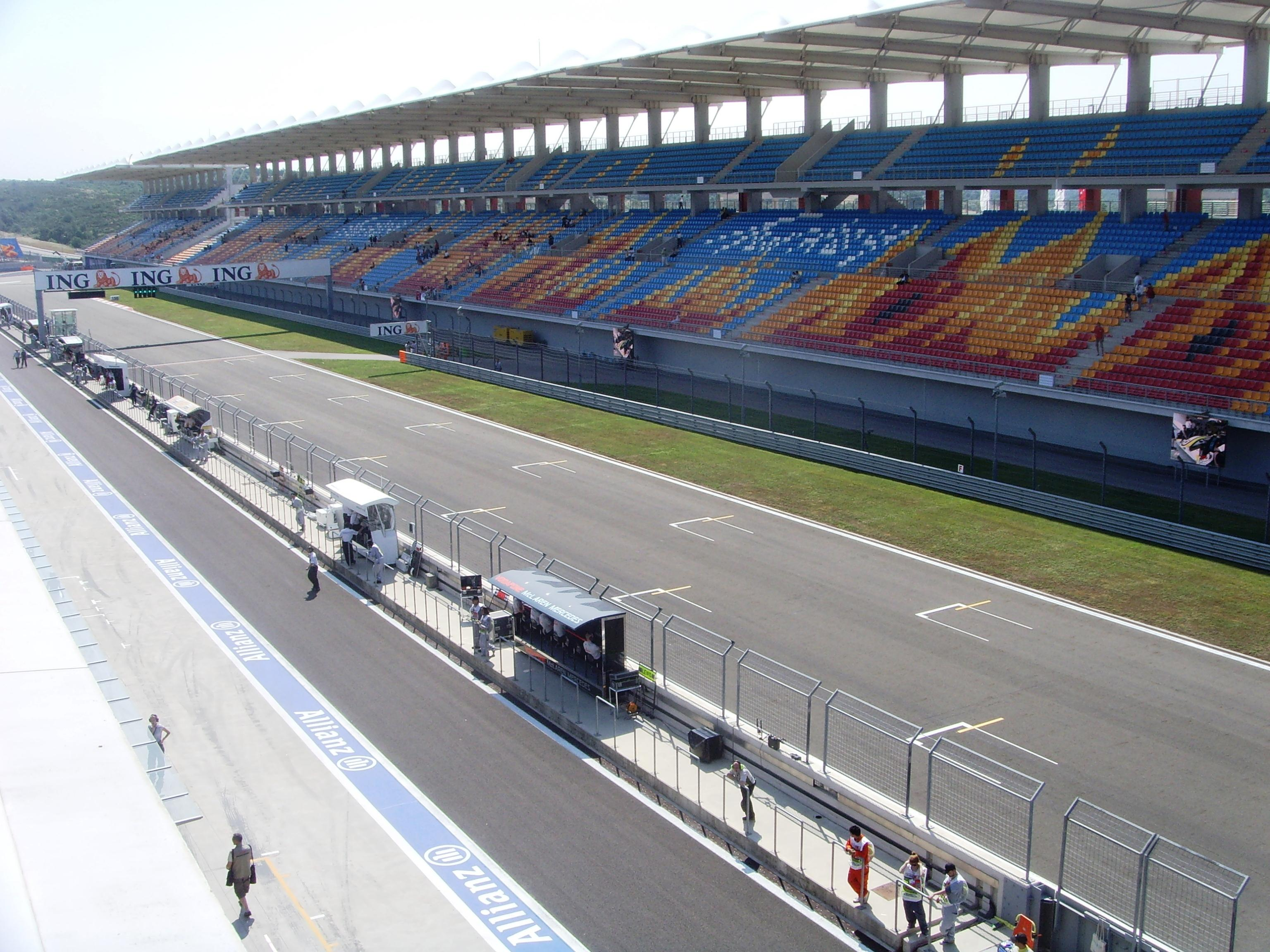
A view of the main grandstand

In 2006, the winner of the GP2 race was Nelson Piquet Jr., however the real battle was with Lewis Hamilton who, at the beginning of the race, spun off and dropped right down the field from 2nd to 16th. However he raced his way back through the pack with some spectacular overtaking moves to finish in second.

Fifteen racers completed the race in 2009 while eleven drivers were not classified. The winner was Russian Vitaly Petrov of Barwa Addax, who moved up to second place in the championship table with 29 points ahead of Jérôme d'Ambrosio having 18 points. Petrov's teammate Romain Grosjean, who retired from the race, was leading the championship with 31 points. The Italians Luca Filippi of Super Nova Racing and Davide Valsecchi of Durango finished second and third in the race.

=== MotoGP ===
MotoGP raced at Istanbul Park for three years between 2005 and 2007. Marco Melandri won the races in 2005 and 2006 with the 2007 race being won by Casey Stoner. After the venue was taken over by now ex-Formula One chief executive Bernie Ecclestone in 2007, the venue was dropped from the 2008 calendar.

=== Other motorsport events ===
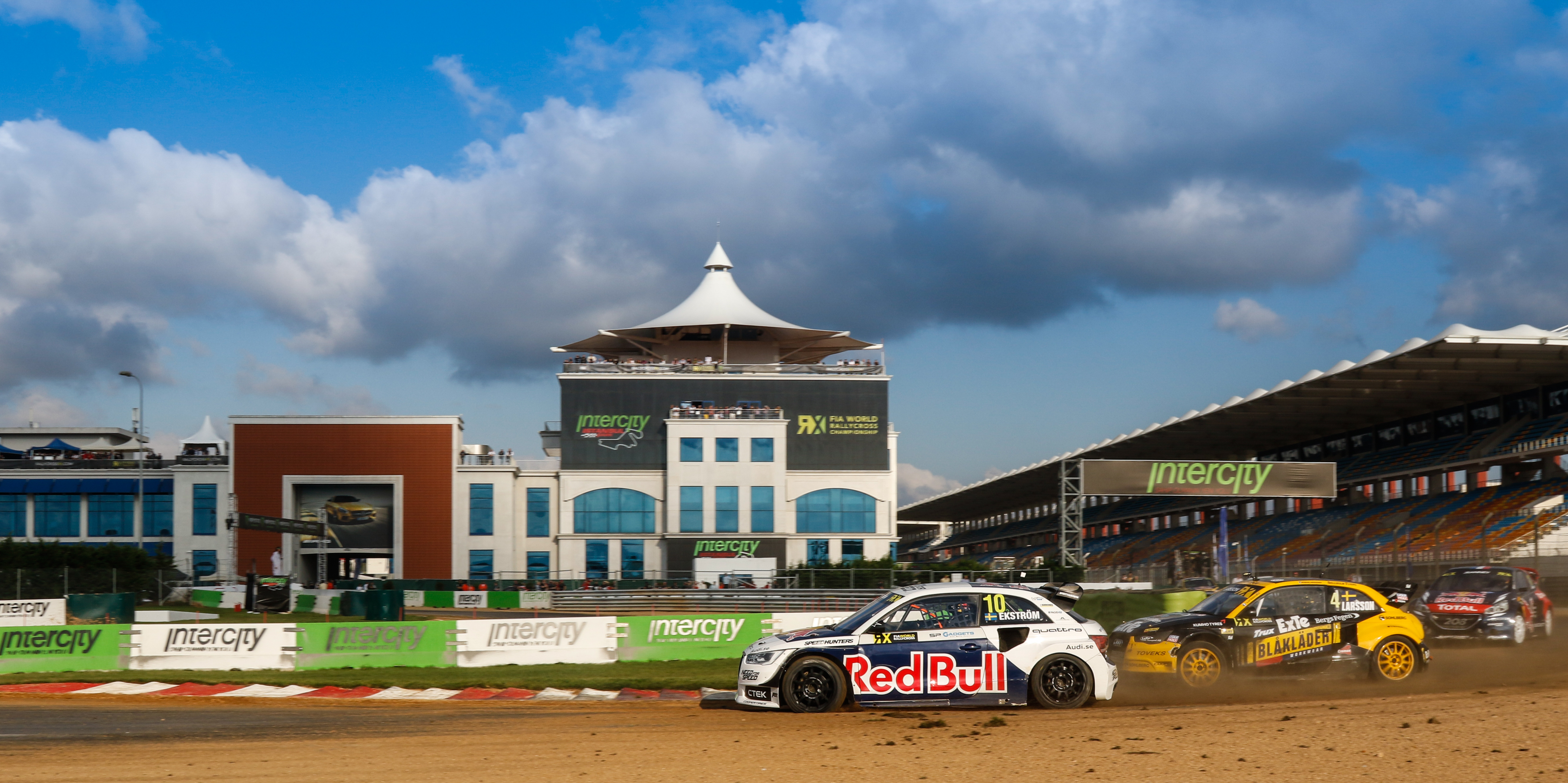
2015 World RX of Turkey race in Istanbul Park

The first leg of the 2012 FIA European Truck Racing Championship was held on 13 May 2012 at Istanbul Park. The Superbike World Championship raced at the track in 2013. The FIA World Rallycross Championship has organized the World RX of Turkey at Istanbul Park in 2014–2015 and 2024–2025, using an area to the outside of turns 12, 13, 14.

Rallycross layout of Istanbul Park, used in 2014–2015 and 2024–2025

=== Events ===
Current

- November: GT Grand Finals/İstanbul

Future

- FIA Formula 2 Championship (2027)
- FIA Formula 3 Championship (2027)
- Formula One
  - Turkish Grand Prix (2005–2011, 2020–2021, 2027–2031)
- Porsche Supercup (2007–2009, 2011, 2027)

Former

- Classic Endurance Racing (2005)
- Deutsche Tourenwagen Masters
  - Istanbul DTM round (2005)
- Eurocup Formula Renault 2.0 (2006)
- Eurocup Mégane Trophy (2006)
- European Truck Racing Championship (2012)
- F3000 International Masters (2006)
- Ferrari Challenge Europe (2014)
- FIA European Rallycross Championship
  - Euro RX of Turkey (2025)
- FIA GT Championship
  - FIA GT Istanbul 2 Hours (2005)
- FIA World Rallycross Championship
  - World RX of Turkey (2014–2015, 2024–2025)
- Formula Alfa Championship (2014–2015)
- Formula-G (2005–2006)
- Formula Renault 3.5 Series (2006)
- GP2 Series (2005–2011)
- GP3 Series (2010–2011)
- Grand Prix motorcycle racing
  - Turkish motorcycle Grand Prix (2005–2007)
- International GT Open (2006)
- Le Mans Series
  - 1000 km Istanbul (2005–2006)
- Porsche Carrera Cup Germany (2005)
- Superbike World Championship
  - Istanbul Park World SBK round (2013)
- World Touring Car Championship
  - FIA WTCC Race of Turkey (2005–2006)

== Lap records ==
The official lap record for the current circuit layout is 1:24.770, set by Juan Pablo Montoya during the 2005 Turkish Grand Prix. While the unofficial all-time track record is 1:22.868, set by Lewis Hamilton in the qualifying of the 2021 Turkish Grand Prix. As of August 2025, the fastest official race lap records at the Istanbul Park are listed as:

Category	Time	Driver	Vehicle	Event
Grand Prix Circuit (2005–present): 5.338 km (3.317 mi)
Formula One	1:24.770	(Colombia) Juan Pablo Montoya	McLaren MP4-20	2005 Turkish Grand Prix
GP2	1:33.482	(United Arab Emirates) Andreas Zuber	Dallara GP2/08	2008 Istanbul GP2 Series round
LMP1	1:41.281	(France) Emmanuel Collard	Pescarolo C60 Hybrid	2006 1000 km of Istanbul
Formula Renault 3.5	1:41.342	(Venezuela) Pastor Maldonado	Dallara T05	2006 Istanbul Formula Renault 3.5 Series round
LMP2	1:43.031	(Portugal) João Barbosa	Radical SR9	2006 1000 km of Istanbul
Formula 3000	1:45.708	(Czech Republic) Tomáš Kostka	Lola B02/50	2006 Istanbul F3000 Masters round
GP3	1:47.227	(Italy) Andrea Caldarelli	Dallara GP3/10	2011 Istanbul GP3 Series round
GT1 (GTS)	1:49.469	(Portugal) Pedro Lamy	Aston Martin DBR9	2006 1000 km of Istanbul
MotoGP	1:52.877	(Spain) Toni Elías	Honda RC211V	2006 Turkish motorcycle Grand Prix
Formula Renault 2.0	1:55.524	(Spain) Dani Clos	Tatuus FR2000	2006 Istanbul Eurocup Formula Renault 2.0 round
GT2	1:55.658	(Germany) Mike Rockenfeller	Porsche 911 (996) GT3-RSR	2005 FIA GT Istanbul 2 Hours
World SBK	1:55.673	(United Kingdom) Tom Sykes	Kawasaki ZX-10R	2013 Istanbul World SBK round
250cc	1:57.595	(Spain) Dani Pedrosa	Honda RS250R	2005 Turkish motorcycle Grand Prix
Porsche Carrera Cup	1:58.612	(Netherlands) Jaap van Lagen	Porsche 911 (997 I) GT3 Cup	2008 Istanbul Porsche Supercup round
World SSP	1:59.157	(United Kingdom) Sam Lowes	Yamaha YZF-R6	2013 Istanbul World SSP round
DTM	2:00.130	(Finland) Mika Hakkinen	Mercedes-Benz AMG C-Class	2005 Istanbul DTM round
Ferrari Challenge	2:00.718	(Italy) Dario Caso	Ferrari 458 Challenge Evo	2014 Istanbul Ferrari Challenge Europe round
TCR Touring Car	2:01.239	(Turkey) Seda Kaçan	Audi RS 3 LMS TCR	2026 6th Turkish Circuit Championship round
Eurocup Mégane Trophy	2:02.560	(Portugal) César Campaniço	Renault Mégane Renault Sport	2006 Istanbul Eurocup Mégane Trophy round
125cc	2:03.825	(Spain) Joan Olivé	Aprilia RS125R	2006 Turkish motorcycle Grand Prix
Super 2000	2:05.771	(Italy) Gabriele Tarquini	Alfa Romeo 156 WTCC	2005 FIA WTCC Race of Turkey
Formula Alfa	2:07.676	(Georgia (country)) Tornike Kiknavelidze	AKKS Formula Alfa	2014 Istanbul Formula Alfa round
Supersport 300	2:13.924	(Turkey) Tolga Uprak	Yamaha YZF-R3	2024 1st Istanbul Turkish Superbike Championship round

== See also ==
- List of Formula One circuits
- List of Grand Prix motorcycle circuits
- List of Superbike World Championship circuits
- List of FIA World Touring Car Championship circuits
- List of European Le Mans Series circuits
- List of World Rallycross Championship events
