= Rustavi International Motorpark =

Motorpark near Tbilisi, Georgia

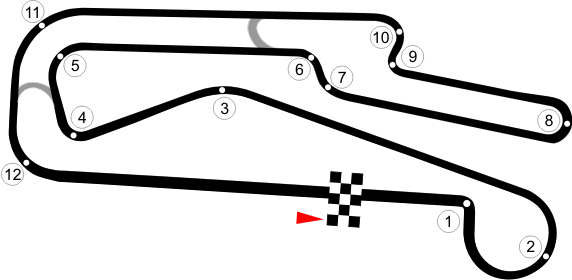
- 'A' Circuit (2012–present)
- Location: Rustavi, Georgia
- Coordinates: 41°34′14″N 44°56′56″E
- Capacity: 7,500
- Owner: Shota Abkhazava (2012–present)
- Opened: 1978; Re-opened: 29 April 2012; 14 years ago
- Closed: 1989
- Major events: Former: TCR International Series (2017); Formula Alfa Championship (2012–2018); Soviet Formula 3 Championship (1979–1987)

'A' Circuit (2012–present)
- Surface: Asphalt
- Length: 4.140 km (2.572 mi)
- Turns: 12
- Banking: Maximum rise 3.16% Maximum fall 2.5% Minimum slope 1.75% Maximum slope 8%
- Race lap record: 1:42.657 ( (Spain) Pepe Oriola, SEAT León TCR, 2017, TCR)

'B' Circuit (2012–present)
- Surface: Asphalt
- Length: 2.140 km (1.330 mi)
- Turns: 6

'C' Circuit (2012–present)
- Surface: Asphalt
- Length: 1.338 km (0.831 mi)
- Turns: 6

Original Road Course (1978–1989)
- Surface: Asphalt
- Length: 4.039 km (2.510 mi)
- Turns: 11

The Rustavi International Motorpark is a motor racing venue located 20 km (12 mi) south-east of Tbilisi, Georgia.

== History ==
Rustavi was the last race track built in the USSR. Opened in 1978, the original Rustavi circuit was 4.039 km (2.510 mi) in length with a width of 18 m (20 yd) at the start-finish straight, 14 m (15 yd) in turns and 14 m (15 yd) in straights. A karting track, automobile cross circuit and motorbike track were also included in the complex, as well as grandstands for 500–800 people. A technical building and hotel were located nearby. The first races took place at the end of 1979. Until 1989 the track hosted eleven USSR Championship events; however, from 1989 until 2009 the track was not maintained and fell into decay. In 2009 the private company Stromos bought the site at a state auction and began redevelopment.

== Reconstruction ==
After being bought by Somos the track was totally rebuilt and has multiple configuration changes. More than 250000 m^{3} of soil have been moved. New permanent concrete grandstand was erected, which would seat 2,000 people comfortably. 28 FIA-standard pit boxes were built with a Tribune 2, restaurant and conference hall upstairs. Race control tower is located at the third floor of the pitbuilding.

A tunnel for heavy trucks was made under the straight between Turn 2 and Turn 3. A pedestrian tunnel was added to connect main grandstand with the paddock. Spectators can get to the newly built Tribune 3 across a bridge with two Svanuri towers.

The track has been equipped with several engineering systems like video surveillance covering the whole track, 14 electronically controlled signaling lights, a fiber-optic network, sound distribution and AMB timekeeping with 5 loops.

The start-finish line has been extended half mile to serve as a dragstrip.

== Safety ==
Rustavi International Motorpark logo

After the reconstruction the raceway satisfies to the FIA Grade 2 safety regulations that allow to host the most of international racing series including GP2. All runoff areas are filled with gravel of special type, but the most critical ones have asphalted surface.

== Events ==
In 2012 the track hostEd events of different types, like 8-staged national Legends car racing, the Formula Alfa championships, drag racing, pairs racing, drifting, karting, motorcycles and club racing. Tickets are priced at 5 GEL (about $3.00) and available at the gate. Major events are covered in local "Channel 1" (Georgian Public Broadcaster). Since July 14, 2012 the local bookmaker "EuropeBet" has given A line on the main race groups of the Georgian Open Championship.

TCR International Series held an inaugural round of 2017 championship at Rustavi International Motorpark. Local driver Davit Kajaia won the first of two races.

== Teams ==
The motorpark is home for several newly established national teams, such as Gulf Racing, Liberty Bank Racing, MIA Force, Team Ajara, VTB Bank, Sports Ministry Team and GPB Team.

== Track specifications ==
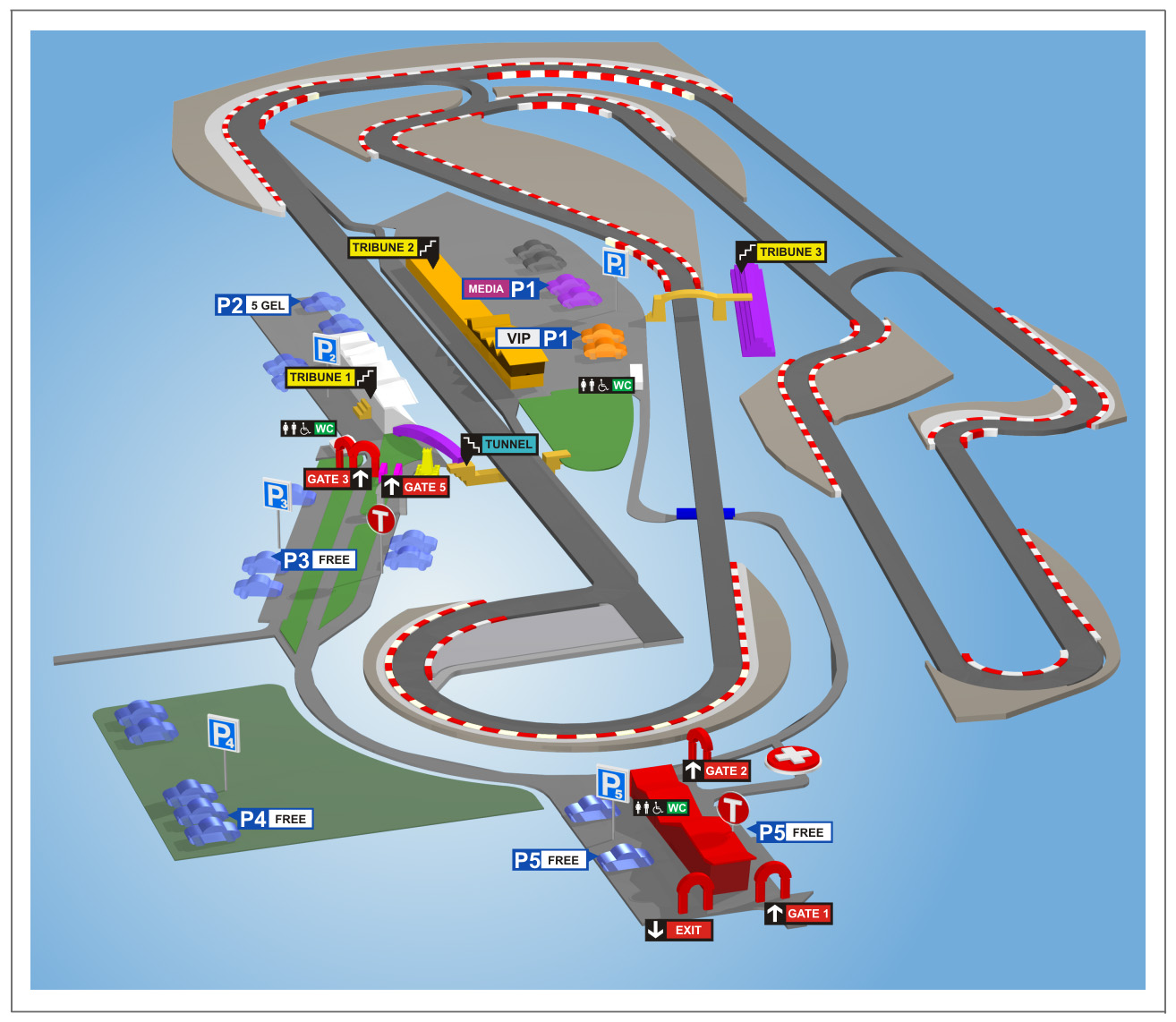
Rustavi International Motorpark

Specification	Size
Length	4.140 km (2.572 mi)
Minimum width	12.5 m (13.7 yd)
Maximum width	21.5 m (23.5 yd)
Length of start-finish straight	667 m (729 yd)
Maximum speed estimate for GP2 car	282 km/h (175 mph)
Direction	Counterclockwise
Maximum longitudinal rise	3.16%
Maximum longitudinal fall	2.5%
Minimum lateral slope	1.75%
Maximum lateral slope	8%
Turns	7 left, 5 right
Grandstand capacity at the first stage of operation	T1 - 2500, T2 - 2000, T3 - 3000
Number of pits	28
Size of pit garage	6 m × 14 m (20 ft × 46 ft)

== Layouts ==
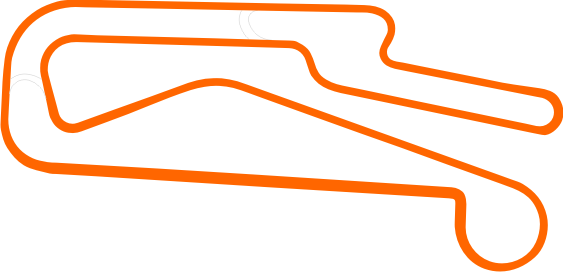
Layout A - 4.140 km (2.572 mi)

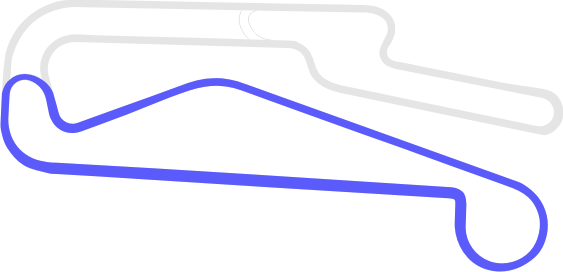
Layout B - 2.140 km (1.330 mi)

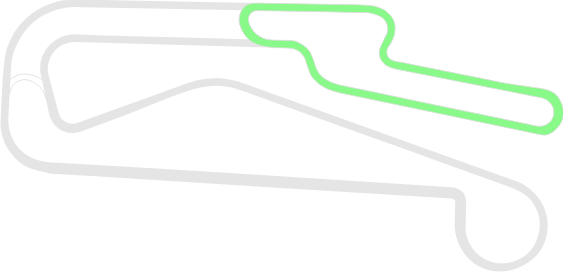
Layout C - 1.338 km (0.831 mi)

== Lap records ==
As of April 2017, the fastest official race lap records at the Rustavi International Motorpark are listed as:

Category	Time	Driver	Vehicle	Event
'A' Circuit (2012–present): 4.140 km (2.572 mi)
TCR Touring Car	1:42.657	(Spain) Pepe Oriola	SEAT León TCR	2017 Rustavi TCR International Series round
Formula Alfa	1:42.992	(Georgia (country)) Nika Adejshvili	AKKS Formula Alfa	2012 Rustavi International Challenge Formula Alfa race
